= Neofinetia =

Former genus of flowering plants

Neofinetia was a genus of flowering plants from the orchid family, Orchidaceae, that is now regarded as a synonym of Vanda. It contained three species and was distributed in China, Korea, and Japan.

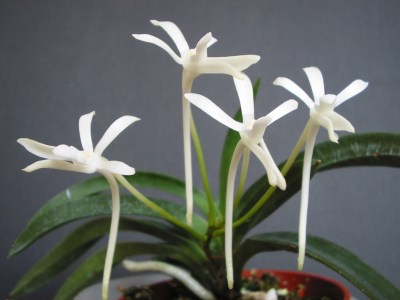
Vanda falcata, formerly Neofinetia falcata

== Taxonomy ==
The type species was introduced to the West from Japan by Carl Peter Thunberg in 1784, and placed in the genus Orchis. In 1925 H. H. Hu created Neofinetia as a monotypic genus. Neofinetia is named in honor of Achille Eugène Finet, a French botanist and author of Contributions a la Flore de L'Asie Orientale. The Greek prefix neo, (new) was added to distinguish it from another plant genus named earlier to honor Finet.

=== Species ===
- Neofinetia falcata (Thunberg) Hu = Vanda falcata

The type species of the former genus, it is known as 风兰 (feng lan) in China, where it is found in (N Fujian, S Gansu, SW Hubei, W Jiangxi, Sichuan, Zhejiang); 풍란 (pungnan) in Korea; and 風蘭 (fũran) in Japan, where it is found in (Honshu from the Kantō region westwards, Shikoku, Kyushu, and Ryukyu Islands.)

- Neofinetia richardsiana Christenson = Vanda richardsiana

Resembling V. falcata but with short nectar spurs, it is known as 短距风兰 (duan ju feng lan) in China, where it is found in (Chongqing).

- Neofinetia xichangensis Z.J.Liu & S.C.Chen = Vanda xichangensis

Known as 西昌风兰 (xi chang feng lan) in China, it is found in (SW Sichuan). (There is some controversy on whether V. xichangensis is a true species, or just a large form of V. richardsiana.)

== Intergeneric hybrids ==
In horticulture, Neofinetia was abbreviated as Neof. In the last part of the 20th century, it gained a great deal of attention in hybrid programs with other vandaceous orchids, thanks to its relative hardiness, scent, compact size, and above all, ease of culture. The names below are all obsolete, since Neofinetia is now synonymous with Vanda. For example, × Aeridofinetia is now × Aeridovanda.

- Neofinetia × Aerides = Aeridofinetia
- Neofinetia × Angraecum = Neograecum
- Neofinetia × Ascocentrum = Ascofinetia
- Neofinetia × Ascoglossum = Neoglossum
- Neofinetia × Cleisocentron = Cleisofinetia
- Neofinetia × Doritis = Dorifinetia
- Neofinetia × Luisia = Luinetia
- Neofinetia × Phalaenopsis = Phalanetia
- Neofinetia × Renanthera = Renanetia
- Neofinetia × Rhynchostylis = Neostylis (e.g. 'Lou Sneary')
- Neofinetia × Robiquetia = Robifinetia
- Neofinetia × Vanda = Vandofinetia
- Neofinetia × Aerides × Arachnis = Hanesara
- Neofinetia × Aerides × Ascocentrum = Aerasconetia
- Neofinetia × Aerides × Ascocentrum × Rhynchostylis = Moonara
- Neofinetia × Aerides × Ascocentrum × Vanda = Micholitzara
- Neofinetia × Aerides × Rhynchostylis × Vanda = Sanjumeara
- Neofinetia × Aerides × Vanda = Vandofinides
- Neofinetia × Ascocentrum × Cleisocentron = Ascocleinetia
- Neofinetia × Ascocentrum × Luisia = Luascotia
- Neofinetia × Ascocentrum × Luisia × Rhynchostylis = Dominyara
- Neofinetia × Ascocentrum × Renanthera = Rosakirschara
- Neofinetia × Ascocentrum × Renanthera × Rhynchostylis × Vanda = Knudsonara
- Neofinetia × Ascocentrum × Rhynchostylis = Rumrillara
- Neofinetia × Ascocentrum × Rhynchostylis × Vanda = Darwinara
- Neofinetia × Ascocentrum × Vanda = Nakamotoara
- Neofinetia × Ascocentrum × Vanda = Nakamotoara (e.g. 'Newberry Apricot')
- Neofinetia × Luisia × Vanda = Luivanetia
- Neofinetia × Renanthera × Rhynchostylis = Hueylihara
- Neofinetia × Renanthera × Vanda = Renafinanda
- Neofinetia × Rhynchostylis × Vanda = Yonezawaara (e.g. 'Blue Star')
