= List of Indian state flowers =

State flowers of India

India, officially the Republic of India is a country in South Asia, consisting of 28 states and eight union territories. All Indian states and some of the union territories have their own elected government and the union territories come under the jurisdiction of the Central Government. India has its own national symbols. Apart from the national symbols, the states and union territories have adopted their own seals and symbols including flowers listed below.

== States ==
List of Indian state flowers
State	Common name	Binomial name	Image
Andhra Pradesh	Jasmine	Jasminum officinale	
Arunachal Pradesh	Foxtail orchid	Rhynchostylis retusa	
Assam	Foxtail orchid	Rhynchostylis retusa	
Bihar	Kachnar	Bauhinia variegata	
Goa	Red jasmine	Plumeria rubra	
Gujarat	Marigold	Tagetes erecta	
Haryana	Lotus	Nelumbo nucifera	
Himachal Pradesh	Pink rhododendron	Rhododendron campanulatum	
Jharkhand	Palash	Butea monosperma	
Karnataka	Lotus	Nelumbo nucifera	
Kerala	Golden shower	Cassia fistula	
Madhya Pradesh	Palash	Butea monosperma	
Maharashtra	Jarul	Lagerstroemia speciosa	
Manipur	Siroi lily	Lilium mackliniae	
Meghalaya	Lady's slipper orchid	Paphiopedilum insigne	
Mizoram	Red vanda	Renanthera imschootiana	
Nagaland	Rhododendron	Rhododendron arboreum	
Odisha	Ashoka	Saraca asoca	
Punjab	Sword lily	Gladiolus grandiflorus	
Rajasthan	Rohira	Tecomella undulata	
Sikkim	Noble orchid	Cymbidium goeringii	
Tamil Nadu	Glory lily	Gloriosa superba	
Telangana	Tanner's cassia	Senna auriculata	
Tripura	Nageswar	Mesua ferrea	
Uttar Pradesh	Palash	Butea monosperma	
Uttarakhand	Brahma kamal	Saussurea obvallata	
West Bengal	Night flowering jasmine	Nyctanthes arbor-tristis	

== Union territories ==
List of Indian state flowers (Union territories)
Union territory	Common name	Binomial name	Image
Andaman and Nicobar Islands	Andaman Pyinma	Lagerstroemia hypoleuca	
Chandigarh	Palash	Butea monosperma	
Delhi	Alfalfa	Medicago sativa	
Jammu and Kashmir	Common rhododendron	Rhododendron ponticum	
Ladakh	Himalayan blue poppy	Meconopsis aculeata	
Lakshadweep	Neelakurinji	Strobilanthes kunthiana	
Puducherry	Cannonball flower	Couroupita guianensis	
