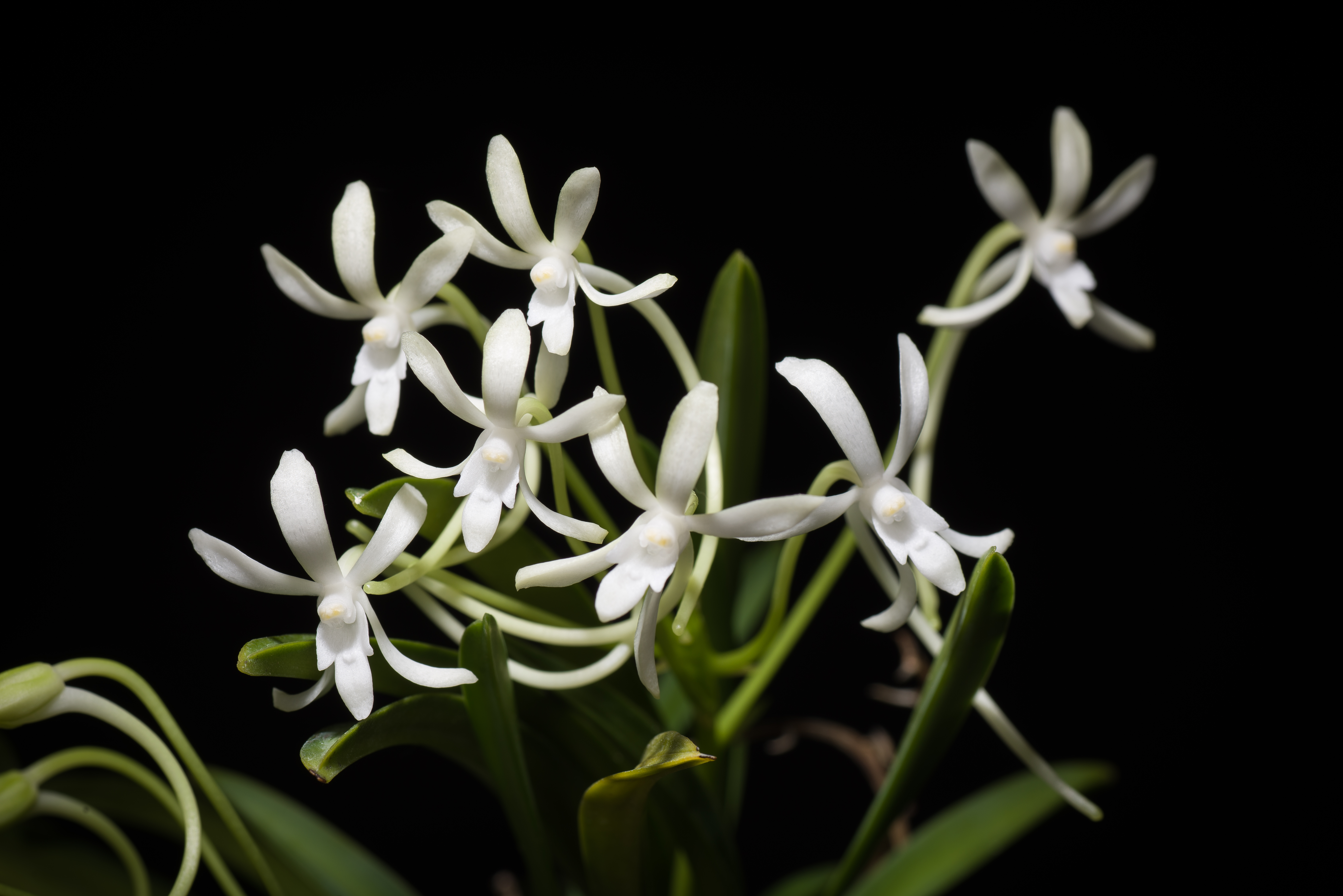
- Flowering Vanda falcata specimen in cultivation
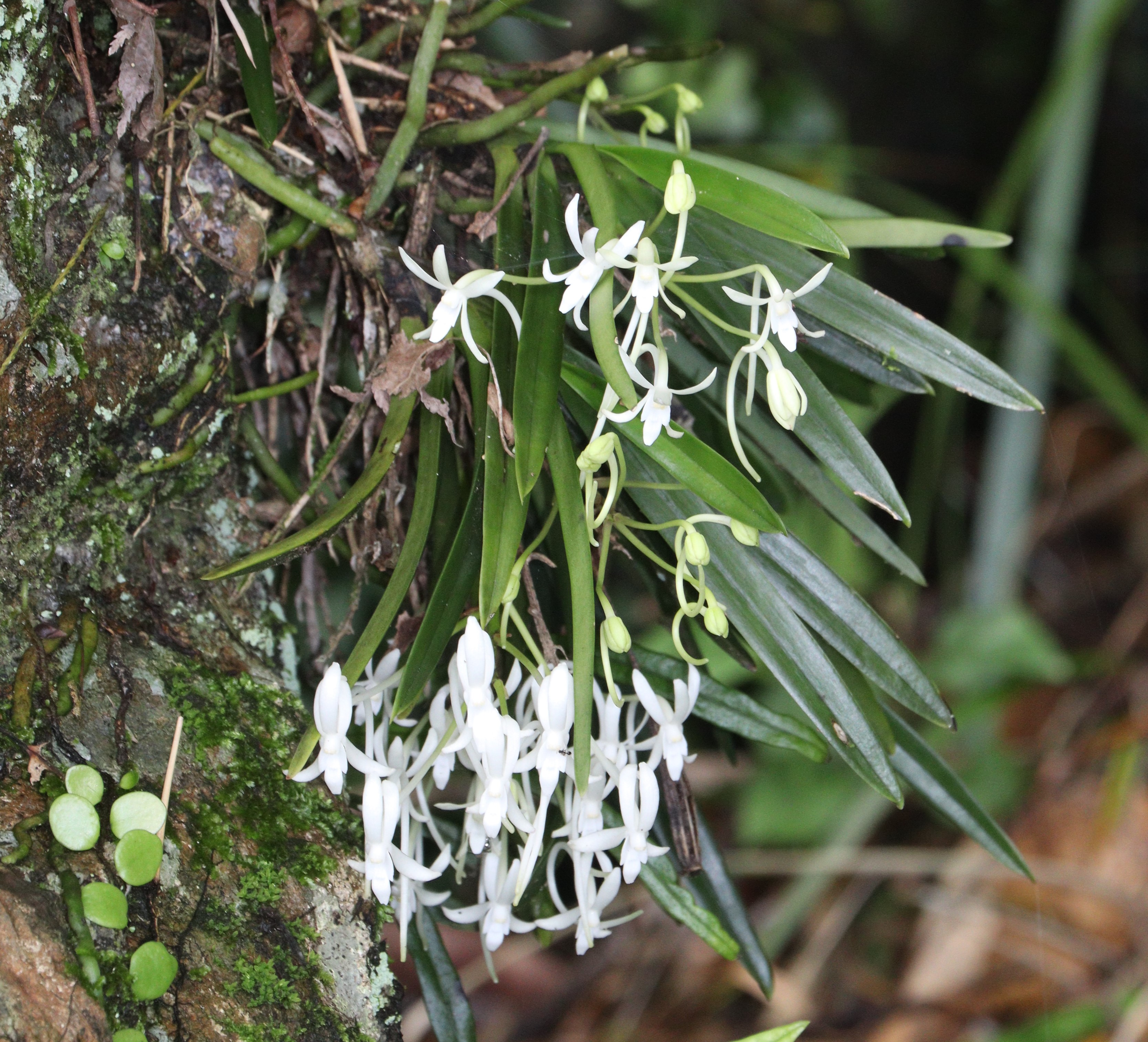
- Flowering Vanda falcata specimen with one mature capsule fruit

Conservation status
- Vulnerable (IUCN 3.1)

Scientific classification
- Kingdom: Plantae
- Clade: Embryophytes
- Clade: Tracheophytes
- Clade: Angiosperms
- Clade: Monocots
- Order: Asparagales
- Family: Orchidaceae
- Subfamily: Epidendroideae
- Genus: Vanda
- Species: V. falcata

Binomial name
- Vanda falcata (Thunb.) Beer

Subspecies
- Vanda falcata subsp. falcata; Vanda falcata subsp. richardsiana (Christenson) Motes; Vanda falcata subsp. xichangensis (Z.J.Liu & S.C.Chen) Motes

Synonyms
- Aerides thunbergii Miq.; Angorkis falcata (Thunb.) Kuntze; Angraecopsis falcata (Thunb.) Schltr.; Angraecum falcatum (Thunb.) Lindl.; Finetia falcata (Thunb.) Schltr.; Holcoglossum falcatum (Thunb.) Garay & H.R.Sweet; Limodorum falcatum (Thunb.) Thunb.; Neofinetia falcata (Thunb.) Hu; Nipponorchis falcata (Thunb.) Masam.; Oeceoclades falcata (Thunb.) Lindl.; Orchis falcata Thunb.; Vanda pygmaea H.Laurentius; Synonyms of Vanda falcata subsp. falcata: Oeceoclades lindleyi Regel

= Vanda falcata =

Vanda falcata Temporal range: 0.03 –0 Ma Late Pleistocene – Recent

Species of orchid

Vanda falcata, also known as 风兰 (feng lan) in Chinese, 풍란 (pungnan) in Korean, 風蘭 (fūran) in Japanese, or the wind orchid in English, is a species of orchid found in China, Korea, and Japan. It was formerly classified in the genus Neofinetia.

Named cultivars selected for characteristics including variegation, flower color or form, and vegetative form are often referred to as 富貴蘭 (fūkiran) in Japan. Due to these highly variable mutant forms this species has been proposed as a model organism for floral development in orchids.

== Description ==
Plants are 8–12 cm tall on monopodial stems of 1–6 cm. There are usually between 4 and 20 narrowly oblong-falcate (hence the epithet) leaves of 5–12 cm. that are leathery and sheathed at the base. The inflorescence, including flowers, is 5–8 cm. long, suberect, and carries as few as two, and as many as 10 fragrant, white flowers, each with a characteristic curved spur. 2n = 38.

== Ecology ==
Vanda falcata grows as an epiphyte on the branches and trunks of both deciduous and evergreen trees, and occasionally as a lithophyte on rock cliffs and man-made stone walls. Numerous whitish roots grow from the base of the plant, anchoring it to its host or substrate and collecting nutrients washed down from above. These roots are accustomed to excellent air movement. An adult in an optimal situation will produce numerous offsets.

Within V. falcata's range summer temperatures average 26–31 °C. during the day and 18–23 °C. at night. Average humidity is 80–85% in summer, and about 75% during the rest of the seasons. Plants receive heaviest rainfall during East Asian rainy season: June and July in southern Japan. Blooming time is usually synchronized with the monsoon, although plants may very occasionally bloom as late as December.

=== Pollination ===
Vanda falcata has been reported to be pollinated by several hawkmoth species of the genus Theretra, namely Theretra japonica and Theretra nessus.

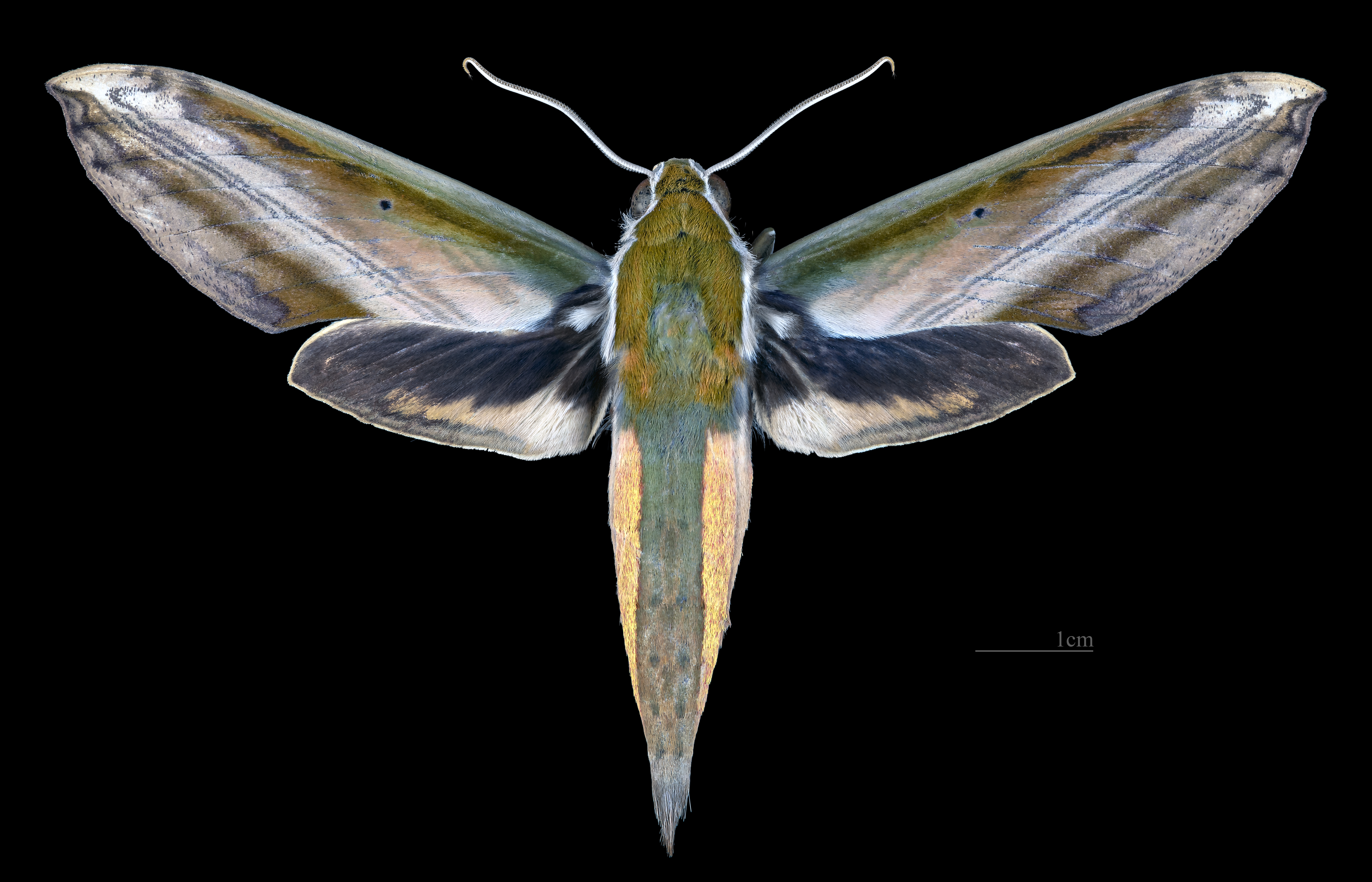
Theretra nessus, a likely pollinator of Vanda falcata

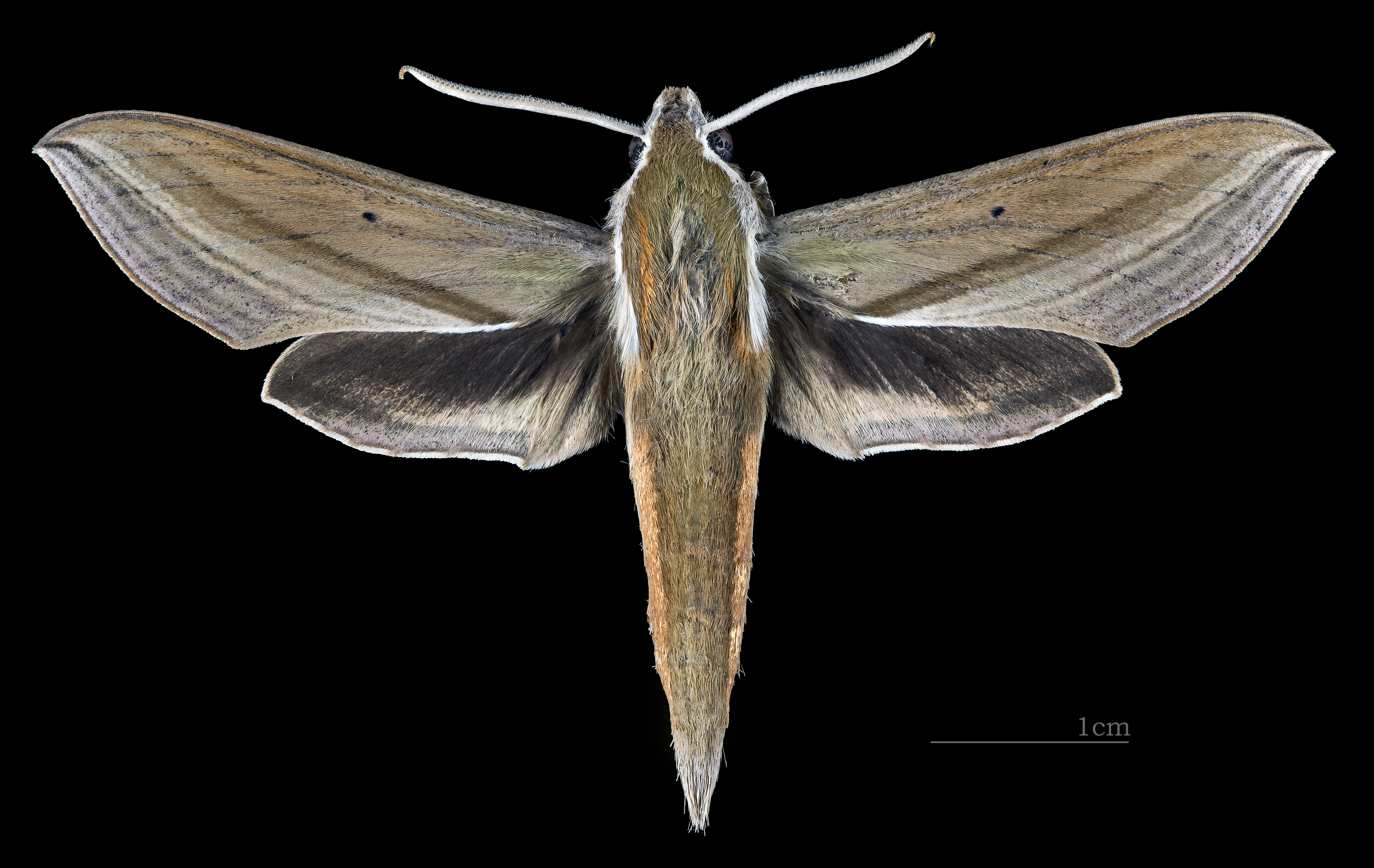
Theretra japonica, a likely pollinator of Vanda falcata

== Taxonomy ==
=== Taxonomic history ===
The type specimen was introduced to the West from Japan by Carl Peter Thunberg in 1784, and it was described as Orchis falcata. For the next hundred years and more, the species was renamed and moved in and out of many of the Asian sarcanthoid genera, in addition to the African genus Angraecum. Finally, in 1925 H. H. Hu created Neofinetia as a monotypic genus. Two other species were included in Neofinetia, before the genus was reduced to synonymy with Vanda.

== Horticulture ==
=== History of cultivation ===
Written records of V. falcata cultivation first appeared in Gao Lian’s The Anthography during the late Ming dynasty (1368 - 1644) China. In Japan, the first documented records of V. falcata appear during the Kanbun era (1661-1673), later reaching a peak in popularity during the middle of the Edo period with a marked increase in the number of cultivated varieties. At this time, because the numerous cultivated varieties of the species were primarily enjoyed by the daimyō and other wealthy or high ranked citizens, the cultivated varieties were given the designation of fūkiran (富貴蘭), translating to "orchid of wealth and rank".

=== Culture ===
Vanda falcata is a warm to cool grower. Plants may be mounted on slabs of cork or tree-fern fiber. In Japan, the custom is to grow them on a raised mound of sphagnum moss. The plants benefit from a cool, bright winter rest, and frequent watering when in growth.

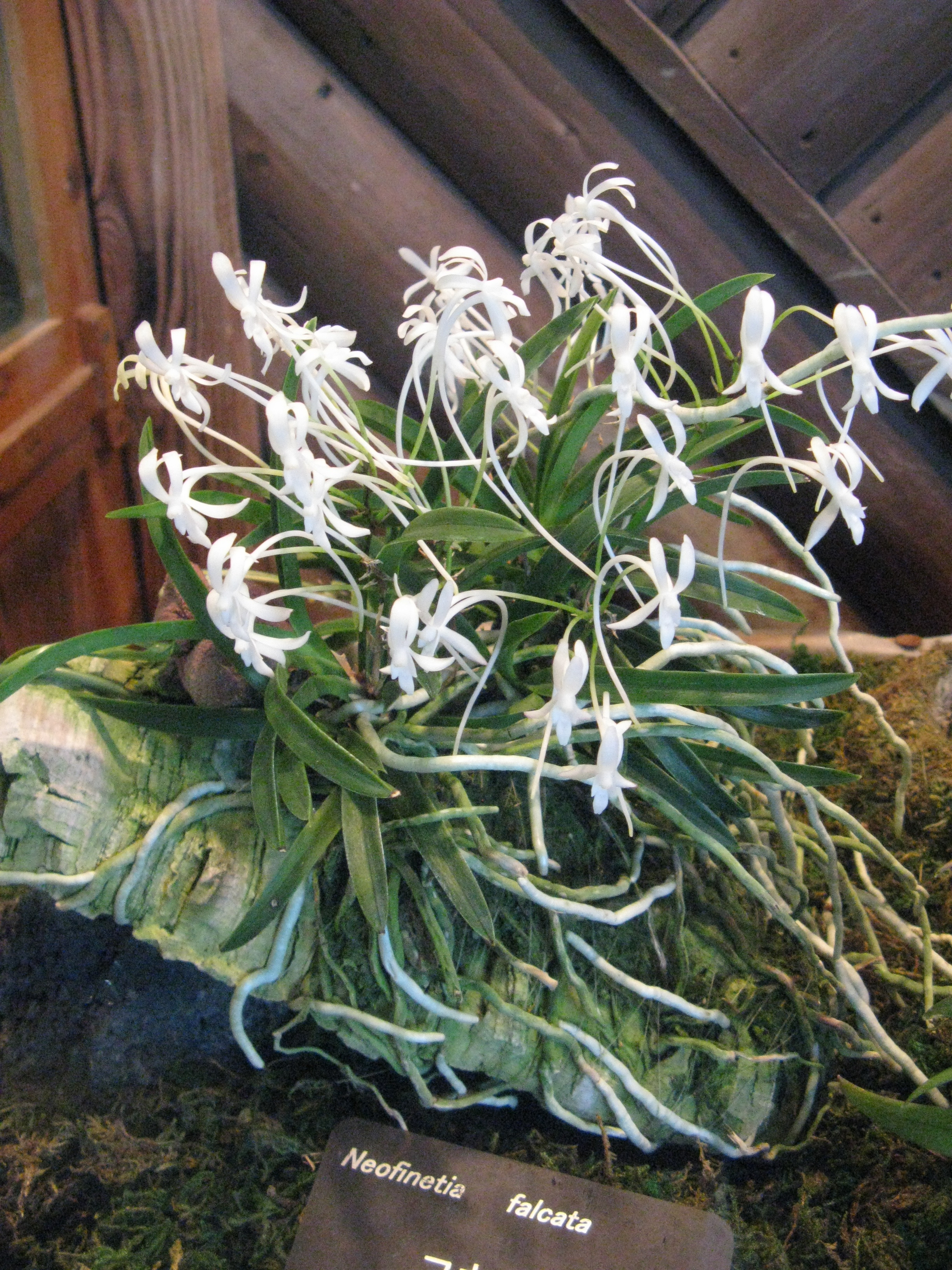
Vanda falcata cultivated in the Osaka Prefectural Flower Garden in Osaka, Japan

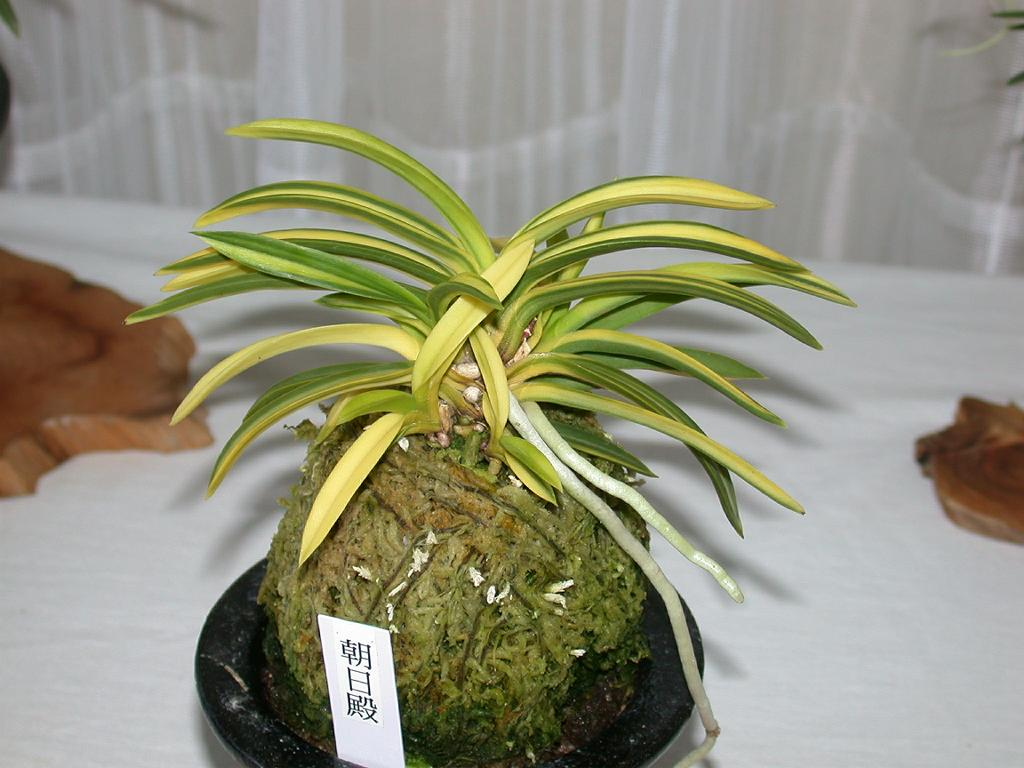
Vanda falcata cultivar known as 朝日殿 (Asahiden)

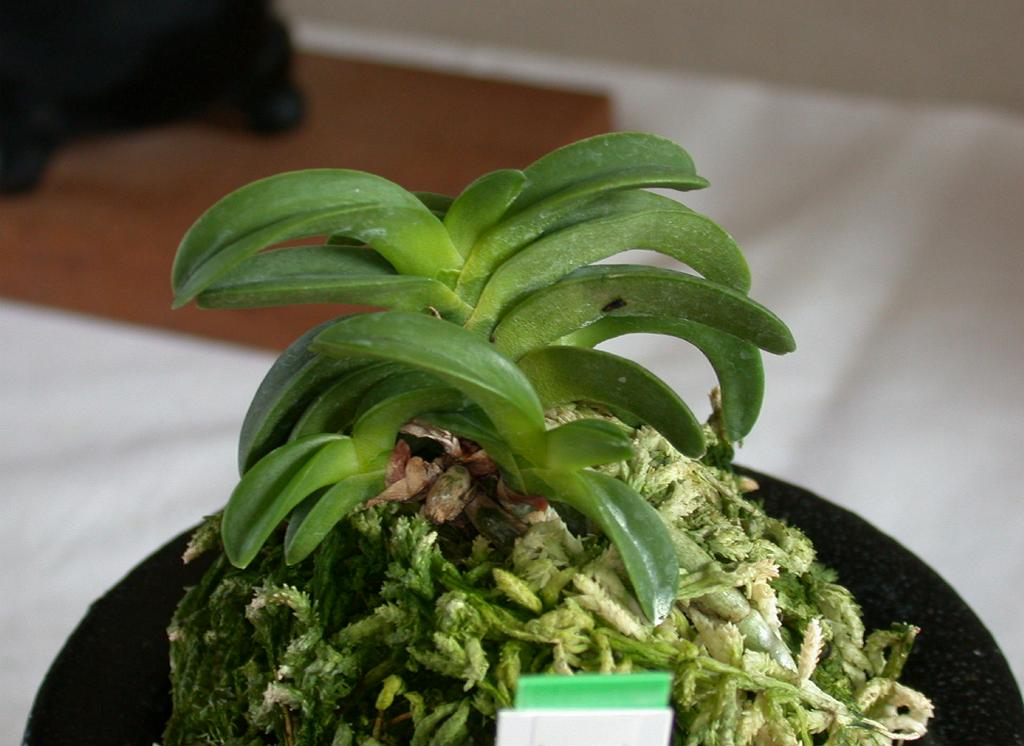
Vanda falcata cultivar known as 青海 (Seikai)

=== Hybrids ===
Most hybrid names are now obsolete, as several genera were reduced to synonymy with Vanda. (As listed by the RHS:)

- Aeridofinetia Hiroshima Choice — Aerides flabellata × Neof. falcata, M.Kobayashi 1995
- Aeridofinetia Pink Pearl — Aerides jarckiana × Neof. falcata, E.Iwanaga 1961
- Aeridofinetia Tiny Tim — Aerides falcata × Neof. falcata, W.K.Nakamoto 1966
- Aeridofinetia Suzuka Pearl — Neof. falcata × Aerides houlletiana, S.Katsuta 2007
- Ascofinetia A. F. Buckman — Neof. falcata × Ascocentrum christensonianum, A.Buckman 2008
- Ascofinetia Emly — Ascofinetia Peaches × Neof. falcata, E.Siegerist 1982
- Ascofinetia Color Burst — Neof. falcata × Ascocentrum Sidhi Gold, L.Soule(Kultana) 2006
- Ascofinetia Cherry Blossom — Neof. falcata × Ascocentrum ampullaceum, E.Iwanaga 1961
- Ascofinetia Furuse — Neof. falcata × Ascocentrum pumilum, H.Furuse 1979
- Ascofinetia Kaori — Neof. falcata × Ascofinetia Cherry Blossom, I.Mochizuki 1990
- Ascofinetia Lion Star — Neof. falcata × Ascocentrum Sagarik Gold, L.Stern 1984
- Ascofinetia Peaches — Neof. falcata × Ascocentrum curvifolium, E.Iwanaga 1962
- Ascofinetia Twinkle — Neof. falcata × Ascocentrum miniatum, Rev.M.Yamada 1960
- Ascofinetia Yellow Fuuran — Neof. falcata × Ascocentrum sp., O/U 2000
- Chrisnetia Green Light — Christensonia vietnamica × Neof. falcata, Ching Hua 2008
- Cleisofinetia Rumrill Cameo — Cleisocentron pallens × Neof. falcata, J.Rumrill 1987
- Darwinara Charm — Neof. falcata × Vascostylis Tham Yuen Hae, Takaki O.N. 1987
- Darwinara Fuchs Cream Puff — Neof. falcata × Vascostylis Five Friendships, R.F.Orchids 1995
- Darwinara Pretty Girl — Neof. falcata × Vascostylis Jim Snider, Takaki O.N. 1989
- Dorifinetia Little Cherry — Dorifinetia Pilialoha × Neof. falcata, Takaki O.N. 1989
- Dorifinetia Pilialoha — Doritis pulcherrima × Neof. falcata, Mr/Mrs H.Starke (Y.Sagawa) 1975
- Jisooara Jisco — Rhynchofadanda Porchina Blue × Neof. falcata, R.Perreira 1987
- Hanesara Golden Beauty — Neof. falcata × Aeridachnis Bogor, J.Hanes 1977
- Luinetia Rumrill — Neof. falcata × Luisia teres, J.Rumrill 1975
- Mizunoara Pololei Sunset — Neof. falcata × Kagawara Christie Low, Haiku Maui (N.Mizuno) 2005
- Nakamotoara Blanc — Ascocenda Charm × Neof. falcata, Rev.M.Yamada 1965
- Nakamotoara Cherry Hill — Neof. falcata × Ascocenda Aroonsri Beauty, M.Sato 1990
- Nakamotoara Dainty Delight — Ascocenda Ophelia × Neof. falcata, Rod McLellan Co. 1980
- Nakamotoara Joyce Hands — Neof. falcata × Ascocenda Blue Boy, G.Hands(O/U) 2007
- Nakamotoara Peach Mist — Neof. falcata × Ascocenda Karnda, Arnold J.Klehm 1997
- Nakamotoara Thai Surprise — Ascocenda Peggy Foo × Neof. falcata, R.Griesbach (Bangkok Fl.Centre) 1996
- Nakamotoara Rainbow Gem — Neof. falcata × Ascocenda Flambeau, Takaki O.N. 1989
- Nakamotoara Selsal's Baby Blue — Neof. falcata × Ascocenda Blue Eyes, J.& I.Sellés 1995
- Nakamotoara Wendy — Neof. falcata × Ascocenda Meda Arnold, W.K.Nakamoto 1964
- Neofadenia Ucho — Neof. falcata × Seidenfadenia mitrata, S.Ichijyo (K.Nakatani) 1984
- Neoglossum Rumrill Dilly — Neof. falcata × Ascoglossum calopterum, J.Rumrill 1989
- Neograecum Conny Röllke — Neof. falcata × Angraecum scottianum, Röllke Orchzt. (G.Röllke) 1990
- Neosedanda (Vandofinides) Purity — Vandirea Takagi × Neof. falcata, J.Rumrill 1980
- Neosedirea Summer Stars — Neof. falcata × Sedirea japonica, H.Furuse 1979
- Neostylis Baby Angel — Neof. falcata × Neostylis Lou Sneary, Takaki O.N. 1989
- Neostylis Dainty — Neof. falcata × Rhynchostylis retusa, Elliott Flynn 1965
- Neostylis Lou Sneary — Neof. falcata × Rhynchostylis coelestis, Hajime Ono 1970
- Neostylis Pinky — Neof. falcata × Rhynchostylis gigantea, M.Kobayashi 1990
- Parafinetia Crownfox Twinkle — Paraphalaenopsis serpentilingua × Neof. falcata, R.F. Orchids (Cheah Wah Sang) 2009
- Phalanetia Anna Bettencourt — Neof. falcata × Phalaenopsis Veitchiana, Bettencourt 1988
- Phalanetia Hoshizukiyo — Phalanetia Irene × Neof. falcata, T.Morie 2002
- Phalanetia Irene — Neof. falcata × Phalaenopsis equestris, Y.Sagawa 1975
- Phalanetia Koibotaru — Neof. falcata × Phalaenopsis schilleriana, T.Morie 2000
- Phalanetia Pacifica — Neof. falcata × Phalaenopsis Chieftain, W.K.Nakamoto 1964
- Renanetia Bali — Renanthera Brookie Chandler × Neof. falcata, E.Iwanaga 1962
- Renanetia Sunrise — Neof. falcata × Renanthera imschootiana, Sak.Takagi 1967
- Robifinetia Rumrill Vanguard — Robiquetia spathulata × Neof. falcata, J.Rumrill 1982
- Rumrillara Salome — Rumrillara Rosyleen × Neof. falcata, J.Rumrill 1979
- Sanjumeara Luke Neo — Neof. falcata × Perreiraara Luke Thai, T.Orchids (R.Viraphandhu) 1994
- Vandofinetia Aspenwood Elf — Neof. falcata × Vanda Ben Berliner, I.Cohen (Lauralin) 1985
- Vandofinetia Baby Star — Neof. falcata × Vandofinetia Pat Arcari, Takaki O.N. 1989
- Vandofinetia Blaupunkt — Vanda coerulescens × Neof. falcata, J.Lindstrom (J.Dunkelberger) 1986
- Vandofinetia Kelly's Cloud Catcher — Neof. falcata × Vanda Sally Roth, K.Hurley (Fournier) 2009
- Vandofinetia Little Blossom — Neof. falcata × Vanda Miss Joaquim, Sak.Takagi 1967
- Vandofinetia Nago Blue — Neof. falcata × Vanda Trevor Rathbone, E.Tamaki 1996
- Vandofinetia Nara — Vanda Patou × Neof. falcata, Kirin Brew. (K.Takagi) 1992
- Vandofinetia Oriental Beauty — Neof. falcata × Vanda Rothschildiana, Takaki O.N. 1987
- Vandofinetia Oriental Star — Neof. falcata × Vanda Little Blue, Takaki O.N. 1989
- Vandofinetia Pat Arcari — Vanda coerulea × Neof. falcata, Hajime Ono 1970
- Vandofinetia Premier — Neof. falcata × Vanda lamellata, Rev.M.Yamada 1960
- Vandofinetia Red Tide — Neof. falcata × Vanda Mystic Queen, Lauralin 1989
- Vandofinetia Snow Dance — Vanda Pissamai × Neof. falcata, Suphachadiwong (Kultana) 1984
- Vandofinetia Sweet Petite — Vanda Mimi Palmer × Neof. falcata, B.Thoms 1994
- Vandofinetia Venus — Vandofinetia Premier × Neof. falcata, J.Rumrill 1984
- Vandofinetia Virgil — Neof. falcata × Vanda cristata, Highland Trop. 1992
- Vandofinetia White Crane — Vanda sanderiana × Neof. falcata, Exotic Orchids 2006
- Wilkara Didit Finally — Asconopsis Irene Dobkin × Neof. falcata, C.Wilk 2003
