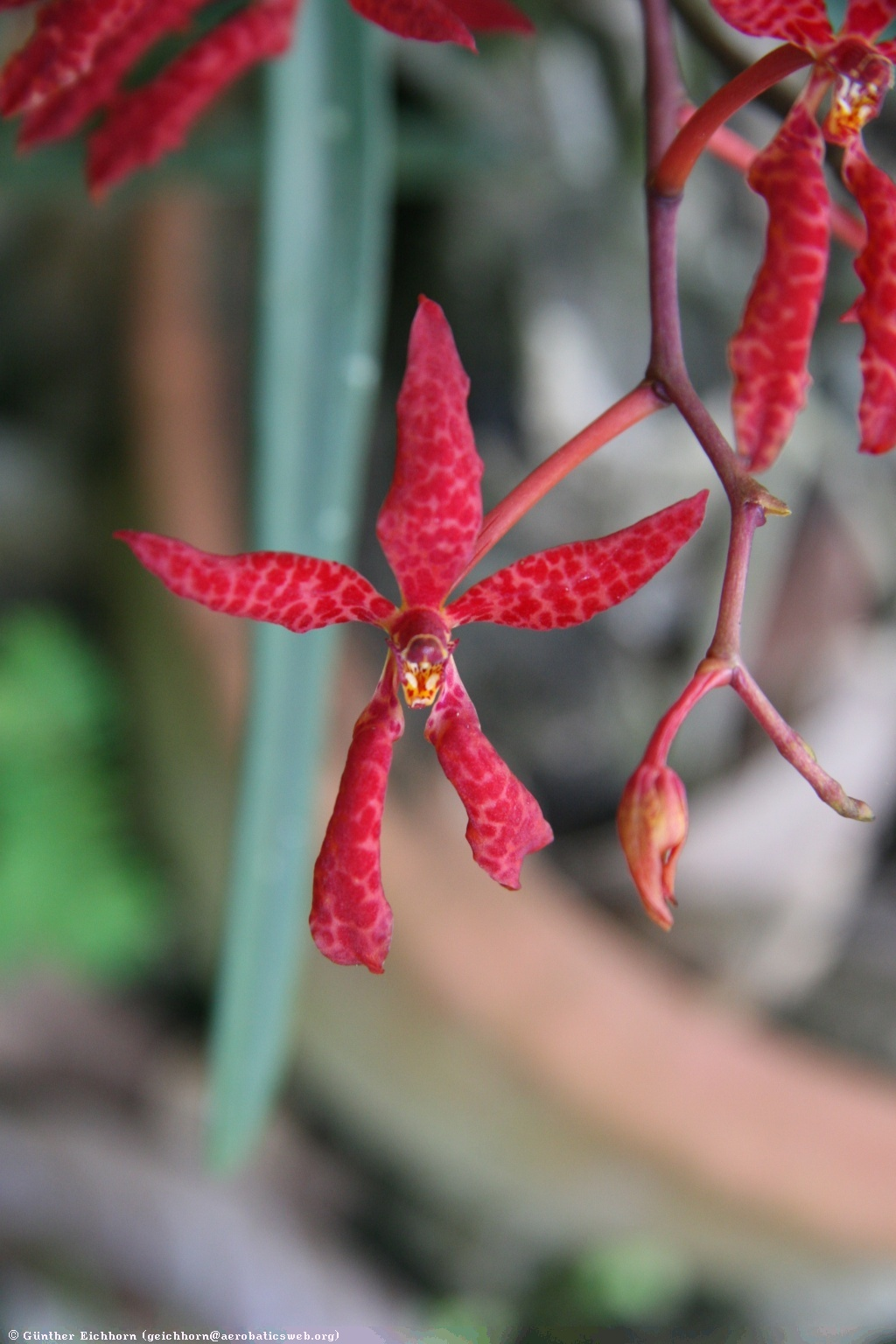
- Renanthera bella Orchid

Scientific classification
- Kingdom: Plantae
- Clade: Embryophytes
- Clade: Tracheophytes
- Clade: Angiosperms
- Clade: Monocots
- Order: Asparagales
- Family: Orchidaceae
- Subfamily: Epidendroideae
- Genus: Renanthera
- Species: R. bella

Binomial name
- Renanthera bella J.J.Wood

= Renanthera bella =

Species of orchid

Renanthera bella is a species of orchid. This orchid is only known from Mount Kinabalu in Malaysian Borneo.
