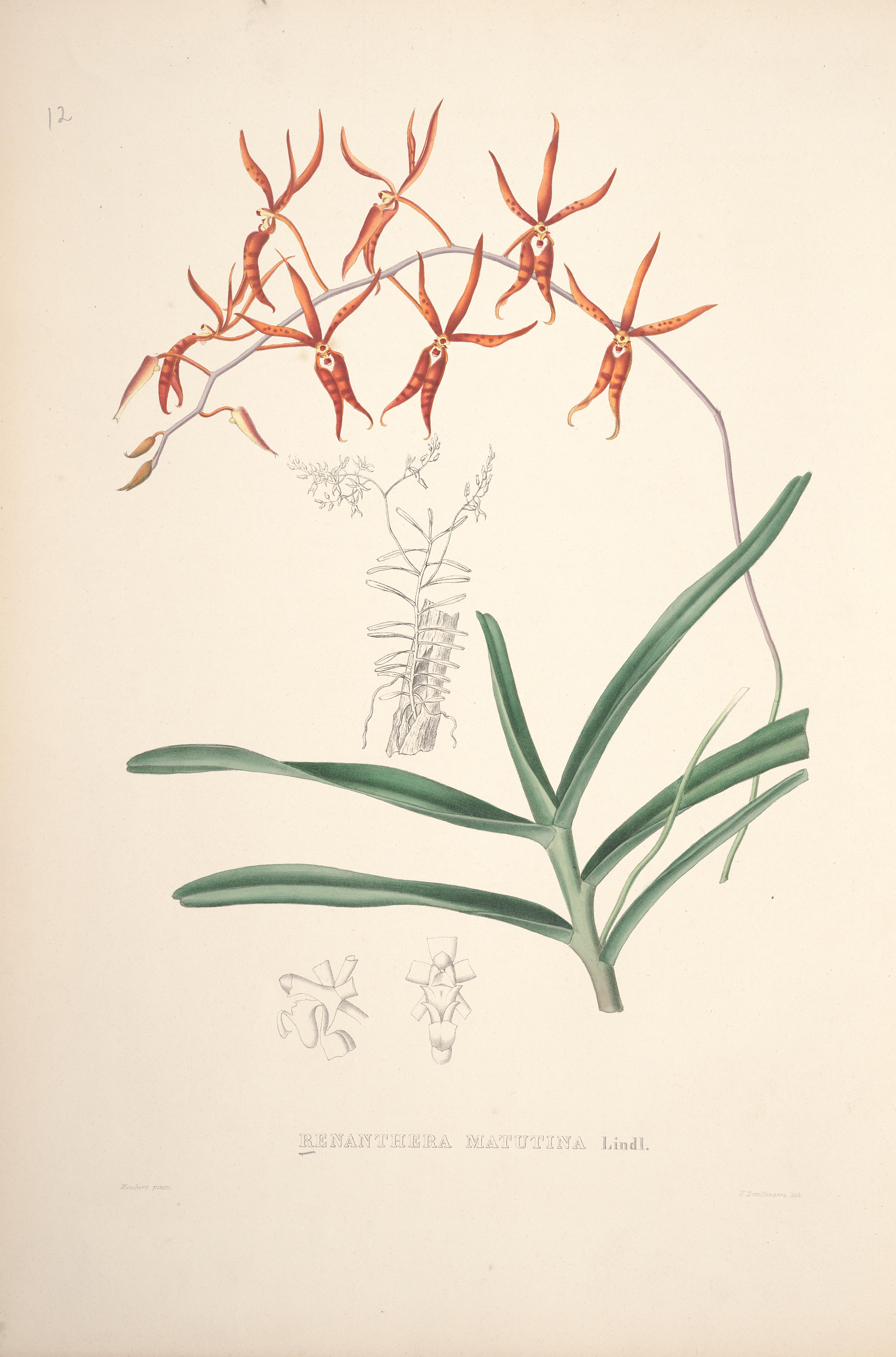
- Flower of Renanthera matutina

Scientific classification
- Kingdom: Plantae
- Clade: Embryophytes
- Clade: Tracheophytes
- Clade: Angiosperms
- Clade: Monocots
- Order: Asparagales
- Family: Orchidaceae
- Subfamily: Epidendroideae
- Genus: Renanthera
- Species: R. matutina

Binomial name
- Renanthera matutina (Poir.) Lindl.

Synonyms
- Aerides matutina Blume nom. illeg.(basionym); Nephranthera matutina (Poir.) Hassk.; Renanthera angustifolia Hook.f.

= Renanthera matutina =

Species of orchid

Renanthera matutina, common name early blooming renanthera, is a species of epiphytic orchid in the genus Renanthera of the family Orchidaceae.

== Description ==
Renanthera matutina is a monopodial epiphytic orchid that produces a long branched pendulous stem about 60–80 centimetres (24–31 in) long, bearing the inflorescence. The numerous flowers are pinkish-yellow, with red spots.

== Distribution ==
It occurs from western Indonesia (Thailand, Borneo, Sumatra, Java to Malaysia).

== Habitat ==
It grows in mountain forests and plains, at elevations between 100 metres (330 ft) and 700 metres (2,300 ft) above sea level. This plant requires a warm or intermediate temperature, in full light or partial shade. It grows well in a hanging basket.
