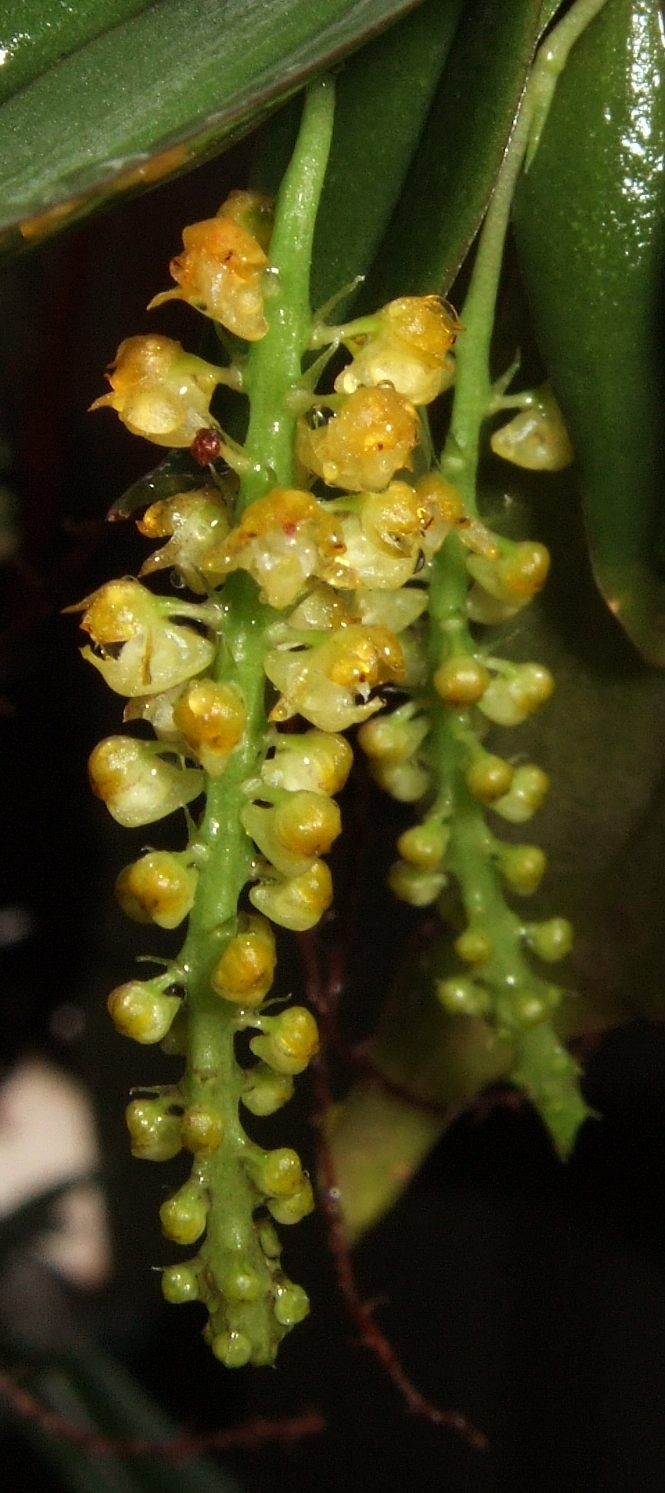

Scientific classification
- Kingdom: Plantae
- Clade: Tracheophytes
- Clade: Angiosperms
- Clade: Monocots
- Order: Asparagales
- Family: Orchidaceae
- Subfamily: Epidendroideae
- Genus: Robiquetia
- Species: R. minimiflora

Binomial name
- Robiquetia minimiflora (Hook.f.) J.J.Sm. (1917)

= Robiquetia minimiflora =

Tiny-flowered abdominea

Species of orchid

Robiquetia minimiflora, or the tiny-flowered abdominea, is a very rare monopodial epiphytic orchid species. It was previously known as the Abdominea minimiflora. It is distributed from Thailand to the Malay Peninsula, Java, and the Philippines.

The name is derived from the Latin abdomen, meaning belly. It refers to the similarity between the shape of the labellum (lip) and the shape of the abdomen of an insect.

The species produces very small flowers, about 0.45 cm wide, on a racemose, many-flowered inflorescence.
