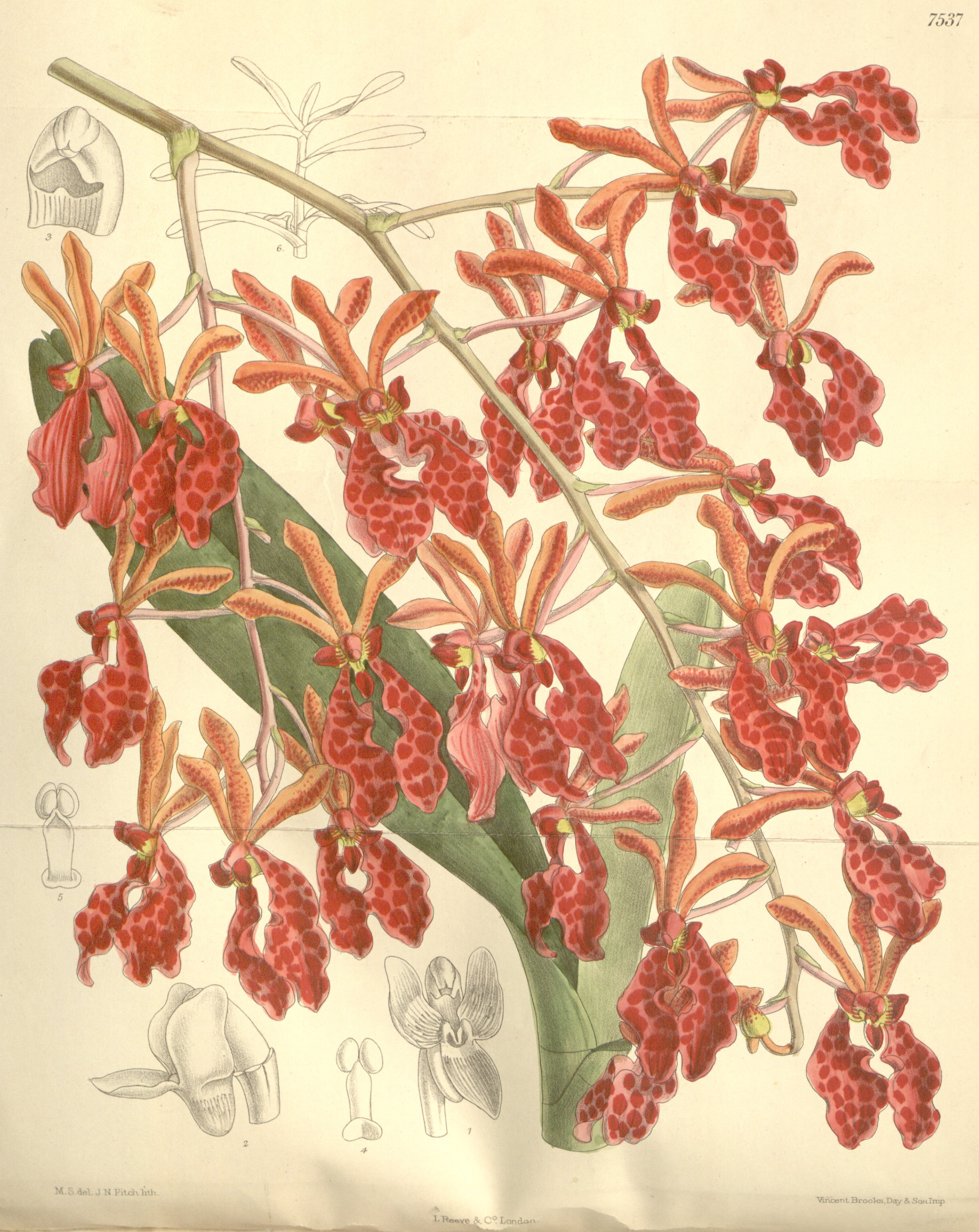
- Flower of Renanthera storiei

Scientific classification
- Kingdom: Plantae
- Clade: Embryophytes
- Clade: Tracheophytes
- Clade: Angiosperms
- Clade: Monocots
- Order: Asparagales
- Family: Orchidaceae
- Subfamily: Epidendroideae
- Genus: Renanthera
- Species: R. storiei

Binomial name
- Renanthera storiei Rchb.f.

Synonyms
- Vanda storiei Storie ex Rchb.f.; Renanthera storiei f. citrina Valmayor & D.Tiu

= Renanthera storiei =

Species of orchid

Renanthera storiei is a species of orchid endemic to the Philippines.
