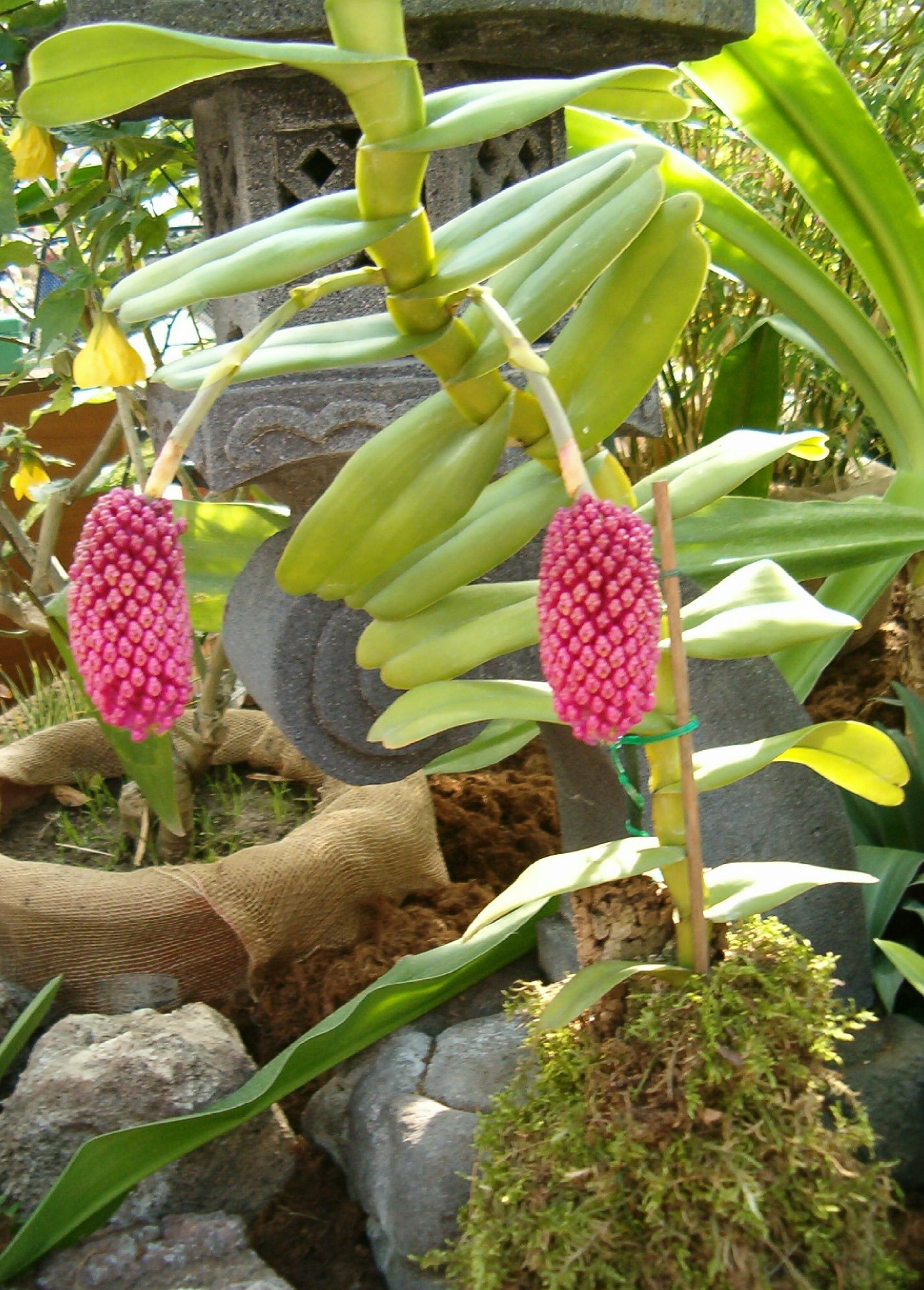
- Flowers of Robiquetia cerina

Scientific classification
- Kingdom: Plantae
- Clade: Tracheophytes
- Clade: Angiosperms
- Clade: Monocots
- Order: Asparagales
- Family: Orchidaceae
- Subfamily: Epidendroideae
- Genus: Robiquetia
- Species: R. cerina

Binomial name
- Robiquetia cerina (Rchb.f.) Garay

Synonyms
- Saccolabium cerinum Rchb.f. (basionym); Malleola merrillii Ames; Robiquetia merrillii (Ames) Ames

= Robiquetia cerina =

Species of orchid

Robiquetia cerina is a species of Orchid endemic to the Philippines. It is a epiphytic subshrub that typically grows in the wet tropical biome.
