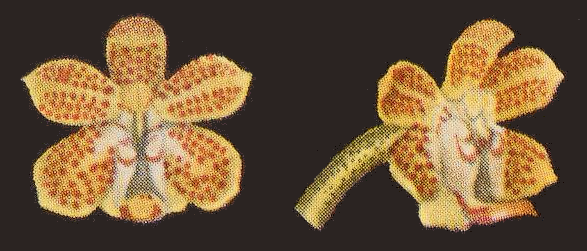
- Color plate illustration of R. pantherina's flowers

Scientific classification
- Kingdom: Plantae
- Clade: Tracheophytes
- Clade: Angiosperms
- Clade: Monocots
- Order: Asparagales
- Family: Orchidaceae
- Subfamily: Epidendroideae
- Genus: Robiquetia
- Species: R. pantherina

Binomial name
- Robiquetia pantherina (Kraenzl.) Ames

Synonyms
- Saccolabium pantherinum Kraenzl. (basionym)

= Robiquetia pantherina =

Species of orchid

Robiquetia pantherina is a species of Pouched Orchid endemic to the Philippines. The species was first collected by Chester A. Wenzel on July 15, 1913 in forested habitat at elevations of 60m or more.

== Description ==
Robiquetia pantherina is a epiphytic subshrub. The flowers are amber yellow with spots of a darker brown-purple, and is differentiated from other species by these markings as well as by its labellum.
