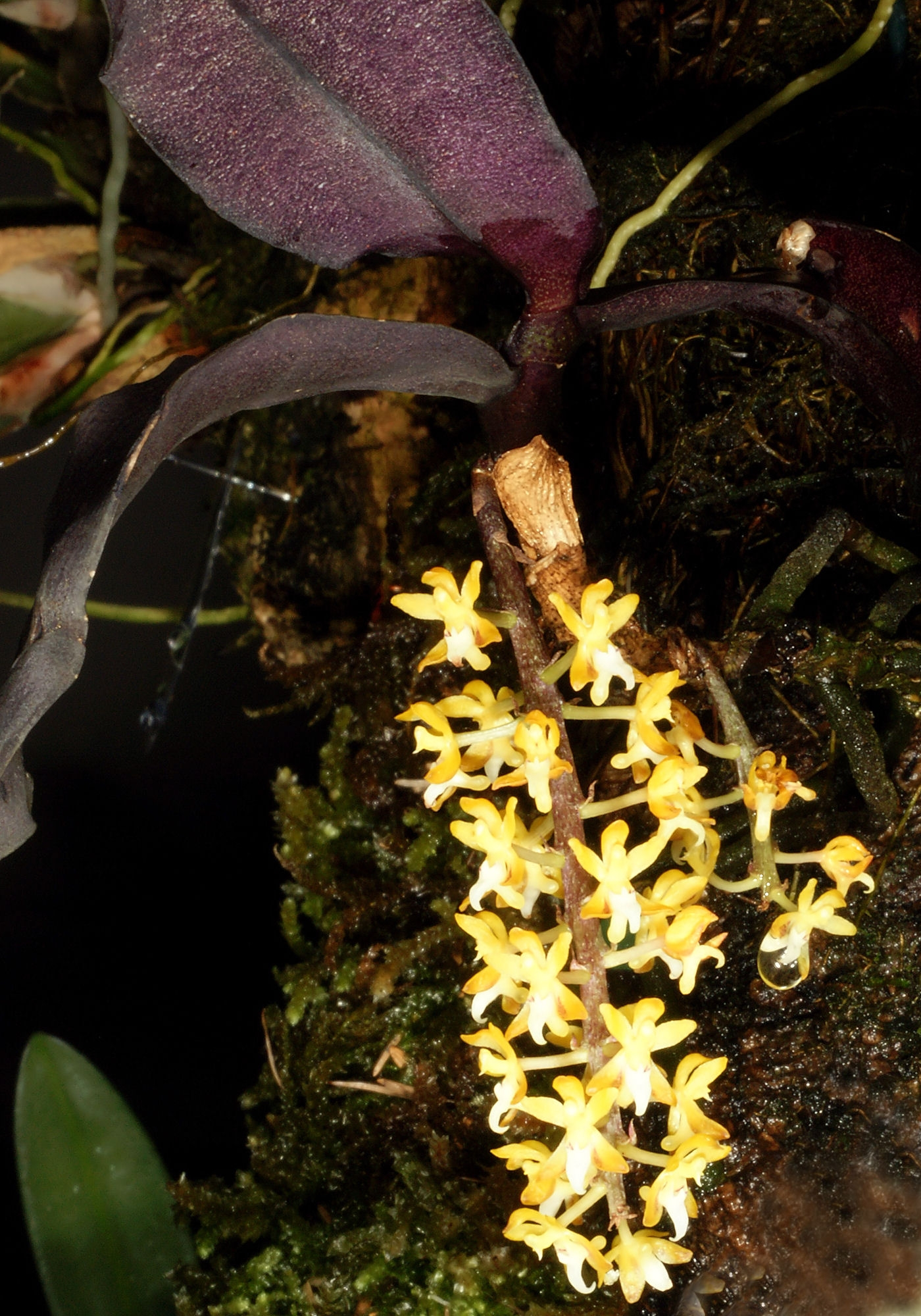

Scientific classification
- Kingdom: Plantae
- Clade: Tracheophytes
- Clade: Angiosperms
- Clade: Monocots
- Order: Asparagales
- Family: Orchidaceae
- Subfamily: Epidendroideae
- Genus: Robiquetia
- Species: R. aberrans

Binomial name
- Robiquetia aberrans (Schltr.) Kocyan & Schuit.

= Robiquetia aberrans =

Species of orchid

Robiquetia aberrans is a species of pouched orchid. It is found from Thailand to Malesia.

== Distribution and habitat ==
It is native to Borneo, Java, Lesser Sunda Islands, Philippines, Sulawesi, Thailand and parts of Malaysia. Under natural conditions, it is found on trees from sea level up to about 1250 meters.

== Description ==
Robiquetia aberrans is an epiphytic subshrub.
