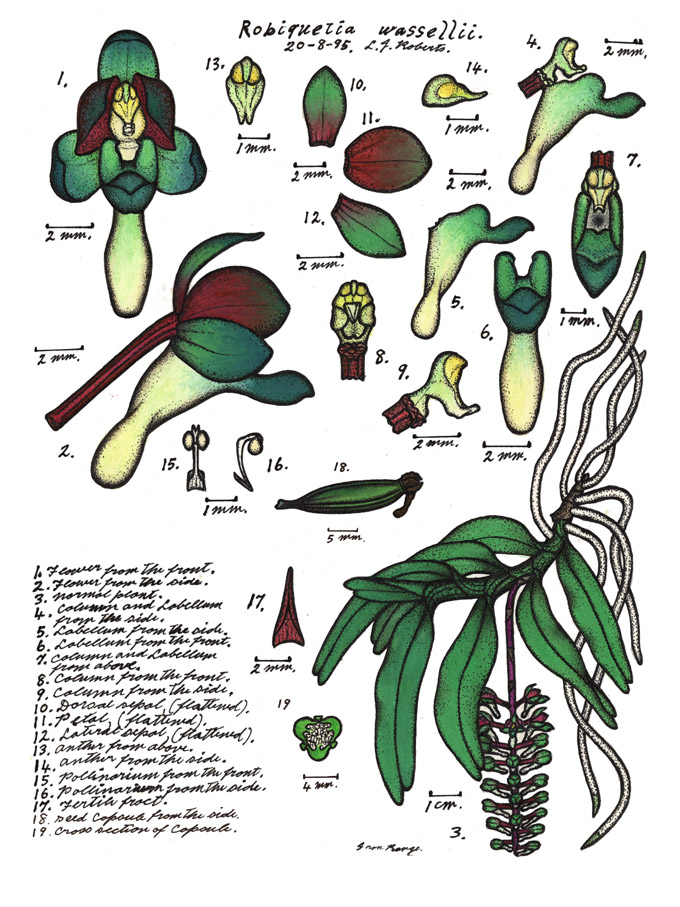
- Illustration by Lewis Roberts

Scientific classification
- Kingdom: Plantae
- Clade: Tracheophytes
- Clade: Angiosperms
- Clade: Monocots
- Order: Asparagales
- Family: Orchidaceae
- Subfamily: Epidendroideae
- Genus: Robiquetia
- Species: R. wassellii

Binomial name
- Robiquetia wassellii Dockrill

= Robiquetia wassellii =

Species of orchid

Robiquetia wassellii, commonly known as green pouched orchid, is an epiphytic or lithophytic orchid from the family Orchidaceae. It has thick roots, a pendulous stem, between three and six crowded, dark green leaves and many crowded dark green flowers with pink to red centres and a white to yellowish labellum. It grows on trees and rocks in rainforest in tropical North Queensland, Australia.

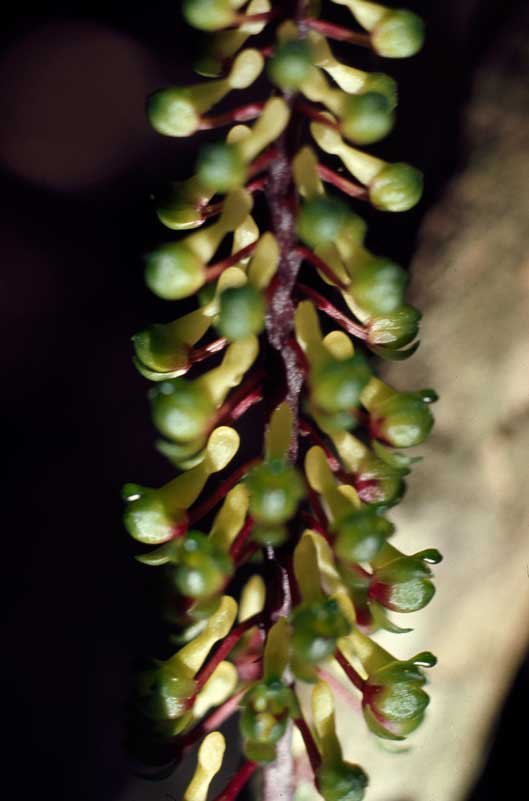
Flowers of Robiquetia wassellii

== Description ==
Robiquetia wassellii is an epiphytic or lithophytic herb that forms sparse clumps. It has thick roots and a pendulous stem, 100–500 millimetres (3.9–20 in) long. There are between three and six dark green leaves 80–140 millimetres (3.1–5.5 in) long and about 30 millimetres (1.2 in) wide. A large number of resupinate, cup-shaped, dark green flowers with a pink to red centre, 12–14 millimetres (0.47–0.55 in) long, 4–6 mm (0.16–0.24 in) are crowded on a pendulous flowering stem 100–150 mm (3.9–5.9 in) long. The sepals are blunt, narrow egg-shaped, 5–6 mm (0.20–0.24 in) long and 3–3.5 mm (0.12–0.14 in) wide, the dorsal sepal slightly longer and narrower than the lateral sepals. The petals are about 5.5 mm (0.22 in) long and 3.5 mm (0.14 in) wide. The labellum is white to yellowish, about 5.5 mm (0.22 in) long and 3.5 mm (0.14 in) wide and is basin-like with a beak-like tip and a spur about 12 mm (0.47 in). Flowering occurs from June to August.

== Taxonomy and naming ==
Robiquetia wassellii was first formally described in 1967 by Alick Dockrill who published the description in Australasian Sarcahthinae from a specimen collected in the McIlwraith Range by Joseph Leathom Hole Wassell. The specific epithet (wassellii) honours the collector of the type specimen.

== Distribution and habitat ==
Green pouched orchid grows on trees and boulders in humid rainforest in the Iron and McIlwraith Ranges.
