= Robiquetia bifida =

Scientific classification
- Kingdom: Plantae
- Clade: Tracheophytes
- Clade: Angiosperms
- Clade: Monocots
- Order: Asparagales
- Family: Orchidaceae
- Subfamily: Epidendroideae
- Genus: Robiquetia
- Species: R. bifida

Binomial name
- Robiquetia bifida (Lindl.) Kocyan & Schuit.

Synonyms
- Gastrochilus bifidus (Lindl.) Kuntze; Megalotus bifidus (Lindl.) Garay; Saccolabium bifidum Lindl.; Sarcanthus bifidus (Lindl.) Ames

Species of plant

Robiquetia bifida, synonyms including Megalotus bifidus, is a species of flowering plant in the family Orchidaceae, native to the Philippines. It was first described in 1838 as Saccolabium bifidum.
