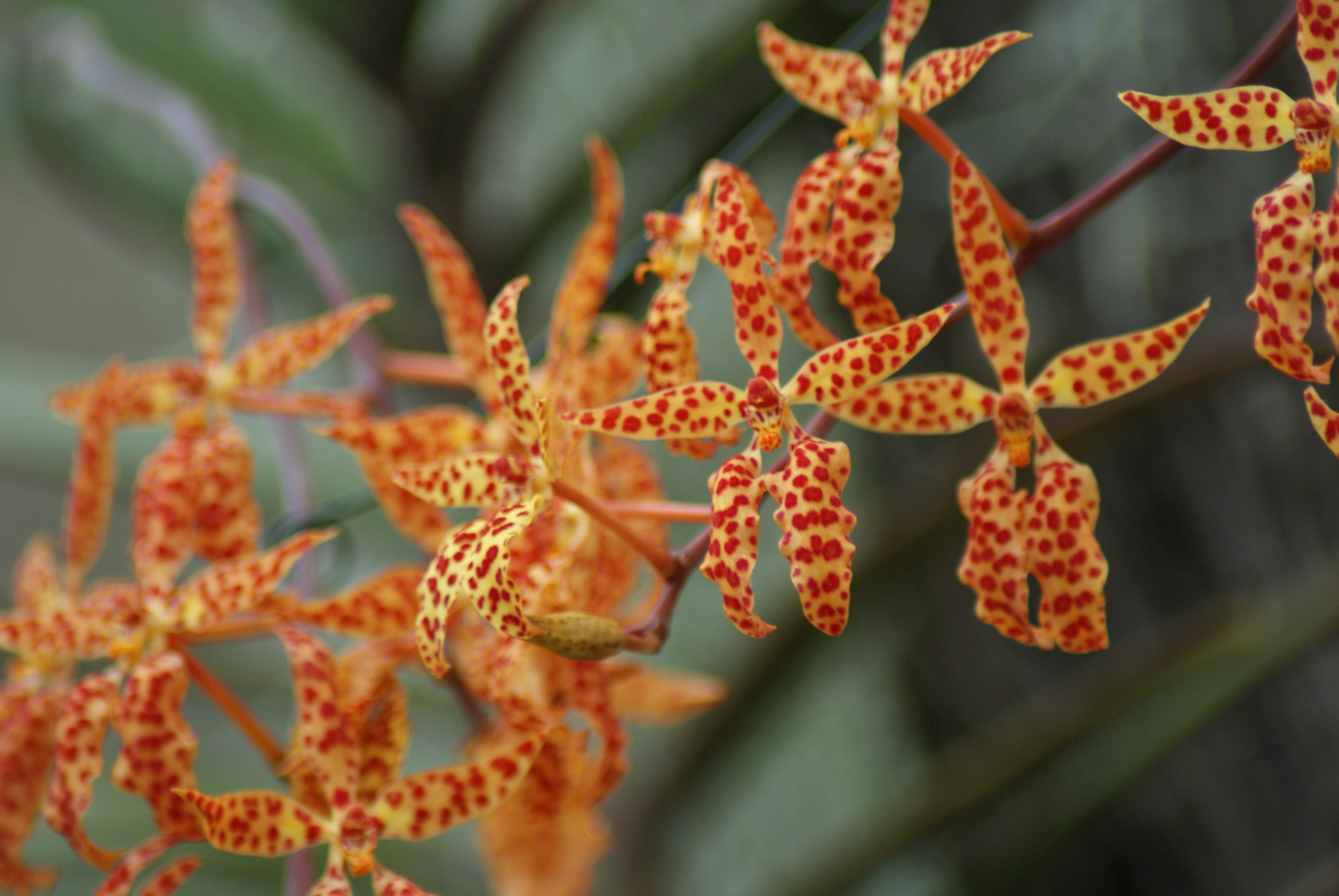

Scientific classification
- Kingdom: Plantae
- Clade: Tracheophytes
- Clade: Angiosperms
- Clade: Monocots
- Order: Asparagales
- Family: Orchidaceae
- Subfamily: Epidendroideae
- Genus: Renanthera
- Species: R. monachica

Binomial name
- Renanthera monachica Ames

= Renanthera monachica =

Species of orchid

Renanthera monachica is a species of orchid endemic to the Philippines. It has a yellow base and red spots.
