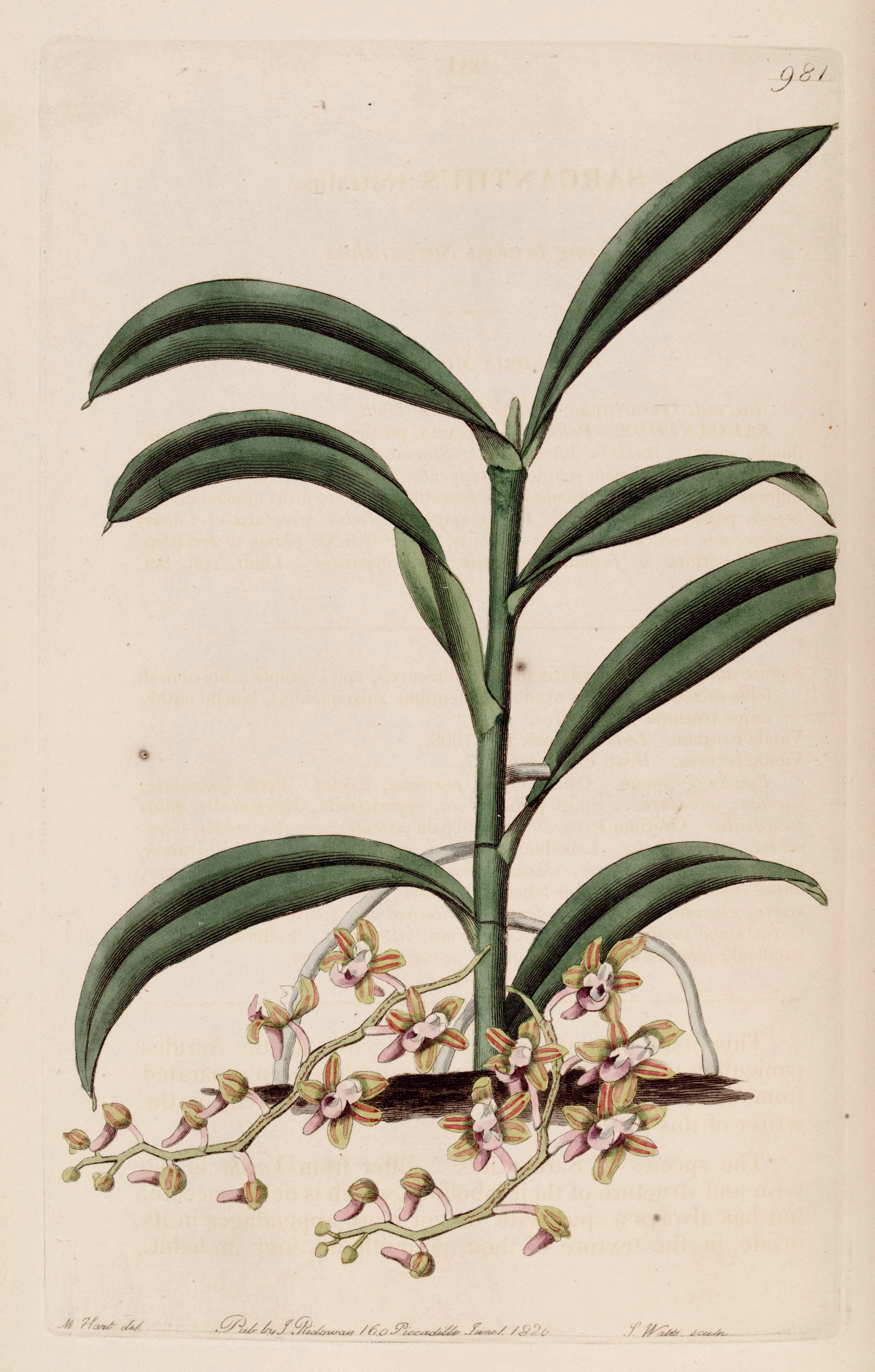
- 1826 illustration

Scientific classification
- Kingdom: Plantae
- Clade: Tracheophytes
- Clade: Angiosperms
- Clade: Monocots
- Order: Asparagales
- Family: Orchidaceae
- Subfamily: Epidendroideae
- Genus: Robiquetia
- Species: R. succisa

Binomial name
- Robiquetia succisa (Lindl.) Seidenf. & Garay

Synonyms
- Sarcanthus succisus Lindl. (basionym); Cymbidium satyrium Buch.-Ham. ex Wall.; Oeceoclades paniculata Lindl.; Saccolabium parvulum Lindl.; Saccolabium buccosum Rchb.f.; Cleisostoma virginale Hance; Gastrochilus parvulus Kuntze; Pomatocalpa virginale (Hance) J.J.Sm.; Robiquetia paniculata (Lindl.) J.J.Sm.; Sarcanthus henryi Schltr.; Uncifera buccosa (Rchb.f.) Finet ex Guillaumin

= Robiquetia succisa =

Species of orchid

Robiquetia succisa, commonly known as The Abruptly Broken Off Robiquetia, is a small to medium-sized species of pouched orchid found from eastern Nepal to southern China and Indochina.

== Distribution and habitat ==
Robiquetia succisa is native to Assam, Bangladesh, Cambodia, China (South-Central and South-East), east Himalaya, Hainan, Laos, Myanmar, Nepal, Thailand, and Vietnam.

Under natural conditions, it is found in open forests on the side of tree trunks, and on cliffs at elevations of 500–1200 meters above sea level.

== Description ==
It is a small to medium-sized epiphyte. The leaves are oblong, 6–12 cm long and 1.5-2.5 cm wide. The flowers are 7–9 mm in diameter, the sepals and the petals are pale yellow or yellowish green. The lip is whitish, the spur is yellowish green.
