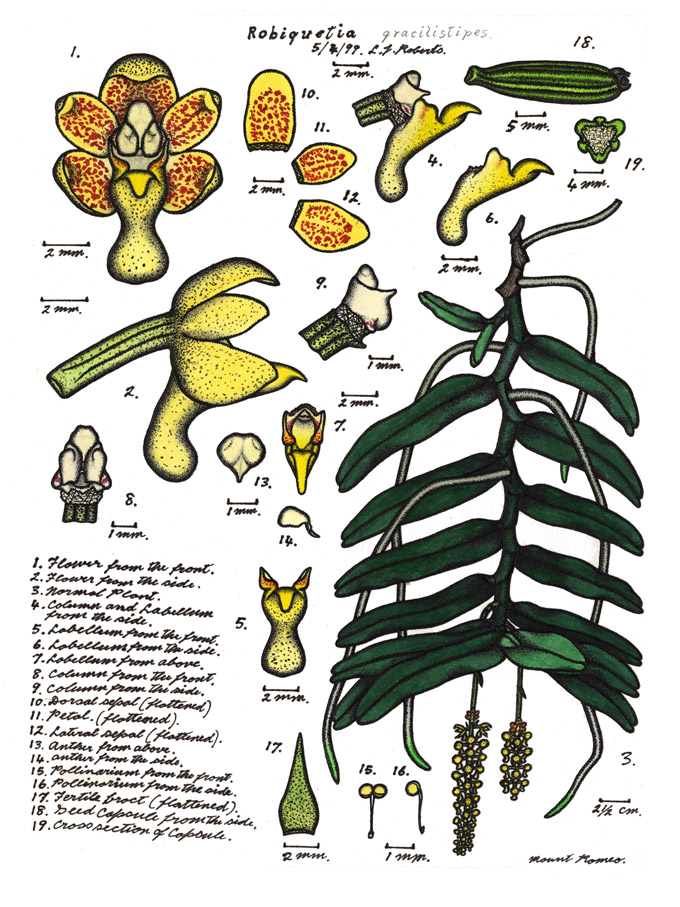
- Illustration by Lewis Roberts

Scientific classification
- Kingdom: Plantae
- Clade: Tracheophytes
- Clade: Angiosperms
- Clade: Monocots
- Order: Asparagales
- Family: Orchidaceae
- Subfamily: Epidendroideae
- Genus: Robiquetia
- Species: R. gracilistipes

Binomial name
- Robiquetia gracilistipes (Schltr.) J.J.Sm.

Synonyms
- Robiquetia squamulosa (J.J.Sm.) J.J.Sm.; Robiquetia tierneyana (Rupp) Dockrill; Saccolabium gracilistipes Schltr.; Saccolabium squamulosum J.J.Sm.; Saccolabium tierneyanum Rupp

= Robiquetia gracilistipes =

Species of orchid

Robiquetia gracilistipes, commonly known as large pouched orchid, is an epiphytic or lithophytic orchid from the family Orchidaceae that forms large, hanging, straggly clumps. It has long, thick, roots, a single stem, many thick, leathery leaves and up to forty cream-coloured, pale green or brownish flowers with red spots and a three-lobed labellum. It grows on trees and rocks in rainforest, usually in bright light. It is found in Malesia including New Guinea, the Solomon Islands and tropical North Queensland, Australia.

== Description ==
Robiquetia gracilistipes is an epiphytic or lithophytic herb that forms large, straggly hanging clumps. It has thick roots and a pendulous stem, 30–150 centimetres (12–59 in) long and about 6 millimetres (1/4 in) thick. There are many thick, leathery leaves 15–25 cm (5.9–9.8 in) long and 35–60 mm (1.4–2.4 in) wide. Between ten and forty resupinate, cup-shaped, cream-coloured, pale green or brownish flowers with red spots are crowded on a pendulous flowering stem 15–30 cm (5.9–12 in) long. The flowers are 9–11 mm (0.35–0.43 in) long, 6–7 mm (0.24–0.28 in) and are fragrant. The sepals and petals are fleshy, oblong to egg-shaped, 3–4 mm (0.12–0.16 in) long and about 2.5 mm (0.098 in) wide. The labellum is yellow, about 6 mm (0.24 in) long and 4 mm (0.16 in) wide with three lobes. The middle lobe is fleshy, about 2 mm (0.079 in) long with a downturned spur about 4 mm (0.16 in) long. Flowering occurs from March to May.

== Taxonomy and naming ==
Large pouched orchid was first formally described in 1905 by Rudolf Schlechter who gave it the name Saccolabium gracilistipes and published the description in Die Flora der Deutschen Schutzgebiete in der Sudsee und Nachtrage. In 1912 Johannes Jacobus Smith changed the name to Robiquetia gracilistipes. The specific epithet (gracilistipes) is derived from the Latin word gracilis meaning "slender" or "thin" and stipes meaning "stock", "stem" or "trunk".

== Distribution and habitat ==
Large pouched orchid grows on trees and rocks in rainforest, usually in strong light. It occurs in Malesia, including New Guinea, the Solomon Islands and Queensland, Australia where it is found from the Iron Range to Ingham.
