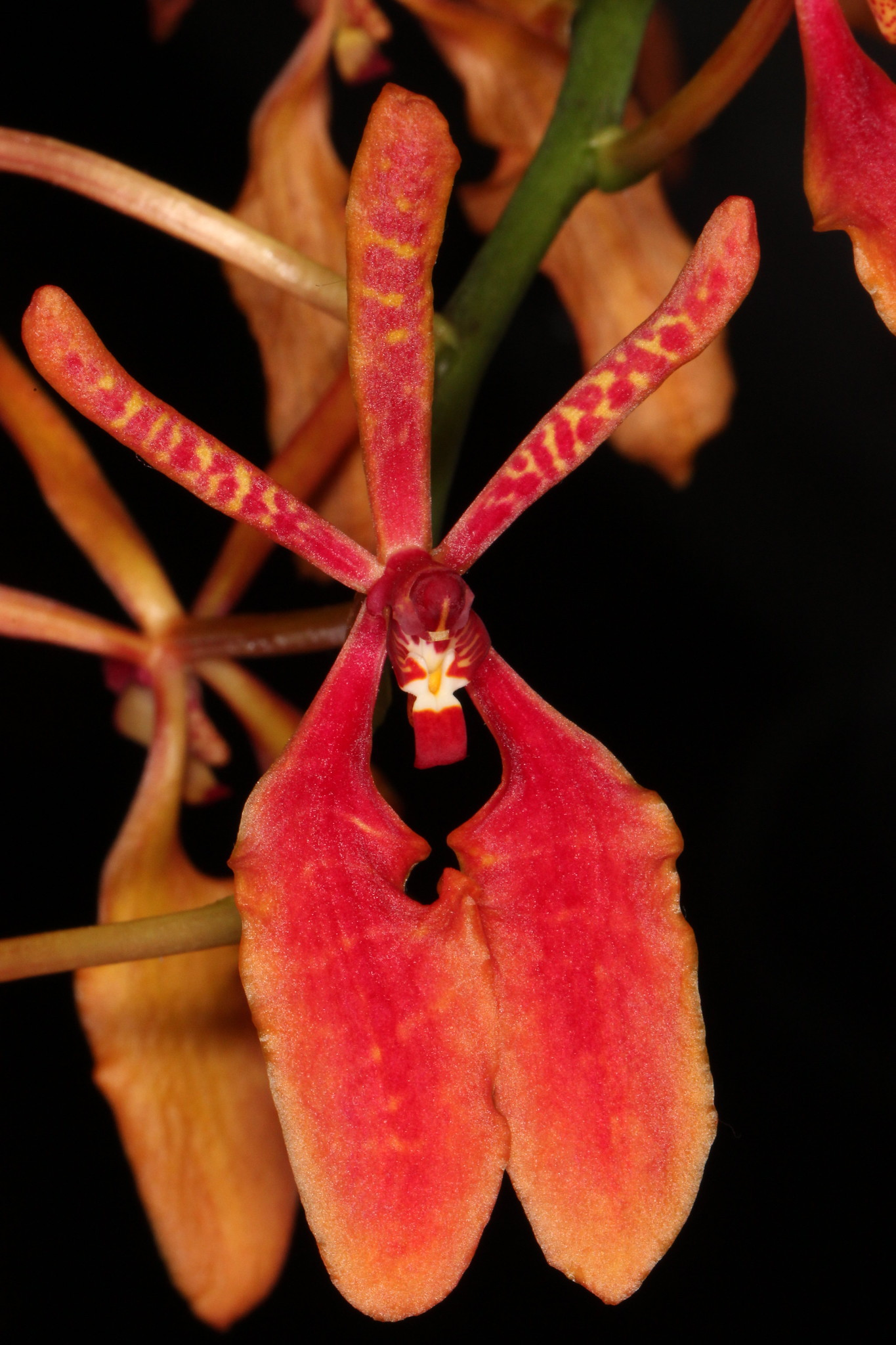
- Illustration of Renanthera coccinea flower

Scientific classification
- Kingdom: Plantae
- Clade: Embryophytes
- Clade: Tracheophytes
- Clade: Angiosperms
- Clade: Monocots
- Order: Asparagales
- Family: Orchidaceae
- Subfamily: Epidendroideae
- Genus: Renanthera
- Species: R. coccinea

Binomial name
- Renanthera coccinea Lour.

Synonyms
- Epidendrum renanthera Raeusch.

= Renanthera coccinea =

Species of orchid

Renanthera coccinea is a species of flowering plant in the family Orchidaceae. This orchid is native to Cambodia, South-Central and Southeast China, Hainan, Laos, Myanmar, Thailand, and Vietnam. It is the type species of the genus Renanthera.
