= Vanda falcata subsp. richardsiana =

Scientific classification
- Kingdom: Plantae
- Clade: Tracheophytes
- Clade: Angiosperms
- Clade: Monocots
- Order: Asparagales
- Family: Orchidaceae
- Subfamily: Epidendroideae
- Genus: Vanda
- Species: V. falcata
- Subspecies: V. f. subsp. richardsiana

Trinomial name
- Vanda falcata subsp. richardsiana (Christenson) Motes
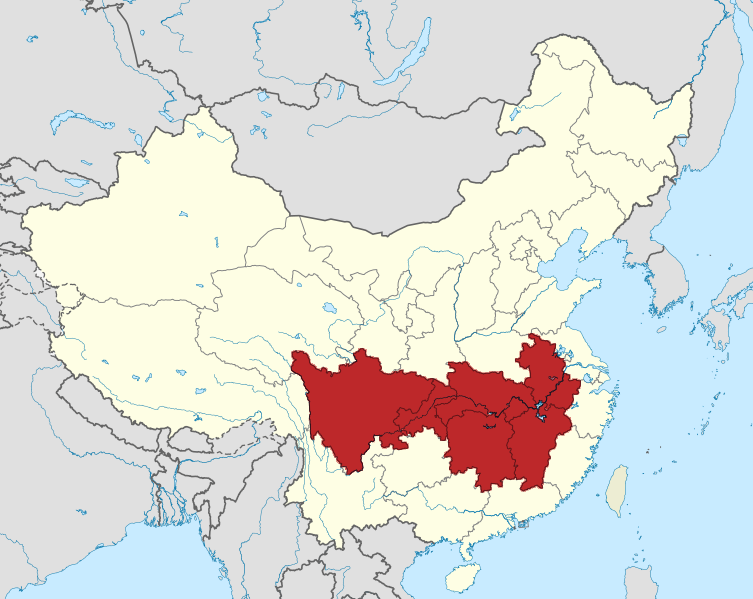
- Approximate distribution of Vanda falcata subsp. richardsiana

Synonyms
- Neofinetia richardsiana Christenson; Vanda richardsiana (Christenson) L.M.Gardiner

Subspecies of epiphytic orchid

Vanda falcata subsp. richardsiana is a subspecies of Vanda falcata. It is an epiphytic orchid native to North Chongqing, China.

== Description ==
The morphology closely resembles Vanda falcata, however the spur is significantly shorter.

== Conservation ==
Like all orchids, it is protected under the CITES appendix II regulations of international trade.
