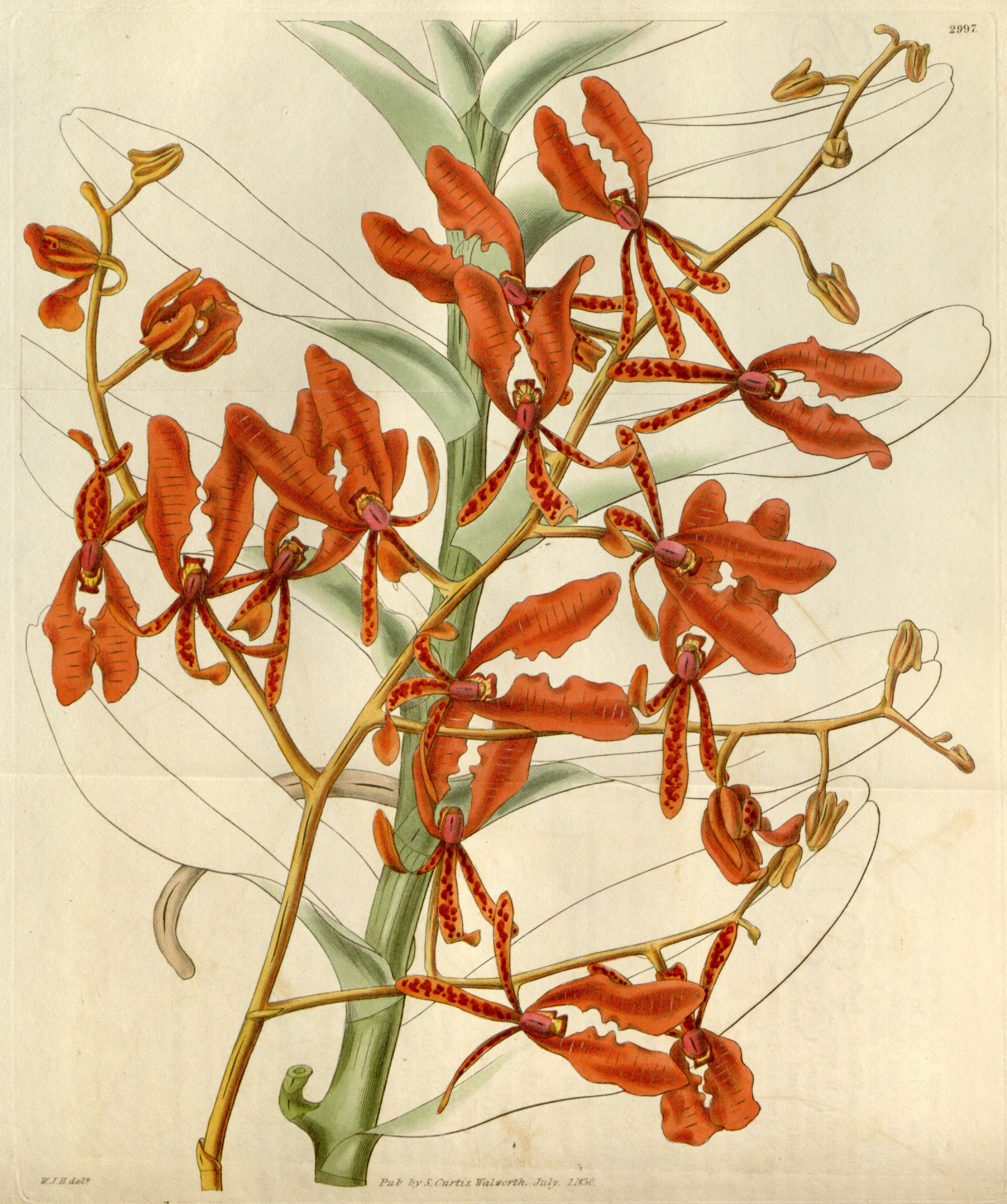
- Renanthera coccinea 1830 illustration

Scientific classification
- Kingdom: Plantae
- Clade: Embryophytes
- Clade: Tracheophytes
- Clade: Angiosperms
- Clade: Monocots
- Order: Asparagales
- Family: Orchidaceae
- Subfamily: Epidendroideae
- Tribe: Vandeae
- Subtribe: Aeridinae
- Genus: Renanthera; Lour. (1790)

Species
- Renanthera annamensis; Renanthera auyongii; Renanthera bella; Renanthera breviflora; Renanthera caloptera; Renanthera chanii; Renanthera citrina; Renanthera coccinea; Renanthera cornuta; Renanthera dentata; Renanthera elongata; Renanthera histrionica; Renanthera imschootiana; Renanthera isosepala; Renanthera matutina; Renanthera moluccana; Renanthera monachica; Renanthera philippinensis; Renanthera porphyrodesme; Renanthera pulchella; Renanthera storiei; Renanthera vietnamensis

Synonyms
- Ascoglossum Schltr.; Nephranthera Hassk.; Porphyrodesme Schltr.; Renantherella Ridl.

= Renanthera =

Genus of orchids

Renanthera, abbreviated as Ren in horticultural trade, is a genus of large scrambling monopodial epiphytic and terrestrial species of orchid found in China, the Himalayas, Southeast Asia, New Guinea, and Melanesia.

Species in this genus produce a branched inflorescence containing numerous flowers ranging in color from yellow and orange to red. These flowers possess large lateral sepals.

== Description ==
The following species ordered by sections are recognized by Plants of the World Online As of May 2024:

Image	Name	Distribution
	Renanthera annamensis Rolfe	Vietnam
	Renanthera auyongii Christenson	Borneo (Sarawak)
	Renanthera bella J.J.Wood	Borneo
	Renanthera breviflora (Rchb.f.) R.Rice & J.J.Wood	Borneo (Sabah, Sarawak) to Philippines (Sulu Islands)
	Renanthera caloptera (Rchb.f.) Kocyan & Schuit.	Philippines to Papuasia.
	Renanthera chanii J.J.Wood & R.Rice	Borneo (Sabah)
	Renanthera citrina Aver.	China (SE. Yunnan)
	Renanthera coccinea Lour.	China (SE. Yunnan, SW. Guangxi)
	Renanthera cornuta R.Rice	Philippines
	Renanthera dentata R.Rice	Borneo (Sarawak).
	Renanthera elongata (Blume) Lindl.	Thailand to W. Malesia and Philippines.
	Renanthera histrionica Rchb.f.	Thailand to Malaya
	Renanthera imschootiana Rolfe	Arunachal Pradesh to China (S. Yunnan)
	Renanthera isosepala Holttum	Myanmar to Peninsula Thailand.
	Renanthera matutina Lindl.	Malesia
	Renanthera moluccana Blume	Sulawesi to Papuasia.
	Renanthera monachica Ames	Philippines (Luzon).
	Renanthera philippinensis (Ames & Quisumb.) L.O.Williams	Philippines
	Renanthera porphyrodesme (Schltr.) Kocyan & Schuit.	Sumatera to Sulawesi, Papua New Guinea.
	Renanthera pulchella Rolfe	Myanmar
	Renanthera storiei Rchb.f.	Philippines.
	Renanthera vietnamensis Aver. & R.Rice	Vietnam

== Cultivation ==
Species in this genus usually require an intermediate to hot climate with good air movement and generally bright light. Their scrambling style of growth means they are best grown on a hanging mount or basket. If they are grown in pots there must be excellent drainage.
