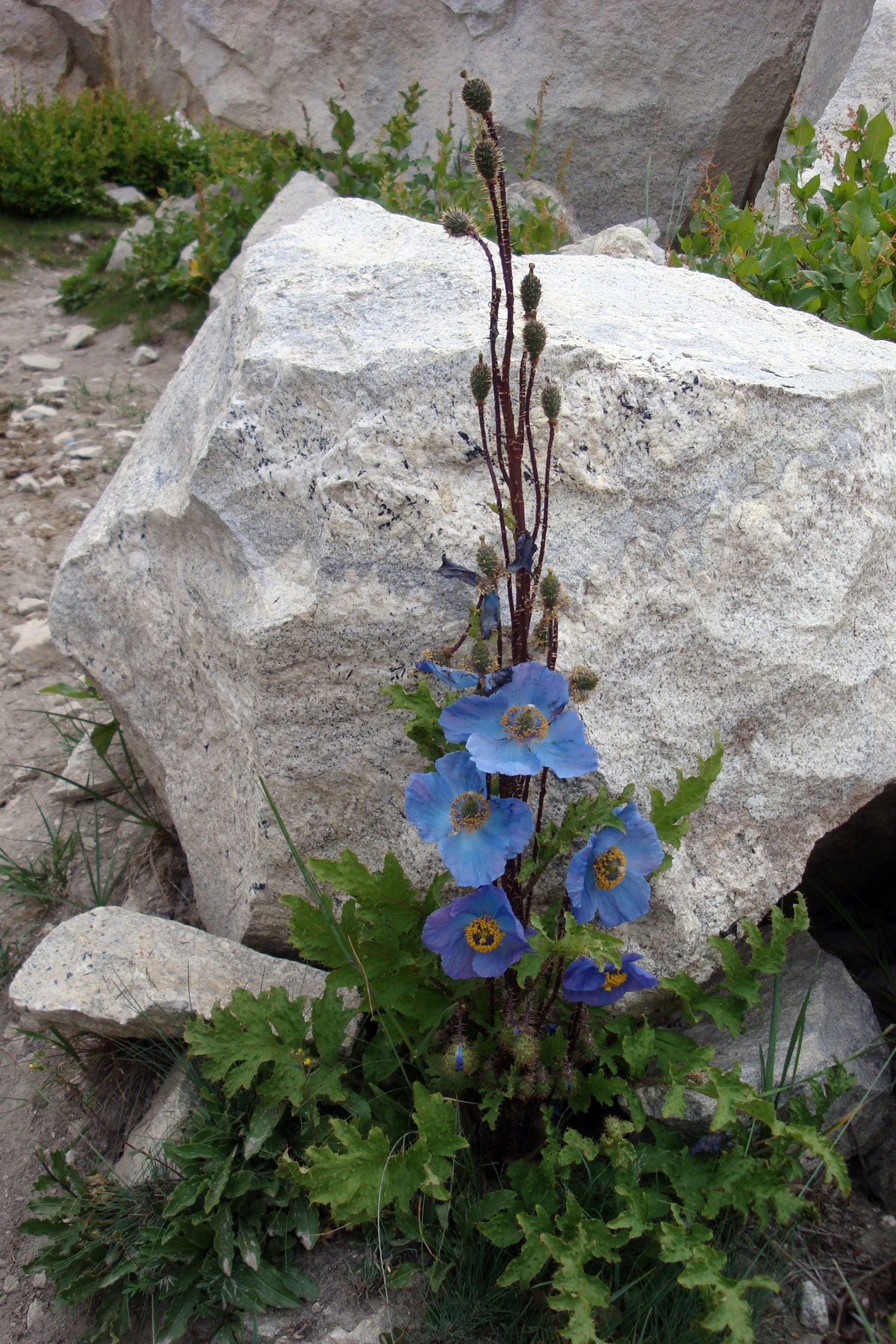

Scientific classification
- Kingdom: Plantae
- Clade: Embryophytes
- Clade: Tracheophytes
- Clade: Spermatophytes
- Clade: Angiosperms
- Clade: Eudicots
- Order: Ranunculales
- Family: Papaveraceae
- Genus: Meconopsis
- Species: M. aculeata

Binomial name
- Meconopsis aculeata Royle

= Meconopsis aculeata =

Species of flowering plant in the poppy family

Meconopsis aculeata is a blue-flowered thorny species of the genus Meconopsis with a small geographical distribution restricted to specific areas of Pakistan and India, in the west Himalayas. The species was described from specimens collected here, by Royle in 1833. It is also known as Bhoti 'Tsersnon' in Ladakh. Along with Juniperus polycarpos (also known as Bhoti 'Shukpa'), it is used in the Sowa-Rigpa (also known as Amchi system) traditional medicine system. Both have been proposed as the state flower and state tree respectively by the Ladakh administration.

The species is highly valued as a medicinal plant, and the resulting demand for the plant as medicine has placed pressure on wild populations due to over-collection.
