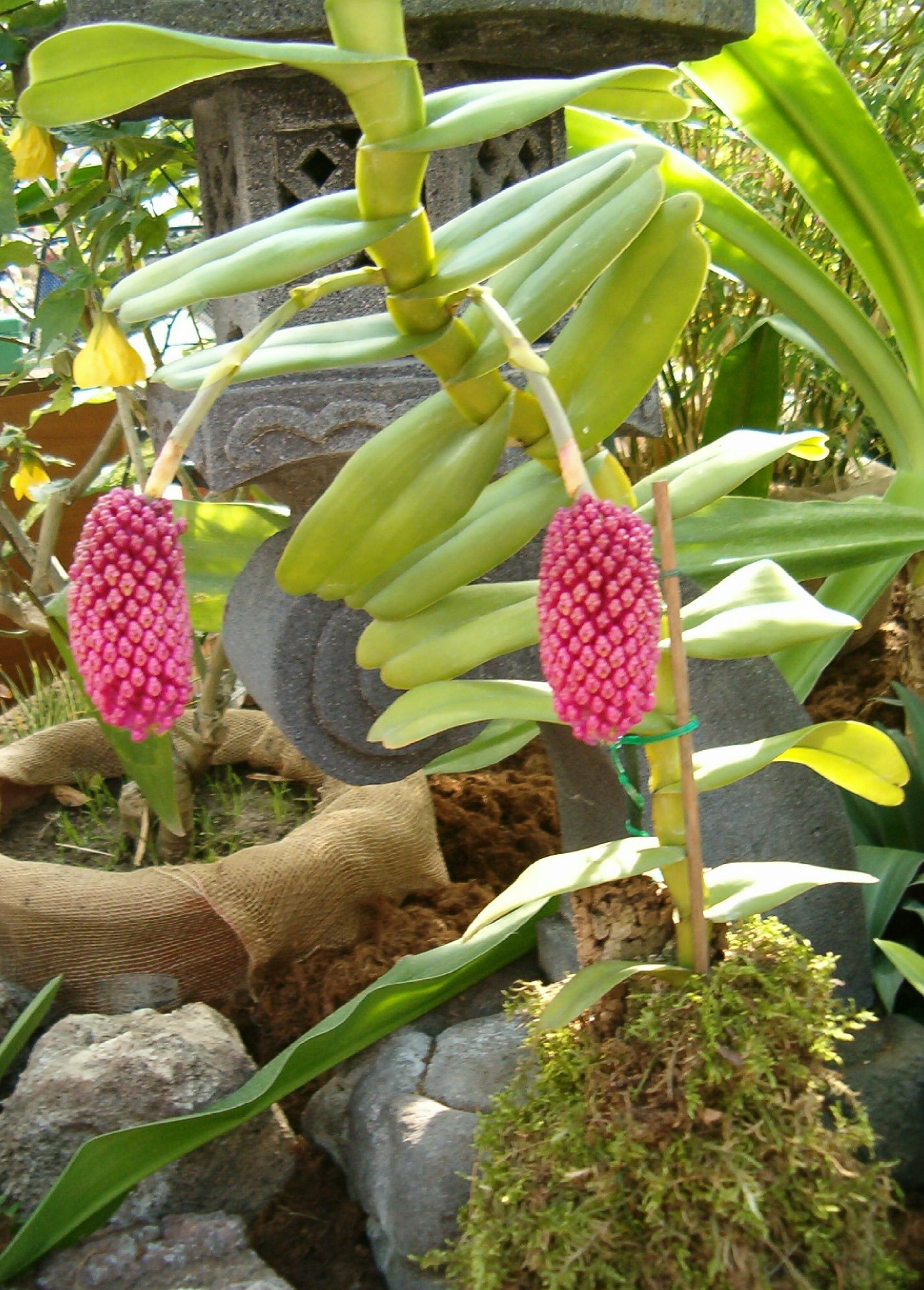
- Robiquetia cerina

Scientific classification
- Kingdom: Plantae
- Clade: Tracheophytes
- Clade: Angiosperms
- Clade: Monocots
- Order: Asparagales
- Family: Orchidaceae
- Subfamily: Epidendroideae
- Tribe: Vandeae
- Subtribe: Aeridinae
- Genus: Robiquetia; Gaudich.

Synonyms
- Malleola J.J.Sm. & Schltr.; Abdominea J.J.Sm.; Megalotus Garay; India A.N.Rao; Samarorchis Ormerod

= Robiquetia =

Genus of orchids

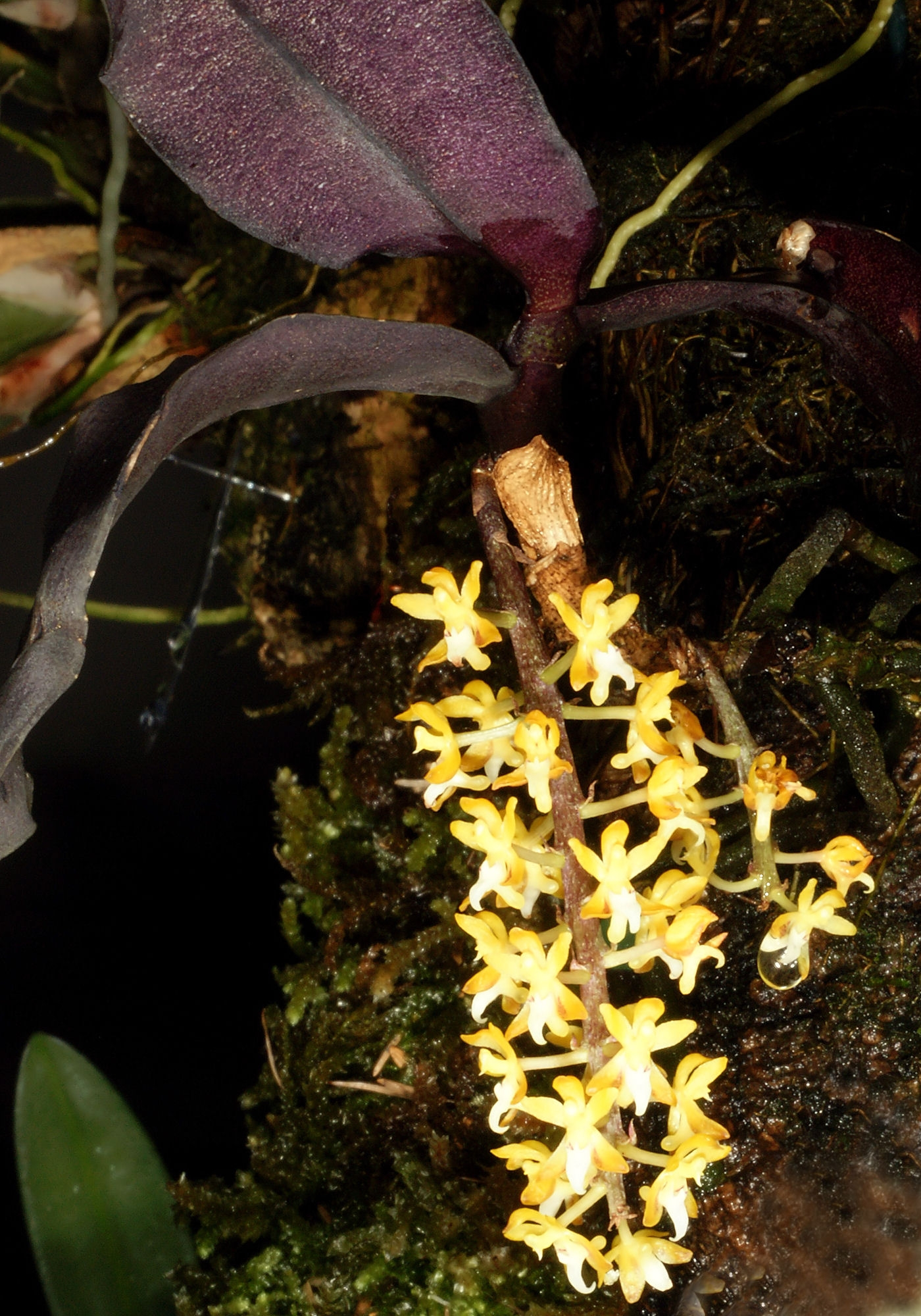
Robiquetia aberrans

Robiquetia, commonly known as pouched orchids, is a genus of flowering plants from the orchid family, Orchidaceae. Plants in this genus are epiphytes with long, sometimes branched, fibrous stems, leathery leaves in two ranks and large numbers of small, densely crowded flowers on a pendulous flowering stem. There are about eighty species found from tropical and subtropical Asia to the Western Pacific.

== Description ==
Orchids in the genus Robiquetia are epiphytic, monopodial herbs with pendulous, fibrous, sometimes branching stems and many smooth roots. The leaves are arranged in two ranks and are thick and leathery, oblong to elliptic, with a divided, asymmetrical, tip. Many small, densely crowded flowers are arranged on a pendulous flowering stem that emerges from a leaf axil. The sepals and petals are similar to each other and the labellum has three lobes and an inflated spur on its tip.

== Taxonomy and naming ==
The genus Robiquetia was first formally described in 1829 by Charles Gaudichaud-Beaupré and the description was published in his book Voyage autour du monde from a specimen collected in the Maluku Islands. The type species is Robiquetia ascendens. The name Robiquetia honours the French chemist Pierre Jean Robiquet.

In Chinese, members of this genus are known as 寄树兰属 (jì shù lán shǔ).)

Species list: The following is a list of species of Robiquetia accepted by the World Checklist of Selected Plant Families as of December 2018:

- Robiquetia aberrans (Schltr.) Kocyan & Schuit. - Thailand to Malesia
- Robiquetia adelineana P.O'Byrne - Malaysia
- Robiquetia amboinensis (J.J.Sm.) J.J.Sm. - Ambon
- Robiquetia amesiana Kocyan & Schuit.
- Robiquetia anceps J.J.Sm. - Ternate
- Robiquetia andamanica (N.P.Balakr. & N.Bhargava) Kocyan & Schuit.
- Robiquetia angustifolia Schltr. - Sulawesi
- Robiquetia arunachalensis (A.N.Rao) Kocyan & Schuit.
- Robiquetia ascendens Gaudich. - Maluku
- Robiquetia batakensis (Schltr.) Kocyan & Schuit.
- Robiquetia bertholdii (Rchb.f.) Schltr. - Fiji, Santa Cruz Islands, Tonga, Vanuatu
- Robiquetia bicruris J.J.Sm.
- Robiquetia bifida (Lindl.) Kocyan & Schuit.
- Robiquetia brassii Ormerod - New Guinea
- Robiquetia brevifolia (Lindl.) Garay - Sri Lanka
- Robiquetia brevisaccata (J.J.Sm.) Kocyan & Schuit.
- Robiquetia camptocentrum (Schltr.) J.J.Sm. - New Guinea
- Robiquetia cerina (Rchb.f.) Garay - Philippines
- Robiquetia cladophylax (Schltr.) Kocyan & Schuit.
- Robiquetia compressa (Lindl.) Schltr. - Philippines
- Robiquetia crassa (Ridl.) Schltr. - Sarawak
- Robiquetia crockerensis J.J.Wood & A.L.Lamb in J.J.Wood & al. - Sarawak, Sabah
- Robiquetia culicifera (Ridl.) Kocyan & Schuit.
- Robiquetia dentifera J.J.Sm. - Seram
- Robiquetia discolor (Rchb.f.) Seidenf. & Garay - Philippines
- Robiquetia dutertei Cootes, Naive & M.Leon
- Robiquetia eburnea (W.Suarez & Cootes) Kocyan & Schuit.
- Robiquetia enigma Ferreras & W.Suarez - Philippines
- Robiquetia flammea (R.Boos, Cootes & W.Suarez) Kocyan & Schuit.
- Robiquetia flexa (Rchb.f.) Garay - New Guinea
- Robiquetia forbesii (Ridl.) Kocyan & Schuit.
- Robiquetia gautierensis (J.J.Sm.) Kocyan & Schuit.
- Robiquetia glomerata (Rolfe) Kocyan & Schuit.
- Robiquetia gracilis (Lindl.) Garay - India, Sri Lanka, Andaman and Nicobar Islands
- Robiquetia gracilistipes (Schltr.) J.J.Sm. - Queensland, New Guinea, Solomons
- Robiquetia hamata Schltr. - New Guinea
- Robiquetia hansenii J.J.Sm - Mentawai
- Robiquetia honhoffii (Schuit. & A.Vogel) Kocyan & Schuit.
- Robiquetia inflata (Metusala & P.O'Byrne) Kocyan & Schuit.
- Robiquetia insectifera (J.J.Sm.) Kocyan & Schuit.
- Robiquetia josephiana Manilal & C.S.Kumar - Kerala
- Robiquetia juliae (P.O'Byrne) Kocyan & Schuit.
- Robiquetia kawakamii (J.J.Sm.) Kocyan & Schuit.
- Robiquetia kusaiensis Fukuy. - Kosrae
- Robiquetia ligulata (J.J.Sm.) Kocyan & Schuit.
- Robiquetia longipedunculata Schltr. - Sulawesi
- Robiquetia lutea (Volk) Schltr. - Caroline Islands
- Robiquetia lyonii (Ames) Kocyan & Schuit.
- Robiquetia millariae Ormerod - Solomons
- Robiquetia minahassae (Schltr.) J.J.Sm. - Sulawesi
- Robiquetia minimiflora (Hook.f.) Kocyan & Schuit.
- Robiquetia pachyphylla (Rchb.f.) Garay - Myanmar, Thailand, Vietnam
- Robiquetia palawensis Tuyama - Palau
- Robiquetia palustris (J.J.Sm.) Kocyan & Schuit.
- Robiquetia pantherina (Kraenzl.) Ames - Philippines
- Robiquetia penangiana (Hook.f.) Kocyan & Schuit.
- Robiquetia pinosukensis J.J.Wood & A.L.Lamb in J.J.Wood & al. - Sabah, Sarawak
- Robiquetia punctata (J.J.Wood & A.L.Lamb) Kocyan & Schuit.
- Robiquetia reflexa (R.Boos & Cootes) Kocyan & Schuit.
- Robiquetia rosea (Lindl.) Garay - Karnataka, Sri Lanka
- Robiquetia sanguinicors (P.O'Byrne & J.J.Verm.) Kocyan & Schuit.
- Robiquetia schizogenia (Ferreras, Cootes & R.Boos) J.M.H.Shaw
- Robiquetia serpentina (J.J.Sm.) Kocyan & Schuit.
- Robiquetia spathulata (Blume) J.J.Sm - Hainan, Bhutan, Cambodia, Assam, Indonesia, Laos, Malaysia, Myanmar, Singapore, Thailand, Vietnam
- Robiquetia sphingoides (J.J.Sm.) Kocyan & Schuit.
- Robiquetia steffensii (Schltr.) Kocyan & Schuit.
- Robiquetia succisa (Lindl.) Seidenf. & Garay - Fujian, Guangdong, Guangxi, Hainan, Yunnan, Bhutan, Cambodia, Assam, Laos, Myanmar, Thailand, Vietnam, Bangladesh
- Robiquetia sulitiana (Ormerod) Kocyan & Schuit.
- Robiquetia sylvestris (Ridl.) Kocyan & Schuit.
- Robiquetia tomaniensis J.J.Wood & A.L.Lamb - Sabah
- Robiquetia tongaensis P.J.Cribb & Ormerod - Tonga
- Robiquetia transversisaccata (Ames & C.Schweinf.) J.J.Wood in J.J.Wood & al. - Sabah, Sarawak
- Robiquetia trukensis Tuyama - Chuuk
- Robiquetia vanoverberghii Ames - Philippines
- Robiquetia vaupelii (Schltr.) Ormerod & J.J.Wood - Fiji, Samoa
- Robiquetia vietnamensis (Guillaumin) Kocyan & Schuit.
- Robiquetia virescens Ormerod & S.S.Fernando - Sri Lanka
- Robiquetia viridirosea J.J.Sm. - Buru, Seram
- Robiquetia wariana (Schltr.) Kocyan & Schuit.
- Robiquetia wassellii Dockrill - Queensland
- Robiquetia witteana (Rchb.f.) Kocyan & Schuit.
- Robiquetia woodfordii (Rolfe) Garay - Solomons

== Distribution ==
Orchids in the genus Robiquetia occur in China (2 species), the Indian subcontinent, Indochina, Malesia, New Guinea, the Solomon Islands, Fiji, Samoa, Tonga, Vanuatu and Queensland, Australia (2 species, 1 endemic).
