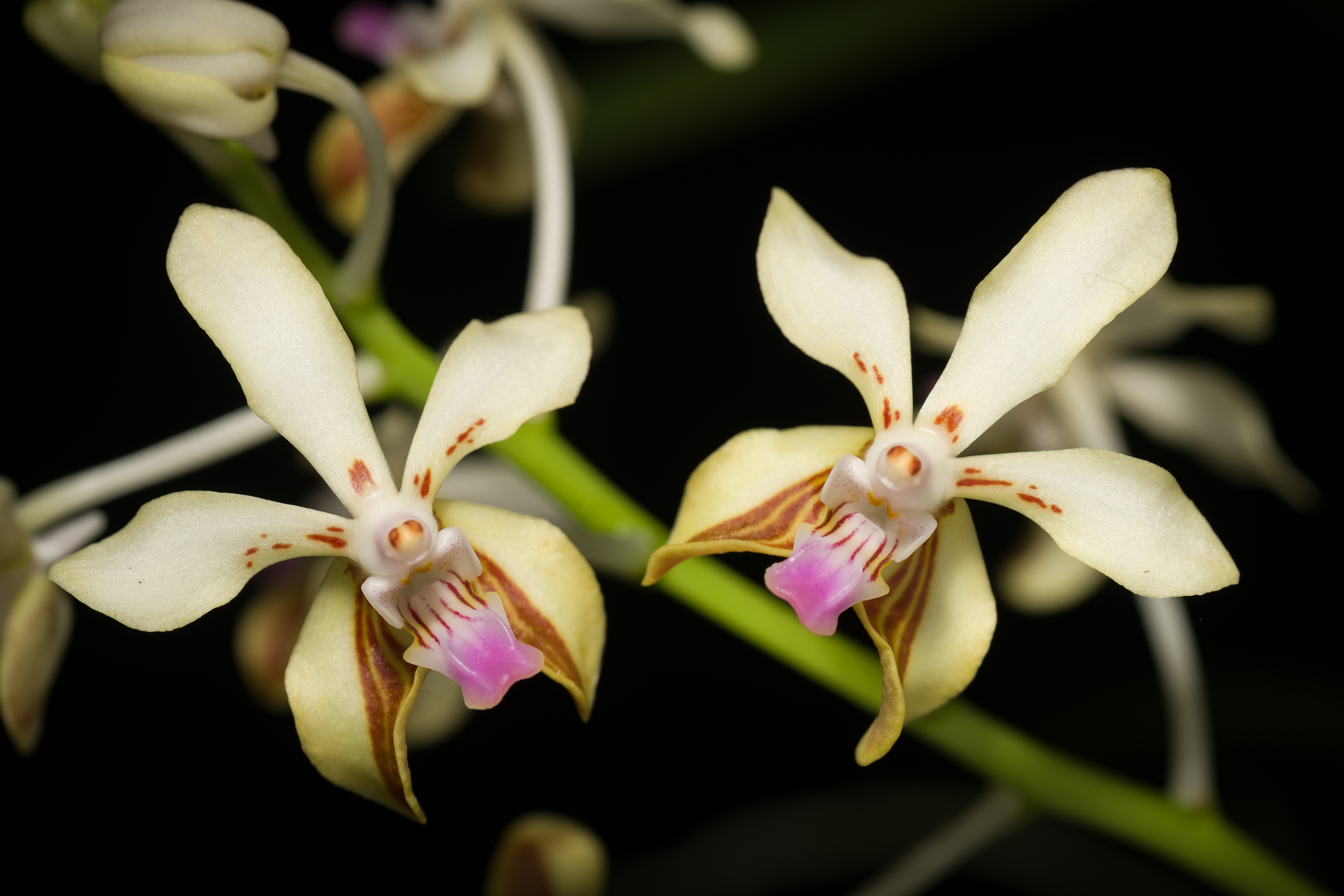
- Vanda lamellata f. remediosae

Scientific classification
- Kingdom: Plantae
- Clade: Tracheophytes
- Clade: Angiosperms
- Clade: Monocots
- Order: Asparagales
- Family: Orchidaceae
- Subfamily: Epidendroideae
- Genus: Vanda
- Species: V. lamellata

Binomial name
- Vanda lamellata Lindl. (1838)

Varieties
- 4; see text

Synonyms
- V. unicolor Steud.; V. cumingii W.Baxter; V. clitellaria Rchb.f.; V. lamellata var. boxallii Rchb.f.; V. vidalii Boxall ex Náves; V. boxallii (Rchb.f.) Rchb.f.; V. superba Linden & Rodigas; V. nasughuana Parsons; V. lamellata var. remediosae Ames & Quisumb.; V. amiensis Masam. & Segawa; V. lamellata f. alba Valmayor & D.Tiu; V. lamellata var. calayana Valmayor & D.Tiu

= Vanda lamellata =

Species of orchid

Vanda lamellata is a species of orchid. It is an epiphytic subshrub native to the Japanese Ryukyu Islands (Uotsuri-jima), southern Taiwan (including Lan Yü), the Philippines, the Mariana Islands, and northern Malaysian Borneo.

== Varieties ==
Four varieties are accepted.

- Vanda lamellata var. boxallii Rchb.f. – Philippines (Luzon)
- Vanda lamellata var. lamellata – northern Borneo, Ryukyu Islands (Uotsuri-jima), southern Taiwan (including Lan Yü), Philippines, and Marianas.
- Vanda lamellata var. remediosae Ames & Quisumb. – Philippines (Mindanao)
- Vanda lamellata var. taiwuensis S.S.Ying – Taiwan
