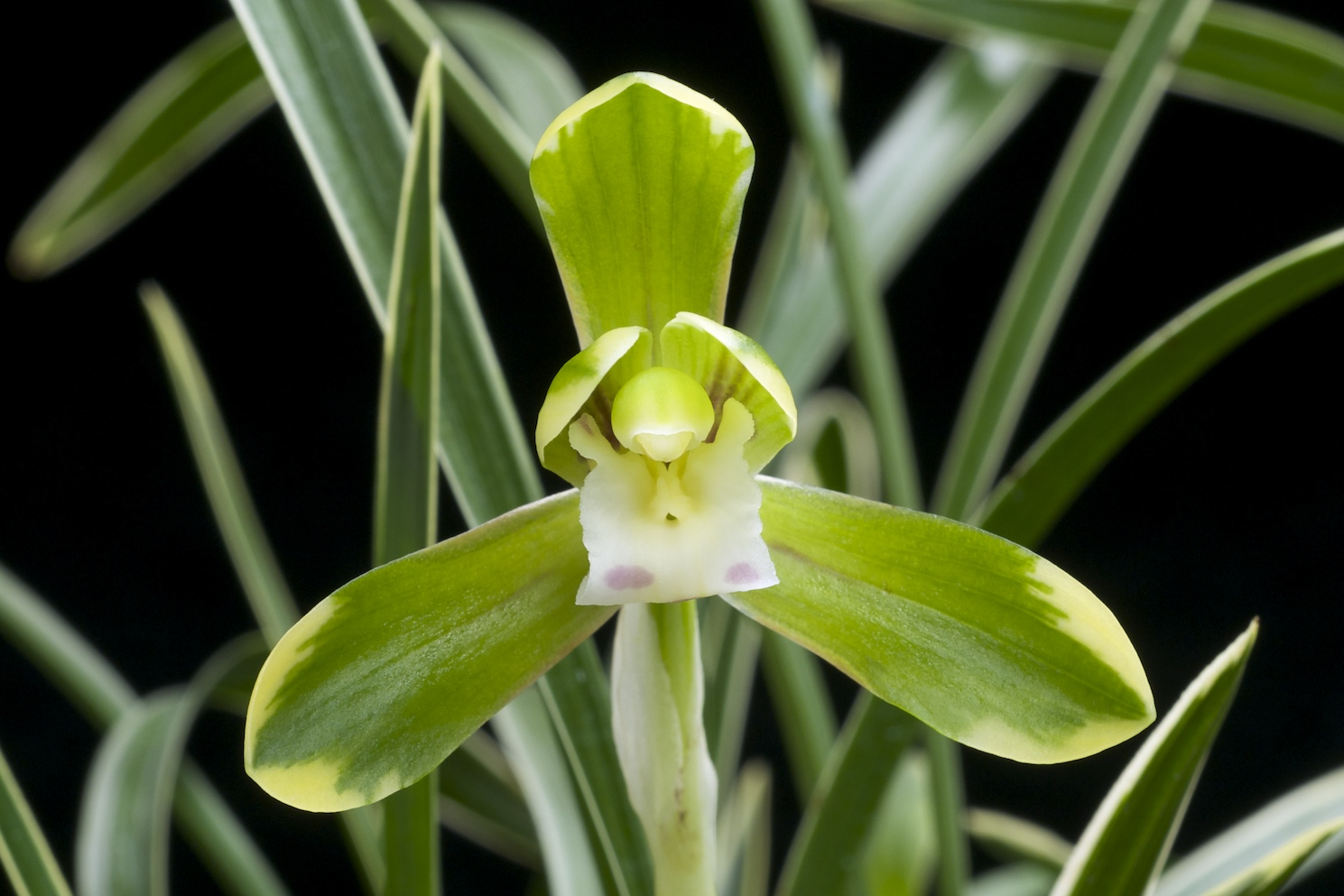

Conservation status
- CITES Appendix II

Scientific classification
- Kingdom: Plantae
- Clade: Tracheophytes
- Clade: Angiosperms
- Clade: Monocots
- Order: Asparagales
- Family: Orchidaceae
- Subfamily: Epidendroideae
- Genus: Cymbidium
- Species: C. goeringii

Binomial name
- Cymbidium goeringii (Rchb.f.) Rchb.f.

Synonyms
- Cymbidium virescens Lindl.; Maxillaria goeringii Rchb.f.; Cymbidium virens Rchb.f.; Cymbidium mackinnonii Duthie; Cymbidium forrestii Rolfe; Cymbidium yunnanense Schltr.; Cymbidium pseudovirens Schltr.; Cymbidium tentyozanense Masam.; Cymbidium uniflorum T.C.Yen; Cymbidium goeringii var. mackinnonii (Duthie) A.N.Rao

= Cymbidium goeringii =

Noble orchid

Species of orchid

Cymbidium goeringii, commonly known as chun lan (Chinese: 春兰), is a species of terrestrial orchid native to Asia including Bhutan, China, north-western India, Japan, and Korea.
