= Vanda falcata subsp. xichangensis =

Scientific classification
- Kingdom: Plantae
- Clade: Tracheophytes
- Clade: Angiosperms
- Clade: Monocots
- Order: Asparagales
- Family: Orchidaceae
- Subfamily: Epidendroideae
- Genus: Vanda
- Species: V. falcata
- Subspecies: V. f. subsp. xichangensis

Trinomial name
- Vanda falcata subsp. xichangensis (Z.J.Liu & S.C.Chen) Motes
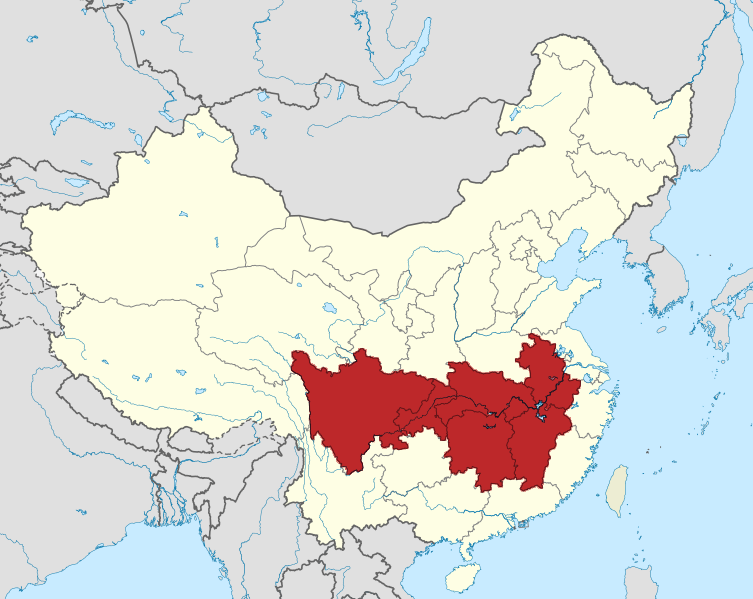
- Approximate distribution of Vanda falcata subsp. xichangensis

Synonyms
- Neofinetia xichangensis Z.J.Liu & S.C.Chen; Vanda xichangensis (Z.J.Liu & S.C.Chen) L.M.Gardiner

Subspecies of epiphytic orchid

Vanda falcata subsp. xichangensis is a subspecies of Vanda falcata. It is an epiphytic orchid native to Southwest Sichuan, China.

== Description ==
The morphology closely resembles Vanda falcata, however the spur is shorter.

== Conservation ==
Like all orchids, it is protected under the CITES appendix II regulations of international trade.
