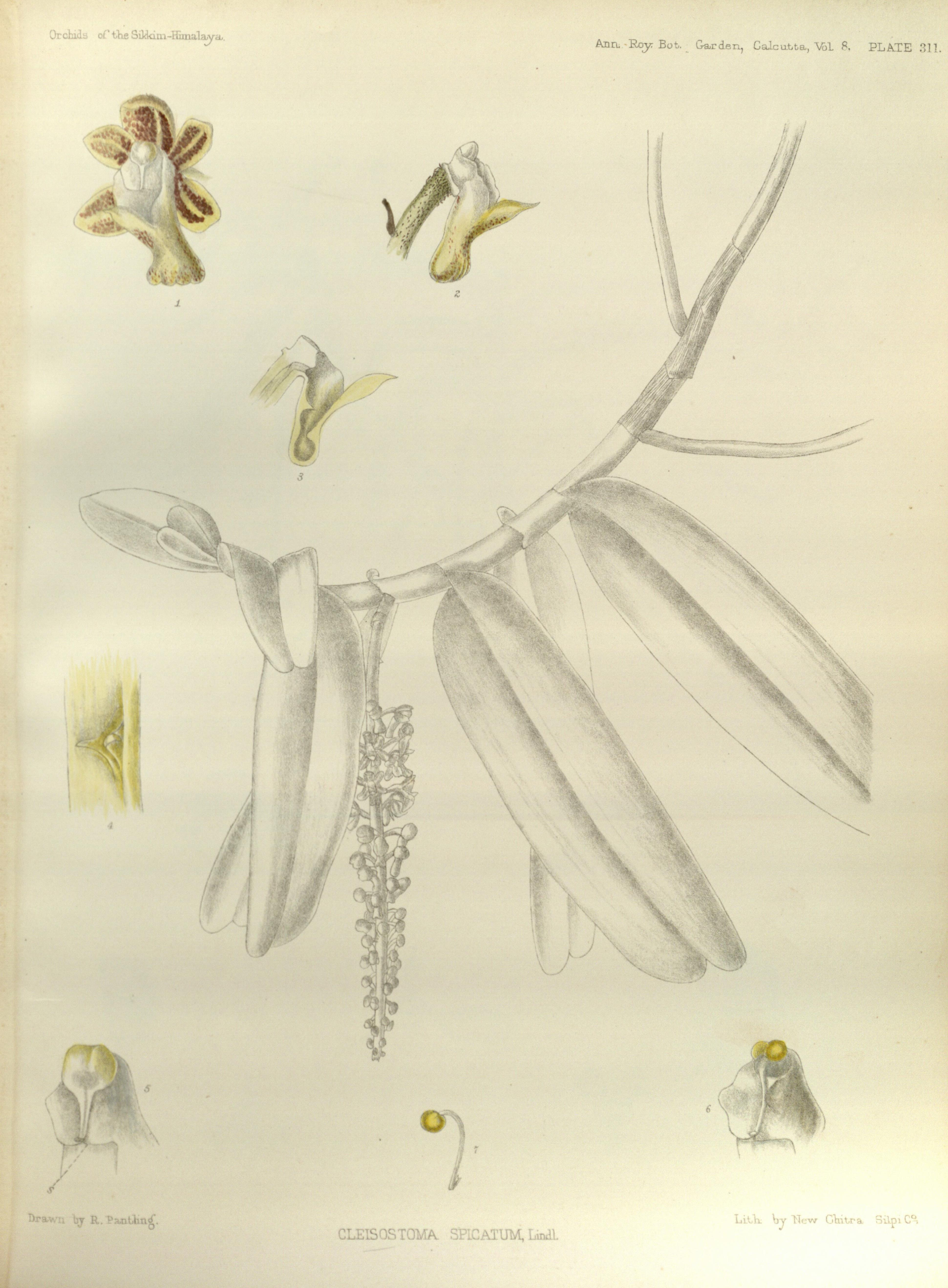

Scientific classification
- Kingdom: Plantae
- Clade: Tracheophytes
- Clade: Angiosperms
- Clade: Monocots
- Order: Asparagales
- Family: Orchidaceae
- Subfamily: Epidendroideae
- Genus: Robiquetia
- Species: R. spathulata

Binomial name
- Robiquetia spathulata (Blume) J.J. Sm. 1912.

= Robiquetia spathulata =

Species of orchid

Robiquetia spathulata, commonly known as the sheath-covered spathe robiquetia, is a species of pouched orchid. It is found from the Eastern Himalayas to Malesia.

== Distribution and habitat ==
Robiquetia spathulata is native to Assam, Bangladesh, Borneo, Cambodia, East Himalayas, Hainan, Jawa, Laos, Myanmar, the Philippines, Sulawesi, Sumatera, Thailand, Vietnam, and Peninsular Malaysia. Under natural conditions, it is typically found in forests at elevations of 400–800 meters.

== Description ==
Robiqeuetia spathulata is a medium to large sized epiphytic subshrub, sometimes growing to 1 m long.

The flowers are cup shaped, the petals and sepals are predominately yellow with brown or red blotches and the lip and column are "pale cream-yellow in colour". The flowers are typically 6–7 mm long, and are borne densely on an inflorescence about 15–30 cm long.

The leaves are obovate-oblong, with an unequal bi-lobed leaf tip. Each leaf is 18 cm long and 4.5 cm wide.
