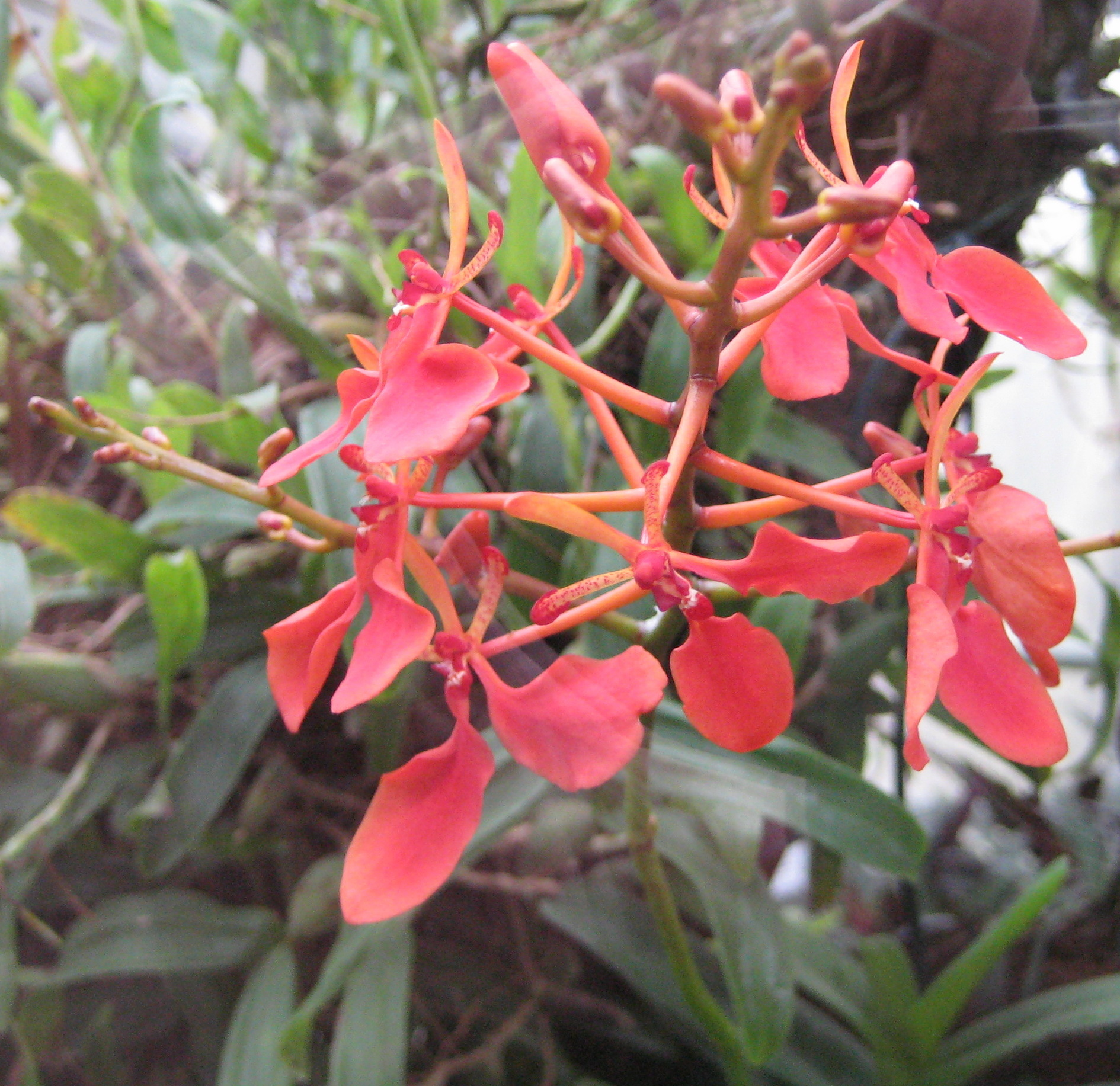
- Flower of Renanthera imschootiana

Conservation status
- CITES Appendix I

Scientific classification
- Kingdom: Plantae
- Clade: Embryophytes
- Clade: Tracheophytes
- Clade: Angiosperms
- Clade: Monocots
- Order: Asparagales
- Family: Orchidaceae
- Subfamily: Epidendroideae
- Genus: Renanthera
- Species: R. imschootiana

Binomial name
- Renanthera imschootiana Rolfe

Synonyms
- Renanthera papilio King & Prain

= Renanthera imschootiana =

Species of orchid

Renanthera imschootiana, also known as Red Vanda, is a species of orchid occurring from the eastern Himalaya to China (southeastern Yunnan) and Vietnam. It is listed under Schedule VI of Wildlife Protection Act, 1972 making it one of the plant species which is restricted from cultivation and planting and a special license is required to grow them.
