= Renanthera caloptera =

Conservation status
- Critically Endangered (IUCN 3.1)

Scientific classification
- Kingdom: Plantae
- Clade: Tracheophytes
- Clade: Angiosperms
- Clade: Monocots
- Order: Asparagales
- Family: Orchidaceae
- Subfamily: Epidendroideae
- Tribe: Vandeae
- Subtribe: Aeridinae
- Genus: Renanthera
- Species: R. caloptera

Binomial name
- Renanthera caloptera (Schltr.) Alexander Kocyan & Schuit.

Synonyms
- Ascoglossum calopterum (Rchb.f.) Schltr.; Ascoglossum purpureum (J.J.Sm.) Schltr.; Saccolabium calopterum Rchb.f.; Cleisostoma cryptochilum F.Muell.; Saccolabium schleinitzianum Kraenzl.; Saccolabium purpureum J.J.Sm.

Genus of plants

Renanthera caloptera is a species in the family Orchidaceae. It was formerly the only species in the monotypic genus Ascoglossum, abbreviated Ascgm in the horticultural trade. It is endemic to Dinagat Island in the southern Philippines and is critically endangered by collection as an ornamental plant and habitat loss. Its flowers are a vivid purple.

== Taxonomy ==
Renanthera caloptera was described in 1882 by Heinrich Gustav Reichenbach as Saccolabium calopterum. Its name was subsequently changed to Ascoglossum caloptera by Rudolf Schlecter. Finally, based on research published by Alexander Kocyan & Andre Schuiteman, its name was changed to Renanthera caloptera.

== Horticulture ==
The Royal Horticultural Society uses Renanthera caloptera for hybrid registration purposes.

Before that 2014 taxonomic revision, Ascoglossum formed several different intergeneric hybrids (nothogenera):

Ascoglossum × Renanthera (Ren.)	Renanthoglossum (Rngm.)
Ascoglossum × Aerides (Aer.)	Nonaara (Non.)
Ascoglossum × Arachnis	Ngara (Ngara)
Ascoglossum × Paraphalaenopsis	Ascoparanthera (Apn.)
Ascoglossum × Phalaenopsis (Phal.)	Dresslerara (Dres.)
Ascoglossum × Rhynchostylis	Lauara (Lauara)
Ascoglossum × Trichoglottis	Sheehanara (Shn.)
Ascoglossum × Vanda	Pantapaara (Pntp.)
Ascoglossum × Vandopsis	Freedara (Fdra.)

Orchid hybrids are registered with The International Register at the Royal Horticultural Society. One primary hybrid was originated and registered by A.Kolopaking in 1989 as Renanthoglossum Nina Rach (Ascoglossum purpureum × Renanthera monachica). As of 2014, this is classified as Renanthera Nina Rach.
