= Vasquez =

Vásquez (Spanish pronunciation: [ˈbas.keθ]; English pronunciation: /ˈvæs.kɛs/, VASS-kess) is a surname of Galician origin, which later spread all over the Spanish-speaking world. Alternative spellings of the name include Vázquez or Vasques (particularly in regions with seseo), and Vasquez or Vazquez (in countries where Iberian languages are not commonly spoken).

== Overview ==
To a lesser extent it also occurs in Portuguese-speaking countries (spelled Vasques), where Vasco is also used as a surname. Vasquez means "[son] of Vasco", and Vasco comes from the pre-Roman latinized name "Velascus", a name of uncertain origin and meaning, but probably Basque or Iberian. In Galician-Portuguese the pre-Roman name becomes Velascu > Veascu > Vaasco > Vasco.

In some Spanish-speaking countries, families of non-Iberian ancestry have also adopted this surname. In Colombia and Argentina, there have been instances of "Watzke" and "Watzka" families, of German-Czech descent, Hispanicizing their surnames to "Vasquez". The surname was chosen as being the one most closely resembling their former name; in Italy a similar phenomenon was noted with some "Watzke" changing to "Vasco".

There are also Spanish cognate surnames Velasco and Velázquez/Velazquez.

== List of people with this surname ==
=== Vasquez or Vásquez ===
- Andrés Vasquez (born 1987), Peruvian-born Swedish football midfielder
- Andrew Vasquez, Native American flute player
- Andrew Vasquez (baseball) (born 1993), American baseball player
- Angélica Delfina Vásquez Cruz (born 1958), Mexican potter
- Anthony Vasquez, baseball player
- Auristela Vásquez, Venezuelan politician
- Camille Vasquez (born 1984), American lawyer known for representing Johnny Depp in the Depp vs Heard civil case
- Catalina Vasquez Villalpando (born 1940), treasurer of the United States
- Chalena Vásquez (1950–2016), Peruvian ethnomusicologist and folklorist
- Christian Vasquez (born 1977), Filipino actor and model
- Christian Vásquez (born 1984), Venezuelan conductor and violinist
- Domingo Vásquez (1846–1909), president of Honduras 1893–1894
- Eric Vasquez (born 1982), American soccer player
- Ester Vázquez (born 1973), Spanish chemist, educator
- Fabio Vásquez Castaño (1940–2019), Colombian rebel and revolutionary
- Fernando Vásquez (born 1962), Bolivian mining engineer
- Francisco Vásquez de Coronado (1510–1554), Spanish conquistador
- Gabe Vasquez, New Mexico politician
- Gabriel Vásquez (1549–1604), Spanish Jesuit theologian
- Gaddi Vasquez (born 1955), 8th United States Representative to the United Nations Food and Agriculture Organization
- Greivis Vásquez (born 1987), Venezuelan basketball player
- Horacio Vásquez (1860–1936), Dominican general and political figure
- Jhonen Vasquez (born 1974), Californian cartoonist
- Jorge Vásquez (born 1978), major league baseball pitcher
- Joseph Vásquez (1962–1995), American independent filmmaker
- Juan Vásquez (composer), Spanish priest and composer of the renaissance
- Juanes (born 1972), full name Juan Esteban Aristizábal Vásquez (Vásquez is his second, or matrilineal, last name), Colombian rock musician
- Julio César Vásquez (born 1965), Argentine boxer in the super middleweight division
- Junior Vasquez (born 1949), New York City club DJ and remixer/producer
- Louis Vásquez (1798–1868), mountain man and trader from Missouri
- Lucas Vásquez de Ayllón (c. 1480–1526), Spanish explorer
- Luis Vásquez (footballer) (born 1996), Colombian football goalkeeper
- Luis Vasquez (American football) (born 1986), American football player
- Martín Vásquez (born 1963), Mexican soccer player, also played for US team
- Mona Vasquez (1960–2011), French critic of Scientology
- Nestor Vasquez (died 2019), Belizean shooting victim
- Orlando Vásquez (weightlifter, born 1969), Nicaraguan weightlifter
- Randy Vasquez (born 1961), American actor
- Rafael Vásquez (disambiguation), multiple people
- Roberta Vasquez (born 1963), Cuban-American model, actress and Playboy playmate
- Roberto Vásquez (born 1983), southpaw boxer in the flyweight division
- Sam Vasquez (1972–2007), American MMA fighter
- Sofronio Vasquez (born 1992), Filipino singer and champion of the season 26 of The Voice USA
- Tiburcio Vásquez (1835–1875), Mexican bandit
- Walter Vásquez Vejarano (born 1932), Peruvian lawyer, politician and President of the Supreme Court

=== Vázquez or Vazquez ===
- Adrián Vázquez Lázara (born 1982), Spanish politician
- Adrián Vázquez Núñez (born 2004), Spanish footballer
- Álvaro Vázquez (born 1991), Spanish footballer
- Ana Paula Vázquez (born 2000), Mexican archer
- Andrés Vázquez (1932–2022), Spanish bullfighter
- Angie Vázquez (born 2001), Mexican singer
- Christian Vázquez (born 1990), Puerto Rican baseball catcher
- Christian Vázquez (actor), Mexican actor
- Cristian Vázquez (born 1998), Argentine footballer
- Dolors Vázquez Aznar (1955–2014), Spanish painter
- Felipe Vázquez (born 1991), Venezuelan baseball player
- Fernando Vázquez (born 1954), Spanish football manager
- Fran Vázquez (born 1983), Spanish basketball player
- Franco Vázquez (born 1989), Italo-Argentine footballer
- Guillermo Vázquez (disambiguation), multiple people
- Hugo Vázquez (born 1968), Uruguayan basketball player
- Ignacio Vázquez (footballer, born 1971), Mexican footballer
- Israel Vázquez (1977–2024), Mexican boxer
- Javier Vázquez (born 1976), Puerto Rican-American baseball pitcher
- Jorge Vázquez (baseball) (born 1982), New York Yankees minor league first baseman
- Jorge Vázquez Viaña (1939–1967), Bolivian revolutionary
- Juan T. Vázquez Martín (1940–2017), Cuban abstract painter
- La La (entertainer) (born 1979), Puerto Rican MTV VJ
- Lucas Vázquez (born 1991), Spanish footballer
- Manuel Vázquez Gallego (1930–1995), Spanish comic artist and writer
- Manuel Vázquez Montalbán (1939–2003), Spanish writer
- Mario Vazquez (born 1977), New York Puerto Rican singer, from American Idol
- Mathias Vazquez (born 2008), Brazilian basketball player
- Miguel Vázquez (born 1987), Mexican boxer
- Myrna Vázquez (1935–1975), Puerto Rican actress and community activist
- Olegario Vázquez Raña (1935–2025), Mexican sports shooter and entrepreneur
- Pepe Luis Vázquez Garcés (1921–2013), Spanish bullfighter
- Pepe Luis Vázquez Silva (1957–2024), Spanish bullfighter
- Rafael Martín Vázquez (born 1965), Spanish footballer
- Ramón Vázquez (born 1976), Puerto Rican baseball player and coach
- Sebastián Vázquez (basketball) (born 1985), Uruguayan basketball player
- Tabaré Vázquez (1940–2020), President of Uruguay
- Victor Vazquez (born 1983), better known as Kool A.D., American musician and artist
- Víctor Vázquez (artist), Puerto Rican photographer and conceptual artist
- Víctor Vázquez Rosales (born 1989), Spanish footballer
- Víctor Vázquez Solsona (born 1987), Spanish footballer
- Wanda Vázquez, Puerto Rico Secretary of Justice, politician and Governor of Puerto Rico

== Fictional characters ==
- Vasquez, a supporting character from the film Aliens
- Alexandra "Alex" Vasquez, one of the three main characters of the animated television series Totally Spies!
- Esmeralda "Ezzy" Vasquez, a character from the video game Real Heroes: Firefighter
- Jonah Vasquez, a character from the video game Dead by Daylight
- Jared Vasquez, an NYPD officer, detective and lieutenant from Manifest (TV series).
- Dee Vasquez, a high-ranking producer of the series, Steel Samurai. Ace Attorney
