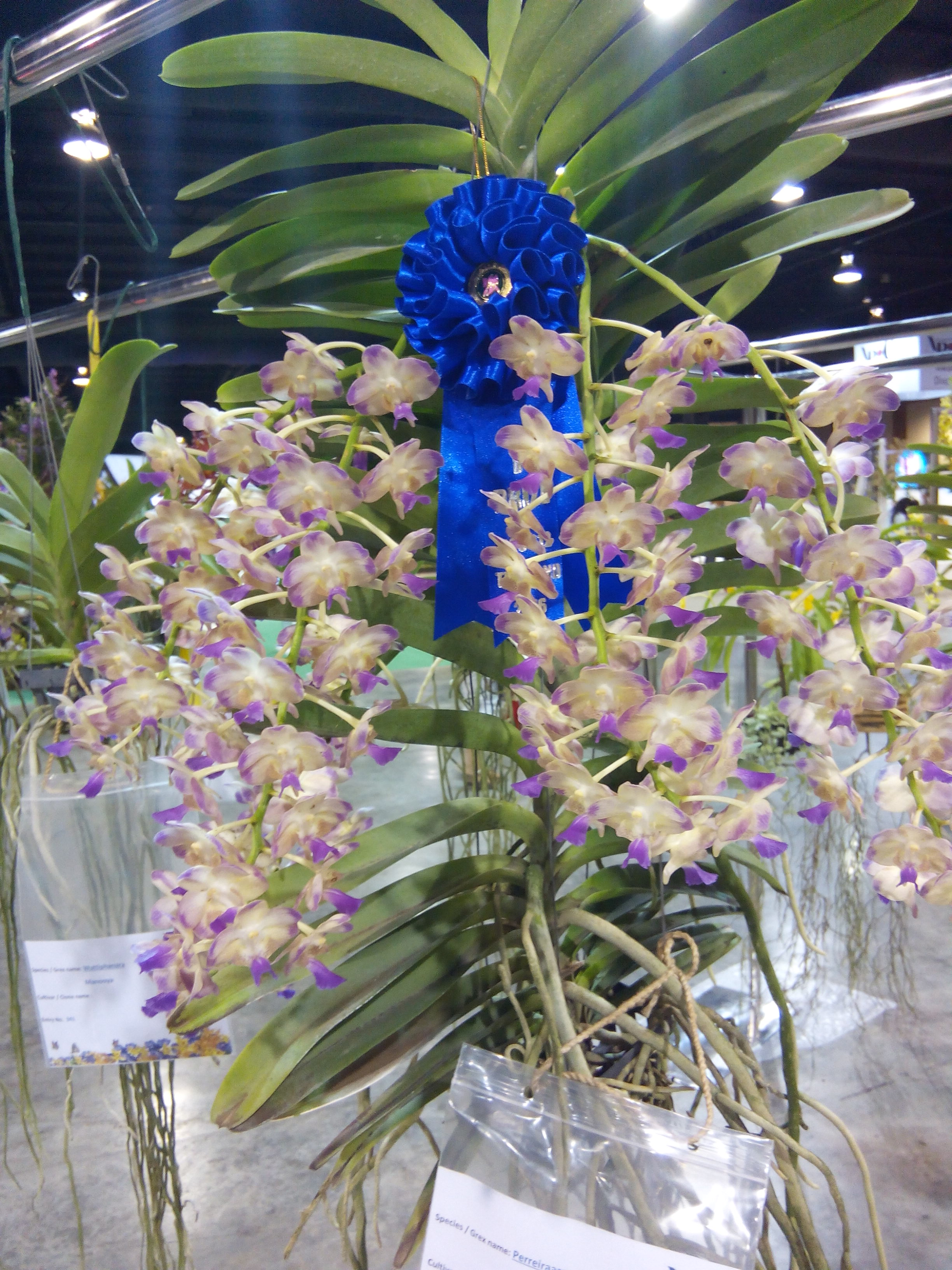

Scientific classification
- Kingdom: Plantae
- Clade: Tracheophytes
- Clade: Angiosperms
- Clade: Monocots
- Order: Asparagales
- Family: Orchidaceae
- Subfamily: Epidendroideae
- Tribe: Vandeae
- Subtribe: Aeridinae
- Genus: × Perreiraara hort.

= × Perreiraara =

Genus of orchids

× Perreiraara, abbreviated Prra. in the horticultural trade (although sometimes mistakenly listed as Perr.), is the nothogenus for intergeneric hybrids between the orchid genera Aerides, Rhynchostylis and Vanda (Aer. x Rhy. x V.).

In recent years, popular varieties of this genus for home growers include Prra. 'Bangkok Sunset', Prra. 'Sunshine Padriew' (a 'Bangkok Sunset' crossed back to a Rhynchostylis gigantea), Prra. Rapeepath (a 'Bangkok Sunset' crossed to × Vandachostylis 'Pine Rivers'), and Prra. 'LeBeau Blue' (an Aerides lawrenceae × Vandachostylis 'Sasicha').
