= Vasko =

Vasko may refer to:

- Vaskő, Hungarian name of Ocna de Fier
- Vasko (given name)
- Vasko (surname)

== See also ==
- Vasco (disambiguation)
