= Rhynchostylis cymifera =

Scientific classification
- Kingdom: Plantae
- Clade: Tracheophytes
- Clade: Angiosperms
- Clade: Monocots
- Order: Asparagales
- Family: Orchidaceae
- Subfamily: Epidendroideae
- Genus: Rhynchostylis
- Species: R. cymifera

Binomial name
- Rhynchostylis cymifera Yohannan, J.Mathew & Szlach.
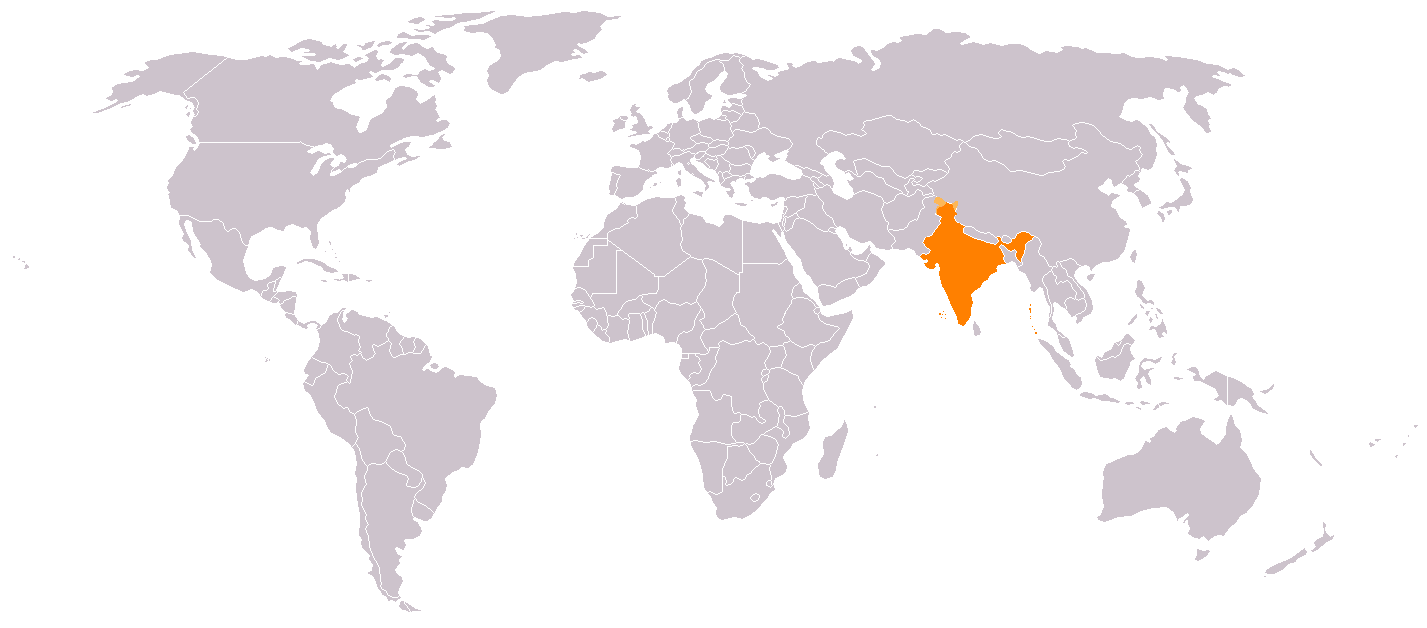
- Distribution of Rhynchostylis cymifera

Species of orchid

Rhynchostylis cymifera is a species of orchid endemic to India. The specific epithet "cymifera", meaning "cyme bearing", refers to the pendent, basipetal, cymose inflorescences, which are very atypical for the genus and separates this species from others. Its morphology is very similar to Rhynchostylis retusa. Flowering occurs from May to June.

== Conservation ==
This species is rarely recorded (nine times to date) and is regarded as critically endangered. However an assessment by the IUCN has still not been made. Anthropogenic habitat destruction and wildfires pose a risk to the species.
