= G. giganteus =

G. giganteus may refer to:

- Geosaurus giganteus, an extinct marine crocodyliform reptile species from Western Europe of the Late Jurassic
- Gigantopithecus giganteus, an extinct large ape species that lived in what is now India
- Gymnopilus giganteus, a mushroom species

== Synonyms ==
- Gastrochilus giganteus, a synonym for Rhynchostylis gigantea, an orchid species
