= S. giganteum =

S. giganteum may refer to:

- Saccolabium giganteum, a synonym for Rhynchostylis gigantea, an orchid species found in Myanmar, Thailand, Malaysia, Laos, Cambodia, Vietnam, Hainan China, Borneo and the Philippines
- Sequoiadendron giganteum, the giant sequoia, Sierra redwood or Wellingtonia, a massive tree species
- Sivatherium giganteum, an extinct species of giraffid that ranged throughout Africa to the Indian Subcontinent

== See also ==
- Giganteum
