= Vasko (surname) =

Vasko, Vaško, Vaskó are surnames. Notable people with the surnames include:

- Alexa Vasko (born 1999), Canadian ice hockey forward
- Elmer Vasko (1935–1998), Canadian professional ice hockey defenceman
- Ethan Vasko, American football quarterback
- Filip Vaško (born 1999), Slovak footballer
- Kálmán Vaskó (1872–1932), Hungarian coxswain
- Natalya Vasko (born 1972), Ukrainian actress and television presenter
- Peter Vaško (born 1987), Slovak association football player
- Rick Vasko (born 1957), Canadian ice hockey player
- Tamás Vaskó (born 1984), Hungarian football player
- Václav Vaško (1921–2009), Czech historian and writer
- Vesna Vaško (born 1971), birth name of Vesna Cáceres, Czech composer, singer and accordionist

== Fictional characters ==
- Jane Vasko in Painkiller Jane

== See also ==
- Vasko (given name)
