= ANOTA =

ANOTA or Anota may refer to:

- Amma Nanna O Tamila Ammayi, a Tollywood film
- Anota Schltr., a synonym of the orchid genus Rhynchostylis
- Anota Gray, 1863, a synonym of the turtle genus Pelusios
