= Castle of Castilnovo =

Castle in Segovia, Castile and León, Spain

Coordinates: 41°14′15″N 3°45′38″W

Castillo de Castilnovo
- Condado de Castilnovo in Spain
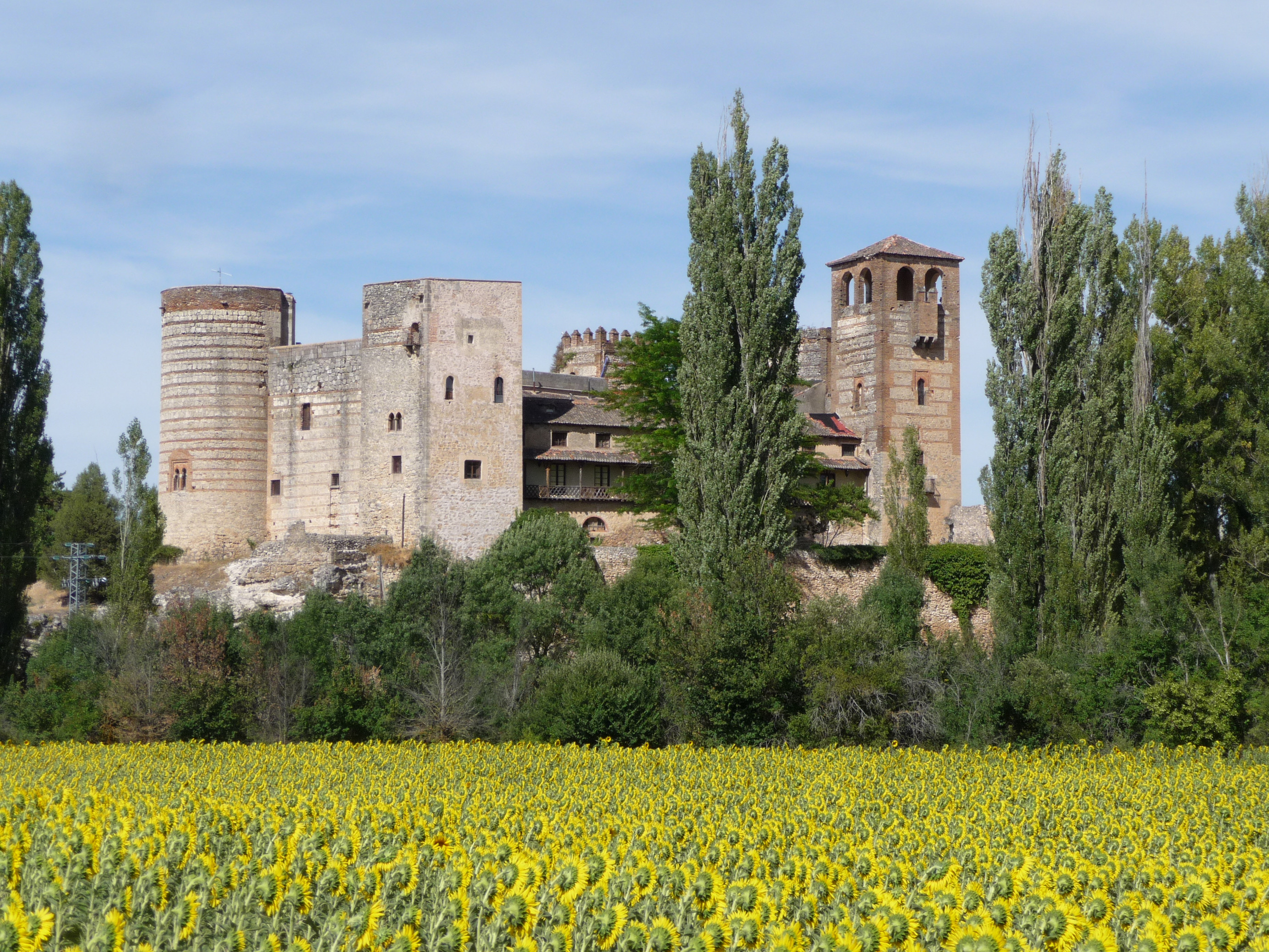

Site information
- Type: Castle

The Castle of Castilnovo is located near the little village of Villafranca (Condado de Castilnovo) in the province of Segovia, Castile and León, in Spain. It was declared Bien de Interés Cultural (National monument) on 3 June 1931.

Built in different stages, being the earliest the 8th century, according to some, and the 12th century, according to others. Its initial construction was executed by the Arabs in mudejar style, with later additions by the later Christian owners. The castle is conserved in good condition. It has a rectangular plan, with six round and square towers.

The Castle was enlarged by Álvaro de Luna and lived in by Ferdinand and Isabella during their travels through the country.

It was the property of the Catholic Monarchs, and through inheritance to the Velasco family.

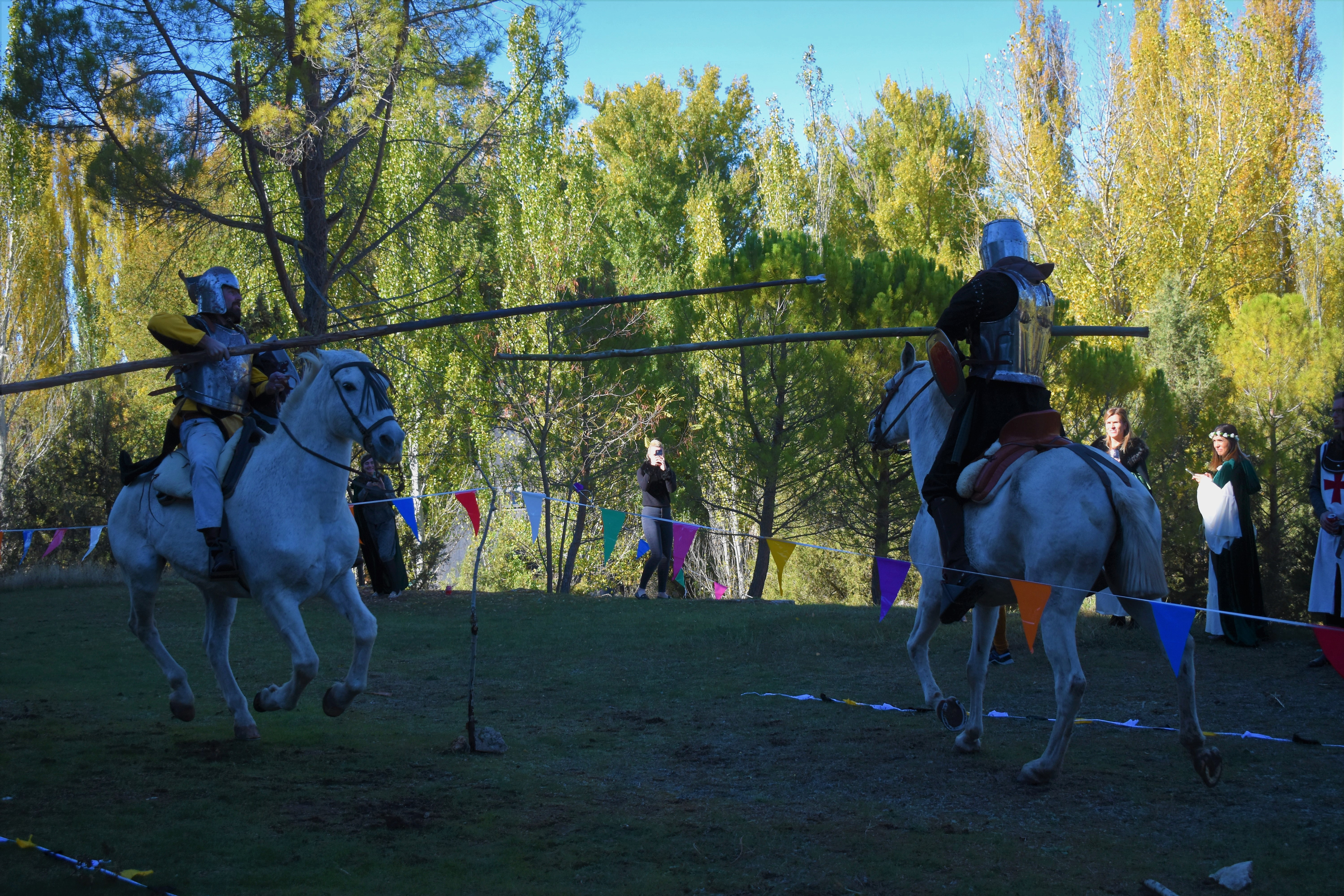
Joust at Castilnovo

== Sources ==
- The information in this article is based on that in its Spanish equivalent.
