= Adrián Vázquez =

Adrián Vázquez may refer to:

- Adrián Vázquez (footballer) (born 2004), Spanish footballer
- Adrián Vázquez Lázara (born 1982), Spanish politician
