= Velasco =

- Coat of arms
- Language: Basque, Spanish

Origin
- Meaning: patronymic of Vela
- Region of origin: Basque Country, Spain

Other names
- Variant forms: Vasco, Vasquez, Velásquez

Velasco (also Belasco or Belasko) is a Basque family name. According to the academy of Basque language, it is derived from the Visigothic name 'Vela' (Vigila) and the Basque suffix –sco. The name also made its way into Portuguese as Vasco.

Notable people with the surname include:

- The Castilian noble house of Velasco, rulers of the Dukedom of Frías
- Velasco Sánchez (fl. 1153–1181), Iberian nobleman who held various political and military offices
- Alberto Contador Velasco (born 1982), Spanish professional road bicycle racer
- Álvaro Velasco (golfer) (born 1981), Spanish professional golfer
- Álvaro Velasco (weightlifter) (born 1971), Colombian weightlifter
- Ana de Velasco y Girón (1585–1607), mother of John IV of Portugal
- Andrés Velasco (born 1961), Chilean economist and former Finance Minister
- Camile Velasco (born 1985), Filipino–American singer
- Concha Velasco (1939–2023), Spanish actress
- Cris Velasco (born 1980), American film and video game composer
- Diablo Velasco (1919–1999), Mexican trainer of professional wrestlers
- Diego López de Zúñiga y Velasco (1510–1564), sixth viceroy of Peru
- Domingo Antonio Velasco, 18th–century Italian painter
- Eleanor Thornton (Eleanor Velasco Thornton; 1880–1915), model for the Rolls–Royce hood ornament, Spirit of Ecstasy
- Epimaco Velasco (1935–2014), Filipino politician
- Félix Díaz Velasco (1868–1945), Mexican politician and general
- Flavio Romero de Velasco (1925–2016), Mexican politician and lawyer
- Gabriela Velasco (1941–2019), Chilean actress and television presenter
- Gaspar de Borja y Velasco (1580–1645), Spanish Cardinal, metropolitan of Toledo
- Iván Velasco (born 1980), Spanish road bicycle racer
- Jaime Castillo Velasco (1914–2003), Chilean politician
- José Manso de Velasco, 1st Count of Superunda (1688–1767), Governor of Chile and Viceroy of Peru
- José María Velasco Gómez (1840–1912), Mexican painter
- José María Velasco Ibarra (1893–1979), Ecuadorian president, five times elected by popular vote
- José María Cervantes y Velasco (c. 1785–1856), Mexican army officer
- José Miguel de Velasco (1795–1859), Bolivian president
- Jose R. Velasco (1916–2007), Filipino plant physiologist and agricultural chemist
- Juan Pablo Velasco, Bolivian businessman
- Juan Velasco Alvarado (1910–1977), Peruvian general, ruler of Peru 1968–1975
- Juan Velasco (footballer) (Juan Velasco Damas, born 1977), Spanish footballer
- Juan de Velasco (1727–1796), Jesuit priest
- Juan Zambudio Velasco (1921–2004), Spanish football goalkeeper
- Julio Velasco (born 1952), Argentine volleyball coach
- Lord Allan Velasco (born 1977), Filipino politician, former speaker of the House of Representatives of the Philippines
- Luís de Velasco (1511–1564), Spanish nobleman, Viceroy of New Spain
- Luis de Velasco, 1st Marquess of Salinas del Río Pisuerga (c. 1534–1617), Spanish nobleman, Viceroy of New Spain and of Peru
- Luis de Velasco y Velasco, 2nd Count of Salazar (1559–1625), Spanish nobleman, commander in the Eighty Years' War
- Luis Vicente de Velasco (1711–1762), commander in the Royal Spanish Navy
- Manuel de Velasco y Tejada, Spanish admiral at the Battle of Vigo Bay (1702)
- Manuela Velasco (born 1975), Spanish film actress
- María Elena Velasco (1940–2015), Mexican actress and film director
- Miguel Alemán Velasco (born 1932), Mexican politician, businessman and philanthropist
- Myrna Velasco (born 1988), American actress
- Omar Apolonio Velasco (born 1997), American singer-songwriter who performs as Omar Apollo
- Onyok Velasco (Mansueto Velasco Jr., born 1974), Filipino Olympic silver medalist in boxing
- Pedro Donoso Velasco (1944–2001), Chilean chess master
- Presbitero Velasco Jr. (born 1948), former Associate Justice of the Supreme Court of the Philippines
- Roel Velasco (born 1972), retired Filipino boxer
- Tomás de Torrejón y Velasco (1644–1728), Spanish composer based in Peru
- Verónica Ruiz de Velasco (born 1968), Mexican painter
- Vicente Manuel de Céspedes y Velasco (died 1794), Spanish governor of Santiago de Cuba and of West Florida
