= Guillermo Vázquez =

Guillermo Vázquez or Vásquez may refer to:

- Guillermo Vásquez (politician) (born 1942), Chilean politician
- Guillermo Vázquez Consuegra (born 1945), Spanish architect
- Guillermo Vasquez (1953–1996), American gay rights, AIDS, and Latino community activist, namesake of Guillermo Vasquez Corner
- Guillermo Vázquez (footballer) (born 1967), Mexican footballer and manager
- Guillermo Vázquez (chess player) (born 1997), Paraguayan chess player
