= Vasco =

Vasco may refer to:

== People ==
=== Given name ===
==== Middle Ages ====
- Vasco da Gama (c. 1460s–1524), Portuguese explorer
- Vasco Núñez de Balboa (1475–1519), Spanish conquistador
- Vasco Fernandes Coutinho, captain of Espírito Santo (1490–1561), Portuguese nobleman and first donatary of the Captaincy of Espírito Santo
- Vasco Fernandes (artist) (1475–1540), Portuguese painter
- Vasco de Quiroga (1470/78–1565), Spanish bishop and judge, first bishop of Michoacán, Mexico
- Vasco Martins de Sousa (1320s–1387), Lord of Mortágua and Chancellor mor under King Peter I of Portugal

==== Modern world ====
- Vasco Cordeiro (born 1973), Portuguese politician
- Vasco da Gama Fernandes (1908–1991), Portuguese politician, Chairman of the Portuguese Parliament
- Vasco Fernandes (footballer) (born 1986), Portuguese footballer
- Vasco Gonçalves, Portuguese army officer and Prime Minister of Portugal from 1974 to 1975
- Vasco Lopes (born 1999), Portuguese footballer
- Vasco Modena (1929–2016), Italian racing cyclist
- Vasco Oliveira (footballer, born 1922), Portuguese deceased footballer
- Vasco Oliveira (footballer, born 2000), Portuguese footballer
- Vasco Palmeirim (born 1979), Portuguese radio and television presenter
- Vasco Pratolini (1913–1991), Italian writer
- Vasco Rossi (born 1952), Italian singer-songwriter
- Vasco Santana (1898–1958), Portuguese actor
- Vasco Sousa (footballer) (born 2003), Portuguese footballer
- Vasco Joaquim Rocha Vieira (1939–2025), last Portuguese governor (1991–1999) of Macau

=== Surname ===
- André Vasco (born 1984), Brazilian actor and television presenter
- Giambattista Vasco (1733–1796), Italian economist and abbot
- María Vasco (born 1975), Spanish race walker
- Maurizio Vasco (born 1955), American television presenter

=== Nickname or stage name ===
- Vassil Evtimov (born 1977), French-Bulgarian former professional basketball player and head coach nicknamed "Vasco"
- Bill Stax, South Korean rapper Shin Dong-yeol (born 1980), former stage name Vasco

== Sports clubs ==
- CR Vasco da Gama, Rio de Janeiro, Brazil, a sports club also known simply as Vasco
- Vasco da Gama F.C., Cape Town, South Africa, a sports club with roots in the Rio Club, CR Vasco.
- Vasco Esporte Clube, Sergipe, Brazil, a football club
- Vasco SC, Goa, India, a sports club

== Other uses ==
- Basque language, called vasco in Spanish
- Vasco da Gama, Goa, a city in India, often called simply Vasco
- Vasco Road, California, United States
- Vasco (album), a two-part EP by Ricardo Villalobos
- Jane Vasco, the lead character in the Painkiller Jane TV series
- × Vascostylis or Vasco, an orchid genus
- Vasco Data Security International, a corporate security firm now known as OneSpan
- Vietnam Air Services Company, a regional airline in southern Vietnam, a subsidiary of Vietnam Airlines
- Vanishing and Appearing Sources during a Century of Observations project, an astronomy research project

== See also ==
- Vasco da Gama (disambiguation)
- Vasko (disambiguation)
