= Vázquez Sounds =

Mexican musical trio

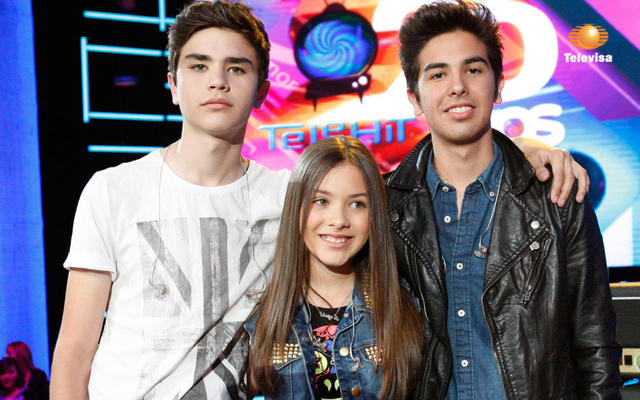
- Vázquez Sounds in the TeleHit program "México Suena" (May 2013); From left to right: Gustavo, Angie, Abelardo.

Background information
- Origin: Mexicali, Baja California, Mexico
- Genres: Pop, rock
- Years active: 2011–present
- Label: Independent via ONErpm
- Members: Angela Vázquez (age 25); Gustavo Vázquez (age 28); Abelardo Vázquez (age 30)
- Website: www.vazquezsounds.com

Vázquez Sounds, also known as V-Sounds, is a Mexican musical trio formed by siblings Abelardo "Abe", Gustavo "Gus" and Angela "Angie" Vázquez originating from the city of Mexicali, Baja California, in Mexico. They are known for their cover of the Adele song "Rolling in the Deep", which received over 260 million YouTube hits, becoming an instant internet sensation, and even earning them air time on Spanish-language television, CNN en Español, VH1 and Good Morning America.

== Career ==
Abe, Gus and Angie Vázquez are children of music producer Abelardo Vázquez, who has worked with groups like Mexican bands Reik, Nikki Clan and Camila. Vázquez Sounds uses their own recording studio to record and edit their music.

Vázquez Sounds released their cover of Adele's "Rolling in the Deep" on November 10, 2011, on YouTube. The single peaked at number one on the Mexican Top 100 Chart, and was certified platinum by the AMPROFON. They released their second single, a rendition of "All I Want for Christmas Is You", which peaked number two on the top 10, following their version of "Rolling in the Deep" at number one.

In September 2014, Vazquez Sounds released their first album containing original songs, which was an instant hit and earned them a nomination at the 2015 Latin Grammy for Best New Artist. Currently, Vazquez Sounds remain as independent artists.

== Band members ==
The trio forms a full band with the following recording arrangement:

- Abe Vázquez – guitar, bass, piano, harmonica, accordion, ukulele, keyboard, vocals, percussion, drums

Born on December 23, 1995.

- Gus Vázquez – drums, percussion, guitar, banjo, harmonica, piano

Born on May 15, 1998.

- Angie Vázquez – lead vocals, piano, harmonica, guitar, ukulele

Born on January 17, 2001.

== Albums ==
=== Studio albums ===
Year	Album	Peak chart positions
2012	Vázquez Sounds: Released: April 19, 2012; Format: CD + DVD; Label: Sony Music Latinoamérica	Mexico: 4

Year	Album	Peak chart positions
2014	Invencible: Released: September 9, 2014; Format: CD, digital download; Label: Sony Music Latinoamérica	N/A

Year	Album	Peak chart positions
2015	Sweet Christmas Ukelele & Jazz: Released: November 13, 2015; Format: CD (limited), digital download; Label: N/A	N/A

=== Compilation albums ===
Year	Album	Peak chart positions
2014	Locos por la Música: Released: July 22, 2014; Format: digital download; Label: Sony Music Latinoamérica	Mexico: 1

== Singles ==
- 2011: "Rolling In The Deep" (by Adele)
- 2011: "All I Want for Christmas Is You" (by Mariah Carey)
- 2012: "Forget You" (by Cee-Lo Green)
- 2012: "The Show" (by Lenka)
- 2012: "I Want You Back" (by The Jackson Five)
- 2012: "Let It Be" (by The Beatles)
- 2012: "Skyscraper" (by Demi Lovato)
- 2013: "Time After Time" (by Cyndi Lauper)
- 2013: "Next To Me" (by Emeli Sandé)
- 2013: "Complicated" (by Avril Lavigne)
- 2014: "Te Soñaré" (original)
- 2014: "Me Voy, Me Voy" (original)
- 2014: "En Mi, No en Ti" (original)
- 2015: "Riptide" (by Vance Joy)
- 2015: "Buenos Días, Señor Sol" (by Juan Gabriel)
- 2016: "Dreams" (by Fleetwood Mac)
- 2017: "Te Encontré" (original)
- 2017: "Julio" (original)
- 2018: "Volverte a Ver" (original)
- 2018: "Eco" (Cover)
- 2019: "Phoenix" (original)

== Other songs ==
- 2012: "Gracias a ti" (Teleton anthem) (original)
- 2012: "La Separación" (Tinkerbell)
- 2013: "Blowin' In The Wind" (By Bob Dylan, covered for the ONE.org campaign)
- 2013: "I Love Rock N' Roll" (By Joan Jett, 2013 back to school campaign by Coppel)
- 2014: "Best Day of My Life" (By American Authors, 2014 back to school campaign by Coppel)
- 2015: "Buenos Días, Señor Sol" (By Juan Gabriel, covered for a Jumex campaign)
- 2016: "Blinded" (By DJ Noah featuring Angela Vázquez)
- 2016: "Over and Over Again" (By Nathan Skyes featuring Ariana Grande, cover featuring Leroy Sanchez)

== Videography ==
- 2011: Rolling in the Deep (cover)
- 2011: All I Want For Christmas Is You (cover)
- 2012: Forget You (cover)
- 2012: The Show (cover)
- 2012: I Want You Back (cover)
- 2012: Let It Be (cover)
- 2012: Skyscraper (cover)
- 2013: Time After Time (cover)
- 2013: Next To Me (cover)
- 2013: Complicated (cover)
- 2014: Te Soñaré (original)
- 2014: Me voy, Me voy (original)
- 2014: En mí, no en ti (original)
- 2015: Riptide (cover)
- 2016: Over & Over Again (ft. Leroy Sanchez) (cover)
- 2017: Hallelujah (cover)
- 2017: Location (cover)
- 2019: Shallow (cover)
- 2019: Phoenix (original)
