= Condado de Castilnovo =

- Municipality
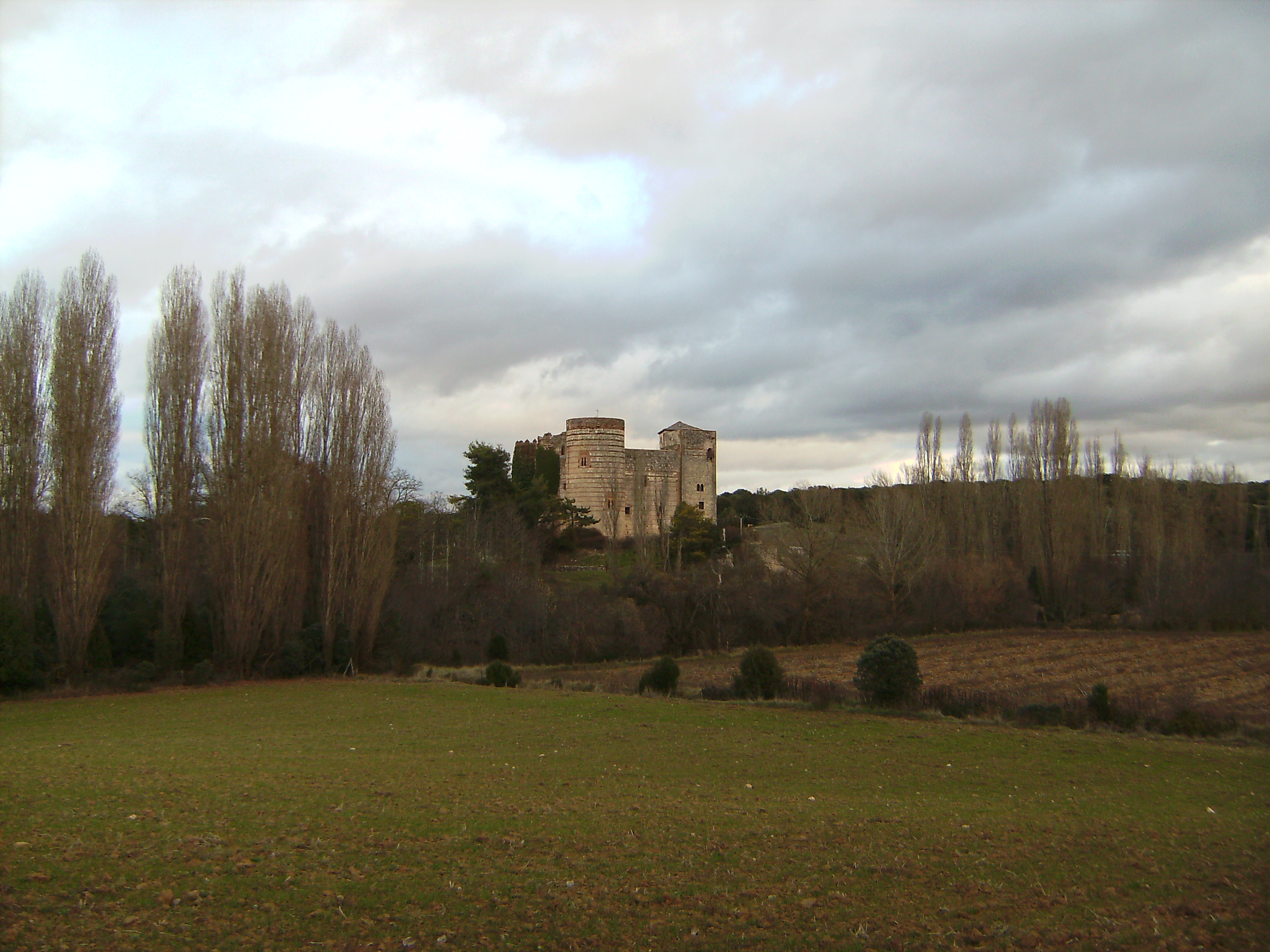

- Location in Spain. Condado de Castilnovo (Spain)
- Coordinates: 41°14′17″N 3°44′30″W
- Country: Spain
- Autonomous community: Castile and León
- Province: Segovia
- Municipality: Condado de Castilnovo

Area
  - Total: 23.85 km^{2} (9.21 sq mi)
- Elevation: 997 m (3,271 ft)

Population (2025-01-01)
  - Total: 74
  - Density: 3.1/km^{2} (8.0/sq mi)
- Time zone: UTC+1 (CET)
  - Summer (DST): UTC+2 (CEST)
- Website: Official website

Condado de Castilnovo is a municipality located in the province of Segovia, Castile and León, Spain. According to the 2004 census (INE), the municipality has a population of 128 inhabitants.

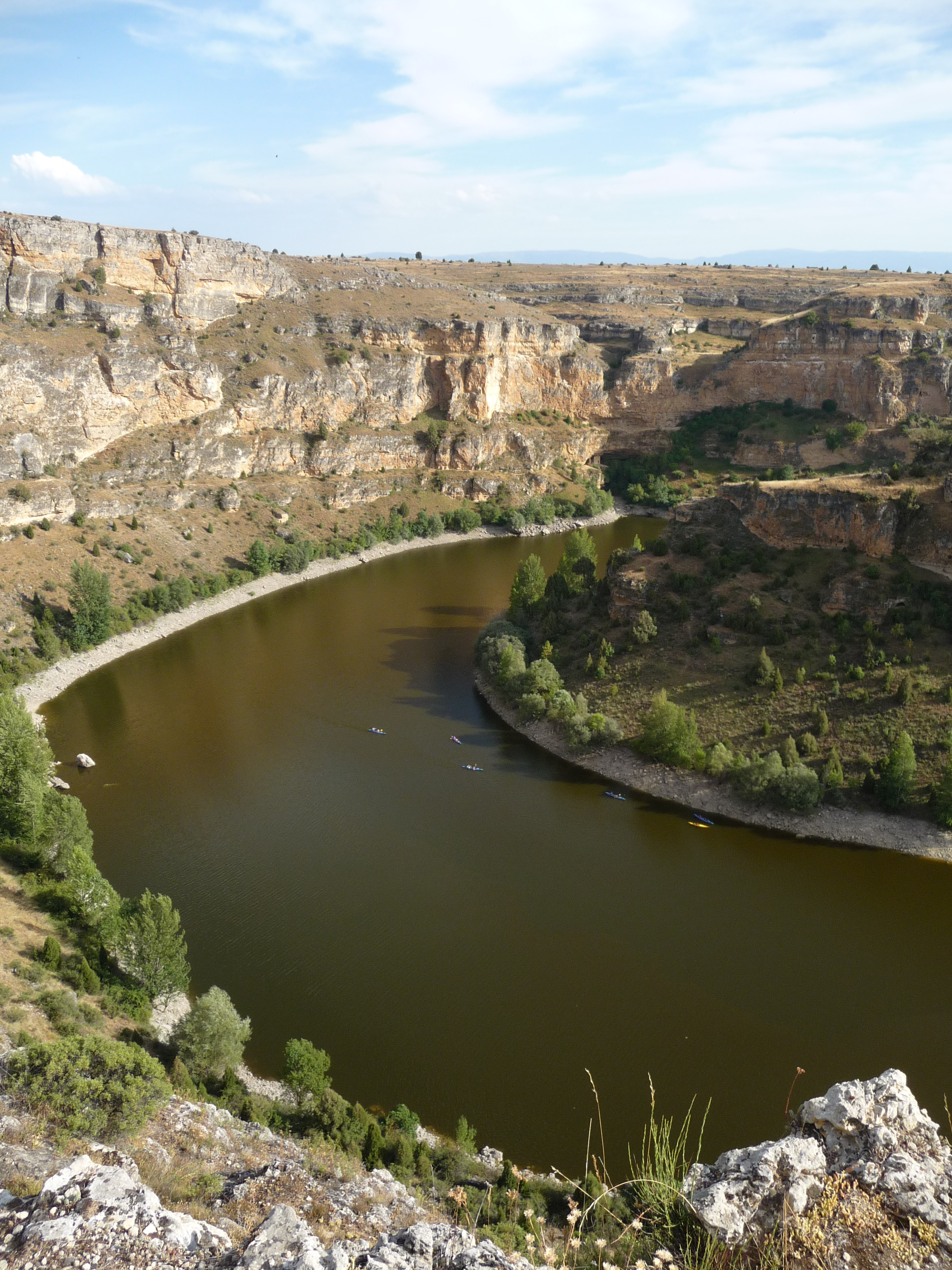
View of the Duratón river ´s canyon.

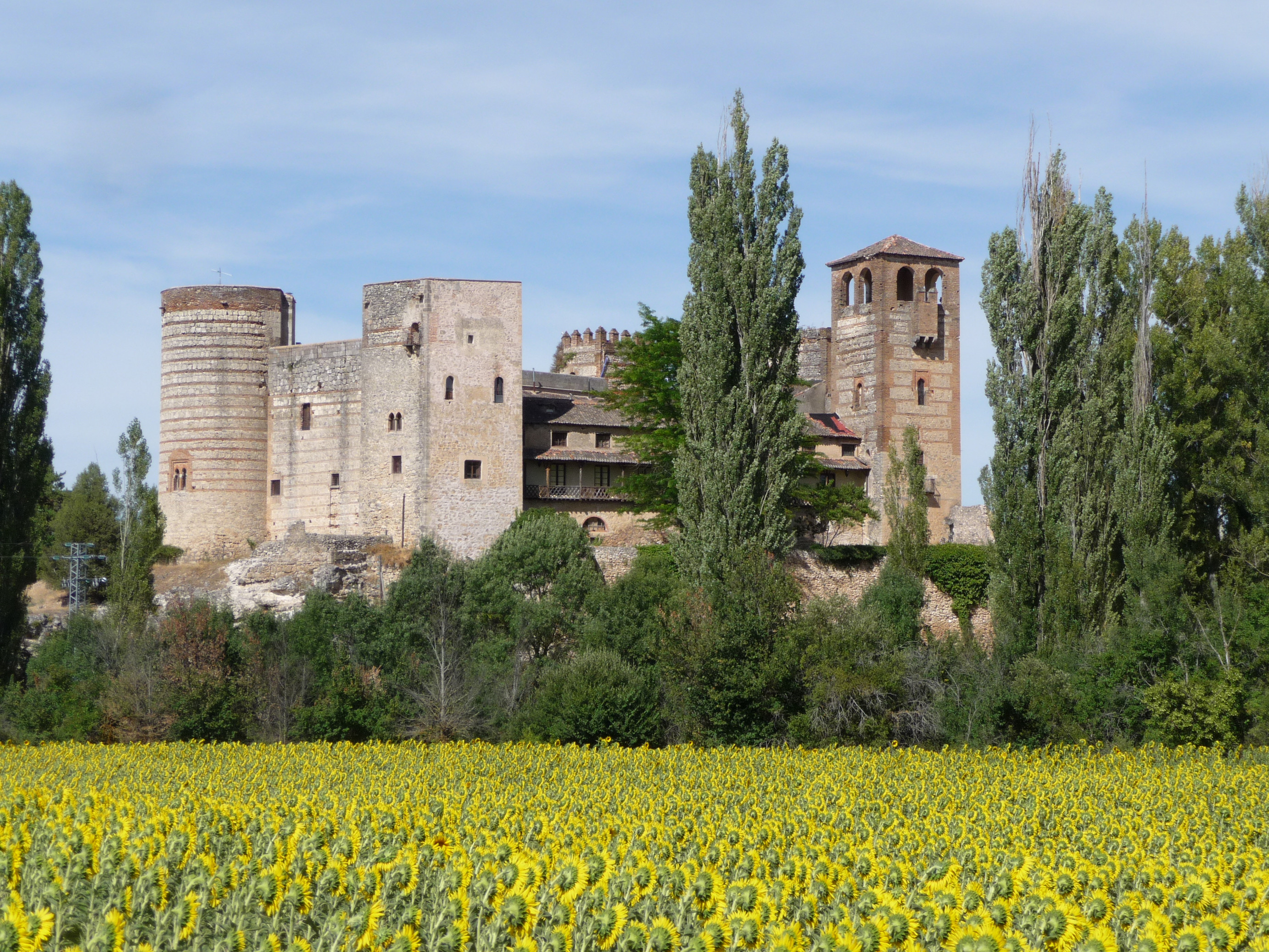
Castle of Castilnovo.
