= Rhynchostylis rieferi =

Scientific classification
- Kingdom: Plantae
- Clade: Tracheophytes
- Clade: Angiosperms
- Clade: Monocots
- Order: Asparagales
- Family: Orchidaceae
- Subfamily: Epidendroideae
- Genus: Rhynchostylis
- Species: R. rieferi

Binomial name
- Rhynchostylis rieferi W.E.Higgins

Species of orchid

Rhynchostylis rieferi is a species of orchid endemic to the Philippines. Its morphology is very similar to Rhynchostylis retusa, however the flowers are smaller and the leaf tip forms an acute spike. The species was discovered from a cultivated plant in the United States of America.
