= Te Soñaré =

"Te soñaré"

Single by Vázquez Sounds

from the album Invencible
- Released: March 11, 2014
- Recorded: 2014
- Genre: Pop
- Length: 2:42
- Label: Sony Music Entrenmient Mexico
- Songwriter(s): Abelardo Vazquez; Alberto Espinoza; Gustavo Vazquez
- Producer(s): Abelardo Vazquez

Vázquez Sounds singles chronology
| "Complicated" (2013) | "Te soñaré" (2014) | "Me Voy, Me Voy" (2014) |

Music video
- "Te Soñaré" on YouTube

"Te soñare" (English: I'll dream you) is a song by the Mexican band Vázquez Sounds that premiered on March 11, 2014. Te Soñare is included in the album called "Invencible," which contains 10 songs in Spanish.

== Letter and dedication ==
Te Soñare is inspired by universal love and the great power of dreams in humans, and they seek to convey that to their fans, according to the young musicians originating in Mexicali, Baja California. Dedicated to universal love and the great power of dreams in every human being, they represent a motivation to achieve what we want to fight for our goals, to act and to conceive much higher dreams.

== Music video ==
The video was recorded in Los Angeles, under the direction of Carlos Lopez Estrada and Vazquez Sounds shows in a dream world.

== Track list ==
Te Soñaré - Single
| No. | Title | Length |
|---|---|---|
| 1. | "Te Soñaré" | 2:42 |
