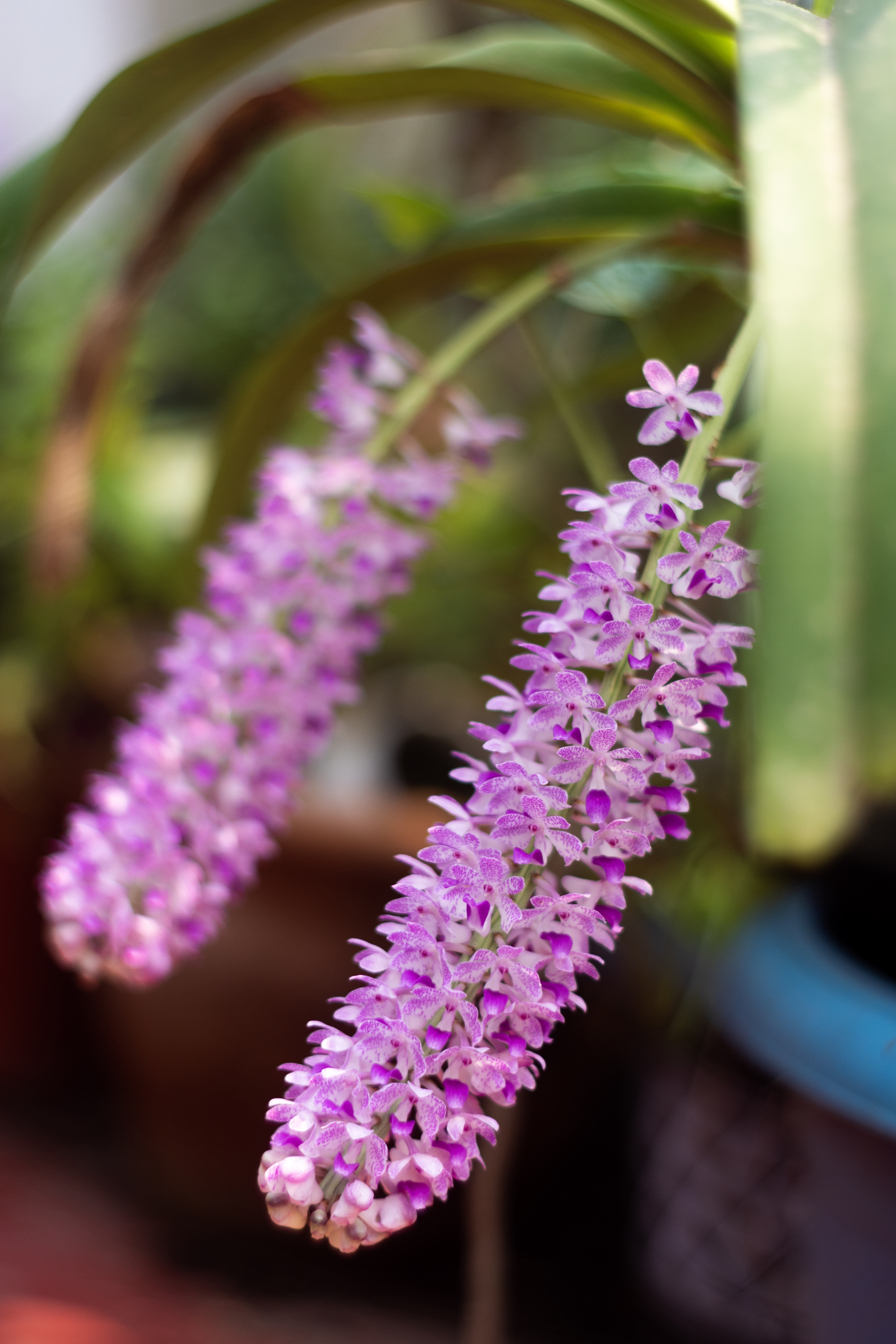

Scientific classification
- Kingdom: Plantae
- Clade: Tracheophytes
- Clade: Angiosperms
- Clade: Monocots
- Order: Asparagales
- Family: Orchidaceae
- Subfamily: Epidendroideae
- Subtribe: Aeridinae
- Genus: Rhynchostylis
- Species: R. retusa

Binomial name
- Rhynchostylis retusa (L.) Blume

Synonyms
- List: Epidendrum retusum L. (basionym); Aerides guttata (Lindl.) Roxb.; Aerides praemorsa Willd.; Aerides retusa (L.) Sw.; Aerides spicata D.Don; Aerides undulata Sm.; Anota violacea (Rchb.f.) Schltr.; Epidendrum hippium Buch.-Ham. ex D.Don; Epidendrum indicum Poir.; Gastrochilus blumei (Lindl.) Kuntze; Gastrochilus garwalicus (Lindl.) Kuntze; Gastrochilus praemorsus (Willd.) Kuntze; Gastrochilus retusus (L.) Kuntze; Gastrochilus rheedei (Wight) Kuntze; Gastrochilus spicatus (D.Don) Kuntze; Gastrochilus violaceus (Rchb.f.) Kuntze; Limodorum retusum (L.) Sw.; Orchis lanigera Blanco; Rhynchostylis albiflora I.Barua & Bora; Rhynchostylis garwalica (Lindl.) Rchb.f.; Rhynchostylis guttata (Lindl.) Rchb.f.; Rhynchostylis praemorsa (Willd.) Blume; Rhynchostylis retusa f. albiflora (I.Barua & Bora) Christenson; Rhynchostylis violacea Rchb.f.; Saccolabium blumei Lindl.; Saccolabium garwalicum Lindl.; Saccolabium guttatum (Lindl.) Lindl. ex Wall.; Saccolabium heathii auct.; Saccolabium macrostachyum Lindl.; Saccolabium praemorsum (Willd.) Lindl.; Saccolabium retusum (L.) Voigt; Saccolabium rheedei Wight; Saccolabium spicatum (D.Don) Lindl.; Saccolabium violaceum Rchb.f.; Sarcanthus guttatus Lindl.

= Rhynchostylis retusa =

Species of orchid

Rhynchostylis retusa (also called foxtail orchid) is an orchid belonging to the Vanda alliance. The inflorescence is a pendant raceme, consisting of more than 100 pink-spotted white flowers. The plant has a short, stout, creeping stem carrying up to 12, curved, fleshy, deeply channeled, keeled, retuse apically leaves and blooms on an axillary pendant to 60 cm (24 in) long, racemose, densely flowered, cylindrical inflorescence that occurs in the winter and early spring.

== Distribution ==
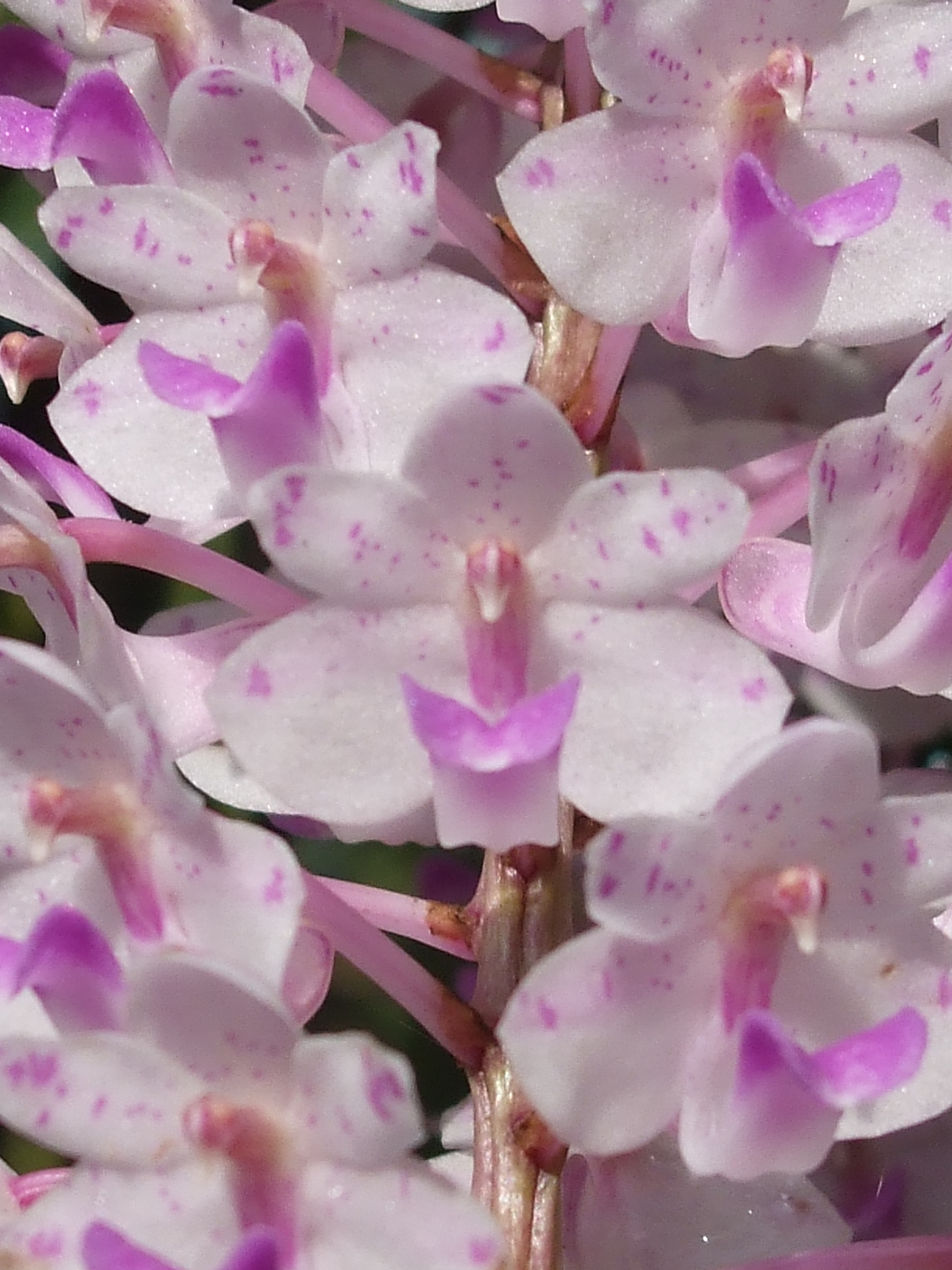
Close-up of the individual flowers forming the inflorescence of Rhynchostylis retusa

The plant is an epiphyte growing on tree trunks in open forests or at forest margins at elevations of 300–1,500 m (980–4,920 ft). It can be found in Bhutan, Cambodia, China (Guizhou, Yunnan), India, Indonesia, Laos, Malaysia, Myanmar, Nepal, Philippines, Singapore, Sri Lanka, Thailand, and Vietnam.

In India, the plant is most common in the Northeast, Odisha and Andhra Pradesh. In Andhra Pradesh, the plant is called by Telugu name Chintaranamu. Due to bio-piracy, the plant is on the verge of extinction in India. Rhynchostylis retusa is recognized as the state flower of Arunachal Pradesh and Assam in India, as well as the provincial flower of Uva Province in Sri Lanka.

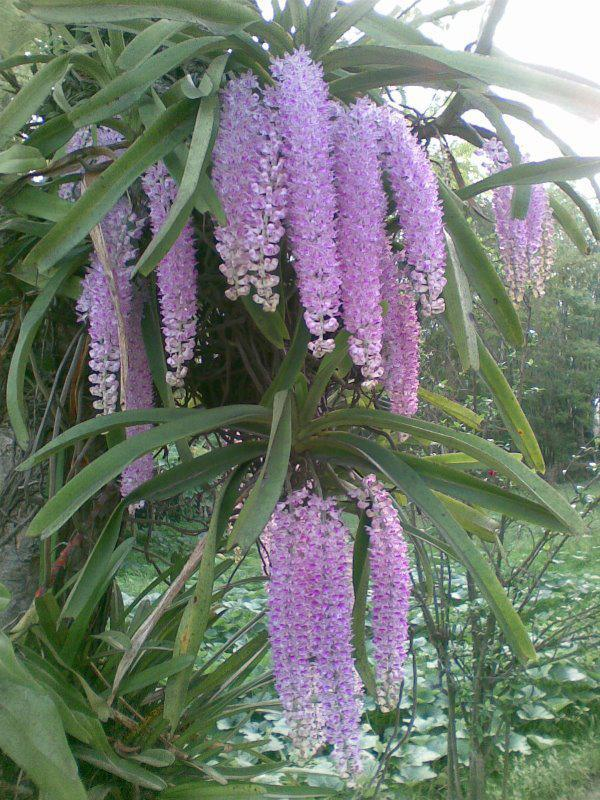
Rhynchostylis retusa, an orchid species of frequent occurrence in Assam

== Care ==
The plant requires regular watering and applications of fertilizer throughout the year, although it will die if the leaves are wet frequently. It prefers indirect light. Flowering usually occurs in late spring.

== Medicinal uses ==
In Malabar District various preparations of the plant were used against asthma and tuberculosis and for 'nervous twitchings' (referable possibly to tic disorder), cramp, epileptic spasms, vertigo, palpitations, kidney stone and menstrual disorder. The plant has also been used in Assam to treat wounds, cuts and bruises. The plant has been used as an emollient in India and Nepal. Under the name of rasna the root is used to treat rheumatism throughout the Indian subcontinent.

== Culture ==
=== India ===
The species is the state flower of Assam, where it is popularly known as kopou phool (Assamese: কপৌ ফুল), and is an integral part of a Bihu dancer's attire. The plant is considered to be a symbol of love, fertility and merriment, and is popular in Assamese wedding ceremonies. It is the also the state flower of Arunachal Pradesh.

== Gallery ==
Transformation of Rhynchostylis retusa from flower buds to seeds.

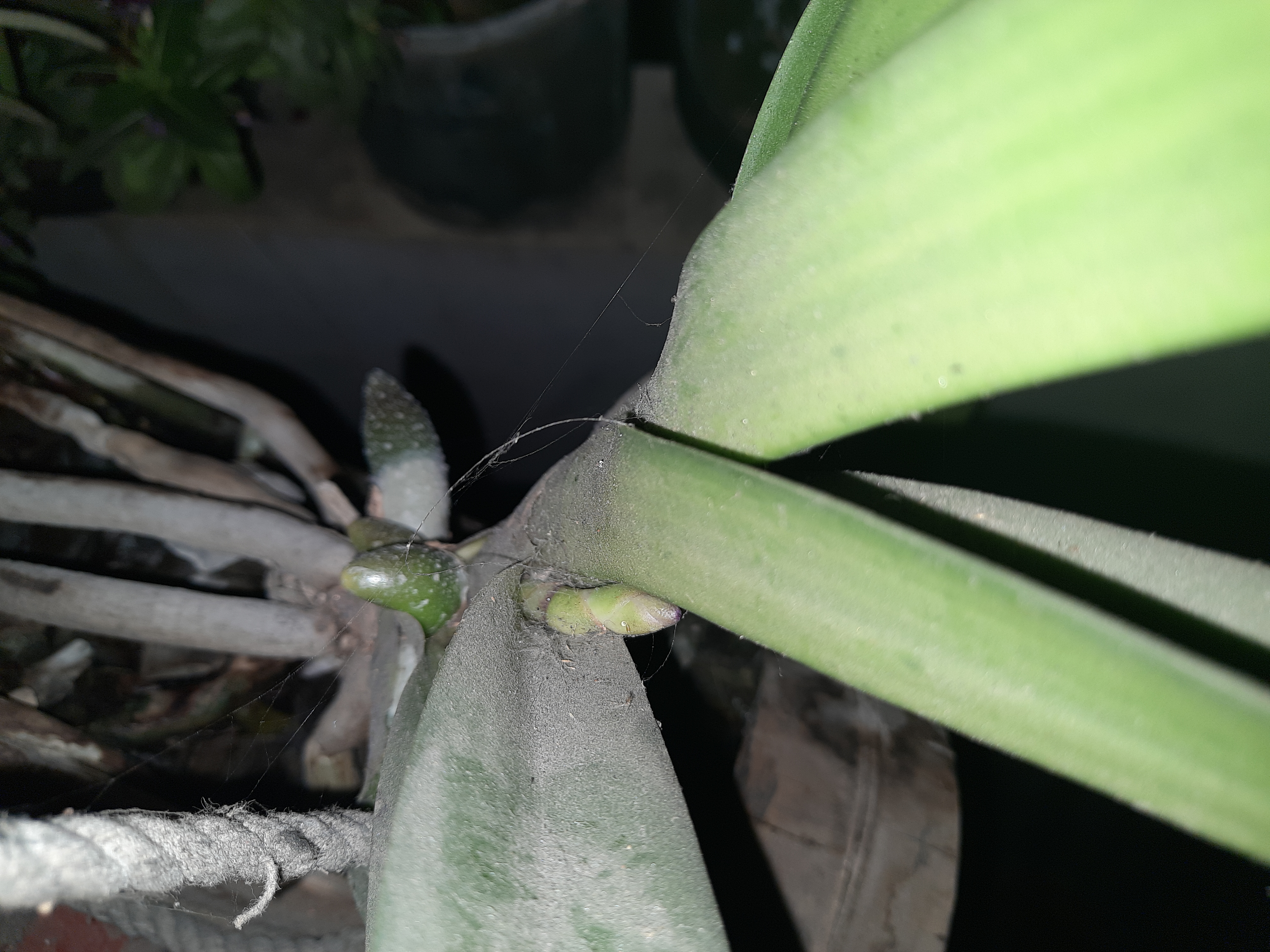
New Buds of Rhynchostylis retusa

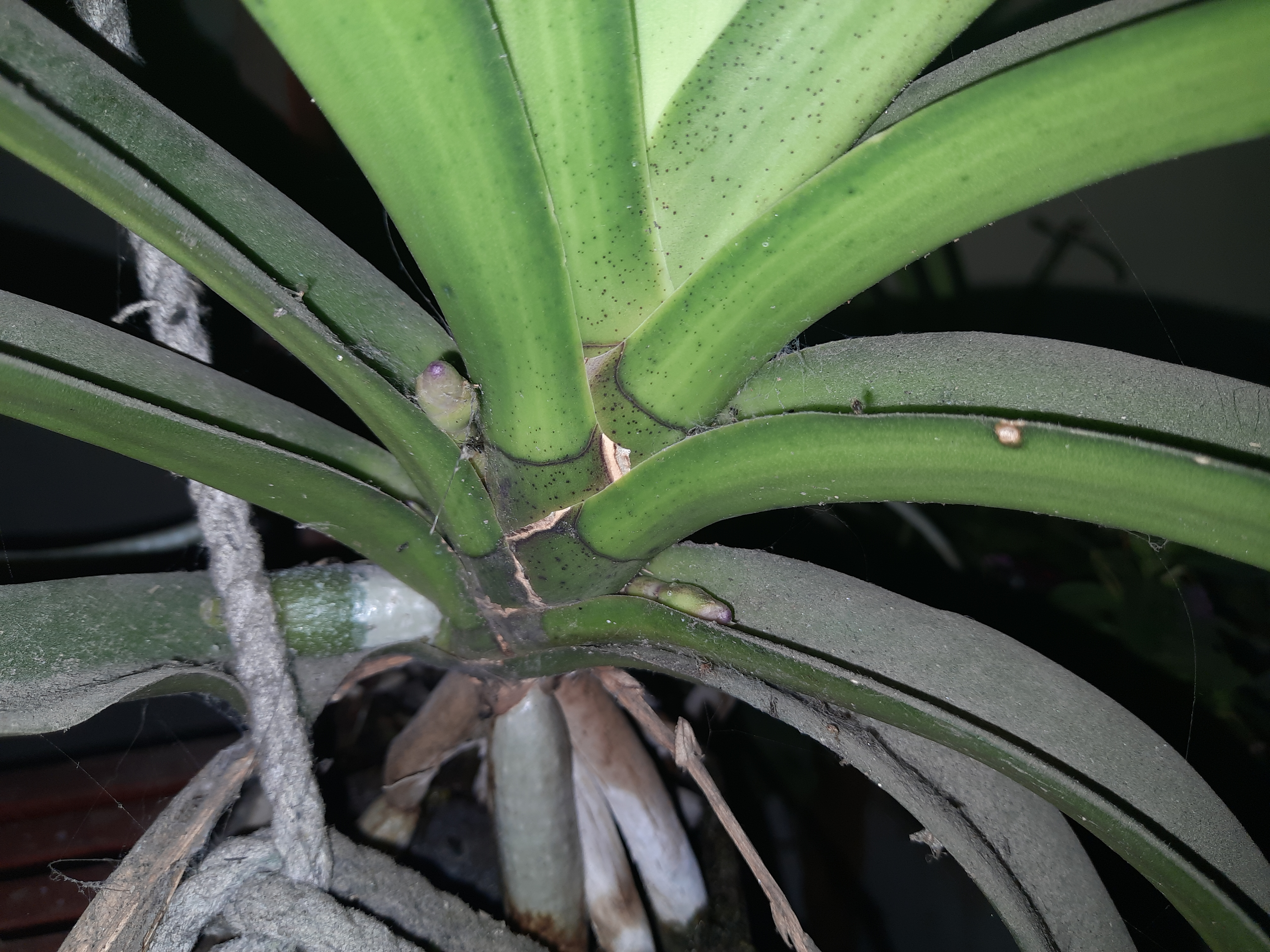
New Buds of Rhynchostylis retusa

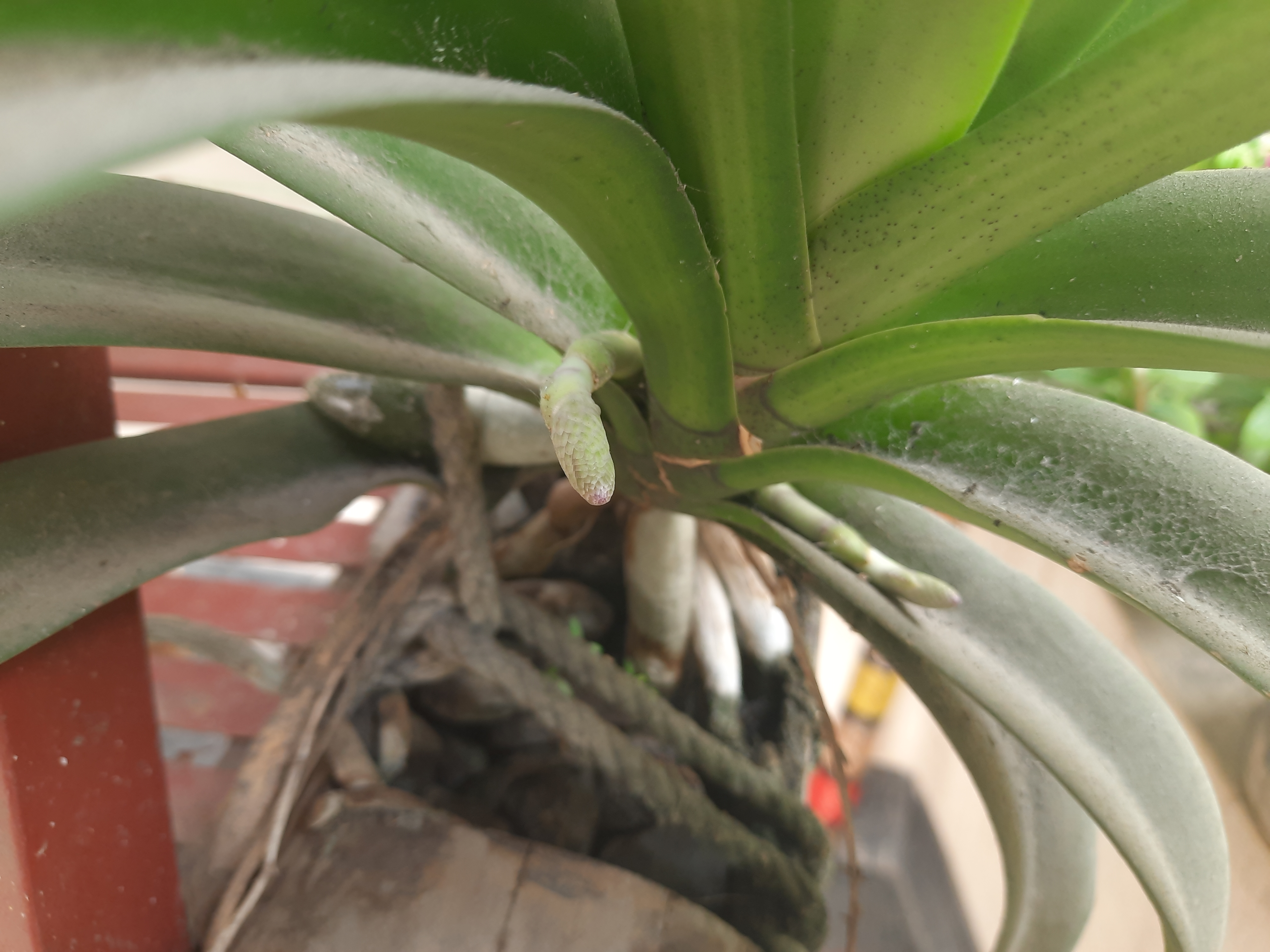
Buds of Rhynchostylis retusa

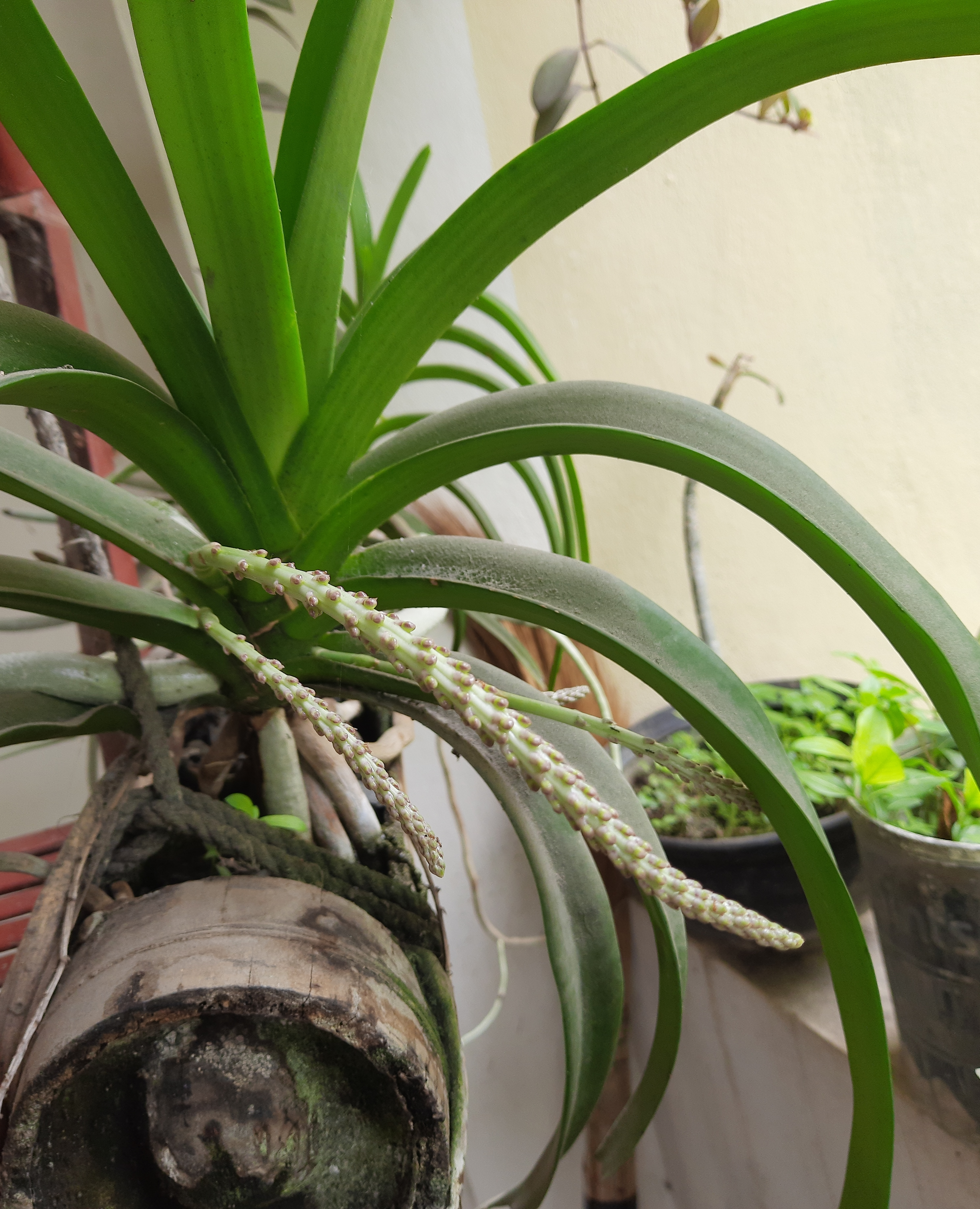
Buds of Rhynchostylis retusa

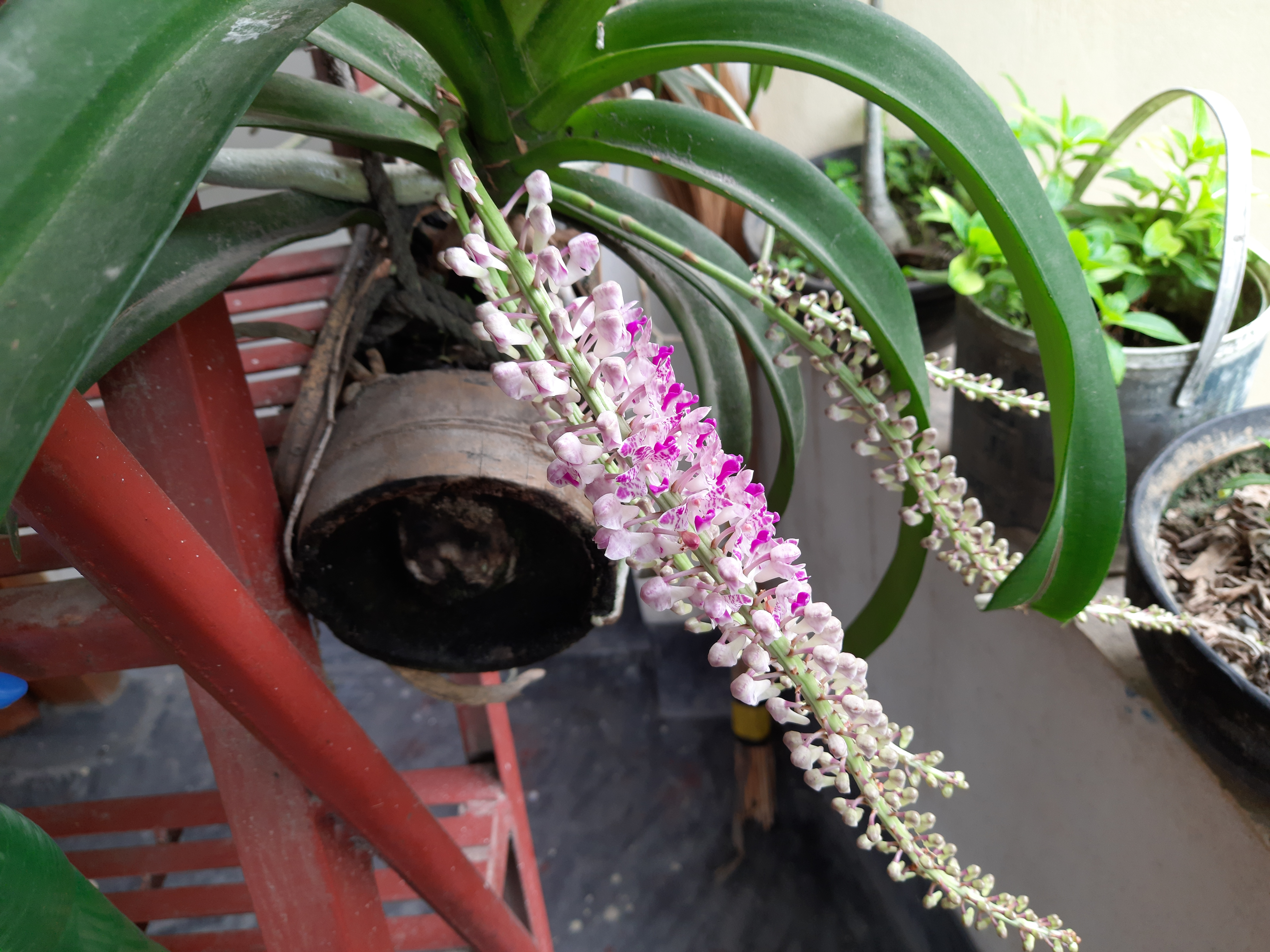
Flowers of Rhynchostylis retusa

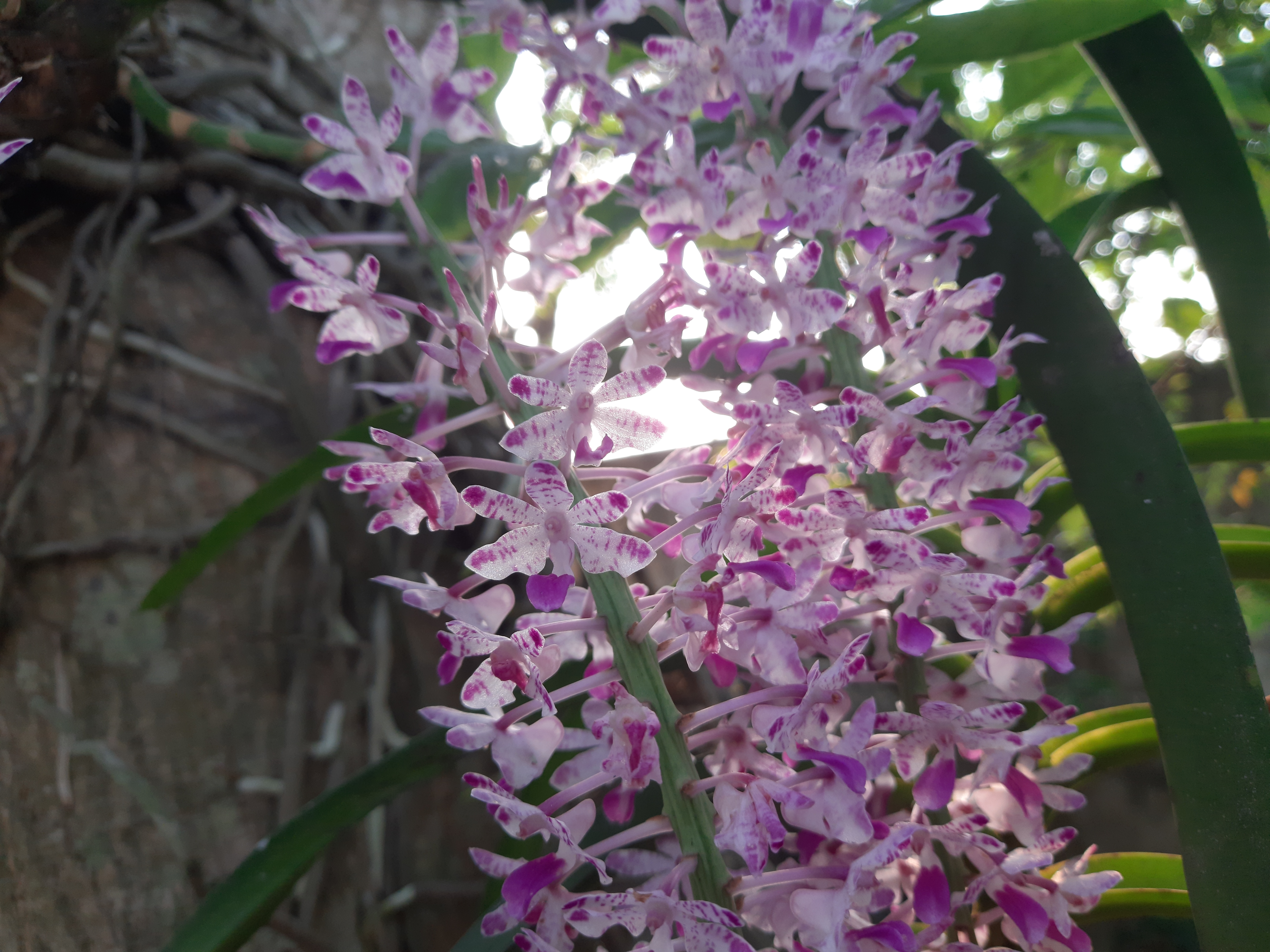
Flowers of Rhynchostylis retusa

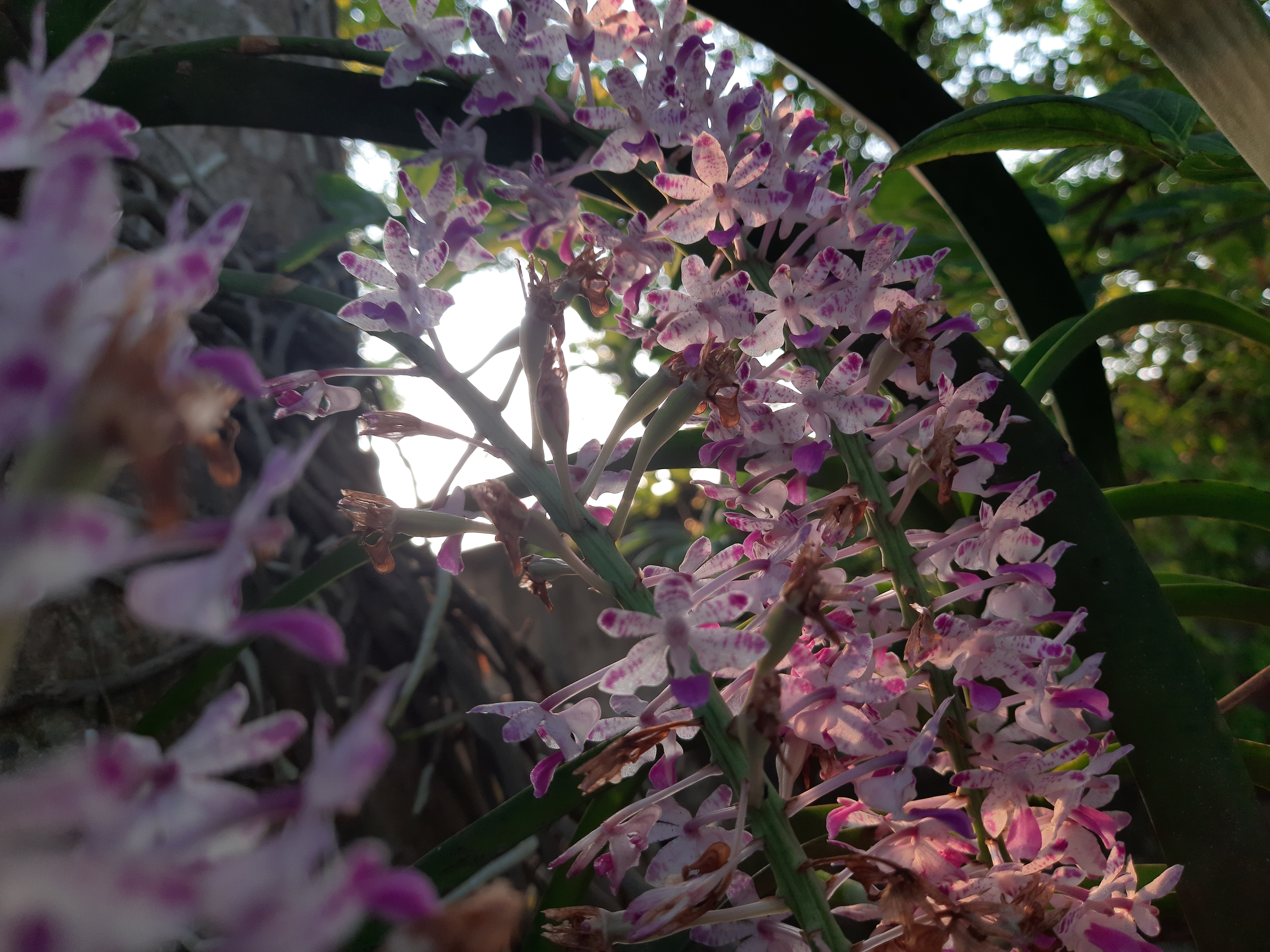
New fruits of Rhynchostylis retusa

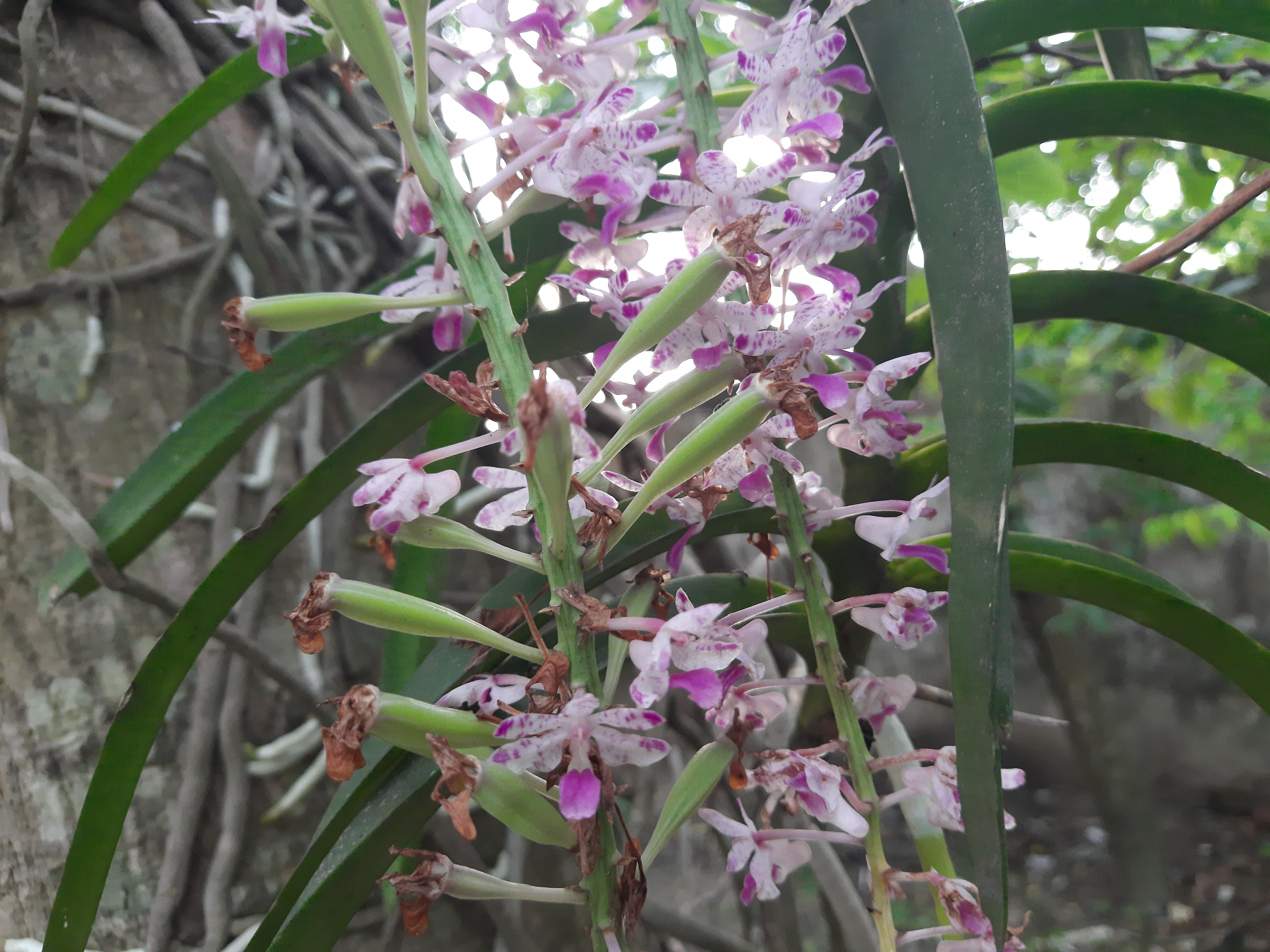
New fruits of Rhynchostylis retusa

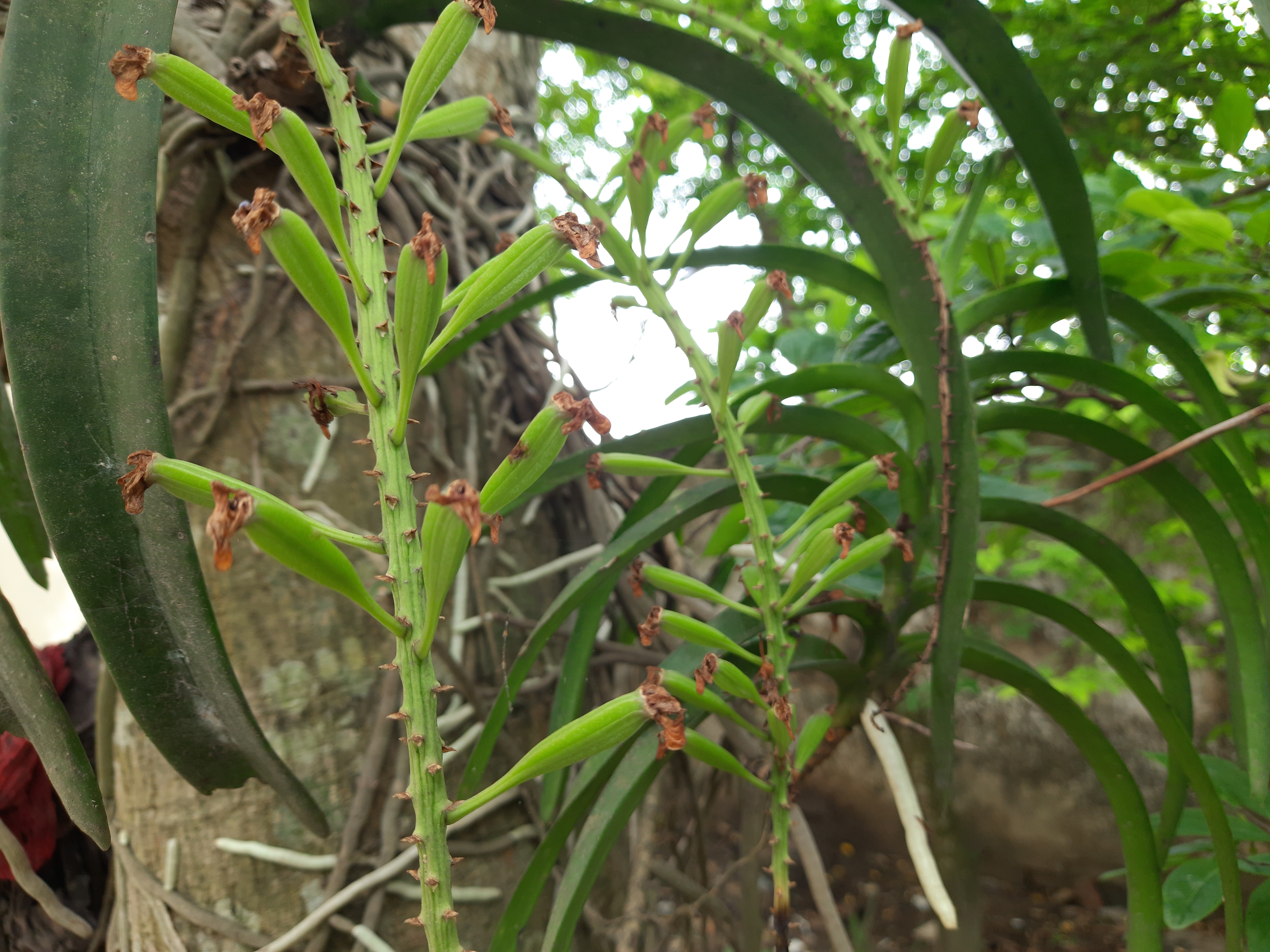
New fruits of Rhynchostylis retusa

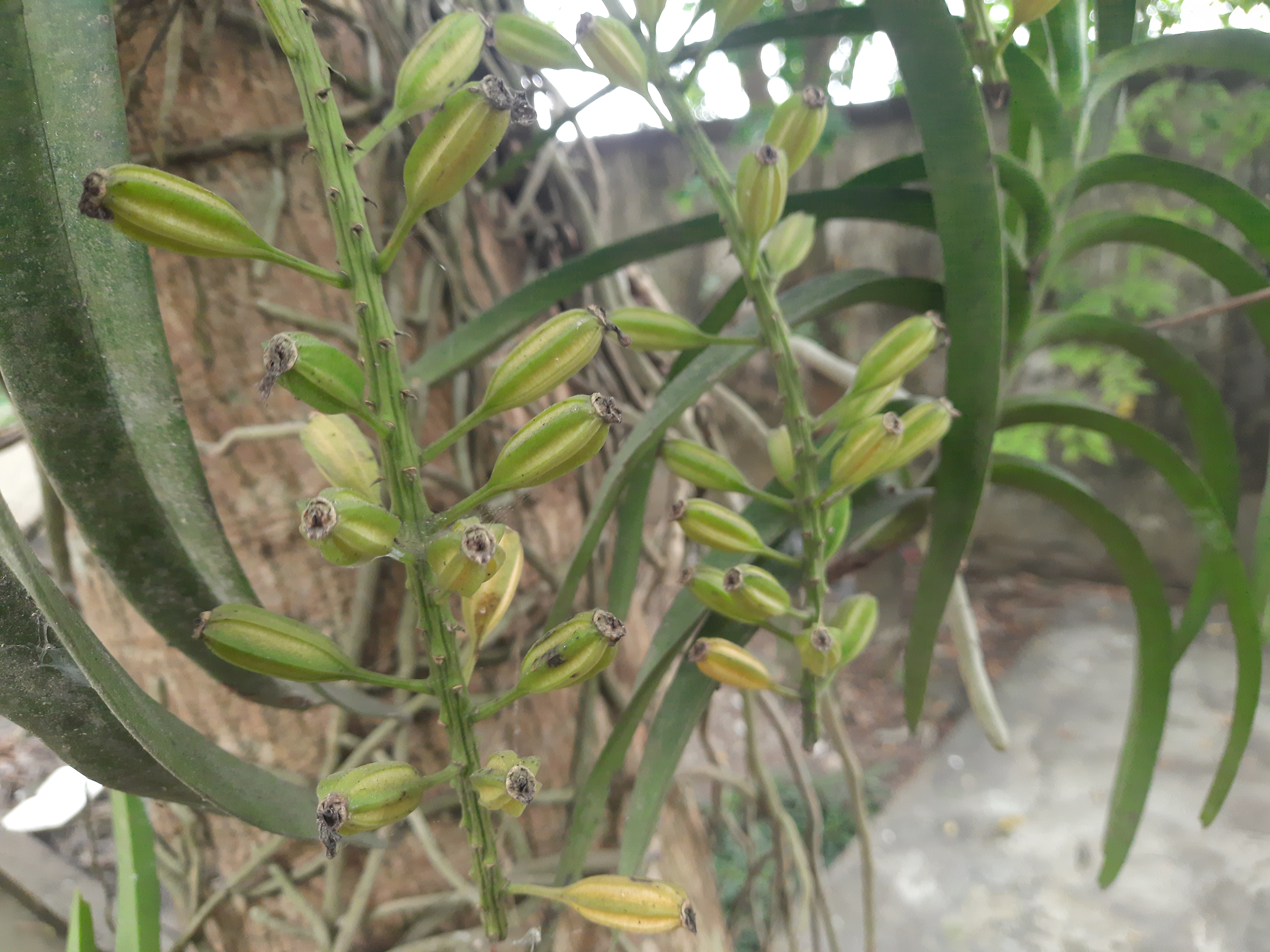
Fruits of Rhynchostylis retusa

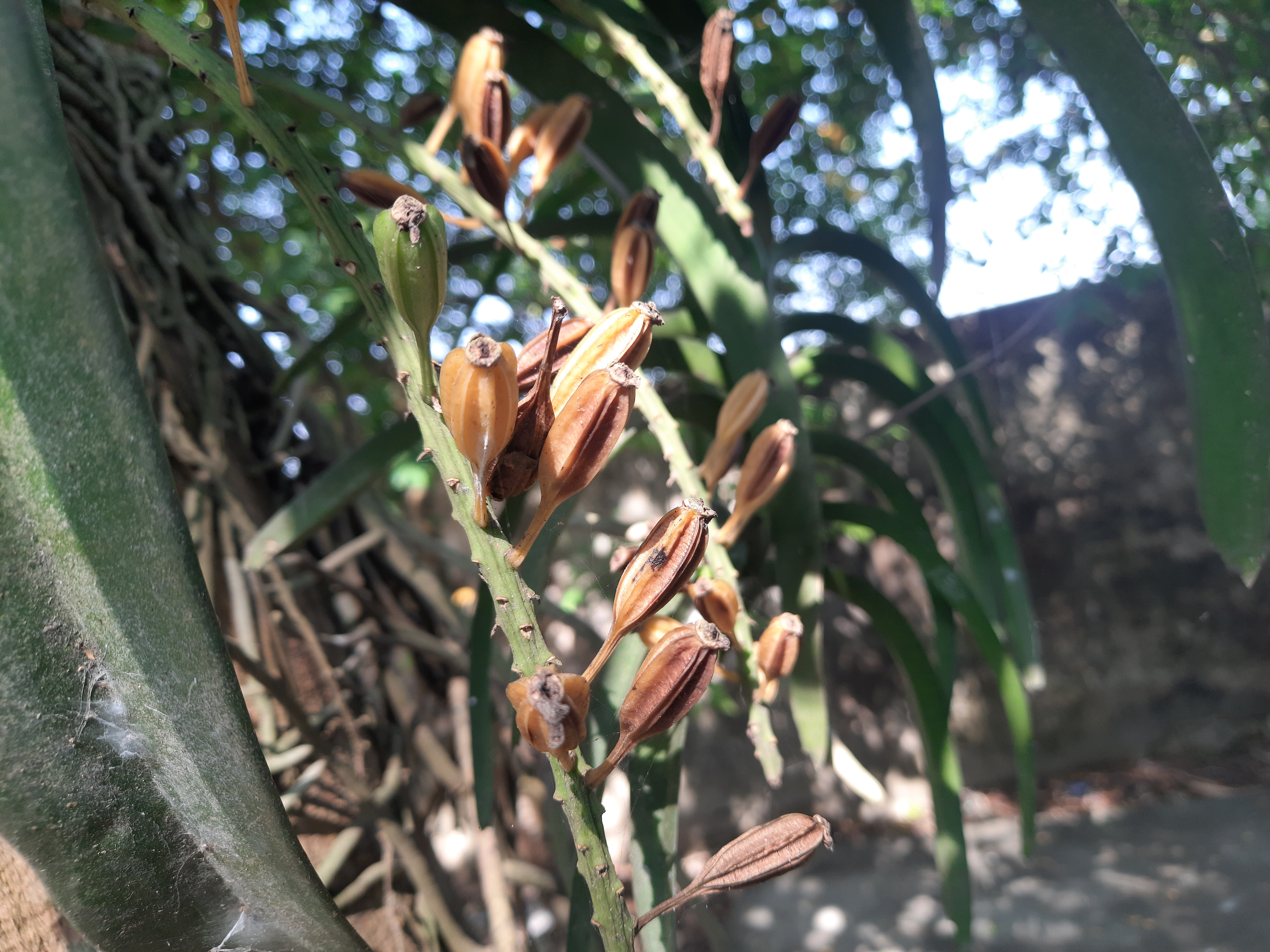
Matured fruits of Rhynchostylis retusa

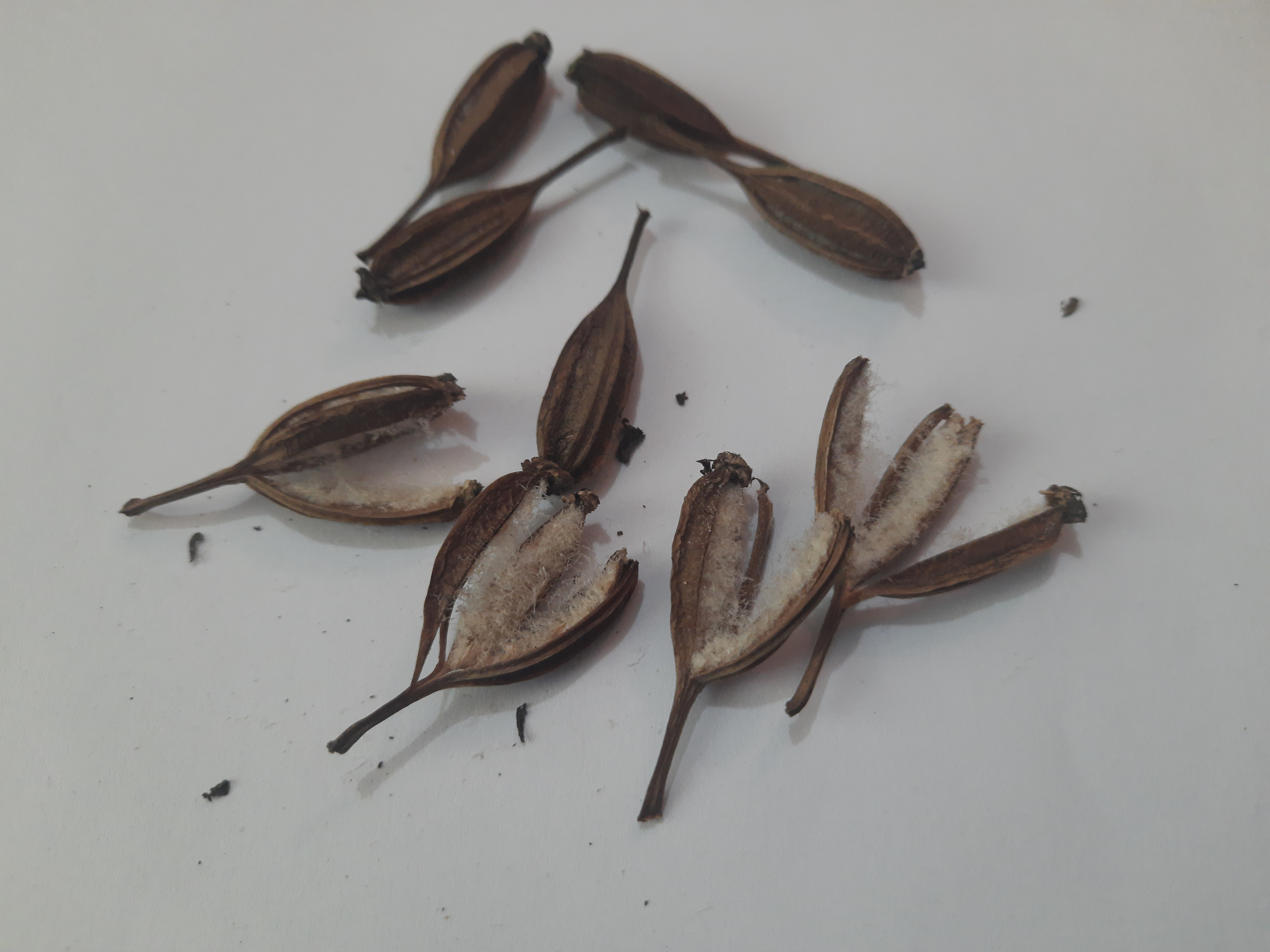
Matured fruits of Rhynchostylis retusa

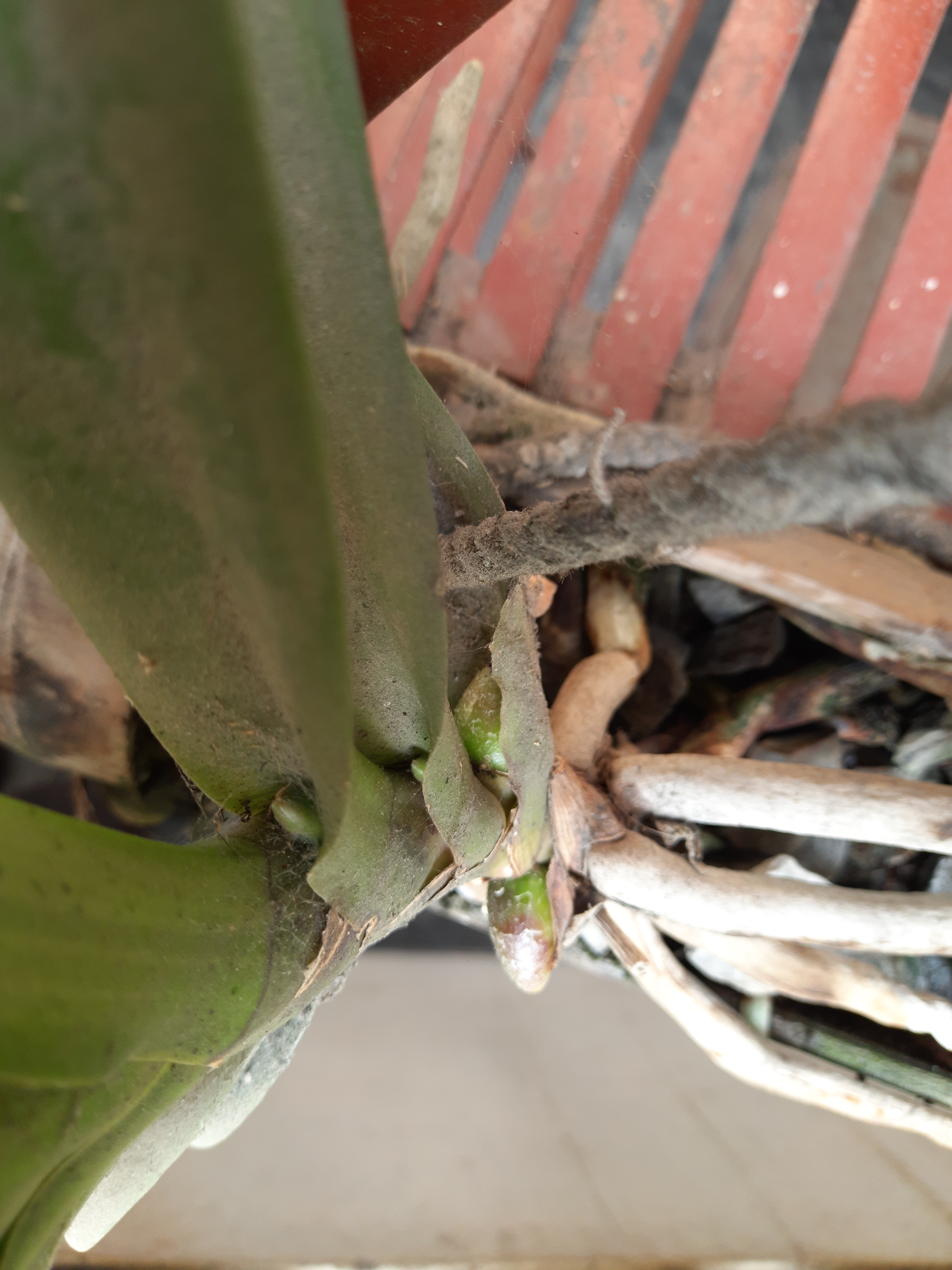
New roots of Rhynchostylis retusa

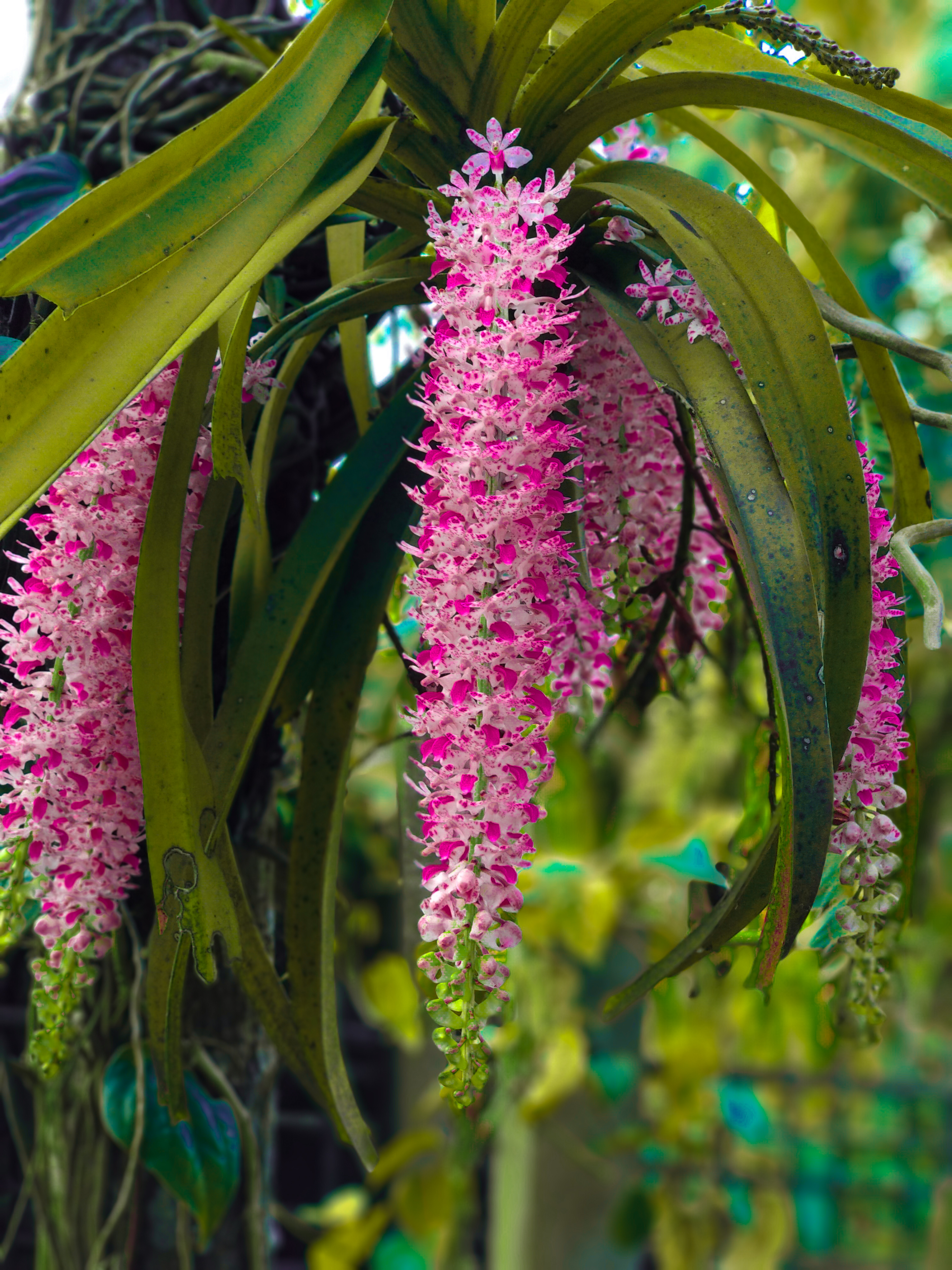
Flowers of Rhynchostylis retusa
