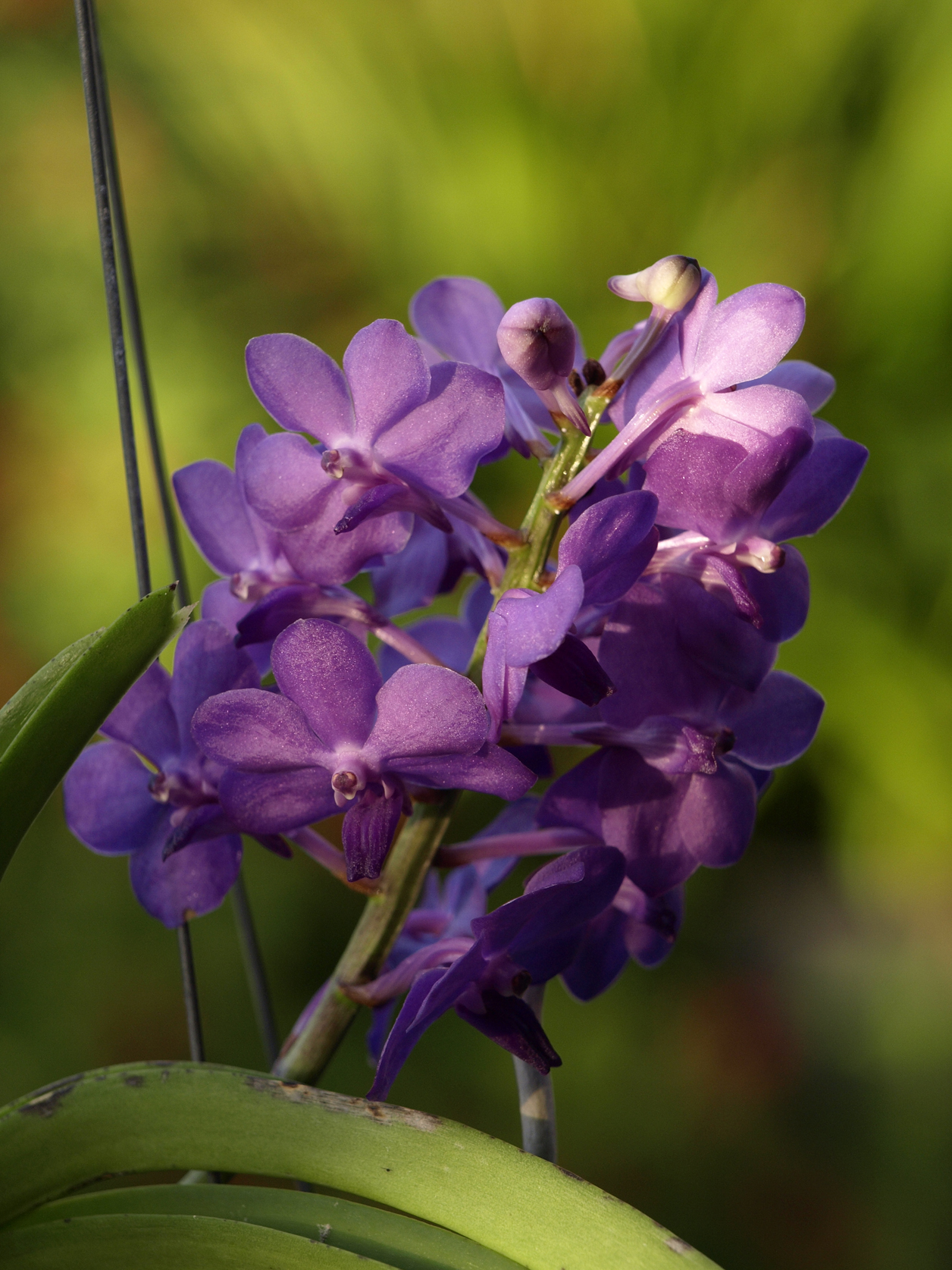
- × Vascostylis Pine Rivers

Scientific classification
- Kingdom: Plantae
- Clade: Tracheophytes
- Clade: Angiosperms
- Clade: Monocots
- Order: Asparagales
- Family: Orchidaceae
- Subfamily: Epidendroideae
- Tribe: Vandeae
- Subtribe: Aeridinae
- Genus: × Vandachostylis; Schltr.

Synonyms
- × Vascostylis

= × Vandachostylis =

Genus of orchids

× Vandachostylis, abbreviated Van. in the horticultural trade, is the nothogenus for intergeneric hybrids between the orchid genera Rhynchostylis and Vanda (Rhy. × V.). It is now the accepted name for several former hybrid genera, such as × Vascostylis and × Neostylis, since Ascocentrum and Neofinetia are now both synonymous with Vanda.

The Vandachostylis genus was created in 1922 by a German botanist Rudolf Schlechter.
