= Giambattista Vasco =

Italian economist and abbot

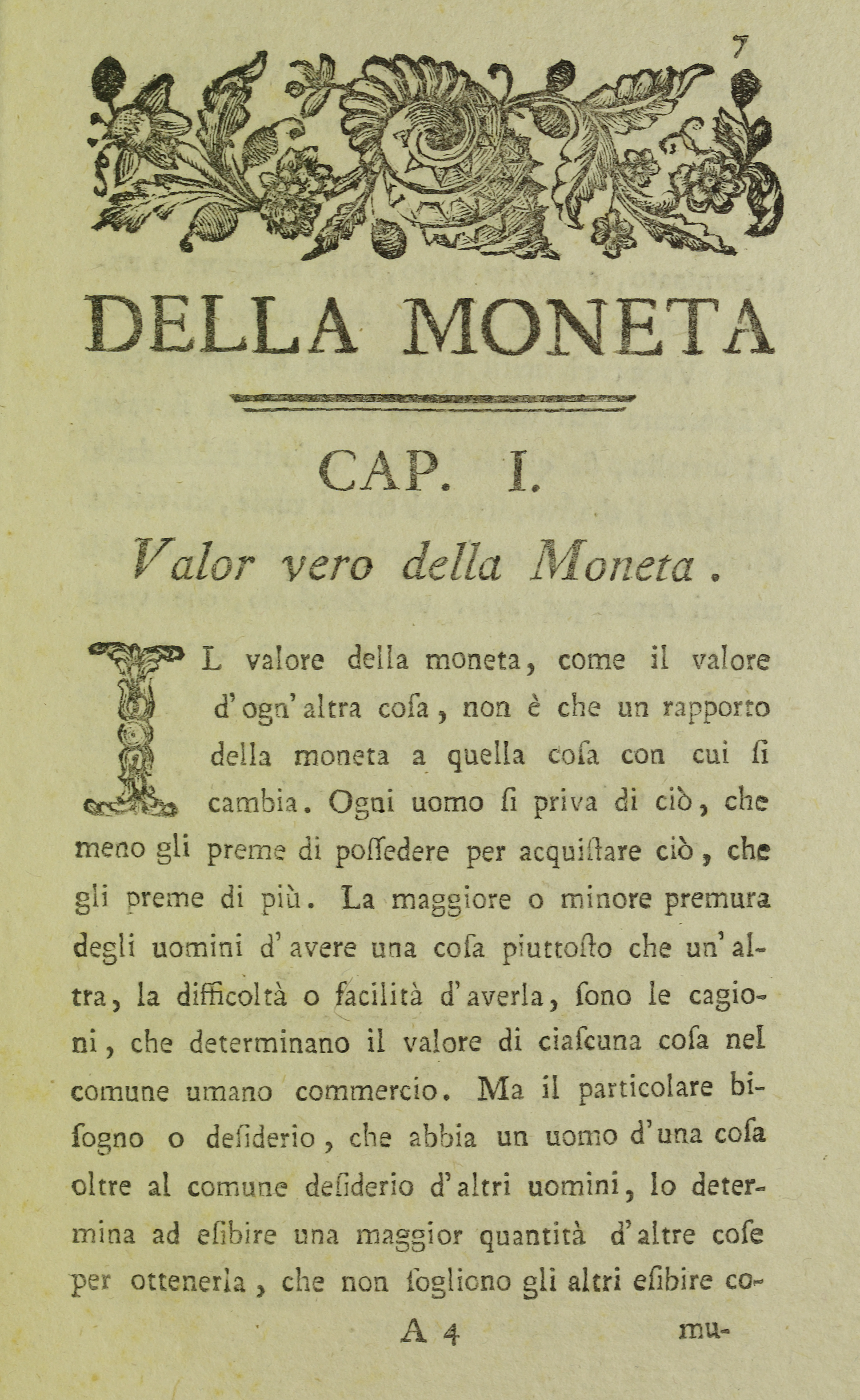
- Della moneta [On the Coin], Chapter I
- Born: Giovanni Battista Melchior Giacinto Vasco; October 10, 1733; Mondovì
- Died: November 11, 1796 (aged 63); Rocchetta Tanaro

Giambattista Vasco (10 October 1733 – 11 November 1796) was an Italian economist and abbot.

== Works ==
- I contadini: la felicità pubblica considerata nei coltivatori di terre proprie (in Italian). Brescia: Giammaria Rizzardi. 1769.
- Della naturale umana bipede positura: lettera critica (in Italian). Milan: Giuseppe Galeazzi. 1770.
- Della moneta: saggio politico (in Italian). Turin: Stamperia reale. 1788.
- L'usura libera: risposta al quesito proposto da Giuseppe II imperadore (in Italian). Milan: Luigi Veladini. 1792.
- Delle universita delle arti e mestieri: dissertazione (in Italian). Milan: Luigi Veladini. 1793.

== Bibliography ==
- Vasco, Giambattista entry (in Italian) by Ratti, Anna Maria in the Enciclopedia Treccani (1937)
- Sunna, Claudia (2012). Vasco, Giovanni Battista (in Italian). Treccani.

== See also ==
- Works related to Giambattista Vasco at Wikisource
