= Walter Vásquez Vejarano =

Peruvian lawyer and politician

Walter Vásquez Vejarano is a Peruvian lawyer and politician. Vejarano is a former president of the Supreme Court of Peru.
