= Peter Vaško =

Slovak footballer

Personal information
- Date of birth: 19 May 1987 (age 39)
- Place of birth: Skalica, Czechoslovakia
- Position: Midfielder

Youth career
- –2003: Skalica
- 2003–2006: Slovan Bratislava

Senior career*
Years	Team	Apps	(Gls)
2007–2009	Varnsdorf		
2009–2016	Skalica	18+	(1+)
2016–2018	Hundshein		
2018–2021	FK Milotice		
2021–2024	Mokry Haj		
2024–	Oreske		
- * Club domestic league appearances and goals

Peter Vaško (born 19 May 1987) is a Slovak former professional footballer who played as a midfielder. He is most known for his time with Slovak First Football League side MFK Skalica. He currently coaches the U13 youth category of MFK Skalica.

== Career ==
Vaško started playing football in his hometown of Skalica. As a 16 year old, he was scouted by Slovan Bratislava, where he spent the rest of his youth career. While playing for the club’s B team, he scored a brace against the A team in a 2–0 win in the Slovak Cup. After Slovan, he transferred to Czech side FK Varnsdorf, where he played for two seasons and then returned to MFK Skalica. He captained the side that was promoted to the first league in the 2014–15 season. An injury in training prevented him from debuting in the first league at the beginning of the season, and he only made his debut in the 7th round in a home match against Spartak Myjava. The injuries meant that he played only 18 matches in the top competition, the last of which was a victory against ViOn Zlaté Moravce. He scored his only goal in the Záhorácke derby in a 2–2 draw between Skalica and Senica, when he equalized at 1–1. Health problems persisted for Vašek, so he went abroad to play in Austria. In 2021, he joined OFK Mokrý Háj.
