= Guillermo Vasquez Corner =

Streetcorner in Queens

Coordinates: 40.7452°N 73.8882°W

Guillermo Vasquez Corner is a streetcorner named after Guillermo Vasquez, a leading gay rights, AIDS, and Latino community activist in Queens, New York.

== Description ==
The corner is located at the intersection of 77th Street and Broadway. Councilman Daniel Dromm drafted legislation for the name change.

The location to name this corner was chosen because it is located near the site of Love Boat, a former gay Latino bar where Vasquez educated the community about HIV/AIDS.

== Eponymous origins ==
Guillermo Vasquez (1953–1996), who emigrated from Colombia in 1972, was a leading activist in Queens, New York. Vasquez was involved with Queens Gays and Lesbians United and Empire State Pride Agenda. Vasquez died due to AIDS-related complications in 1996.
