= Rafael Vásquez =

Rafael Vásquez may refer to

- Rafael Vásquez (politician), Peruvian politician
- Rafael Vásquez (baseball), former Major League Baseball pitcher
- Ráfael Vásquez (general), general in the Mexican Army
