= Angie Vázquez =

Mexican singer

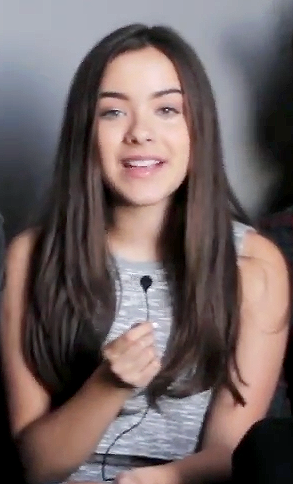
- Vázquez in 2016

Background information
- Born: Ángela Vázquez Espinoza; January 17, 2001 (age 25); Mexicali, Baja California, Mexico
- Genres: Pop; folk; rock
- Occupation: Singer
- Years active: 2011–present
- Labels: Sony, Virgin Music Label & Artist Services
- Member of: Vázquez Sounds

Ángela Vázquez Espinoza (born January 17, 2001) is a Mexican singer. She is best known for being the lead vocalist of the pop trio Vázquez Sounds.

== Career ==
Vázquez first gained notoriety at the age of 10 years old. After her band Vázquez Sounds uploaded the video of their cover for "Rolling in the Deep", a song originally performed by British singer Adele, in late 2011, the video went viral and the group became an internet sensation in Mexico and in other Spanish-speaking countries.

She provided vocals for three albums with Vázquez Sounds: Vázquez Sounds (2012), Invencible (2014), and Sweet Christmas Ukulele & Jazz (2015).

== Albums ==
=== With Vázquez Sounds ===
Year	Album	Peak chart positions
2012	Vázquez Sounds: Released: April 19, 2012; Format: CD + DVD; Label: Sony Music Latinoamérica	Mexico: 4

Year	Album	Peak chart positions
2014	Invencible: Released: September 9, 2014; Format: CD, digital download; Label: Sony Music Latinoamérica	N/A

Year	Album	Peak chart positions
2015	Sweet Christmas Ukulele & Jazz: Released: November 13, 2015; Format: CD (limited), digital download; Label: N/A	N/A

Year	Album	Peak chart positions
2019	Phoenix: Released: November 13, 2019; Format: digital download; Label: N/A	N/A

Year	Album	Peak chart positions
2014	Locos por la Música: Released: July 22, 2014; Format: digital download; Label: Sony Music Latinoamérica	Mexico: 1

=== Solo ===
Year	EP	Peak chart positions
2022	Recuerdo: Released: June 1, 2022; Format: digital download; Label: Virgin Music Label & Artist Services	N/A

Year	Album	Peak chart positions
2023	Uno de Nosotros: Released: May 17, 2023; Format: digital download; Label: Virgin Music Label & Artist Services	N/A

== Singles ==
Over the years, Vázquez has provided the vocals for several music covers that have been released as singles, and she has also released several original songs.

- 2011: "Rolling in the Deep" (originally performed by Adele)
- 2011: "All I Want for Christmas is You" (originally performed by Mariah Carey)
- 2012: "Forget You" (originally performed by Cee Lo Green)
- 2012: "The Show" (originally performed by Lenka)
- 2012: "I Want You Back" (originally performed by The Jackson 5)
- 2012: "Let It Be" (originally performed by The Beatles)
- 2012: "Skyscraper" (originally performed by Demi Lovato)
- 2013: "Time After Time" (originally performed by Cyndi Lauper)
- 2013: "Next to Me" (originally performed by Emeli Sandé)
- 2013: "Complicated" (originally performed by Avril Lavigne)
- 2013: "Blowin' in the Wind" (originally performed by Bob Dylan)
- 2014: "Te soñaré" (original song)
- 2014: "Me voy, me voy" (original song)
- 2014: "Volaré" (original song)
- 2014: "Invencible" (original song)
- 2014: "En mí, no en ti" (original song)
- 2015: "Riptide" (originally performed by Vance Joy)
- 2015: "Buenos Dias Señor Sol" (originally performed by Juan Gabriel)
- 2016: "Dreams" (originally performed by Fleetwood Mac)
- 2017: "Te Encontré" (original song)
- 2017: "Julio" (original song)
- 2018: "Volverte a ver" (original song)
- 2019: "What a Feeling" (originally performed by Irene Cara)
- 2022: "Recuerdo" (original song)
- 2022: "Si Te Vas" (original song)
- 2022: "Hoy Te Quiero Ver" (original song)
- 2022: "En Libertad" (original song)
- 2023: "Primer Amor" (original song)
