= Vasko (given name) =

Vasko (Cyrillic: Васко) is a masculine given name. It is a diminutive of Vasil or Vasilije, South Slavic versions of Basil.

Notable people with the name include:

- Vasko Atanasov
- Vasko Boev
- Vasko Božinovski
- Vasko Dimitrovski
- Vasko Eftov
- Vasko Gjurchinovski
- Vasko Kalezić
- Vasko Lipovac
- Vasko Mladenov
- Vasko Naumovski
- Vasko Popa
- Vasko Ševaljević
- Vasko Simoniti
- Vasko Vasilev
