= Adrián Vázquez (footballer) =

Spanish footballer (born 2004)

Personal information
- Full name: Adrián Vázquez Núñez
- Date of birth: 19 April 2004 (age 22)
- Place of birth: Mairena del Alcor, Spain
- Height: 1.75 m (5 ft 9 in)
- Position: Right-back

Team information
- Current team: Las Palmas B
- Number: 2

Youth career
- Betis

Senior career*
Years	Team	Apps	(Gls)
2021–2023	Betis B	4	(0)
2023–2025	Córdoba B	39	(0)
2023–2025	Córdoba	4	(0)
2025–	Las Palmas B	10	(0)
- * Club domestic league appearances and goals as of 16 May 2026

Adrián Vázquez Núñez (born 19 April 2004) is a Spanish footballer who plays as a right-back for Segunda Federación club Las Palmas Atlético.

== Career ==
Vázquez was born in Mairena del Alcor, Seville, Andalusia, and was a youth product of Real Betis. He made his senior debut with the reserves on 18 December 2021, coming on as a late substitute for Raúl García in a 3–0 Primera Federación away loss to Real Madrid Castilla.

On 10 July 2023, after finishing his formation, Vázquez signed a one-year contract with Córdoba CF, being initially assigned to the reserves in Tercera Federación. He made his first team debut on 3 December, playing the last six minutes in a 1–0 win at UD Melilla, and featured in one further match for the main squad during the campaign as the club achieved promotion to Segunda División.

Vázquez agreed to a new one-year deal with the Blanquiverdes on 14 July 2024, and made his professional debut on 23 November, starting in a 2–2 home draw against Real Zaragoza.
