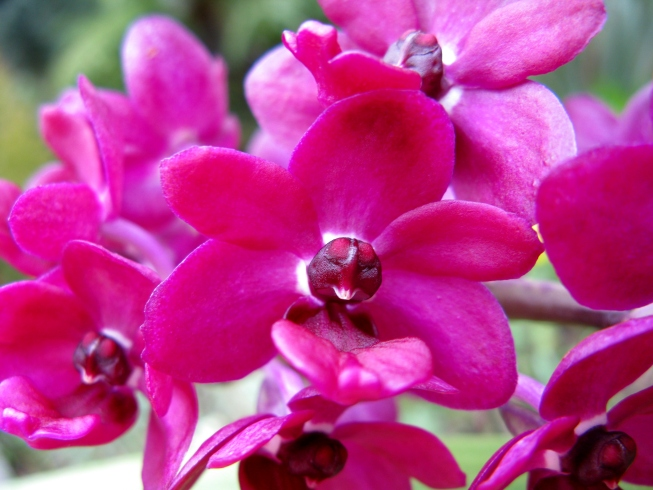
- Red form
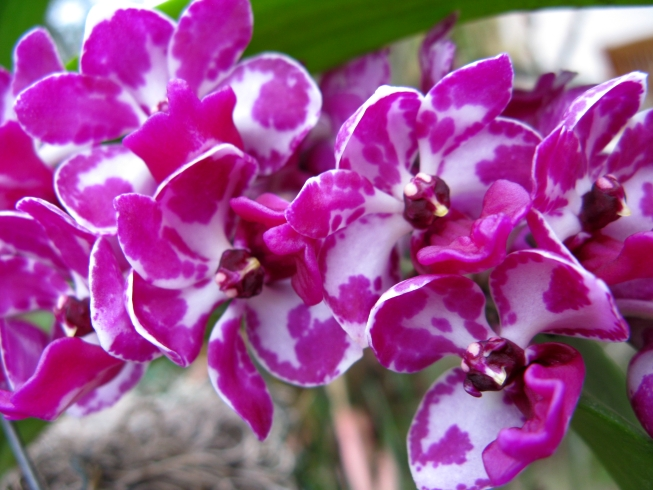
- Spotted form

Scientific classification
- Kingdom: Plantae
- Clade: Tracheophytes
- Clade: Angiosperms
- Clade: Monocots
- Order: Asparagales
- Family: Orchidaceae
- Subfamily: Epidendroideae
- Genus: Rhynchostylis
- Species: R. gigantea

Binomial name
- Rhynchostylis gigantea (Lindl.) Ridl.

Synonyms
- Saccolabium giganteum Lindl. [basionym]; Gastrochilus giganteus (Lindl.) Kuntze; Anota gigantea (Lindl.) Fukuy.

= Rhynchostylis gigantea =

Species of orchid

Rhynchostylis gigantea is a species of orchid. This species was first described in 1896 by John Lindley and is native to Borneo, Myanmar, Thailand, Peninsular Malaysia, Laos, Cambodia, Vietnam, China (Hainan) and the Philippines.

Rhynchostylis differs from Vanda by the one-lobed lip. Rhynchostylis are also commonly called foxtail orchids because of their long, thin, densely packed inflorescences that get up to 37 centimetres (15 in) with sweetly fragrant blooms. The inflorescences appear in autumn and winter. Due to the wide distribution of Rhynchostylis gigantea, there is a range of different clones: flowers vary slightly in shape and colour (from white to dark red, with spotted forms).

Unlike Vanda species, they need indirect light. Rhynchostylis gigantea are best grown in a wood-slat basket with little or no potting material and will grow massive fleshy roots entangled throughout the basket if given uniform water and fertilizer. The plants are warm- to hot-growing. it is the state flower of the Indian state of Assam where it is known as kopouful (কপৌফুল) in Assamese.

== Subspecies ==
- Rhynchostylis gigantea subsp. gigantea – all of species range except Philippines
- Rhynchostylis gigantea subsp. violacea (Lindl.) Christenson – Philippines
