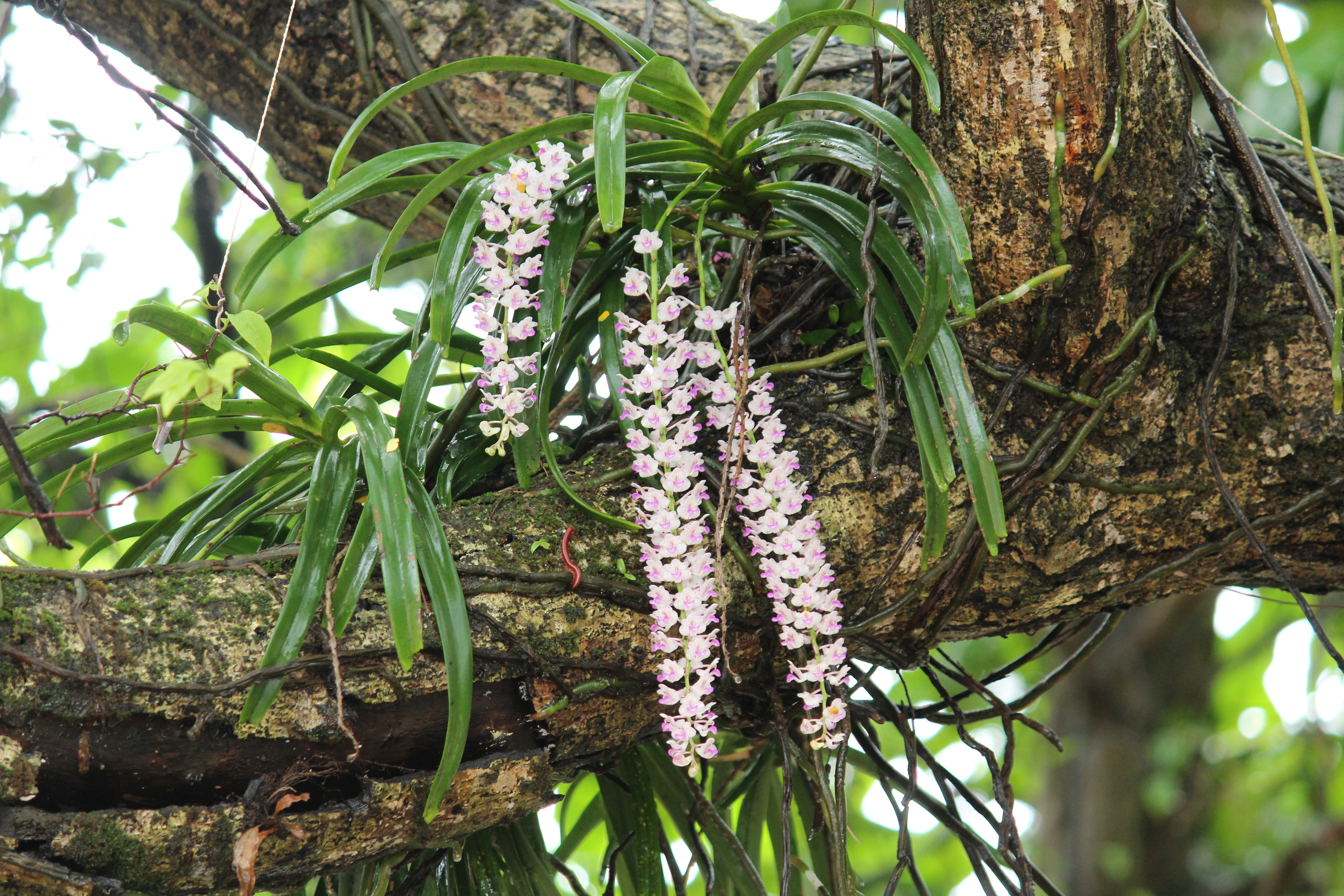
- Rhynchostylis retusa

Scientific classification
- Kingdom: Plantae
- Clade: Tracheophytes
- Clade: Angiosperms
- Clade: Monocots
- Order: Asparagales
- Family: Orchidaceae
- Subfamily: Epidendroideae
- Tribe: Vandeae
- Subtribe: Aeridinae
- Genus: Rhynchostylis; Blume

Type species
- Rhynchostylis retusa (Sw.) Blume.

Synonyms
- Anota Schltr.

= Rhynchostylis =

Genus of orchids

Rhynchostylis (abbreviated Rhy in the horticultural trade) is a genus in the orchid family (Orchidaceae), closely allied to the genus Vanda (from which it differs in the one-lobed lip of the flower) and comprising four currently accepted species native to the Indian subcontinent, China, Indochina, Malaysia, Indonesia and the Philippines.

== Etymology ==
The name consists of a compound of two Greek elements : rhynchos 'beak' and stylis 'column' – in reference to the very broad, fleshy column of the flower.

== Description ==
The flowers are borne in dense racemes and are noted for their intense, spicy fragrance. Although lacking in pseudobulbs, the plants have leathery leaves that are drought-resistant. These orchids grow naturally in warm, moist, shaded tropical areas and will thrive in cultivation if given consistent warmth, uniform moisture and bright, but indirect light. Hobbyists wanting to grow them will need a warm, humid growing environment with gentle air movement. They can be grown in pots, but are better grown in baskets, owing to the extreme fleshiness of their roots. Their unusually fragrant blooms often appear in the slightly cooler winter months.

== Cultivation ==
Despite being in the Vanda tribe, they are very different from vandas. They grow more slowly, their roots are more fragile, and almost any direct sun will harm them. However, they are typically grown with no potting mix on slat baskets or mounted in the same way as vandas.

== Uses ==
The genus possesses valuable medicinal properties meriting in-depth pharmacological investigation, including antispasmodic and antiseptic activity. Several species have been found to contain alkaloids.

== Taxonomy ==
=== Placement in subtribe Aeridinae ===
The Subtribe was changed from Sarcanthinae (Benth, 1881) to Aeridinae (Pfitzer, 1887) in 1972.

=== Species ===
As of December 2023, four species are recognized:

- Rhynchostylis gigantea (Lindl.) Ridl. – widespread in Hainan, Andaman Islands, Myanmar, Thailand, Vietnam, Laos, Cambodia, Malaysia, Borneo, Philippines
  - Rhynchostylis gigantea subsp. gigantea – all of species range except Philippines
  - Rhynchostylis gigantea subsp. violacea (Lindl.) Christenson – Philippines
- Rhynchostylis retusa (L.) Blume – Yunnan, Guizhou, India, Sri Lanka, Nepal, Bhutan, Assam, Bangladesh, Andaman & Nicobar Islands, Indochina, Malaysia, Borneo, Sumatra, Java, Philippines
- Rhynchostylis rieferi (Higgins) – Philippines
- Rhynchostylis cymifera Yohannan, J.Mathew & Szlach. - South Western Ghats, India

=== Formerly included ===
- Rhynchostylis coelestis (Rchb.f.) A.H. Kent is now a synonym of Vanda coelestis (Rchb.f.) Motes.
