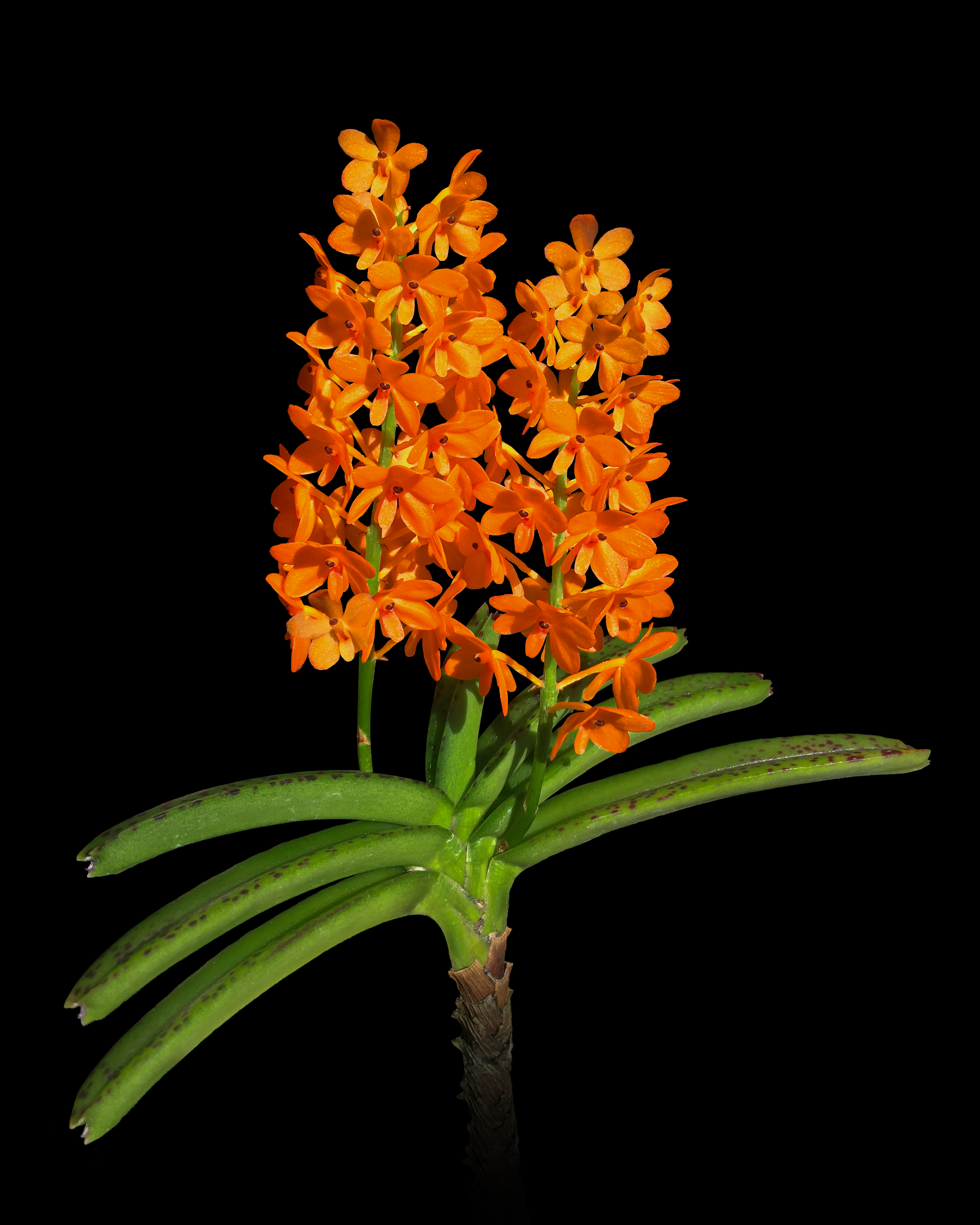

Scientific classification
- Kingdom: Plantae
- Clade: Tracheophytes
- Clade: Angiosperms
- Clade: Monocots
- Order: Asparagales
- Family: Orchidaceae
- Subfamily: Epidendroideae
- Genus: Vanda
- Species: V. garayi

Binomial name
- Vanda garayi L.M.Gardiner

= Vanda garayi =

Species of orchid

Vanda garayi, or Garay's ascocentrum, is a small monopodial epiphytic orchid native to semi-deciduous and deciduous dry lowland forests of Thailand, Laos, and Sumatra.

== Description ==
Vanda garayi is a small (rarely larger than 15 cm) epiphytic orchid with numerous, long, thick, fleshy aerial roots and a stout, erect stem with persistent, distichous leaf bases. Its thick, straight, rigid leaves are apically toothed, distichous, ligulate, and conduplicate and often sprinkled with purple spots. Golden orange flowers about 1.3 cm across appear in compact, erect, conical 10–25 cm racemes in late spring to early summer. The narrow spur contains copious nectar and the flowers, like most species formerly classified as Ascocentrum, lack fragrance or nectar guides. A dark brown anther cap protects the pollinia.

Two factors contribute to frequent mislabeling of Vanda garayi in cultivation. Firstly, following the publication Genera Orchidacearum volume 6 in 2014, all Ascocentrum species are included in the genus Vanda. In trade many specimens are sold under their former genus. Secondly, Vanda garayi is often confused with the rarer Vanda miniatum. Thus, Vanda garayi is more often than not labeled as Ascocentrum miniatum. V. garayi and V. miniatum are definitively distinguished by their flowers and thus a bloom must be observed, though their leaves differ as well. V. garayi's flowers are solid golden orange with rounded petals and sepals and a straight lip. V. miniatum's flowers are slightly transparent, reddish, and noticeably veined, its petals and sepals are narrower, and its lip is recurved. V. garayi's leaves are usually shorter and thicker.

== Distribution ==
Vanda garayi is found growing epiphytically on deciduous trees in warm to hot climates between sea level and 1000 meters in Cambodia, Laos, Malaysia, Sumatra, Thailand, Vietnam, and the foothills of the Himalayas.

== Cultivation ==
Vanda garayi has long been popular among orchid growers for its colorful blooms, small size, and ease of culture. The species thrives in very bright light and can tolerate full sun, developing purple anthocyanin spots in these conditions. While abundant water is beneficial, it must be allowed to dry quickly. Outdoors, it is often grown on wooden slats or in baskets to allow rapid drying after heavy rains. Indoors, clay pots partially filled with bark, charcoal, or wood are ideal. Strong and regular air movement mitigates soggy media. Temperatures are best kept between 15 °C and 30 °C as growth slows or stops below 10 °C and above 34 °C. Weekly to bi-weekly fertilizing is recommended with heavier feeding during the spring and summer.
