= Vanda jennae =

- CITES Appendix II (CITES)

Scientific classification
- Kingdom: Plantae
- Clade: Tracheophytes
- Clade: Angiosperms
- Clade: Monocots
- Order: Asparagales
- Family: Orchidaceae
- Subfamily: Epidendroideae
- Genus: Vanda
- Species: V. jennae

Binomial name
- Vanda jennae P.O'Byrne & J.J.Verm., 2005
- Distribution of Vanda jennae

Species of orchid

Vanda jennae is a species of Vanda endemic to Sulawesi, Indonesia. It was discovered in 2005 by Jaap J. Vermeulen and Peter O'Byrne.

== Description ==
Five to eight slightly fragrant flowers are produced on 20 cm long inflorescences. Each flower is approximately 4.5 - 5.5 cm wide. The sepals and petals bear striped patterns of reddish colouration. The labellum is flexible.

== Habitat ==
It exclusively inhabits the central region of Sulawesi and is typically found at elevations between 1000 and 1200 meters in a dry, grassy valley, where it thrives as an epiphyte on small trees.

== Etymology ==
The specific epithet jennae references Jenna, the daughter of Peter O'Byrne, who is one of the species authorities.

== Cultivation ==
Seeds of this species were distributed by Peter O'Byrne, who introduced it into cultivation.

== Conservation ==
The conservation status remains uncertain.
