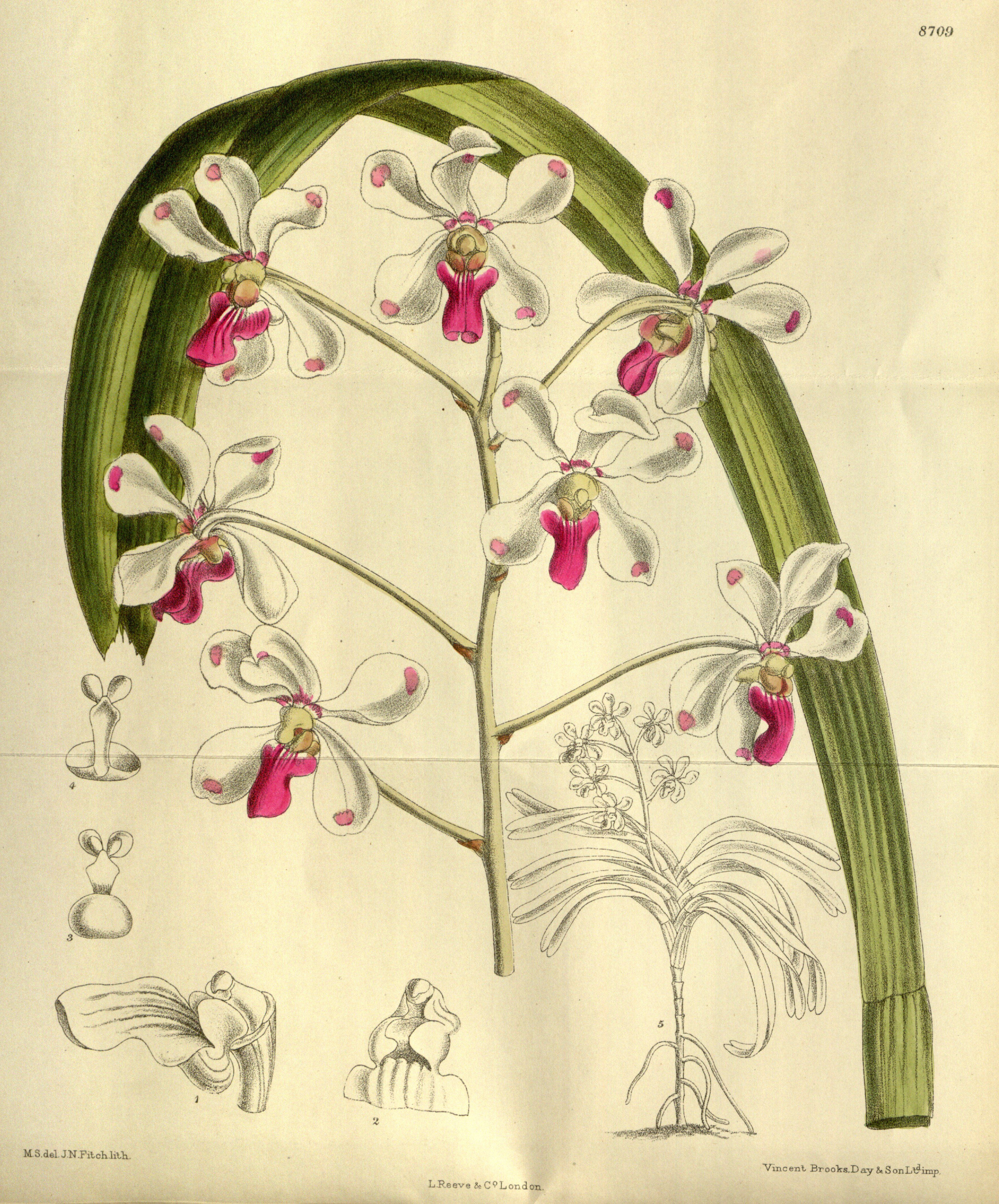

Scientific classification
- Kingdom: Plantae
- Clade: Tracheophytes
- Clade: Angiosperms
- Clade: Monocots
- Order: Asparagales
- Family: Orchidaceae
- Subfamily: Epidendroideae
- Genus: Vanda
- Species: V. luzonica

Binomial name
- Vanda luzonica Loher ex Rolfe

= Vanda luzonica =

Species of orchid

Vanda luzonica is a species of vanda, a flower of the orchid family. It is a rare type of orchid and is endangered. Vanda luzonica is named after the island of Luzon in the Philippines.

Vanda luzonica is epiphytic and can grow quite large (growing up to a metre long). It has leathery leaves growing from 20–50 cm (8–20 in) long. Its flowers look similar to those of Vanda tricolor. The flowers are spaced loosely and are a bit waxy. The sepals and petals of this orchid are white with purple streaks and pink spots near the tips.

Vanda luzonica is found in the regions of Zambales Mountains, Bulacan, Tarlac and Rizal. It grows best at low altitude and in a mix of shade and sunlight.
