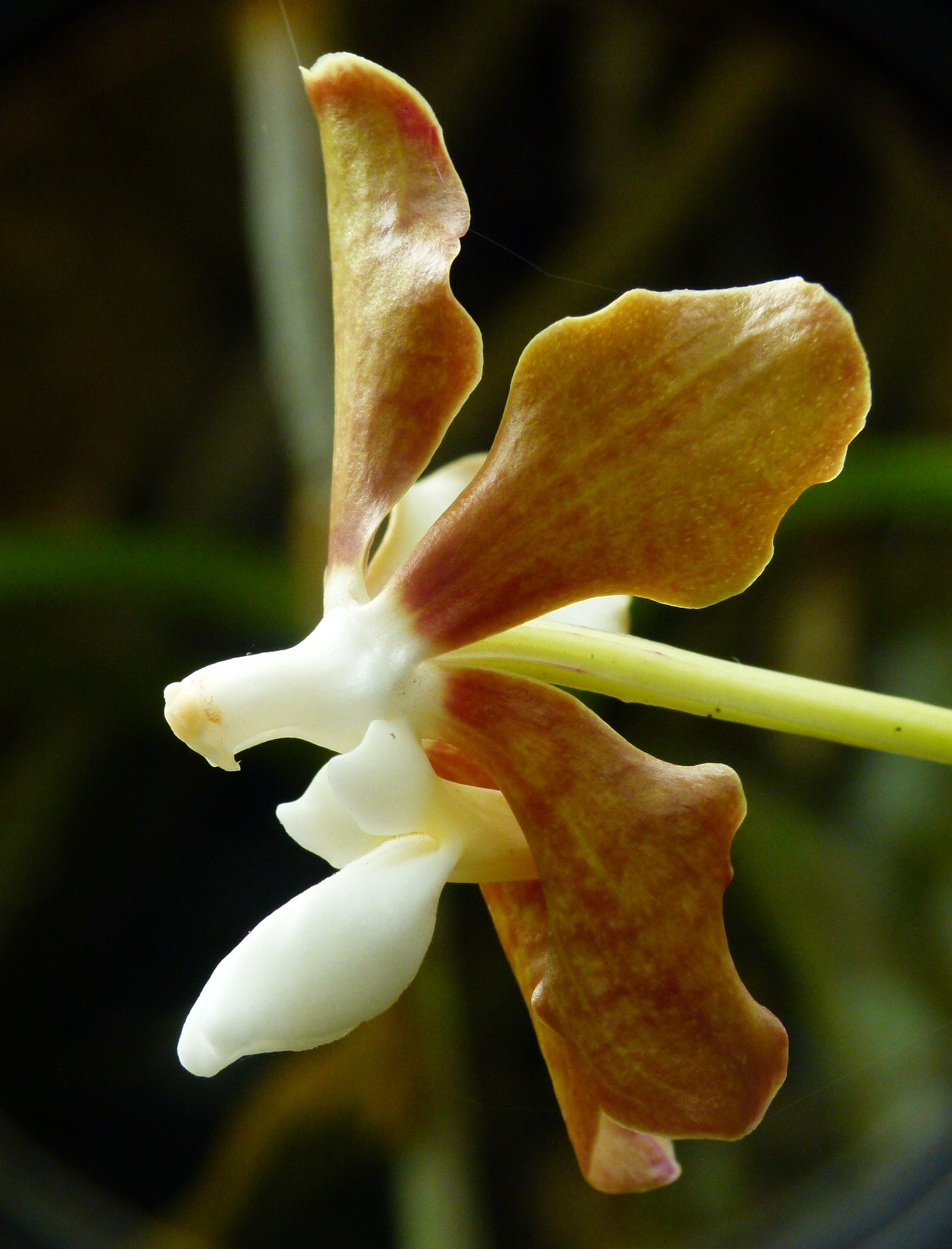

Conservation status
- Vulnerable (IUCN 3.1)
- CITES Appendix II (CITES)

Scientific classification
- Kingdom: Plantae
- Clade: Tracheophytes
- Clade: Angiosperms
- Clade: Monocots
- Order: Asparagales
- Family: Orchidaceae
- Subfamily: Epidendroideae
- Genus: Vanda
- Species: V. wightii

Binomial name
- Vanda wightii Rchb. f.

= Vanda wightii =

Species of orchid

Vanda wightii is a species of orchid from southern India and Sri Lanka. For some time it was thought to be extinct after being described in 1849. The species was however rediscovered and it is now known from India (Kerala, Karnataka, Tamil Nadu). It is closely related to Vanda thwaitesii. The species was named by Reichenback after the botanist and collector Robert Wight. 1.

== Description ==
They are epiphytes with stem 15–22 cm long, profusely rooting at the base, leaves closely arranged above. Leaves 7-35 x 1.1–2 cm, jointed at base, deeply channeled in the middle, V-shaped in cross section, keeled, thick, fleshy and coriaceous, unequally bilobed at apex. Inflorescence a simple and axillary raceme, 6–17 cm long with 2.5–3 mm thick peduncle; sterile bracts 1–2, tubular, covering the inflorescence axis; pedicel+ovary 4–5 cm long; floral bracts 2-2.5 x 4.5-5.5, triangular ovate, gland dotted, acute at apex. Flowers 2–3, pleasantly fragrant at dusk, reminding strongly the smell of Vanda tessellata /Cestrum nocturnum, 4-4.5 cm across, dirty brownish greenish yellow with light tessellations on sepals and petals, white at base and back side; dorsal sepal 2.1 -2.4 x 1.1-1.5 cm, ovate-oblong, clawed and obtuse at base, slightly wavy on margins, 7-veined, side veins branched, all veins connected by intravenal bridges; lateral sepals 2.1-2.5 x 1.4-1.5 cm, elliptic, obovate, obtuse at apex, 7-veined, margin at the basal portion backwardly folded; petals 2-2.4 x 1.2-1.3 cm, obovate-oblong, 5-veined, clawed at base, obtusely acute at apex; lip white throughout, with a flash of yellow at inner back wall of sac between the side lobes; 1.3 cm long with 1 cm long saccate spur, immovably attached to the base of a short column foot; side lobes 0.5x 0.4 cm, oblong, midlobe 1.1 x 0.9 cm, thick, fleshy with 2 keels, medianly deep channeled; spur 0.9-1 x 0.6 cm, wide-mouthed, laterally compressed, obtuse at apex, back wall with W-shaped orange marking, tip with small papillae; column 6-7 x 3.5–5 mm, white, broadened at apex; anther terminal, operculum 4 x 3.5 mm, 2 celled at base with one flap covering each cell, connected to column by a short neck at base; pollinarium with 2 obovoid pollinia, each pollinium 1.2 x 1.5 mm, cleft, attached by a thin transparent and elastic caudicle to transparent stipe; stipe thin and roughly triangular, folded at base to the broad and roughly ovate viscidium.

== Flowering and Fruiting ==
August to February with a peak during September to December.

== Altitude ==
Primarily at 60-80m but have been found as high up as 700m.

== Differences with other Vanda species in the region ==
The flowers are similar to Vanda tessellata in form, differing only in the shape of the sidelobes and fragrance. The sidelobes of Vanda tessellata are sharp while those of Vanda wightii are blunt. Also Vanda tessellata is fragrant during the day while Vanda wightii is fragrant at dusk. The plant habit of Vanda wightii is not as robust and hardy as Vanda tessellata. The leaves of Vanda wightii are closely placed, narrow and arching compared to Vanda tessellata. Recent phylogenetic studies have shown Vanda wightii to be closely related to Vanda tessellata than to Vanda thwaitesii. Vanda thwaitesii in contrast has been grouped together with the Trudelias. Vanda wightii shares a similar colouration to that of Vanda thwaitesii though the floral structure is entirely different.
