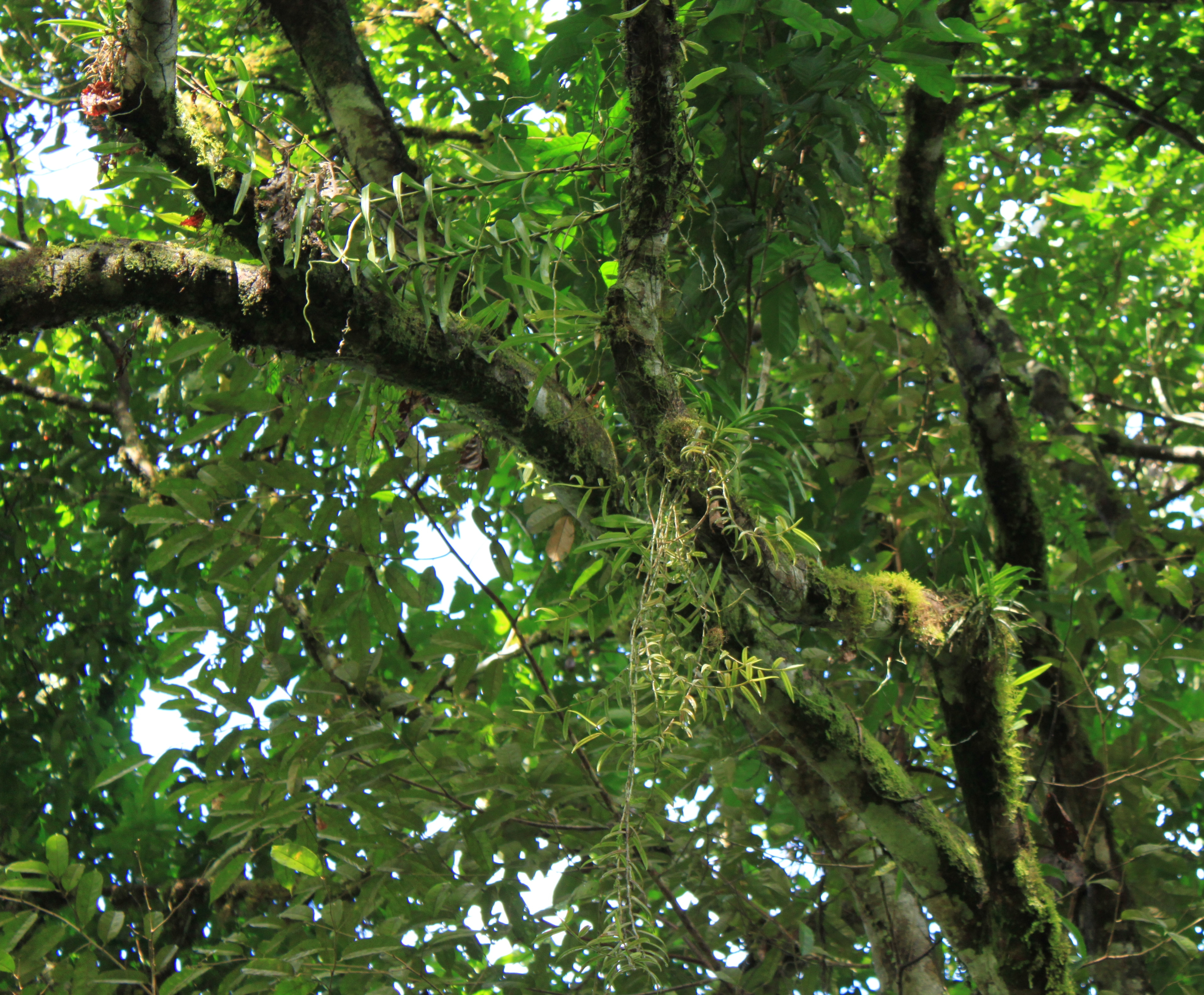

Conservation status
- Endangered (IUCN 3.1)

Scientific classification
- Kingdom: Plantae
- Clade: Tracheophytes
- Clade: Angiosperms
- Clade: Monocots
- Order: Asparagales
- Family: Orchidaceae
- Subfamily: Epidendroideae
- Genus: Vanda
- Species: V. scandens

Binomial name
- Vanda scandens Holtt.

= Vanda scandens =

Species of orchid

Vanda scandens is a species of plant in the family Orchidaceae. It is endemic to Mindanao island and Palawan Island in the Philippines.

Its natural habitat is subtropical or tropical moist lowland forests.

It is an Endangered species on the IUCN Red List, threatened by habitat loss.

== See also ==
- Endemic orchids of the Philippines
- Endangered flora of Asia
