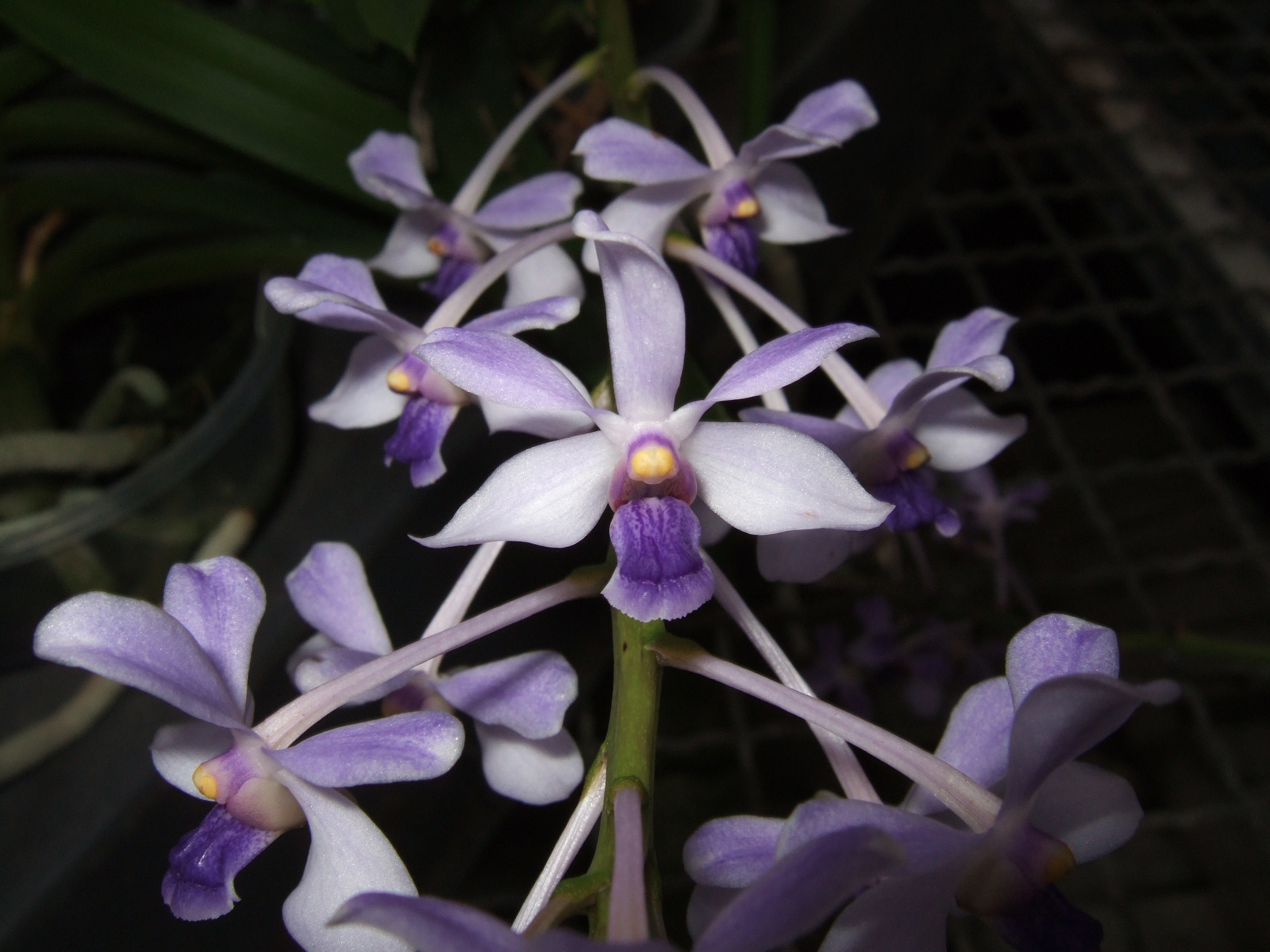
- Vanda coerulescens flowers

Scientific classification
- Kingdom: Plantae
- Clade: Tracheophytes
- Clade: Angiosperms
- Clade: Monocots
- Order: Asparagales
- Family: Orchidaceae
- Subfamily: Epidendroideae
- Genus: Vanda
- Species: V. coerulescens

Binomial name
- Vanda coerulescens Griff.

Synonyms
- Vanda coerulescens var. lowiana Rchb.f.; Vanda coerulescens var. hennisiana Schltr.

= Vanda coerulescens =

Species of orchid

Vanda coerulescens, also known as sky-blue vanda, is a species of monopodial orchid native to Assam and Arunachal Pradesh, India, eastern Himalayas, southern Yunnan province in China, Myanmar and Thailand.

== Description ==
The average height of V. coerulescens is between 30 and 60 cm. It has evergreen, apically bilobed strap leaves. It s an epiphytic perennial orchid species with erect or drooping axillary raceme inflorescences from terete stems. Inflorescences are long that may reach more than 30 cm, producing multiple fragrant and showy blue coloured flowers of about 3 cm. Its lip is oblong-lanceolate shaped with yellow-orange colour base, yellow mid-part and white apex. Outside of the lip has a white base colour and violet mid-part and apex. Sepals are tessellated netted and strikes/striped.

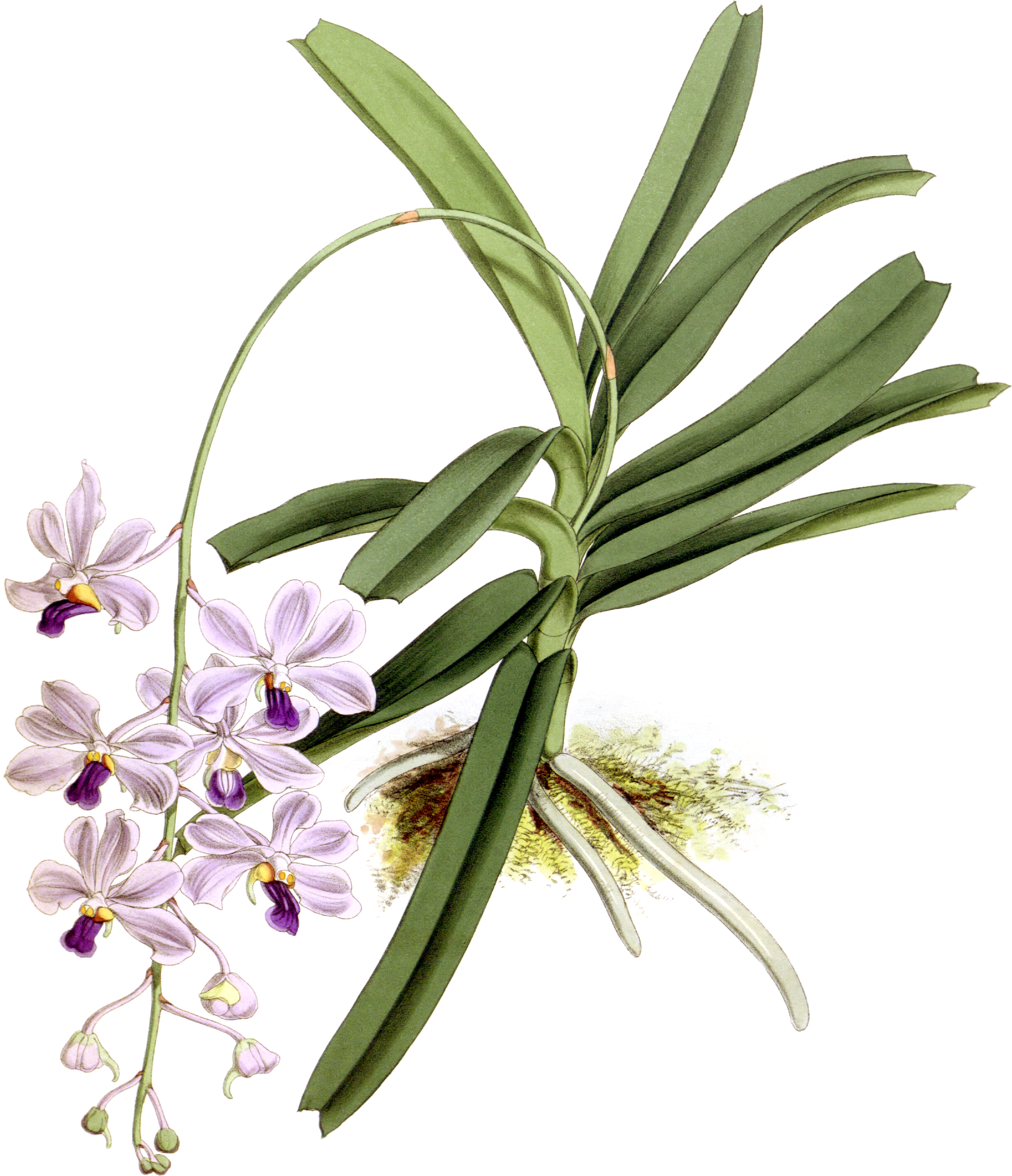
Coloured figure of Vanda coerulescens

== Growth conditions ==
Indoors it prefers very bright filtered light, growing well in intermediate to warm temperature. It is best grown in well drained soil in clay, basket (best option) or plastic pots and watered frequently. Like all Vandas, V. coerulescens grows best in wooden slat baskets with no media. Its flowers are long lasting.

Outdoors V. coerulescens is an epiphytic species that grows in hot to cool areas at elevations of 300 to 1200 meters, often found on tree trunks in open forests. It has been reported to flower in August to October.

Images of Vanda coerulescens
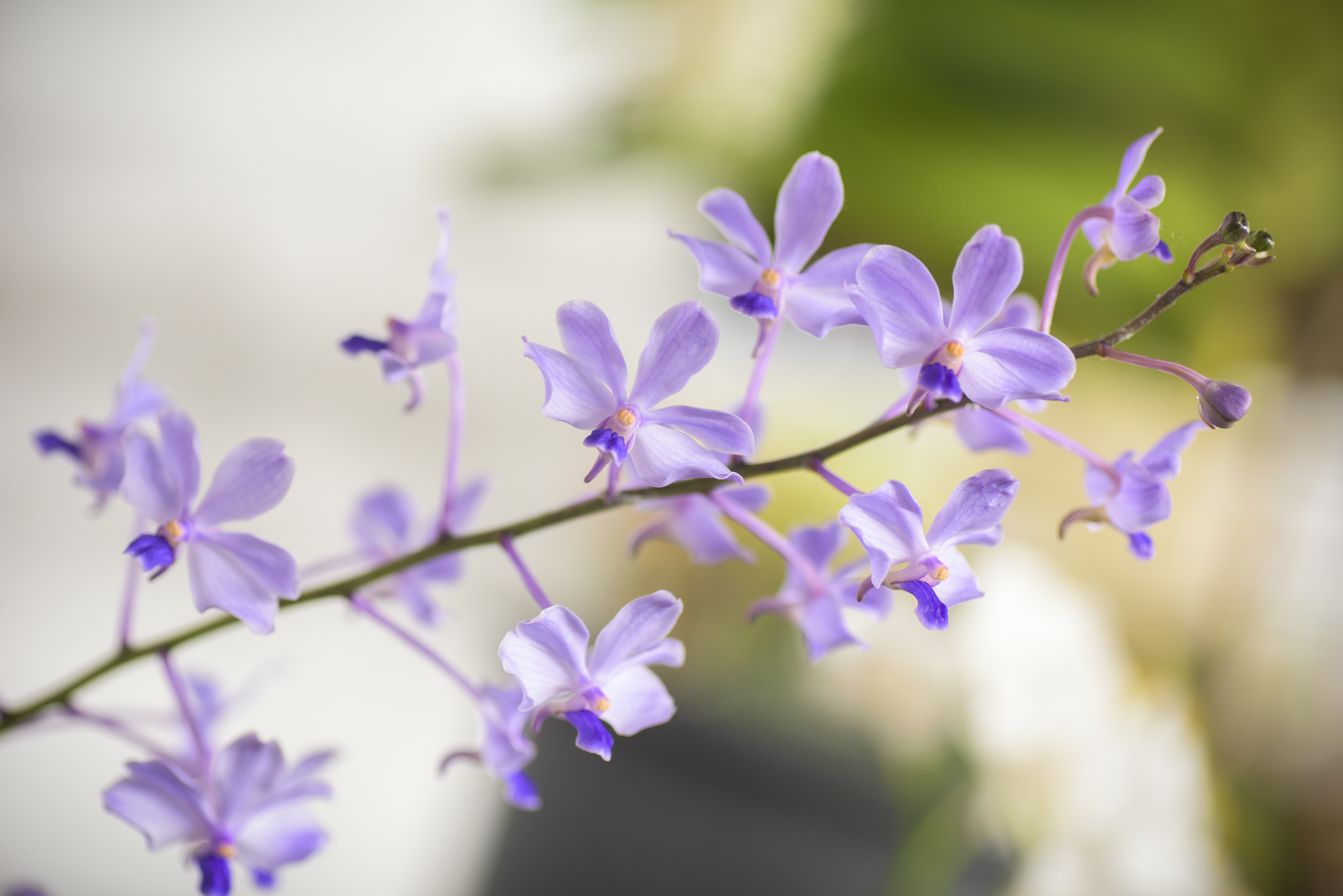
Vanda coerulescens inflorescence

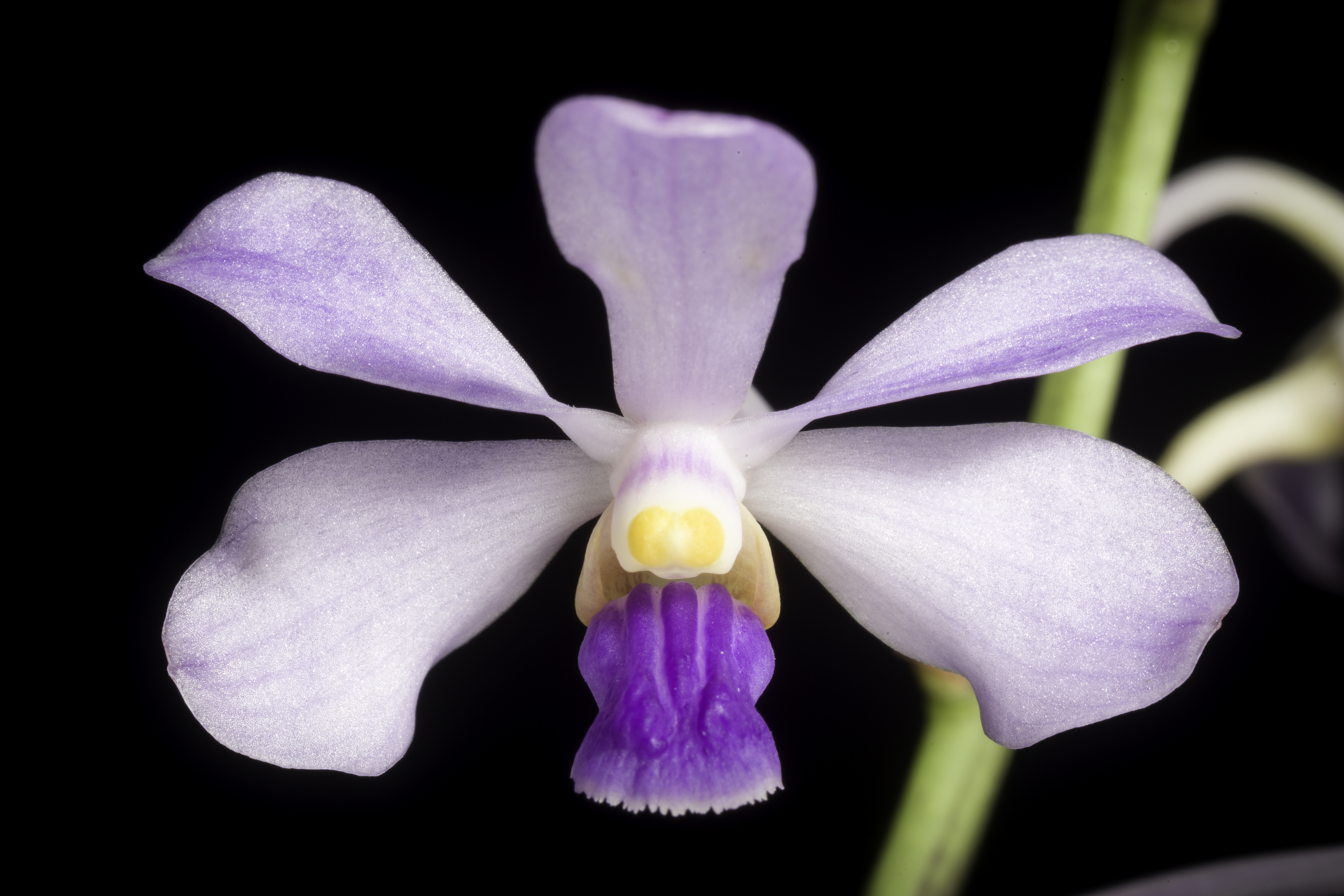
A single Vanda coerulescens flower

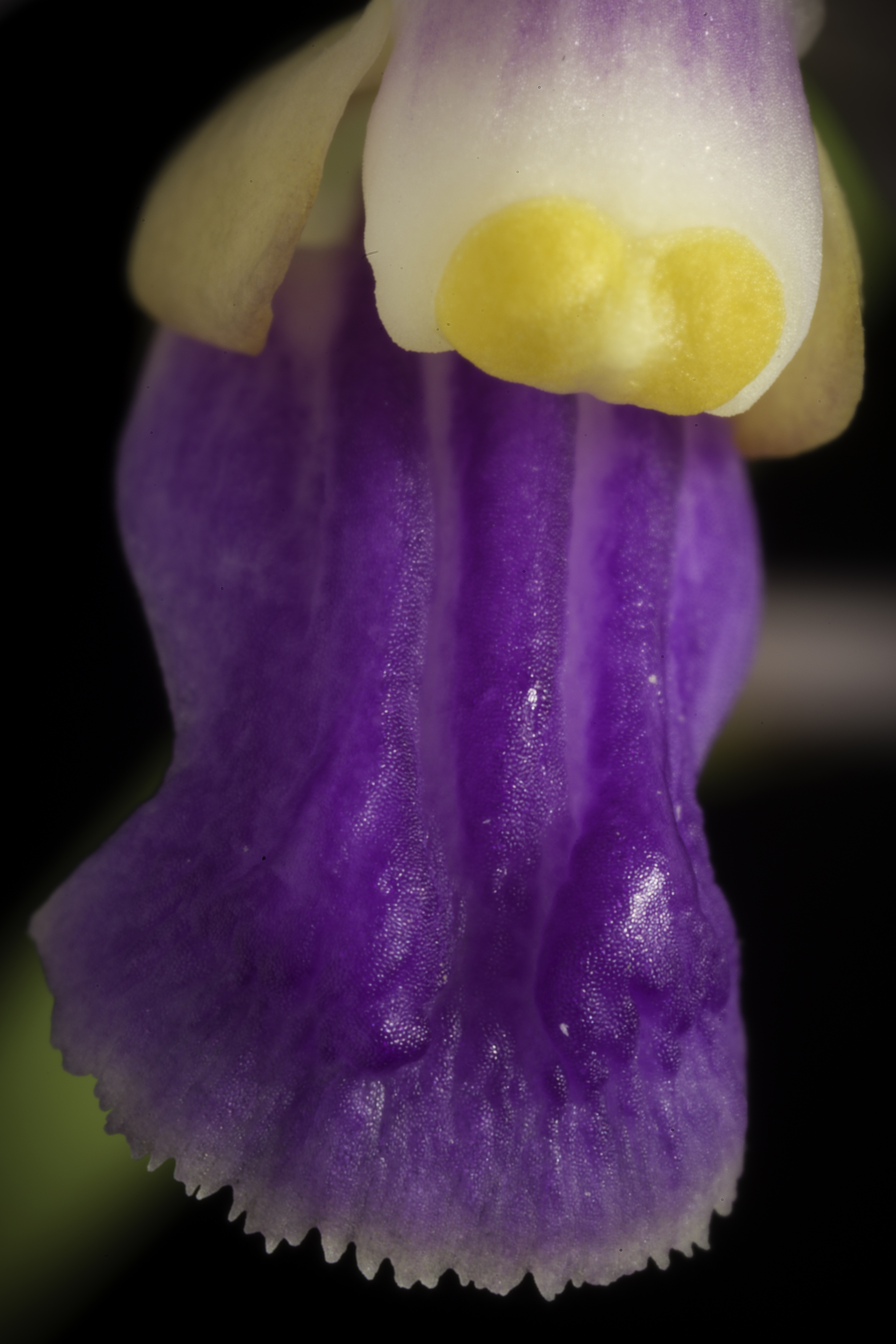
Close up view of the Vanda coerulescens lip
