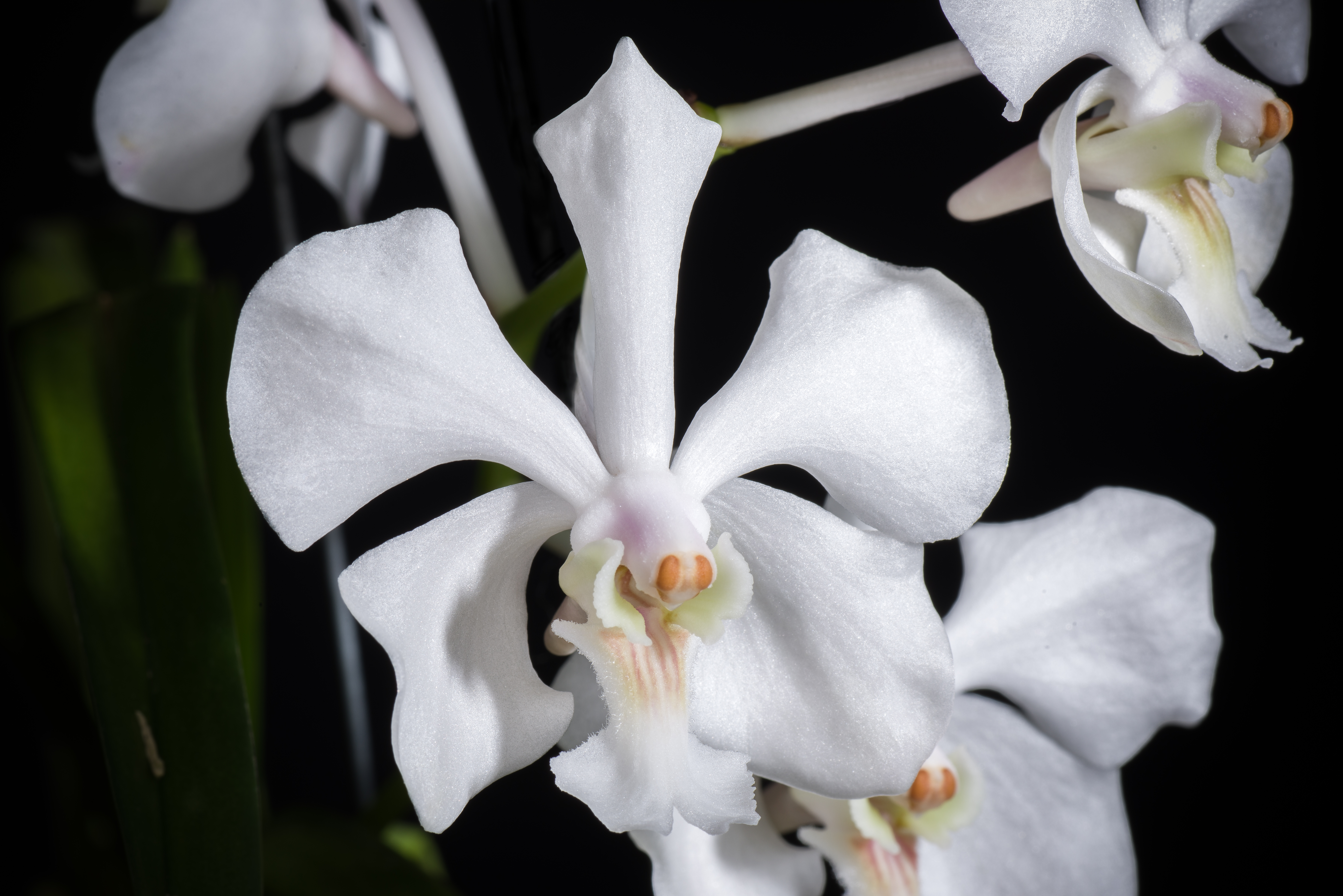

Conservation status
- Endangered (IUCN 3.1)

Scientific classification
- Kingdom: Plantae
- Clade: Tracheophytes
- Clade: Angiosperms
- Clade: Monocots
- Order: Asparagales
- Family: Orchidaceae
- Subfamily: Epidendroideae
- Genus: Vanda
- Species: V. javierae

Binomial name
- Vanda javierae Tiu ex Fessel & Leuckel

= Vanda javierae =

Species of orchid

Vanda javierae is a species of flowering plant in the orchid family, Orchidaceae. It is endemic to the Philippines, where it occurs on Luzon and Calayan Island. It is known commonly as Mrs. Javier's vanda.

This species grows in island forest habitat. It is not a protected area and the landscape is subjected to disturbance and degradation.
