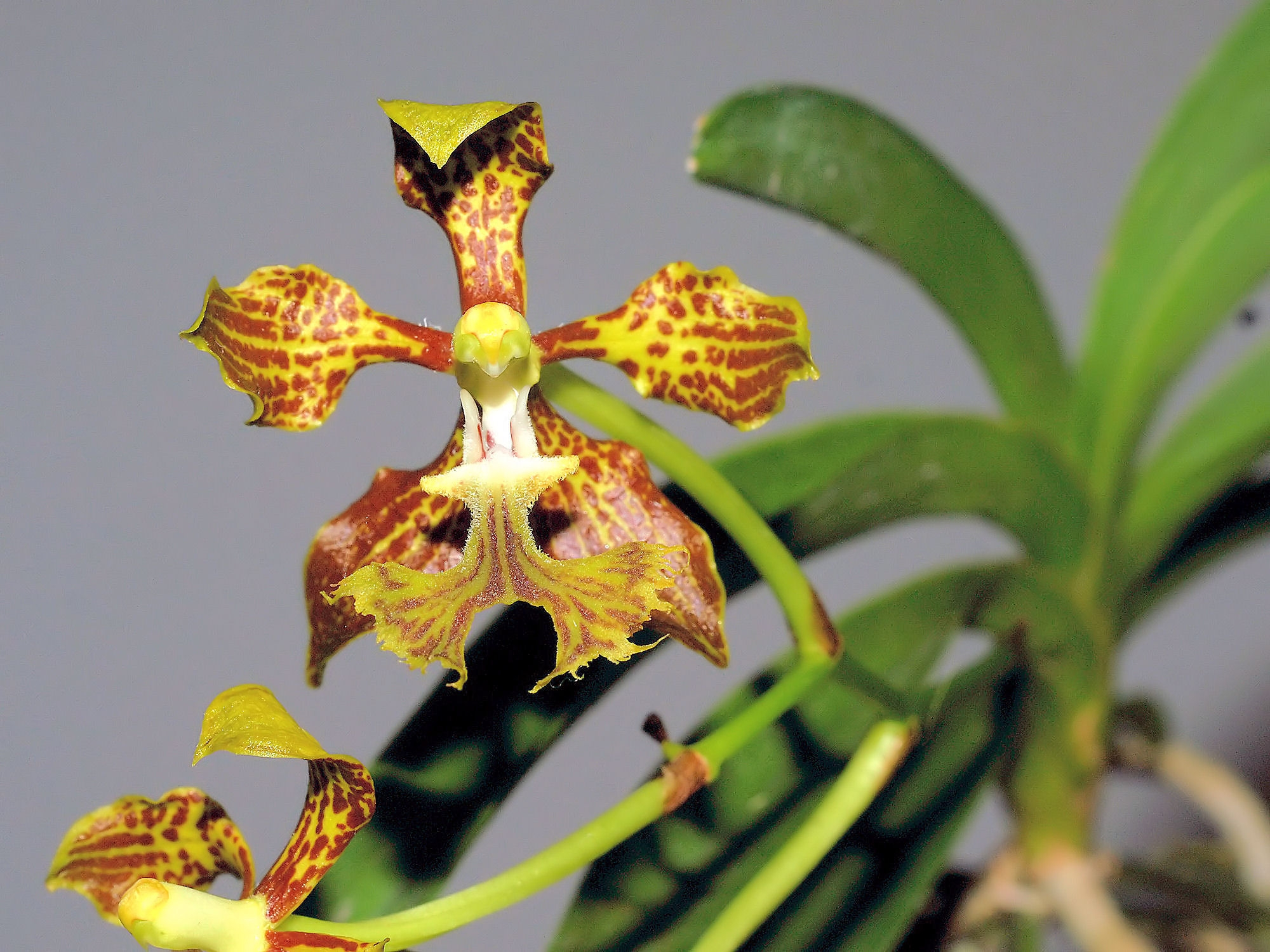
- Plant and flowers

Scientific classification
- Kingdom: Plantae
- Clade: Tracheophytes
- Clade: Angiosperms
- Clade: Monocots
- Order: Asparagales
- Family: Orchidaceae
- Subfamily: Epidendroideae
- Genus: Vanda
- Species: V. roeblingiana

Binomial name
- Vanda roeblingiana Rolfe (1894)

= Vanda roeblingiana =

Species of orchid

Vanda roeblingiana, Roebelen's vanda, is a species of orchid endemic to the mountain provinces of the island of Luzon in the Philippines. Hugh Low, a British colonial administrator and naturalist introduced the plant to London in 1893. The next year, Robert Allen Rolfe, an English botanist formally described the plant and thought it was originally collected from the vicinity of Singapore or Peninsular Malaysia. Low, who works in Clapton Nursery had collecting expedition to Southeast Asia with Singapore as headquarter.

== Gallery ==
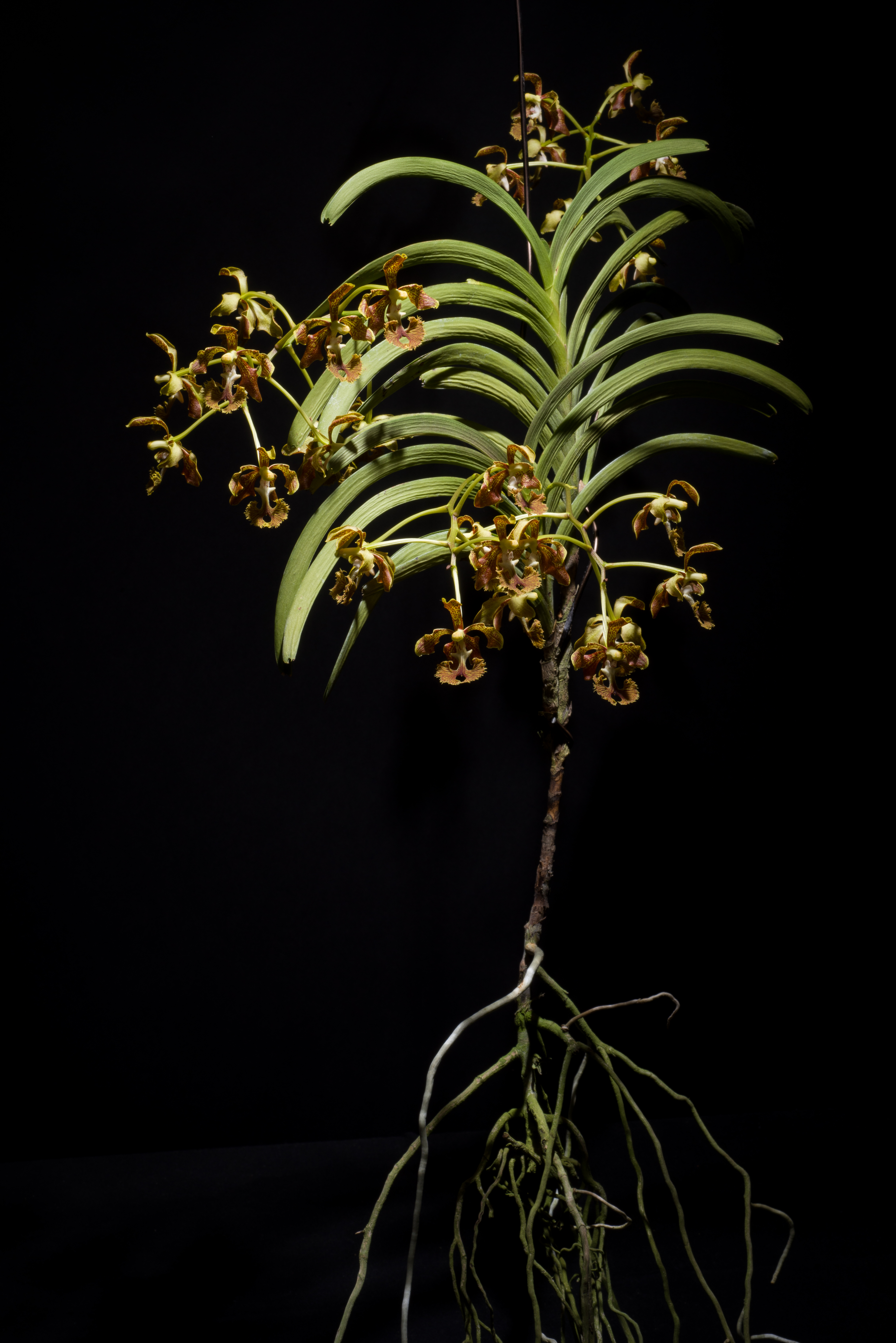
Specimen plant

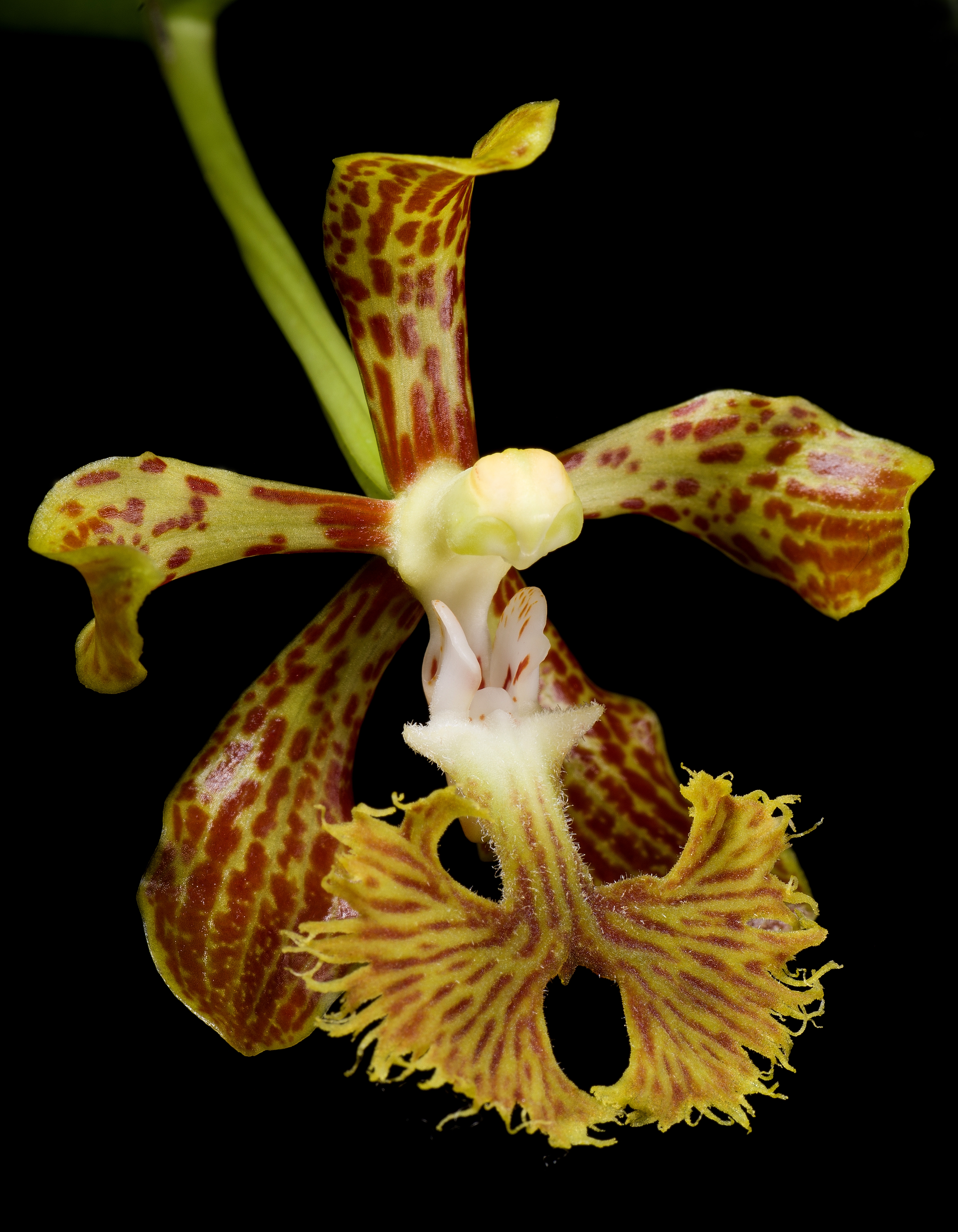
Flower

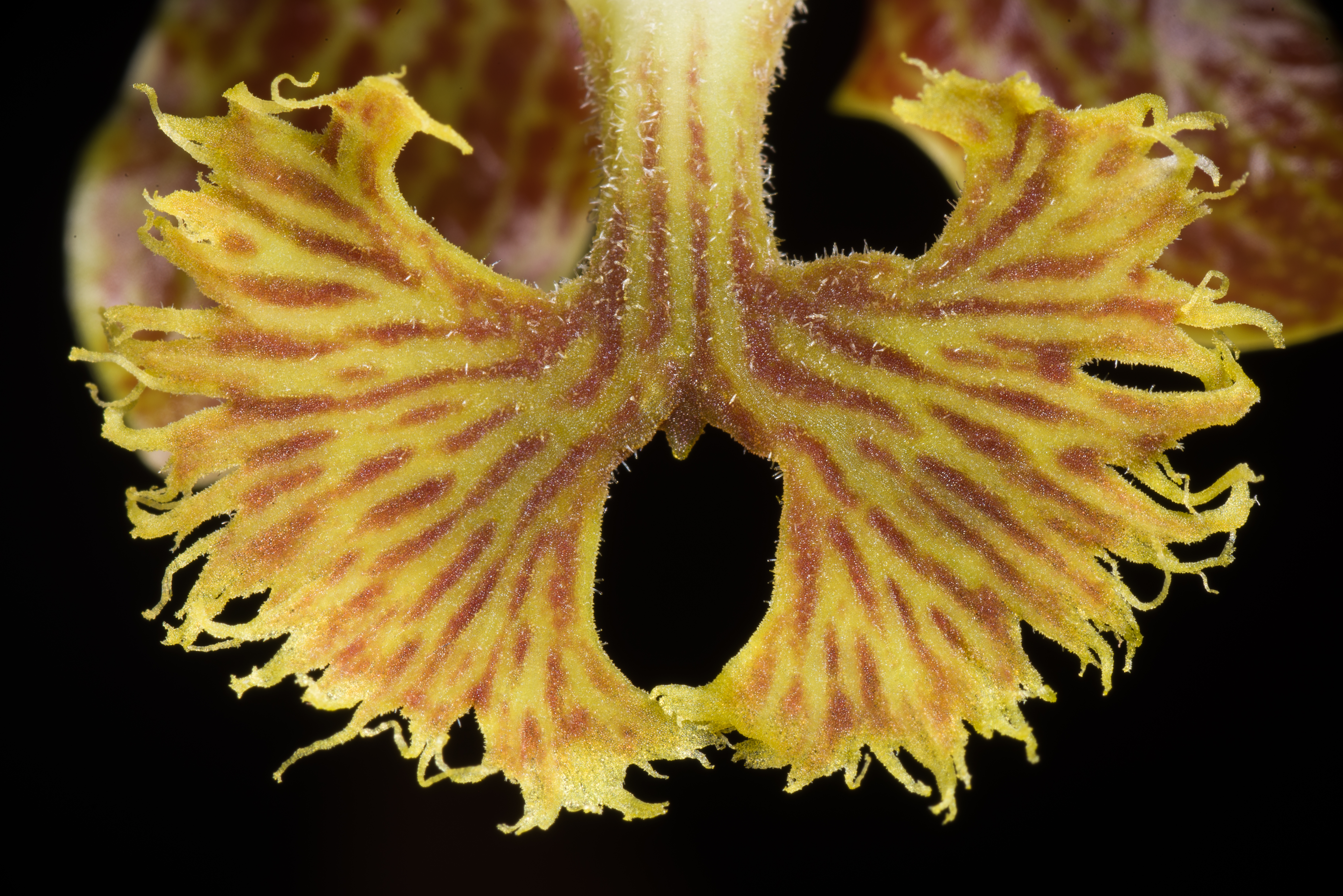
Close-up shot of lip

== See also ==
- List of the orchids of the Philippines
