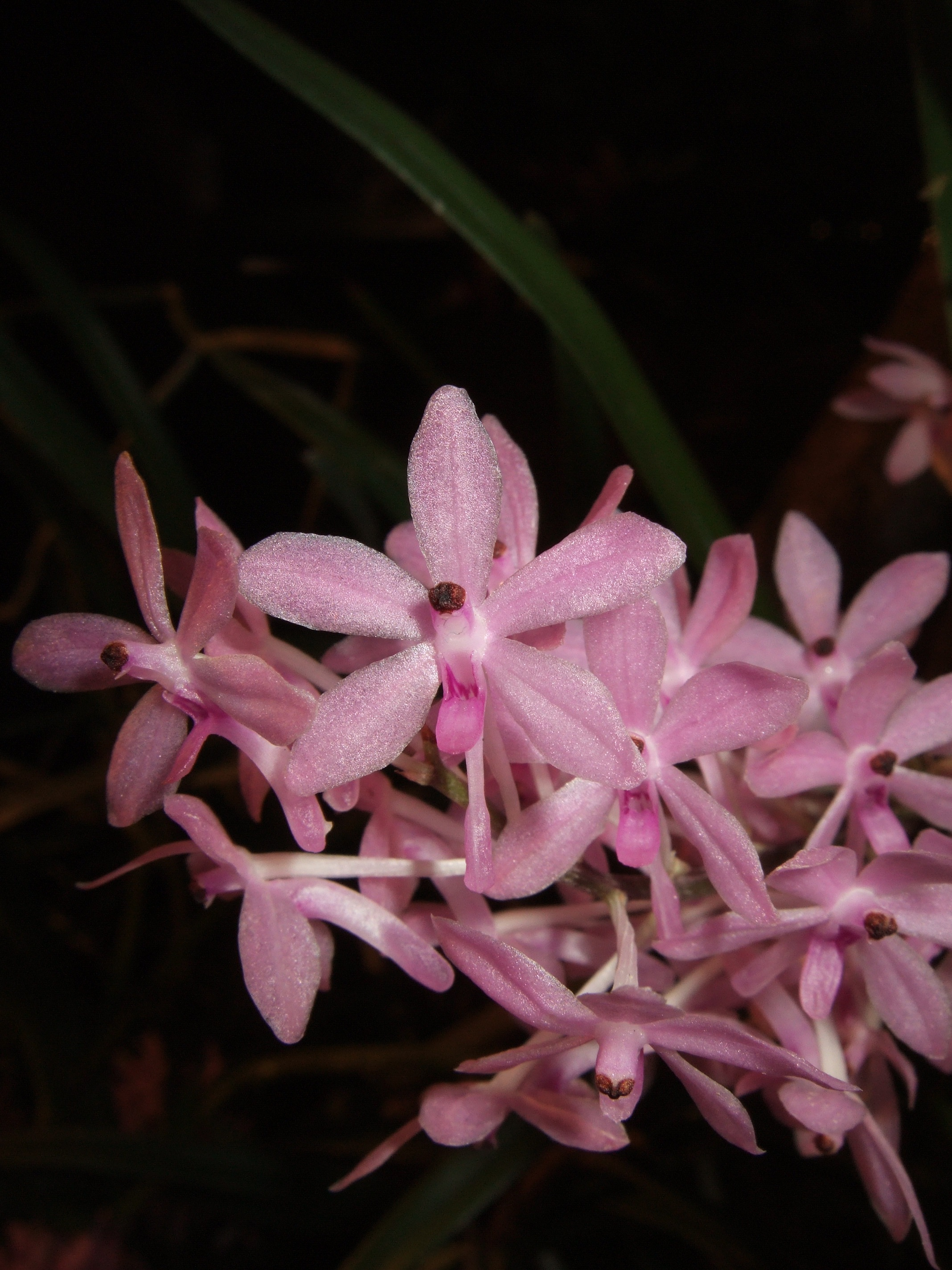

Scientific classification
- Kingdom: Plantae
- Clade: Tracheophytes
- Clade: Angiosperms
- Clade: Monocots
- Order: Asparagales
- Family: Orchidaceae
- Subfamily: Epidendroideae
- Genus: Vanda
- Species: V. christensoniana

Binomial name
- Vanda christensoniana (Haager) L.M.Gardiner

Synonyms
- Ascocentrum christensonianum Haager

= Vanda christensoniana =

Species of orchid

Vanda christensoniana is a species of orchid endemic to Vietnam. The specific epithet christensoniana honours the botanist and taxonomist Eric Christenson.

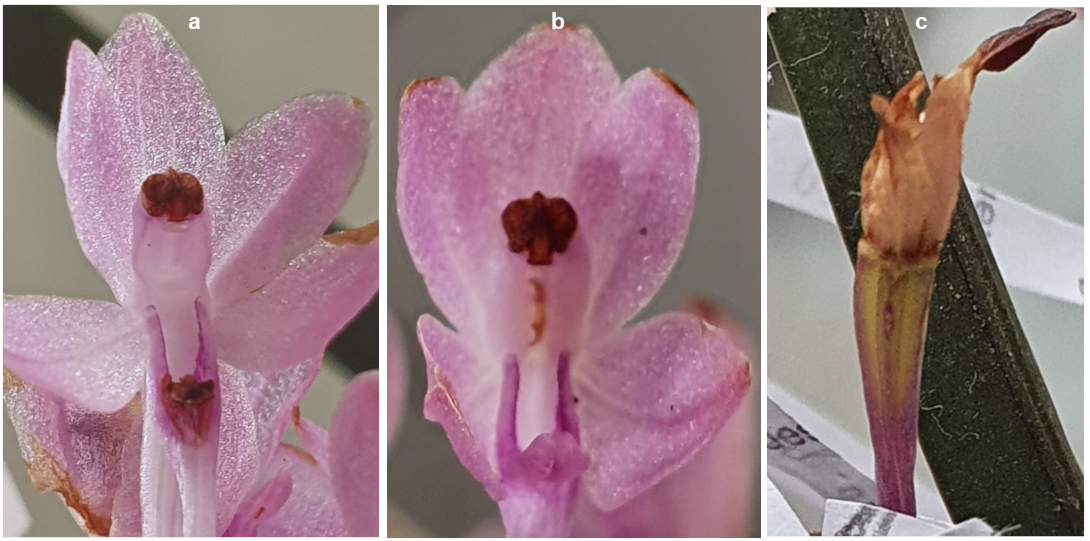
This file shows the changes of a Vanda christensoniana flower after pollination. Three developmental stages are shown. The first shows a fully open flower with an open stigmatic cavity (a), the second shows a pollinated flower with swollen column and a closed stigmatic cavity (b) and the third shows a developing capsule fruit and wilted sepals, petals and labellum (c).

== Description ==
It has a monopodial growth habit. The leaves are remarkable, as they are unusually purple for a Vanda. The purple foliage permits this plant to grow in full sun, as the accumulation of anthocyanins near the plant surface filters light and improves photoprotection. This feature is also strongly expressed in hybrids. The flowers are rose or purple to white and are produced on 2-4 relatively short, densely many-flowered inflorescences.

== Taxonomy ==
This species is closely related to Vanda malipoensis and Vanda nana. The phylogenetic tree based on the plastid genome (i.e. the maternal line) indicates, that it is separate from other section Ascocentrum species. Section Ascocentrum is shown to be in part paraphyletic, depending on which genetic material is examined. The nuclear genome results in different relationships. This inconsistency can be explained by hybrid speciation. This phylogenetic tree and the placement of Vanda christensoniana close to section Ascocentropsis, instead of section Ascocentrum, is confirmed in a second study.

- - sect. Ascocentropsis
    - Vanda nana
    - Vanda malipoensis
  - sect. Ascocentrum
    Vanda christensoniana
