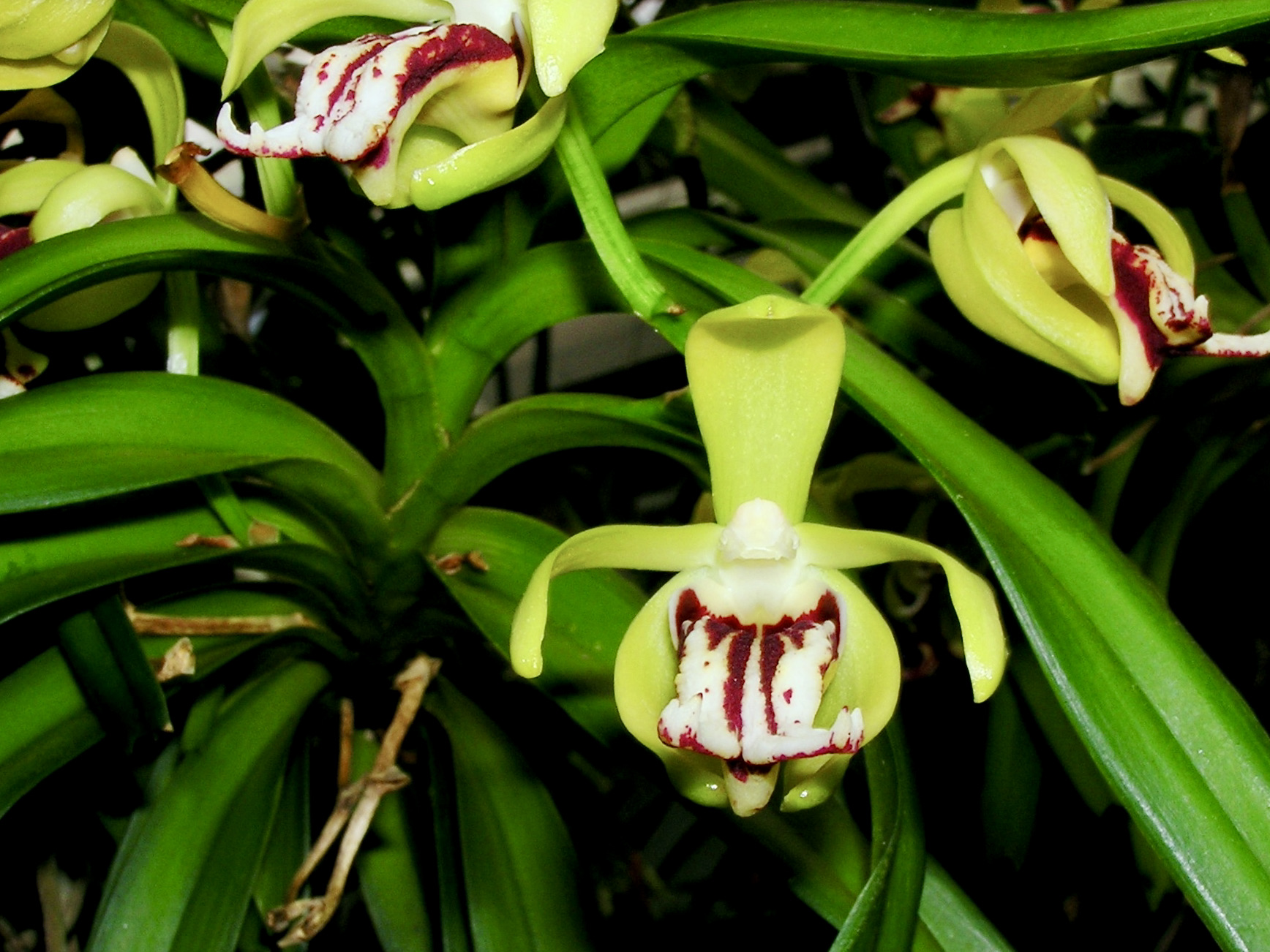

Scientific classification
- Kingdom: Plantae
- Clade: Tracheophytes
- Clade: Angiosperms
- Clade: Monocots
- Order: Asparagales
- Family: Orchidaceae
- Subfamily: Epidendroideae
- Genus: Vanda
- Species: V. cristata

Binomial name
- Vanda cristata Wall. ex Lindl.

Synonyms
- Aerides cristata (Wall. ex Lindl.) Wall. ex Hook.f.; Vanda striata Rchb.f.; Luisia striata (Rchb.f.) Kraenzl.; Trudelia cristata (Wall. ex Lindl.) Senghas

= Vanda cristata =

Species of orchid

Vanda cristata is a species of epiphytic orchid found growing in the Himalaya from Bangladesh, India, Nepal, Bhutan to China (northwestern Yunnan) at elevations of 600 – 2300 meters.

== Description ==
"Unlike most of the other epiphytic orchids, Vanda cristata have a single stem up to 60cm (24 inch) tall rising from a tuft of roots and do not have pseudobulbs. Thick, fleshy aerial roots are often produced on the stem and these may hang down the outside of the container in which the indoor Vanda cristata are planted.

The pale green leathery leaves which are strap shaped, grow all along the stem. The stem carry nearly opposite, arching, deeply channeled leaves 13-18cm (5-7 inch) long and 1-2cm (0.4-0.8 inch) wide, with slightly toothed, bunt tips. Flower stalks 10-15cm (4-6 inch) long appearing from the leaf axils in spring and summer bear up to seven waxy flowers about 5cm (2 inch) across. These flowers stalks can appear from between every third leaf or so. Each stalk produces several fragrant flowers which last for several weeks up to two months. Sepals and petals are yellowish green to creamy yellow. The short, oblong green-and-yellow lip has deep purple red lines near the base and is three-lobed."

== Taxonomy ==
Vanda cristata was collected in 1818 by Nathaniel Wallich in Nepal; He sent live plants to Kew Gardens in England. The first description was published in 1832 by John Lindley. The classification as Trudelia cristata in the genus Trudelia is considered synonymous with Vanda cristata, as Vanda striata

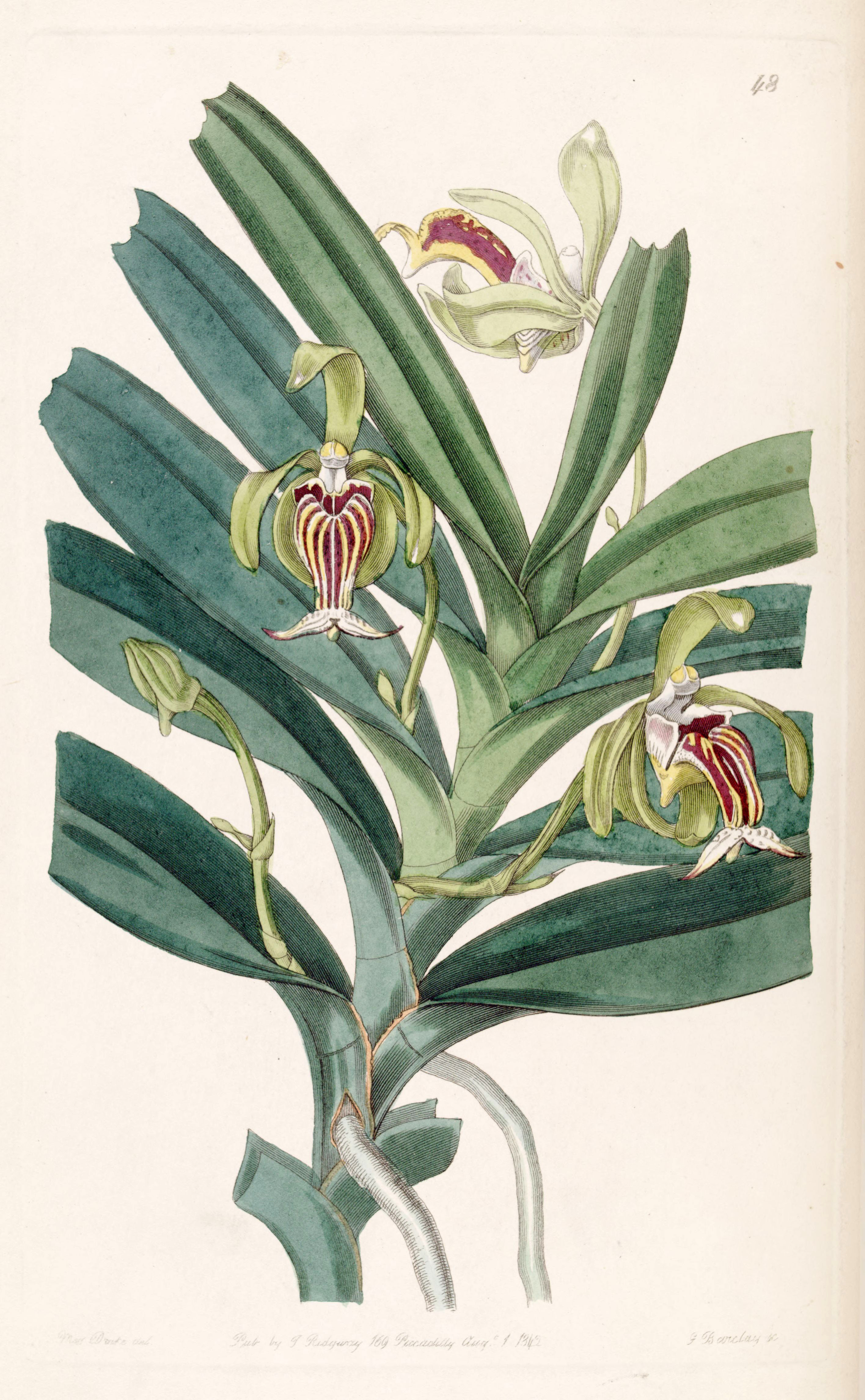
Vanda cristata plate 48 in: Edwards's Bot. Register (Orchidaceae), vol. 28, (1842)

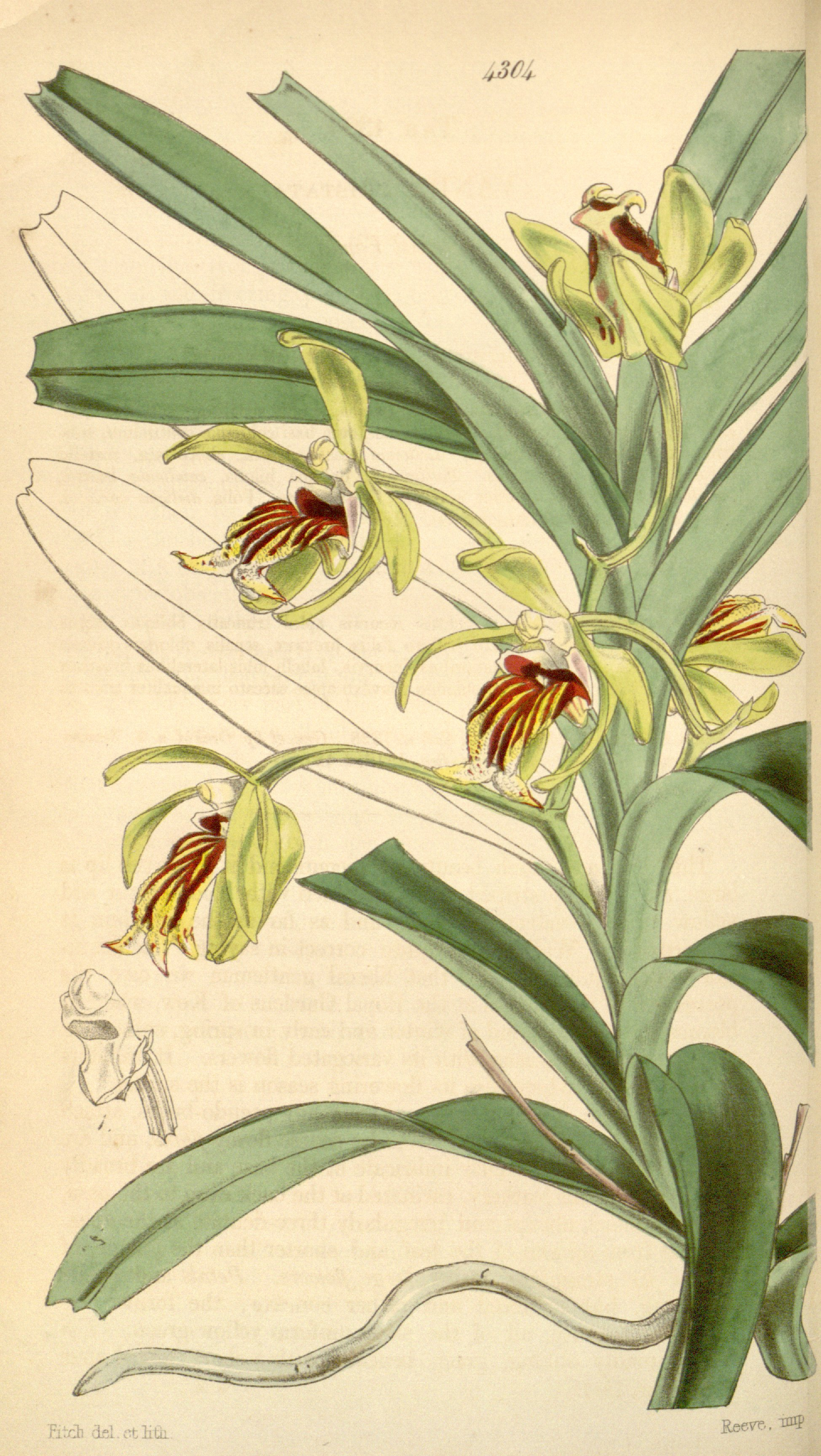
Vanda cristata plate 4304 in: Curtis's Bot. Magazine (Orchidaceae), vol. 73,(1847)

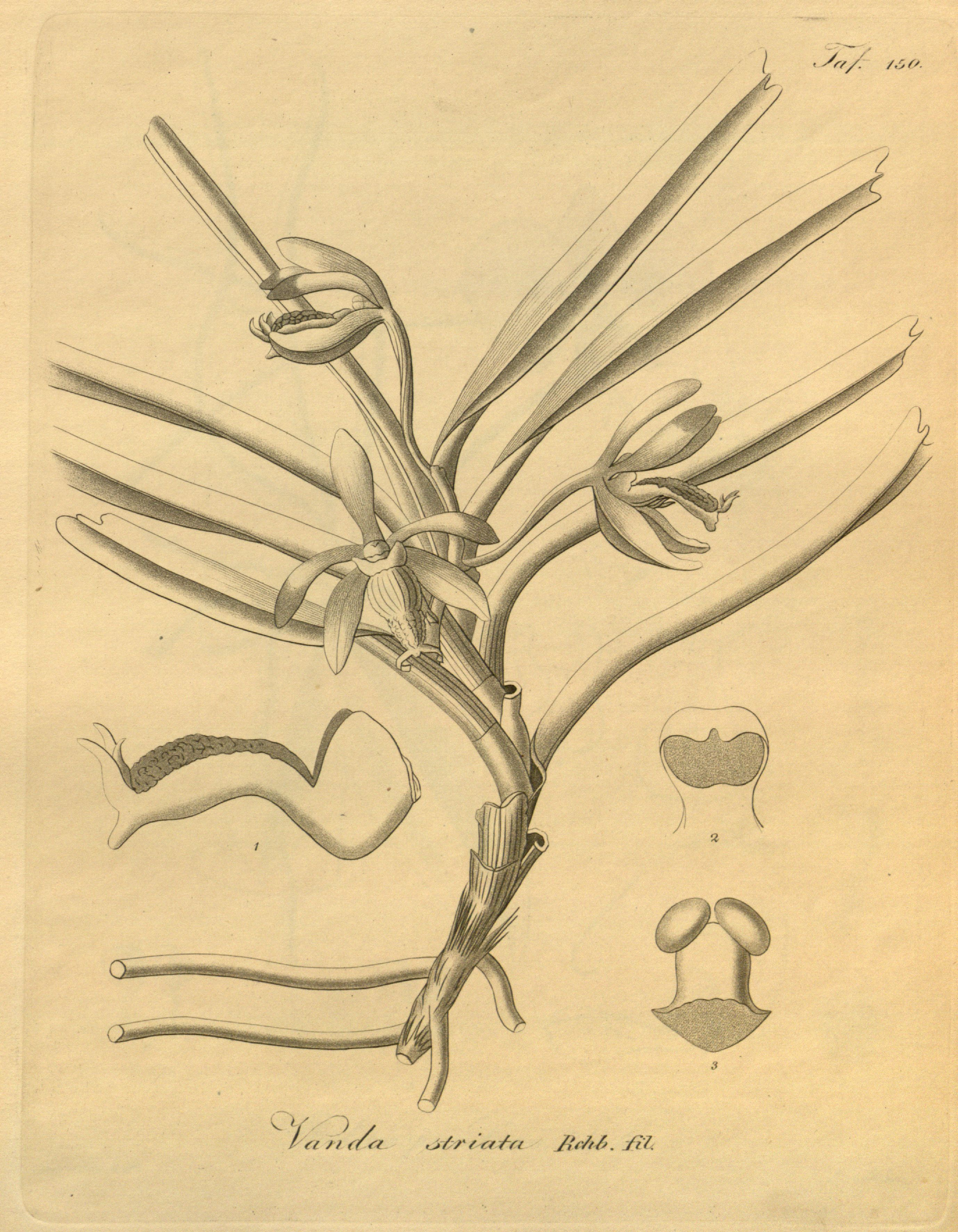
Vanda cristata (as syn. Vanda striata) plate 150 in: H. G. Reichenbach: Xenia orchidacea - vol. 2 (1874)

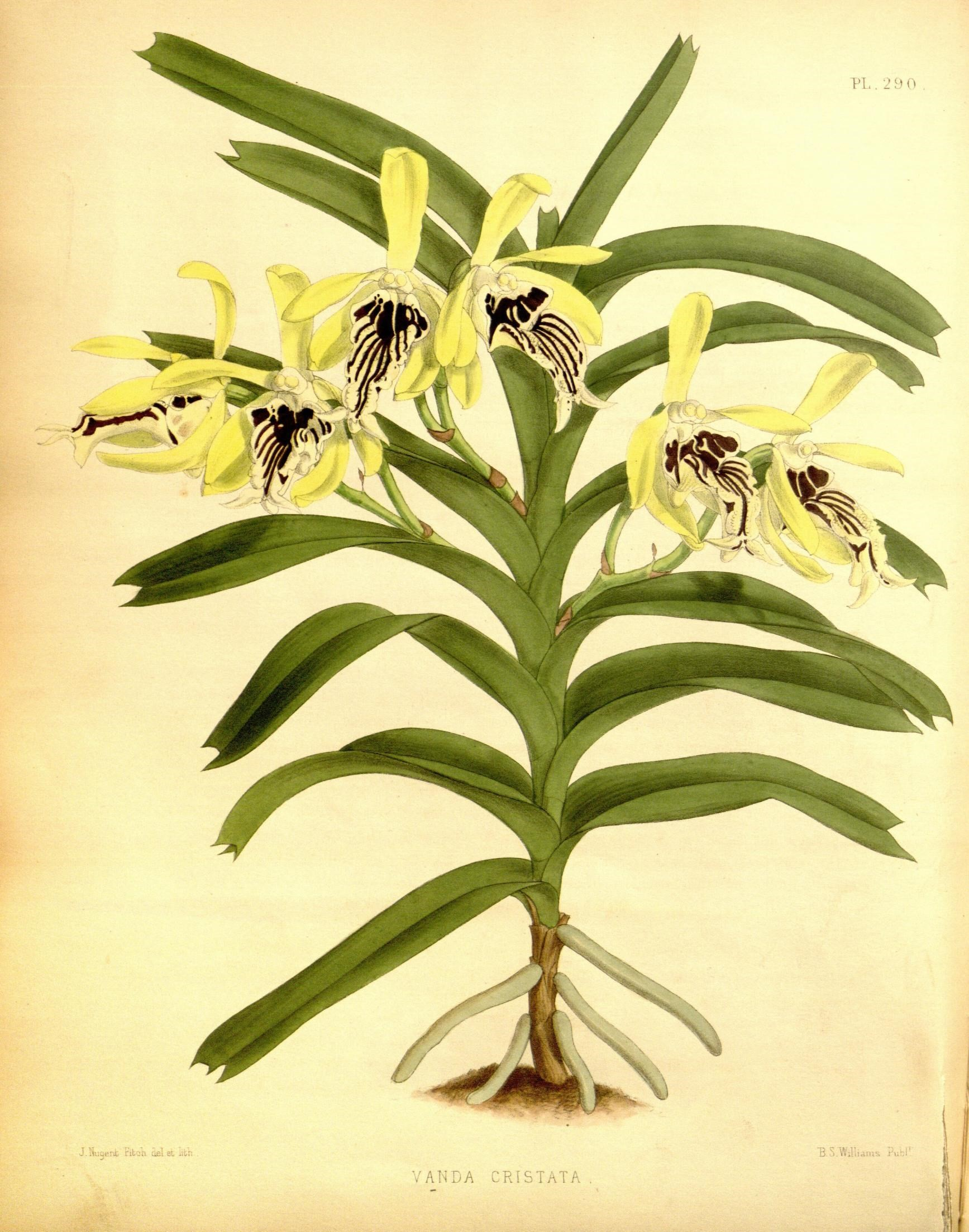
Vanda cristata Plate 290 in: R.Warner - B.S.Williams:The Orchid Album(1882-1897)
