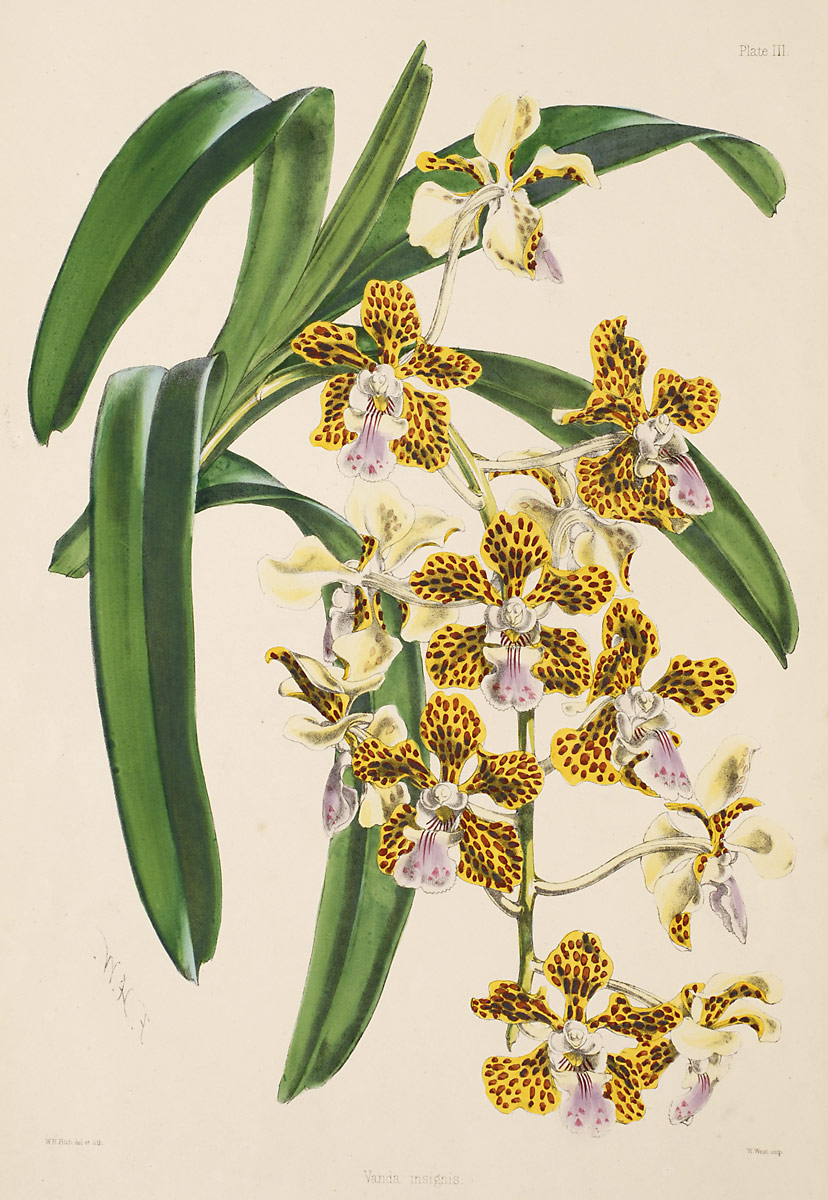
- Vanda insignis illustration

Conservation status
- Near Threatened (IUCN 3.1)

Scientific classification
- Kingdom: Plantae
- Clade: Tracheophytes
- Clade: Angiosperms
- Clade: Monocots
- Order: Asparagales
- Family: Orchidaceae
- Subfamily: Epidendroideae
- Genus: Vanda
- Species: V. insignis

Binomial name
- Vanda insignis Blume
- distribution of Vanda insignis

= Vanda insignis =

Species of orchid

Vanda insignis is a species of orchid endemic to the Lesser Sunda Islands.
