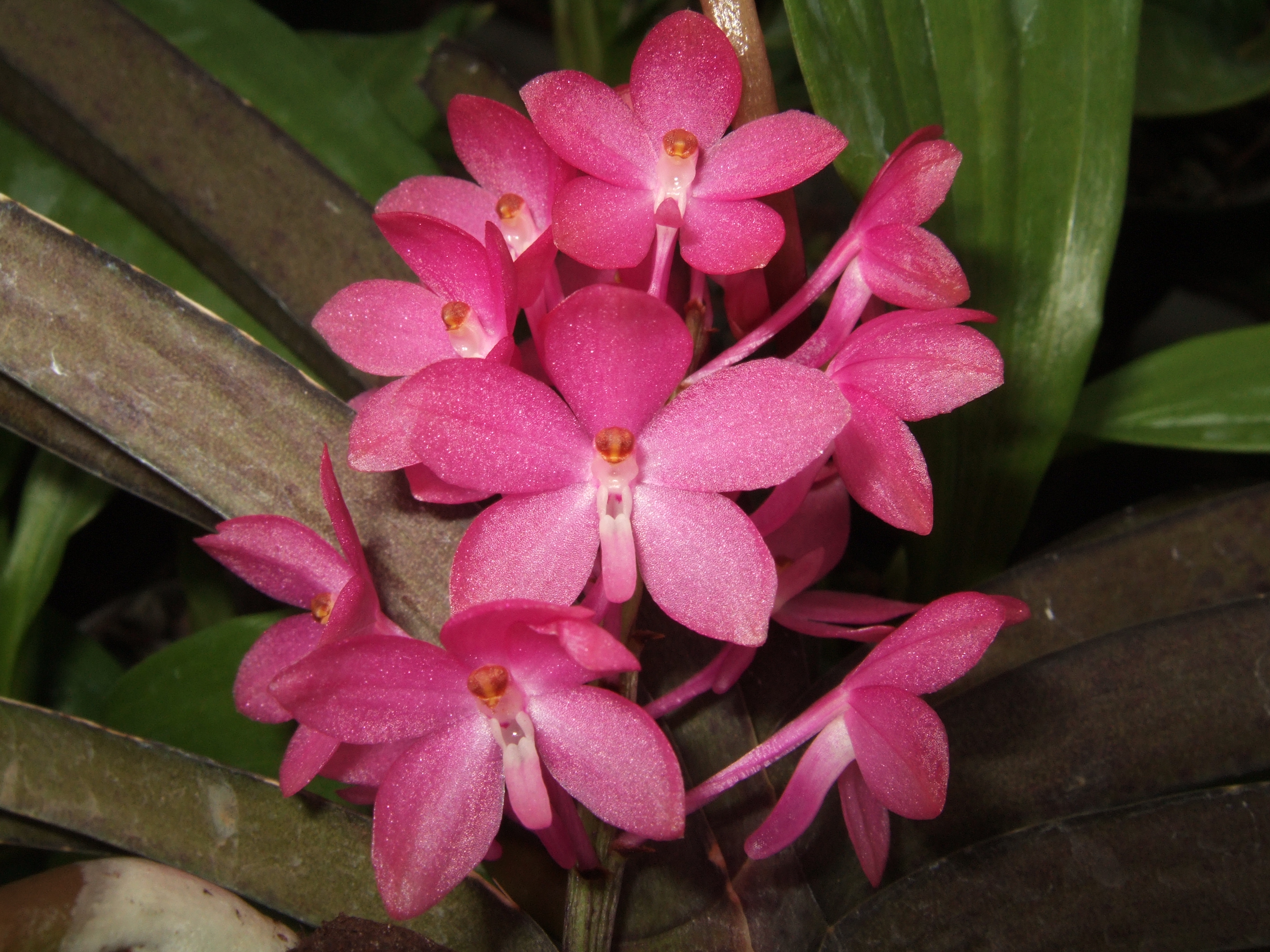

Scientific classification
- Kingdom: Plantae
- Clade: Tracheophytes
- Clade: Angiosperms
- Clade: Monocots
- Order: Asparagales
- Family: Orchidaceae
- Subfamily: Epidendroideae
- Genus: Vanda
- Species: V. ampullacea

Binomial name
- Vanda ampullacea (Roxb.) Schltr. (1914)

Synonyms
- Aerides ampullacea Roxb. (1832) (Basionym); Ascocentrum ampullaceum var. aurantiacum Pradhan (1979); Ascocentrum ampullaceum (Roxb.) Schltr. (1913); Gastrochilus ampullaceus (Roxb.) Kuntze (1891); Oeceoclades ampullacea (Roxb.) Lindl. ex Voigt (1845); Saccolabium ampullaceum (Roxb.) Lindl. ex Wall. (1832)

= Vanda ampullacea =

Species of orchid

Vanda ampullacea is a perennial epiphytic orchid found in southeast Asia from Nepal to China (southern Yunnan) and India, including the eastern Himalayas. It has had various classifications, initially called Aerides ampullacea by William Roxburgh when it was first described in 1814. It was most recently reclassified in 2012 during a taxonomic revision of Vanda. In 1868, one if its cultivars received a First Class Certificate from the Royal Horticultural Society.
