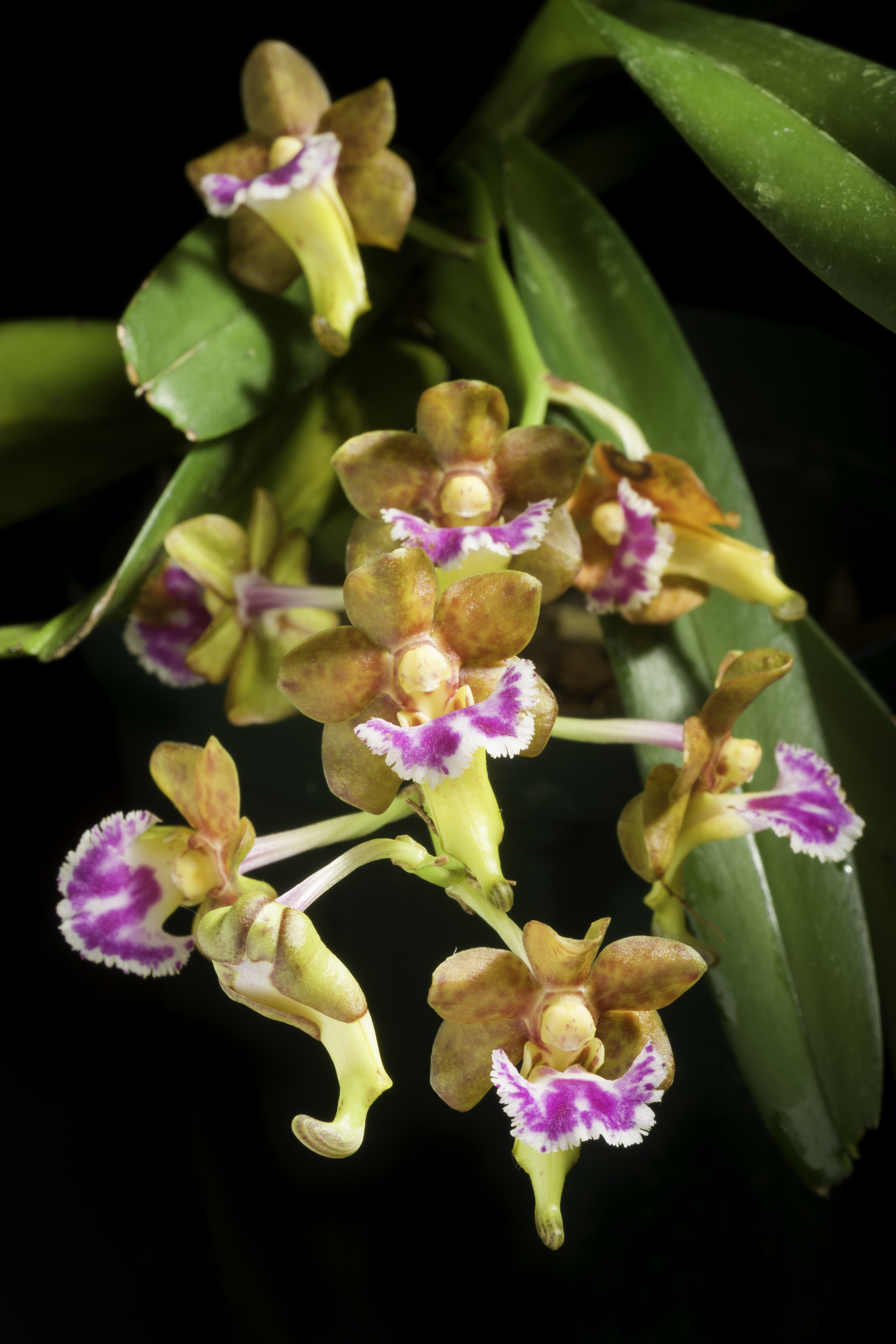

Scientific classification
- Kingdom: Plantae
- Clade: Tracheophytes
- Clade: Angiosperms
- Clade: Monocots
- Order: Asparagales
- Family: Orchidaceae
- Subfamily: Epidendroideae
- Genus: Vanda
- Species: V. flabellata

Binomial name
- Vanda flabellata (Rolfe ex Downie) Christenson

Synonyms
- Aerides flabellata Rolfe ex Downie

= Vanda flabellata =

Species of orchid

Vanda flabellata is a species of epiphytic orchid native to the Chinese province Yunnan, Laos, Vietnam and Thailand. It was erroneously reported to occur in Myanmar.
