= Vanda dives =

Scientific classification
- Kingdom: Plantae
- Clade: Tracheophytes
- Clade: Angiosperms
- Clade: Monocots
- Order: Asparagales
- Family: Orchidaceae
- Subfamily: Epidendroideae
- Genus: Vanda
- Species: V. dives

Binomial name
- Vanda dives (Rchb.f.) L.M.Gardiner
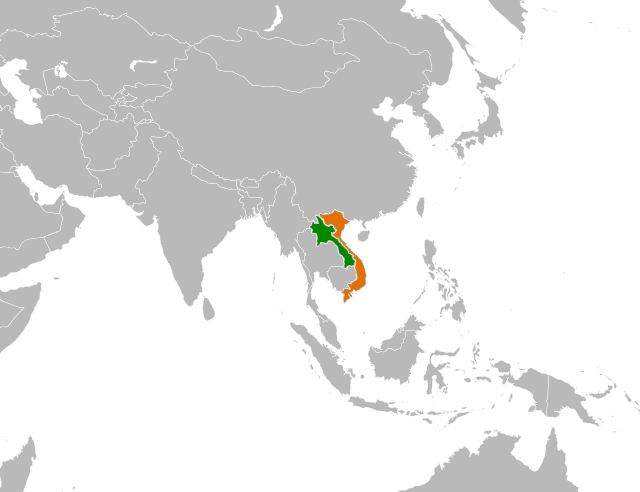
- distribution of Vanda dives

Synonyms
- Eparmatostigma dives (Rchb.f.) Garay; Saccolabium chrysoplectrum Guillaumin; Saccolabium dives Rchb.f.

Species of epiphytic orchid

Vanda dives is a species of epiphytic orchid native to Vietnam and Laos.

== Description ==
This species is very atypical for its genus. It is the sole representative of the section Eparmostigma within the genus Vanda. While the vegetative morphology does resemble other Vanda species, the generative morphology does not. Genetic evidence however confirms its position within the genus Vanda. These epiphytic herbs show pendent growth. Few linear leaves are produced on a short, compressed stem. The leaf apex is obliquely bilobed. Between April and May minute, white, moderately fleshy flowers with a relatively large, spurred labellum in relation to petals and sepals, are produced on densely many-flowered axillary racemes. The specific epithet dives is derived from Latin, meaning rich or wealthy. It refers to the many-flowered inflorescences. In Laos this species was found growing epiphytically in shaded forests on limestone hills at elevations of 650 m. In Vietnam it was found at elevations of 200 m in mixed, semi-deciduous forests. It was originally thought to be endemic to Vietnam.

== Conservation ==
This species is protected unter the CITES appendix II regulations of international trade. The conservation status in unknown.
