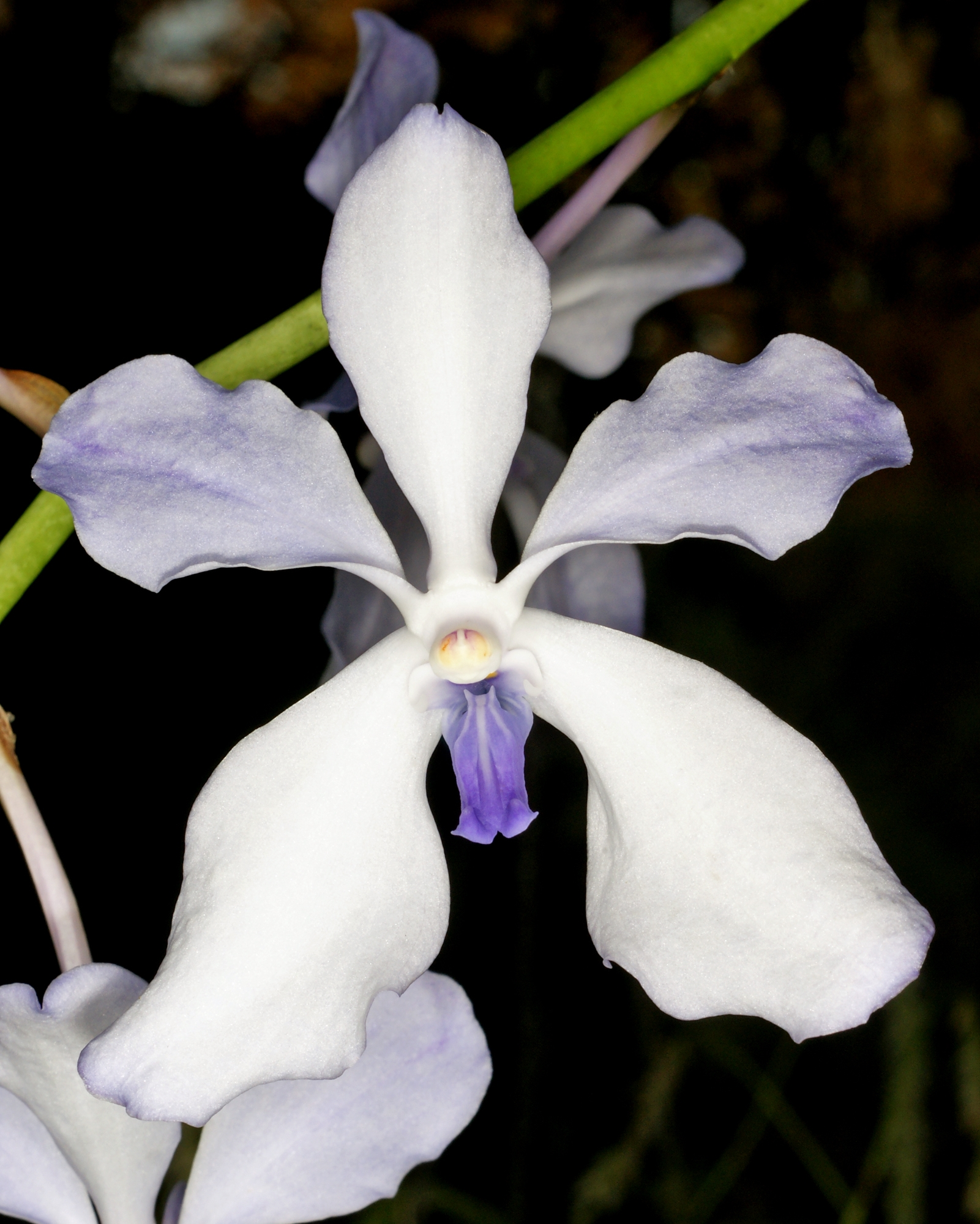
- Vanda coerulea

Scientific classification
- Kingdom: Plantae
- Clade: Tracheophytes
- Clade: Angiosperms
- Clade: Monocots
- Order: Asparagales
- Family: Orchidaceae
- Subfamily: Epidendroideae
- Tribe: Vandeae
- Subtribe: Aeridinae
- Genus: Vanda; Gaud. ex Pfitzer

Type species
- Vanda roxburghii R.Br.

Synonyms
- Ascocentrum Schltr.; Euanthe Schltr.; Finetia Schltr.; Neofinetia Hu; Nipponorchis Masam.; Eparmatostigma Garay; Trudelia Garay; × Trudelianda Garay; Christensonia Haager; Ascocentropsis Senghas & Schildh.; Gunnaria S.C.Chen ex Z.J.Liu & L.J.Chen

= Vanda =

Genus of orchids

Vanda is a genus of plants in the family Orchidaceae native to tropical and subtropical Asia to the northwestern Pacific, New Guinea, and Australia. It is highly prized in horticulture for its showy, fragrant, long-lasting, and intensely colorful flowers.

== Description ==
Vanda are epiphytic, monopodial herbs with ascending or rarely arching, usually rather long, stout, rigid stems with short internodes and many distichous leaves. Thick roots emerge from the lower part of the stem. The stems of these orchids vary considerably in size; some are miniature plants and some have a length of several meters. The plants can become quite massive in habitat and in cultivation, and epiphytic species possess very large, rambling aerial root systems. The roots have pneumatodes.

The few to many flattened flowers grow on a lateral inflorescence. Most show a yellow-brown color with brown markings, but they also appear in white, green, orange, red, and burgundy shades. The lip has a small spur. Vanda species usually bloom every few months and the flowers last for two to three weeks.

== Taxonomy ==
It was described by Robert Brown in 1821. The type species is Vanda roxburghii R.Br. In a recent molecular study of the genus Vanda, several genera including the former genus Ascocentrum, Neofinetia and Euanthe were brought into synonym with Vanda.

=== Etymology ===
The generic name Vanda is derived from the Sanskrit (वन्दाका) name for the species Vanda roxburghii (a synonym of Vanda tessellata).

=== Species ===
The following is a list of Vanda species recognised by Plants of the World Online as of January 2025 separated by sections:

Section	Image	Name	Year	Distribution	Elevation (m)
Section Ascocentrum Gardiner		Vanda ampullacea (Roxb.) L.M.Gardiner	1914	Nepal, China (southern Yunnan), India (Sikkim, Andaman Islands, Assam), Bangladesh, Bhutan, Myanmar, Thailand, Laos and Vietnam	300–1,500 metres (980–4,920 ft)
Section Ascocentrum Gardiner		Vanda aurantiaca (Schltr.) L.M.Gardiner	2012	Bali, Sulawesi and the Philippines	1,200 metres (3,900 ft)
Section Ascocentrum Gardiner		Vanda aurea (J.J.Sm.) L.M.Gardiner	2012	Maluku (Sula)	
Section Ascocentrum Gardiner		Vanda curvifolia (Lindl.) L.M.Gardiner	2012	India (Assam), Nepal, Myanmar, Thailand, Laos, southern China and Vietnam	0–700 metres (0–2,297 ft)
Section Ascocentrum Gardiner		Vanda garayi (Christenson) L.M.Gardiner	2012	Thailand, Cambodia and Vietnam	0–1,000 metres (0–3,281 ft)
Section Ascocentrum Gardiner		Vanda insularum (Christenson) L.M.Gardiner	2012	Maratua island to the east of Kalimantan, Borneo	
Section Ascocentrum Gardiner		Vanda karinae Motes	2021	India (Assam)	
Section Ascocentrum Gardiner		Vanda miniata (Lindl.) L.M.Gardiner	2012	Malaysia, Sumatra, Java and the Philippines	
Section Ascocentrum Gardiner		Vanda rubra (Lindl.) L.M.Gardiner	2012	Myanmar, Vietnam	
Section Ascocentropsis Gardiner		Vanda christensoniana (Haager) L.M.Gardiner	1993	Vietnam	0–700 metres (0–2,297 ft)
Section Ascocentropsis Gardiner		Vanda hienii (Aver. & V.C.Nguyen) R.Rice	2019	Vietnam (Cao Bang)	1,300 metres (4,300 ft)
Section Ascocentropsis Gardiner		Vanda malipoensis L.H.Zou, Jiu X.Huang & Z.J.Liu	2014	China (Yunnan)	
Section Ascocentropsis Gardiner		Vanda nana L.M.Gardiner	2012	Thailand, Vietnam and Cambodia	
Section Cristatae Lindl.		Vanda alpina (Lindl.) Lindl.	1853	India (Assam, Sikkim), Nepal, Bhutan, China (Yunnan)	1,200–2,000 metres (3,900–6,600 ft)
Section Cristatae Lindl.		Vanda chlorosantha (Garay) Christenson	1992	Bhutan	
Section Cristatae Lindl.		Vanda cristata Wall. ex Lindl.	1828	Bangladesh, India, Nepal, Pakistan, Bhutan, China (Yunnan, Xizang)	600–2,300 metres (2,000–7,500 ft)
Section Cristatae Lindl.		Vanda flavobrunnea Rchb.f.	1886	India(Sikkim), Bhutan, Nepal, Myanmar, China, Vietnam, Laos, Thailand and Sumatra	700–1,400 metres (2,300–4,600 ft)
Section Cristatae Lindl.		Vanda griffithii Lindl.	1851	Nepal, Bhutan	1,500–1,800 metres (4,900–5,900 ft)
Section Cristatae Lindl.		Vanda jainii A.S.Chauhan	1984	India (Assam)	
Section Cristatae Lindl.		Vanda longitepala D.L.Roberts, L.M.Gardiner & Motes	2008 publ. 2009	Myanmar	1,200–1,500 metres (3,900–4,900 ft)
Section Cristatae Lindl.		Vanda sathishii Motes	2022	India (Kerala)	
Section Dactylolobatae W. Suarez & Cootes, Philipp		Vanda aliceae Motes, L.M.Gardiner & D.L.Roberts	2015	Bacan Island, North Moluccas	
Section Dactylolobatae W. Suarez & Cootes, Philipp		Vanda celebica Rolfe	1899	Indonesia (Sulawesi)	500–600 metres (1,600–2,000 ft)
Section Dactylolobatae W. Suarez & Cootes, Philipp		Vanda crassiloba Teijsm. & Binn. ex J.J.Sm.	1905	Maluku (Ambon, Seram)	
Section Dactylolobatae W. Suarez & Cootes, Philipp		Vanda frankieana Metusala & P.O'Byrne	2011	Borneo (Kalimantan)	
Section Dactylolobatae W. Suarez & Cootes, Philipp		Vanda gibbsiae Rolfe	1914	Borneo	800–1,100 metres (2,600–3,600 ft)
Section Dactylolobatae W. Suarez & Cootes, Philipp		Vanda hastifera Rchb.f.	1877	Borneo	600–1,200 metres (2,000–3,900 ft)
Section Dactylolobatae W. Suarez & Cootes, Philipp		Vanda lindenii Rchb.f.	1886	New Guinea	
Section Dactylolobatae W. Suarez & Cootes, Philipp		Vanda mindanaoensis Motes, L.M.Gardiner & D.L.Roberts	2015	Philippines (Mindanao)	500 metres (1,600 ft)
Section Dactylolobatae W. Suarez & Cootes, Philipp		Vanda saxatilis J.J.Sm.	1926	Buru Islands, Maluku, Indonesia	
Section Dactylolobatae W. Suarez & Cootes, Philipp		Vanda scandens Holttum	1950	Philippines ( Mindanao, Palawan)	
Section Deltoglossa Christenson		Vanda arcuata J.J.Sm.	1907	Indonesia - Sulawesi	
Section Deltoglossa Christenson		Vanda bartholomewii Motes	2021	Maluku	
Section Deltoglossa Christenson		Vanda chirayupiniae Wannakr.	1894	Malaysia, the Philippines	1,500 metres (4,900 ft)
Section Deltoglossa Christenson		Vanda cootesii Motes	2016	Philippines (Mindano)	400–1,500 metres (1,300–4,900 ft)
Section Deltoglossa Christenson		Vanda dearei Rchb.f.	1886	Borneo	0–300 metres (0–984 ft)
Section Deltoglossa Christenson		Vanda devoogtii J.J.Sm.	1932	Sulawesi	
Section Deltoglossa Christenson		Vanda emilyae Motes	2021	Papua New Guinea to Bismarck Archipelago.	
Section Deltoglossa Christenson		Vanda floresensis Motes	2021	Lesser Sunda Islands (Flores)	
Section Deltoglossa Christenson		Vanda foetida J.J.Sm.	1906	S. Sumatra	
Section Deltoglossa Christenson		Vanda furva (L.) Lindl.	1905	Java, Maluku	100–600 metres (330–1,970 ft)
Section Deltoglossa Christenson		Vanda helvola Blume	1849	Java, Sumatra, Borneo and western Malaysia, Philippines	400–1,500 metres (1,300–4,900 ft)
Section Deltoglossa Christenson		Vanda hindsii Lindl.	1843	Papuasia, Australia (N. Queensland)	0–450 metres (0–1,476 ft)
Section Deltoglossa Christenson		Vanda insignis Blume ex Lindl.	1849	Lesser Sunda Is., Malaysia, the Moluccas	
Section Deltoglossa Christenson		Vanda jennae P.O'Byrne & J.J.Verm.	2005	Sulawesi	
Section Deltoglossa Christenson		Vanda limbata Blume	1849	Java, Lesser Sunda Is., the Philippines (Mindanao)	3–700 metres (9.8–2,296.6 ft)
Section Deltoglossa Christenson		Vanda lombokensis J.J.Sm.	1925	Lesser Sunda (Lombok Island)	1,200 metres (3,900 ft)
Section Deltoglossa Christenson		Vanda luzonica Loher ex Rolfe	1915	Philippines (Luzon)	500 metres (1,600 ft)
Section Deltoglossa Christenson		Vanda mariae Motes	2016	Philippines (Mindanao)	
Section Deltoglossa Christenson		Vanda merrillii Ames & Quisumb.	1932	Philippines (Luzon)	500 metres (1,600 ft)
Section Deltoglossa Christenson		Vanda metusalae P.O'Byrne & J.J.Verm.	2008	Moluccas, Sulawesi	100–600 metres (330–1,970 ft)
Section Deltoglossa Christenson		Vanda perplexa Motes & D.L.Roberts	2013	Komodo Island of the Lesser Sunda Islands	
Section Deltoglossa Christenson		Vanda punctata Ridl.	1923	Lesser Sunda Islands (Tanimbar Islands)	
Section Deltoglossa Christenson		Vanda suavis Lindl.	1848	Java	
Section Deltoglossa Christenson		Vanda sumatrana Schltr.	1911	Sumatra	300–1,000 metres (980–3,280 ft)
Section Deltoglossa Christenson		Vanda tricolor Lindl.	1849	Laos, Java, Bali	700–1,600 metres (2,300–5,200 ft)
Section Deltoglossa Christenson		Vanda ustii Golamco, Claustro & de Mesa	2000	Philippines (Luzon)	1,250 metres (4,100 ft)
Section Eparmatostigma Gardiner		Vanda dives (Rchb.f.) L.M.Gardiner	2012	Vietnam, Laos	
Section Flabellatae Gardiner		Vanda flabellata (Rolfe ex Downie) Christenson	1985	Thailand, Myanmar, China (Yunnan)	200–1,700 metres (660–5,580 ft)
Section Flabellatae Gardiner		Vanda lilacina Teijsm. & Binn.	1862	China (Yunnan), Thailand and Laos	100–1,000 metres (330–3,280 ft)
Section Flabellatae Gardiner		Vanda vietnamica (Haager) L.M.Gardiner	2012	Vietnam	0–700 metres (0–2,297 ft)
Section Lamellaria Lindl.		Vanda barnesii W.E.Higgins & Motes	2012	Philippines (North Luzon)	1,200–1,600 metres (3,900–5,200 ft)
Section Lamellaria Lindl.		Vanda javierae D.Tiu ex Fessel & Lückel	1984	Philippines (Luzon)	1,200 metres (3,900 ft)
Section Lamellaria Lindl.		Vanda lamellata Lindl.	1838	Taiwan, Ryukyu Islands, Philippines, Borneo (Sabah), and the Marianas Islands	0–300 metres (0–984 ft)
Section Lamellaria Lindl.		Vanda roeblingiana Rolfe	1894	peninsular Malaysia, the Philippines (Luzon)	
Section Lamellaria Lindl.		Vanda sanderiana (Rchb.f.) Rchb.f.	1882	Philippines (Mindanao)	0–500 metres (0–1,640 ft)
Section Neofinetia Gardiner		Vanda falcata (Thunb.) Beer	1854	Japan, China (Fujian, S Gansu, SW Hubei, W Jiangxi, Sichuan, Zhejiang), Korea and the Ryukyu Islands	1,500–1,600 metres (4,900–5,200 ft)
Section Longicalcarata Christenson		Vanda coerulea Griff. ex Lindl.	1847	China (Yunnan), India(Assam, Nagaland, Meghalaya), Myanmar and Thailand	800–1,700 metres (2,600–5,600 ft)
Section Longicalcarata Christenson		Vanda coerulescens Griff.	1851	India(Assam, Arunachal Pradesh), China (Yunnan), Myanmar, Thailand	300–1,200 metres (980–3,940 ft)
Section Obtusiloba Christenson		Vanda bicolor Griff.	1851	India (Assam), Bhutan and Myanmar	700–2,000 metres (2,300–6,600 ft)
Section Obtusiloba Christenson		Vanda brunnea Rchb.f.	1868	India, Myanmar, Thailand, China (Yunnan)	800–1,550 metres (2,620–5,090 ft)
Section Obtusiloba Christenson		Vanda denisoniana Benson & Rchb.f.	1869	China (Yunnan), Myanmar, Thailand, Laos and Vietnam	450–1,200 metres (1,480–3,940 ft)
Section Obtusiloba Christenson		Vanda gardinerae Motes	2021	Thailand.	
Section Obtusiloba Christenson		Vanda vipanii Rchb.f.	1882	Myanmar	
Section Testacea Gardiner		Vanda bensonii Bateman	1866	India (Assam), Myanmar and Thailand	
Section Testacea Gardiner		Vanda funingensis L.H.Zou & Z.J.Liu	2016	China (Yunnan)	
Section Testacea Gardiner		Vanda liouvillei Finet	1912	India (Assam), Cambodia, Myanmar, Thailand and Laos	
Section Testacea Gardiner		Vanda parviflora Lindl.	1844	Myanmar and Thailand	780–2,000 metres (2,560–6,560 ft)
Section Testacea Gardiner		Vanda testacea (Lindl.) Rchb.f.	1877	Myanmar, Sri Lanka, India(Assam), China, Nepal and Bhutan	780–2,000 metres (2,560–6,560 ft)
Section Vanda		Vanda bidupensis Aver. & Christenson	1998	Vietnam	1,450–1,750 metres (4,760–5,740 ft)
Section Vanda		Vanda concolor Blume	1849	China (Guangxi, Guizhou and Yunnan), Vietnam	700–1,600 metres (2,300–5,200 ft)
Section Vanda		Vanda esquirolii Schltr.	1921	China (SW. Guizhou, Guangxi), Laos, Vietnam	
Section Vanda		Vanda fuscoviridis Lindl.	1848	China (Guangdong) to Vietnam	
Section Vanda		Vanda gracilis Aver.	2015	Vietnam	200–250 metres (660–820 ft)
Section Vanda		Vanda hennisiana Ormerod & Kurzweil	2022	Myanmar, Vietnam	
Section Vanda		Vanda motesiana Choltco	2009	India (Arunachal Pradesh )	
Section Vanda		Vanda tessellata (Roxb.) Hook. ex G.Don	1830	China (Yunnan), India (Assam), Bangladesh, Nepal, Sri Lanka, and Myanmar	1,500 metres (4,900 ft)
Section Vanda		Vanda thwaitesii Hook.f.	1898	India (Kerala, Karnataka), Sri Lanka	800–1,000 metres (2,600–3,300 ft)
Section Vanda		Vanda wightii Rchb.f.	1864	India(Karnataka, Kerala) and Sri Lanka	

=== Natural hybrids ===
- Vanda × amoena O'Brien (V. coerulea × V. tessellata) (Assam)
- Vanda × boumaniae J.J.Sm. (V. insignis × V. perplexa) (Lesser Sunda Is.)
- Vanda × charlesworthii Rolfe (V. bensonii × V. coerulea) (Myanmar)
- Vanda × feliciae Cootes (V. lamellata var. boxallii × V. ustii) (Philippines (Luzon))
- Vanda × hebraica Motes & L.M.Gardiner & D.L.Roberts (V. denisoniana × V. brunnea) (Myanmar)
- Vanda × leucostele Schltr. (V. foetida × V. helvola) (Sumatera)
- Vanda × loii Motes (V. lamellata × V. merrillii) (Philippines)
- Vanda × peetersiana (Cogn.) André (V. coerulea × V. coerulescens) (Assam)

== Distribution and habitat ==
These mostly epiphytic, but sometimes lithophytic or terrestrial orchids, are distributed in India, Himalaya, Southeast Asia, Indonesia, the Philippines, New Guinea, southern China, and northern Australia.

== Ecology ==
Vanda falcata is pollinated by hawkmoth species of the genus Theretra, namely Theretra japonica and Theretra nessus.

== Conservation ==
Many Vanda orchids, particularly V. coerulea, are endangered. These species have never been common in the wild and are typically encountered only infrequently in their natural habitats. They grow mainly in disturbed forest areas with high light levels and are therefore especially vulnerable to habitat destruction. The export of wild-collected specimens of the blue orchid (V. coerulea) and other wild Vanda species is prohibited worldwide, as all orchids are listed in Appendix II of the Convention on International Trade in Endangered Species.

== Cultivation ==
This genus is one of the five most horticulturally important orchid genera. Its species are valued for their flowers, and many are important in hybridization and the cut flower market. V. coerulea is notable for its blue flowers, a coloration that is unusual in the botanical world. It is also highly valued in breeding and has contributed to numerous interspecific and intergeneric hybrids.

=== Fungal infections ===
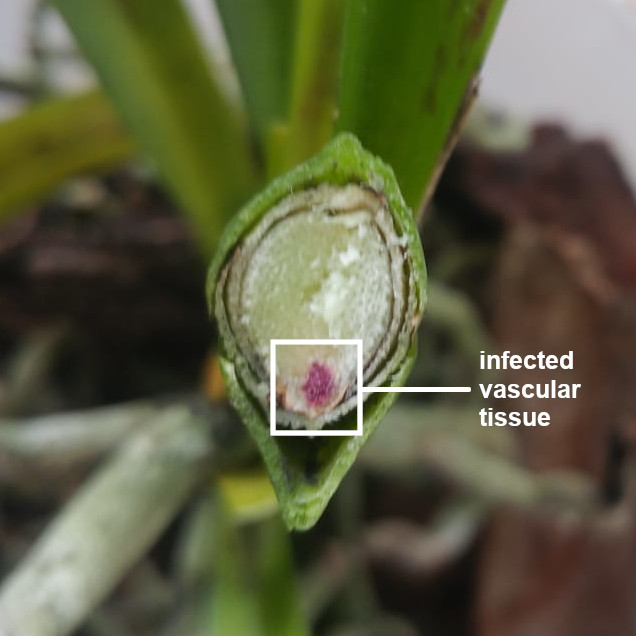
Cross section of Vanda stem infected with Fusarium, exhibiting typical purple spotting of vascular tissue

Unfortunately fungal infections are not uncommon in cultivated plants. A variety of phytopathogens may infect Vanda orchids. Vandas may be affected by Fusarium wilt. This disease is characterized by purple discolouration in the vascular tissue, which results in the loss of their function. The hyphae and spores block the conductor vessels. Affected plants may superficially appear healthy, as they continue to grow, the oldest parts of the plants can be affected and the disease will eventually progress throughout the entire plant. If cutting tools are not sterilized the infection may spread to other plants.
