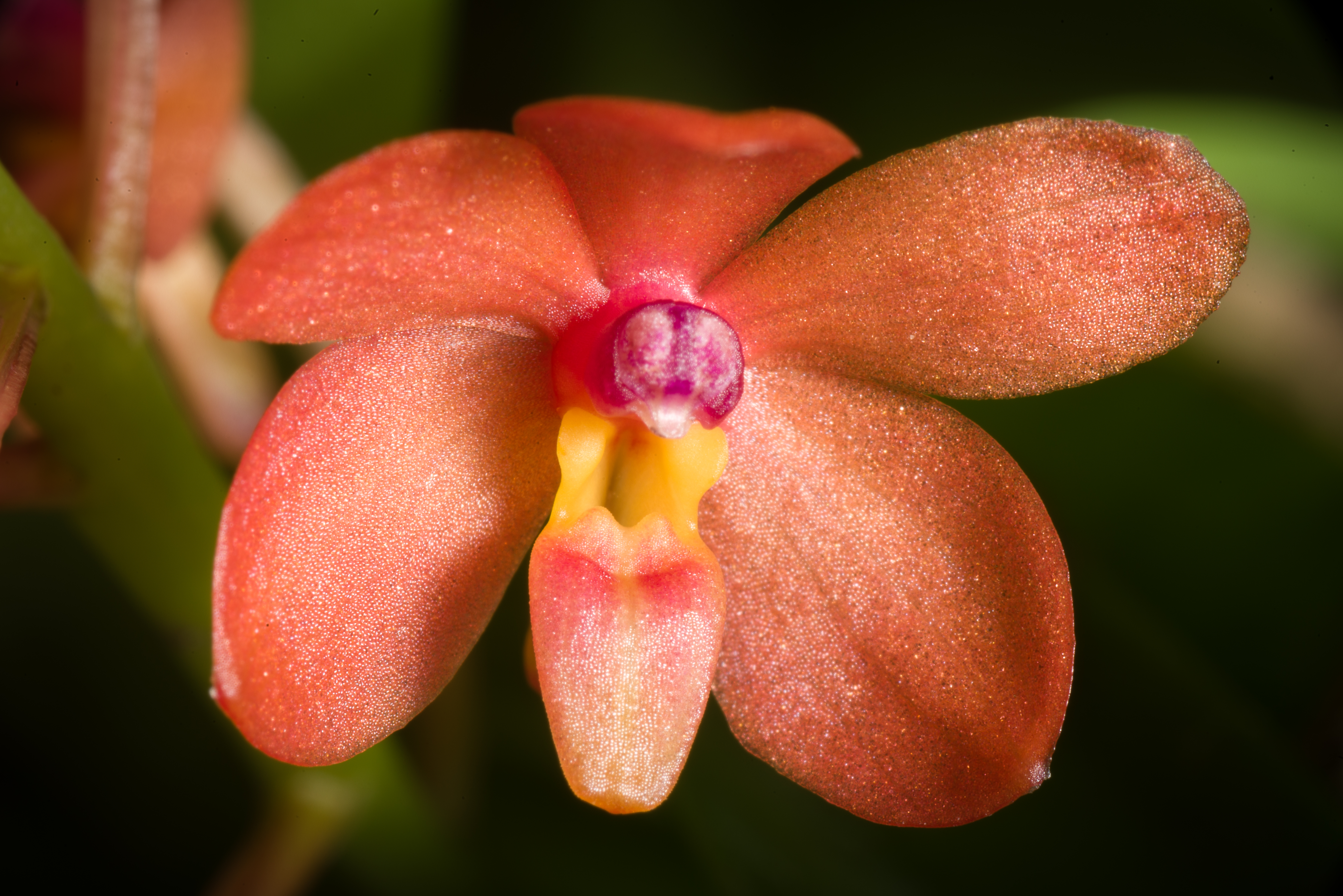

Conservation status
- CITES Appendix II

Scientific classification
- Kingdom: Plantae
- Clade: Tracheophytes
- Clade: Angiosperms
- Clade: Monocots
- Order: Asparagales
- Family: Orchidaceae
- Subfamily: Epidendroideae
- Genus: Vanda
- Species: V. curvifolia

Binomial name
- Vanda curvifolia (Lindl.) L.M.Gardiner

Synonyms
- Saccolabium curvifolium Lindl.; Saccolabium miniatum Hook.; Saccolabium curvifolium var. luteum B.S.Williams; Gastrochilus curvifolius (Lindl.) Kuntze; Ascocentrum curvifolium (Lindl.) Schltr.; Ascocentrum curvifolium f. luteum (B.S.Williams) Christenson; Vanda curvifolia f. franksmithiana Koop.

= Vanda curvifolia =

Species of orchid

Vanda curvifolia is a species of orchid native to East Himalaya, Myanmar, and Thailand.
