= Vanda limbata =

Scientific classification
- Kingdom: Plantae
- Clade: Tracheophytes
- Clade: Angiosperms
- Clade: Monocots
- Order: Asparagales
- Family: Orchidaceae
- Subfamily: Epidendroideae
- Genus: Vanda
- Species: V. limbata

Binomial name
- Vanda limbata Blume

Species of orchid

Vanda limbata is a species of orchid native to Java, the Lesser Sunda Islands and the Philippines.
