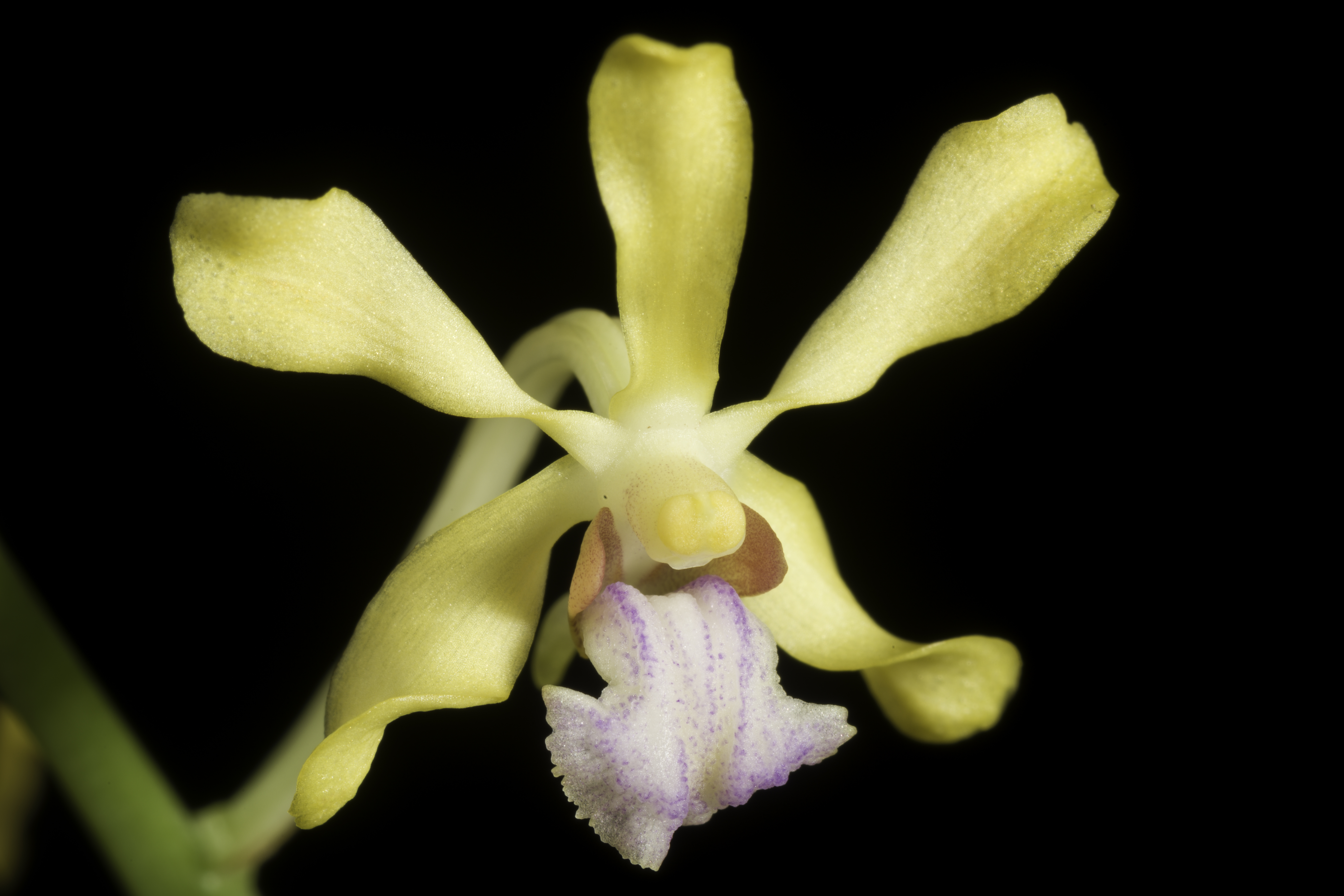

Scientific classification
- Kingdom: Plantae
- Clade: Tracheophytes
- Clade: Angiosperms
- Clade: Monocots
- Order: Asparagales
- Family: Orchidaceae
- Subfamily: Epidendroideae
- Genus: Vanda
- Species: V. testacea

Binomial name
- Vanda testacea (Lindl.) Rchb.f. (1877)

Synonyms
- Aerides testaceum (Lindl.) Rchb.f. 1830-40; Aerides wightiamum (Lindl.) 1824; Aerides wrightianum (Lindl.)ex Wall. 1832; Vanda parviflora Lindl. 1844; Vanda testacea Rchb.f. 1877; Vanda vitellina Kraenzl. 1892

= Vanda testacea =

Species of orchid

Vanda testacea is a species of orchid occurring from the Indian subcontinent to Indochina at the elevations of 500 to 2000 meters. It is an epiphytic perennial. It flowers in 6–20 flowered racemes; flowers range in size from 1 to 1.5 cm. Flowers are yellow with a blue lip.

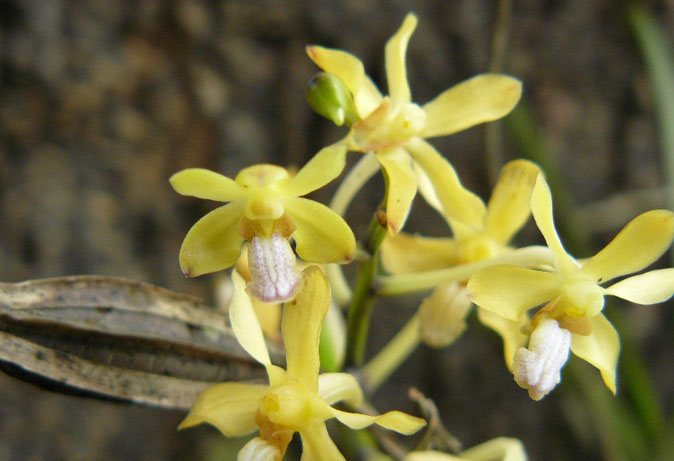
a location variant from Kerala, South India

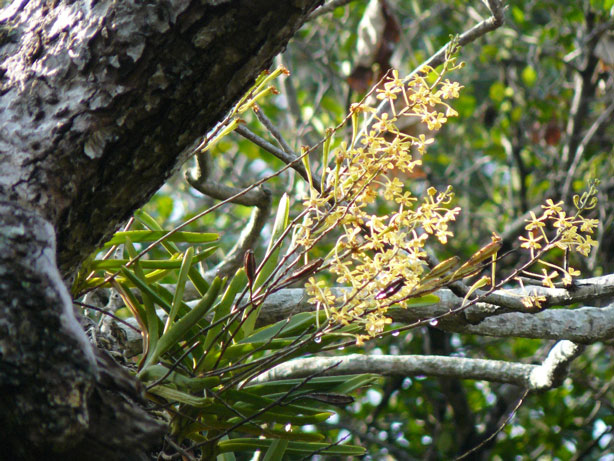
blooming in a tree, South India

Vanda testacea
