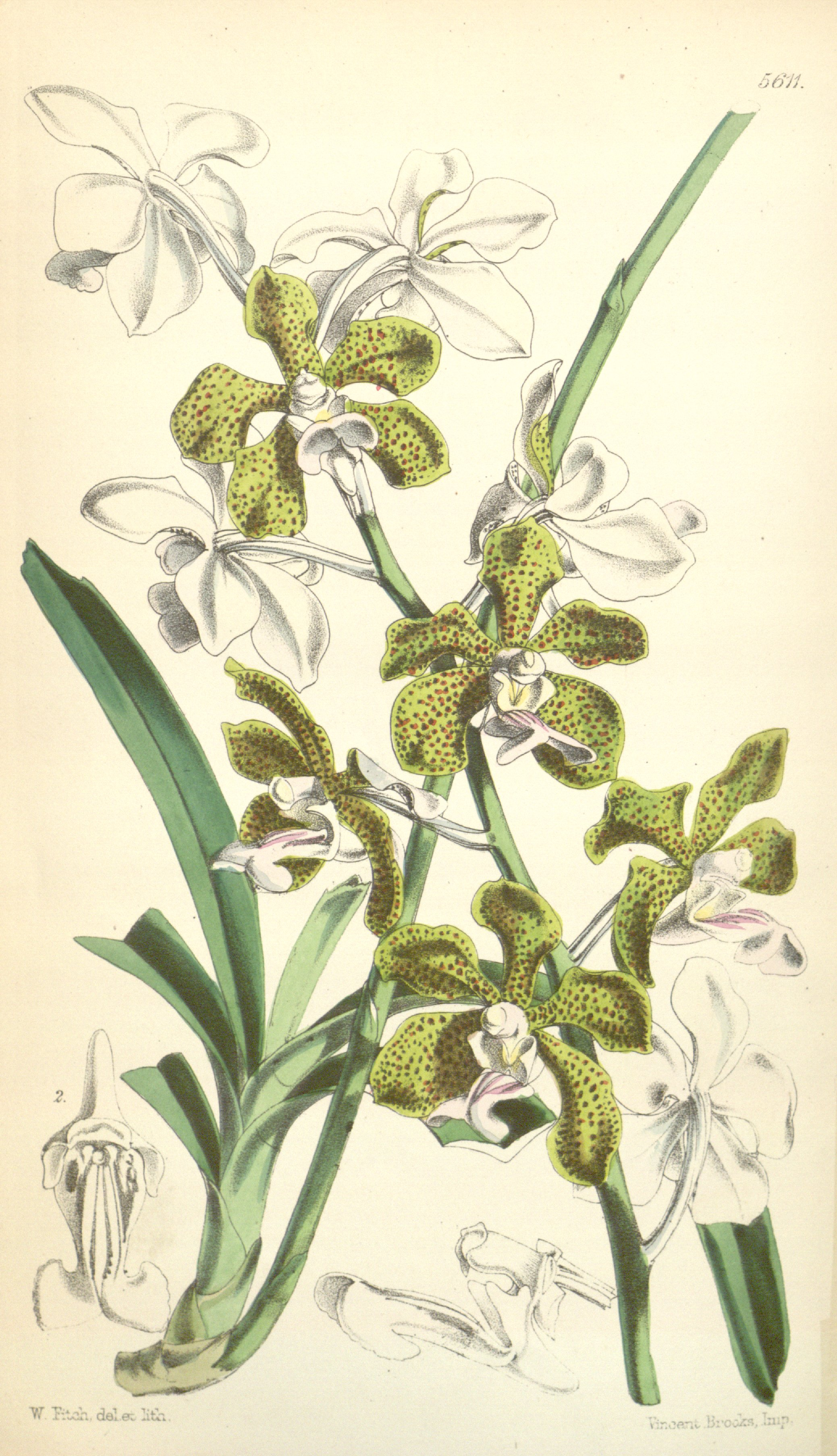
- Vanda bensonii illustration

Scientific classification
- Kingdom: Plantae
- Clade: Tracheophytes
- Clade: Angiosperms
- Clade: Monocots
- Order: Asparagales
- Family: Orchidaceae
- Subfamily: Epidendroideae
- Genus: Vanda
- Species: V. bensonii

Binomial name
- Vanda bensonii Bateman

= Vanda bensonii =

Species of orchid

Vanda bensonii is a species of orchid found from Assam to Thailand.
