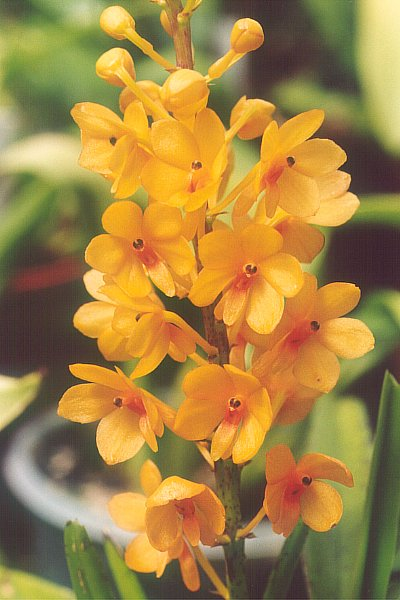

Scientific classification
- Kingdom: Plantae
- Clade: Tracheophytes
- Clade: Angiosperms
- Clade: Monocots
- Order: Asparagales
- Family: Orchidaceae
- Subfamily: Epidendroideae
- Genus: Vanda
- Species: V. miniatum

Binomial name
- Vanda miniatum (Lindl.) L.M.Gardiner

Synonyms
- Ascocentrum miniatum (Lindl.) Schltr.; Saccolabium miniatum Lindl.; Gastrochilus miniatus (Lindl.) Kuntze

= Vanda miniata =

Rust-red ascocentrum

Species of orchid

Vanda miniata, the rust-red ascocentrum, is a species of orchid found in Assam, Laos, Thailand, Vietnam, Java, Malaysia, Philippines, Sumatra. It was formerly known as Ascocentrum miniatum and was the type species of the genus Ascocentrum, now synonymous with Vanda.
