= Blue Orchid (disambiguation) =

"Blue Orchid" is a song by the White Stripes.

Blue orchid may also refer to:

== Plants ==
- Aganisia cyanea, an orchid species from Latin America
  - Hybrids between this species and other genera in subtribe Zygopetalinae are also known for having blue or nearly blue flowers
- Bletilla striata, a species of orchid from East Asia. A few varieties have light lavender-blue flowers.
- Cattleya, a genus of orchids. The "coerulea" forms of various species have violet-blue flowers, such as:
  - Cattleya bicolor
  - Cattleya loddigesii
- Cleisocentron gokusingii, an almost entirely blue orchid from Borneo
- Cleisocentron merrillianum, an almost entirely blue orchid from Borneo
- Dendrobium ceraula, an orchid species from the Philippines also known as the "Horned Dendrobium". Closely related to Dendrobium victoriae-reginae
- Dendrobium cyanocentrum, an orchid species from New Guinea; see List of Dendrobium species
- Dendrobium leucocyanum, an orchid species from New Guinea; see List of Dendrobium species
- Dendrobium victoriae-reginae, an orchid species from the Philippines also known as "Queen Victoria's Dendrobium"
- Disa graminifolia, an orchid species from South Africa
- Disa purpurascens, an orchid species from South Africa
- Glossodia major, an orchid species from Australia
- Pabstia jugosa, an orchid species from Brazil
- Pescatoria coelestis, an orchid species from Latin America
- Phalaenopsis violacea, an orchid species from Southeast Asia. Certain strains of the coerulea form have violet-blue flowers
- Rhynchostylis coelestis, an orchid species from Indochina
- Thelymitra, a genus containing truly blue orchids, including:
  - Thelymitra crinita
  - Thelymitra cyanea
  - Thelymitra ixioides
  - Thelymitra pauciflora
- Thelymitra venosa
- Thelymitra angustifolia
- Tuberolabium woodii, an orchid species from the Philippines
- Vanda coerulea, an orchid species from South Asia
  - Hybrids of this species with others in subtribe Aeridinae also have deep purple-blue flowers
- Vanda coerulescens, an orchid species from South Asia
- Vanda tessellata, an orchid species from South Asia

== Other uses ==
- The Commission of the EU and the ECDC organised the exercise ‘Blue Orchid’ to test crisis management functions in 2019:
- Blue Orchids, a British band
- Operation Blue Orchid, a police operation
