= Trachoma (disambiguation) =

Trachoma is an infectious disease

Trachoma may also refer to:

- Trachoma (moth), a genus of moths in the family Ypsolophidae
- Trachoma (plant), a genus of plants in the family Orchidaceae
