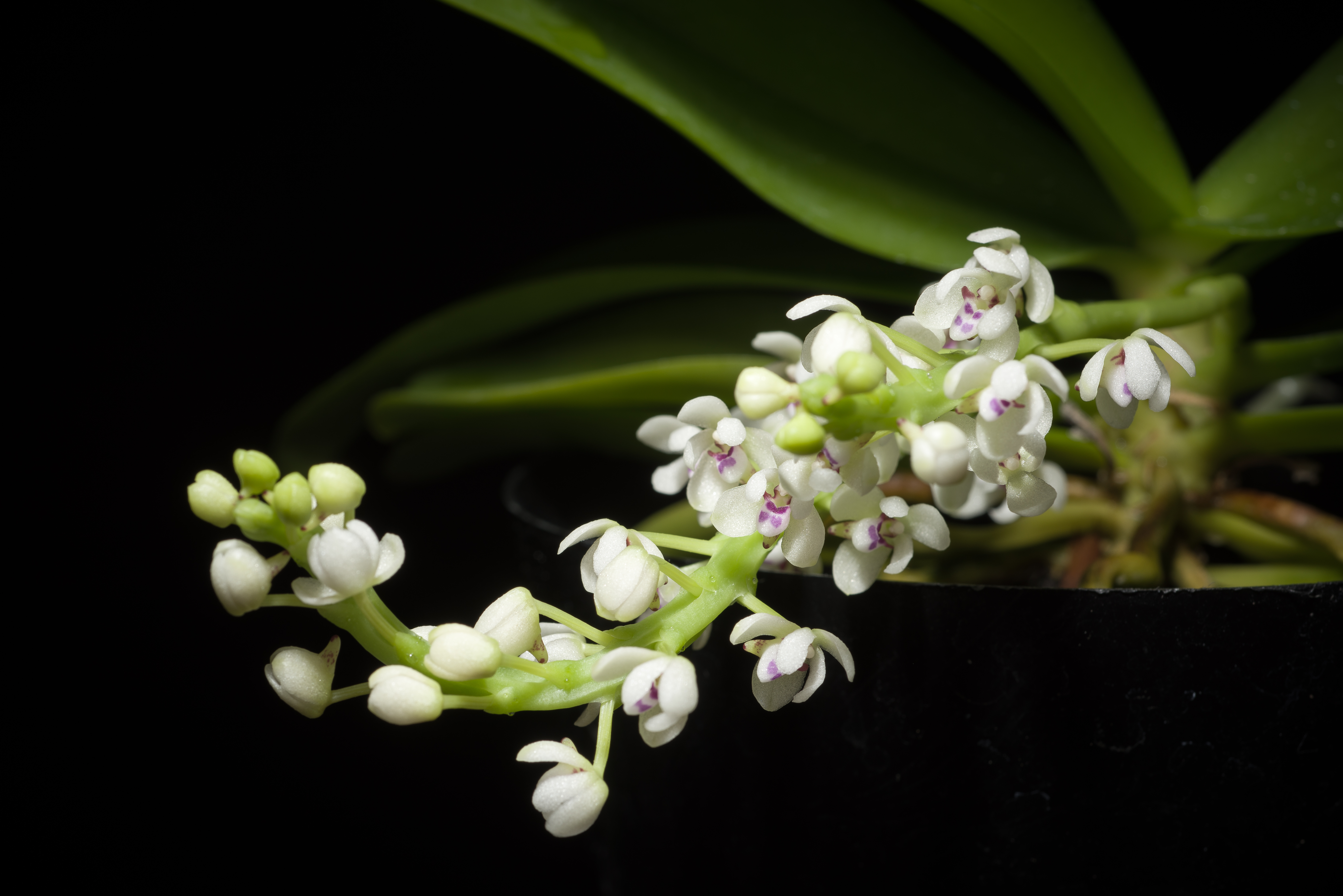

Scientific classification
- Kingdom: Plantae
- Clade: Tracheophytes
- Clade: Angiosperms
- Clade: Monocots
- Order: Asparagales
- Family: Orchidaceae
- Subfamily: Epidendroideae
- Genus: Tuberolabium
- Species: T. kotoense

Binomial name
- Tuberolabium kotoense Yamam.

Synonyms
- Saccolabium kotoense (Yamam.) Yamam.

= Tuberolabium kotoense =

Species of orchid

Tuberolabium kotoense is an orchid in the genus Tuberolabium and an endemic species to southern Taiwan. The flowers are mostly white with purple and brown coloring on the lip. This species grows as an epiphyte in humid environments only found within Taiwanese subtropical evergreen forests.

== Cultivation ==
Tuberolabium kotoense is grown by orchid growers for its fragrant and long lasting flowers. Generally care involves providing moderate temperatures, light, and water year round.

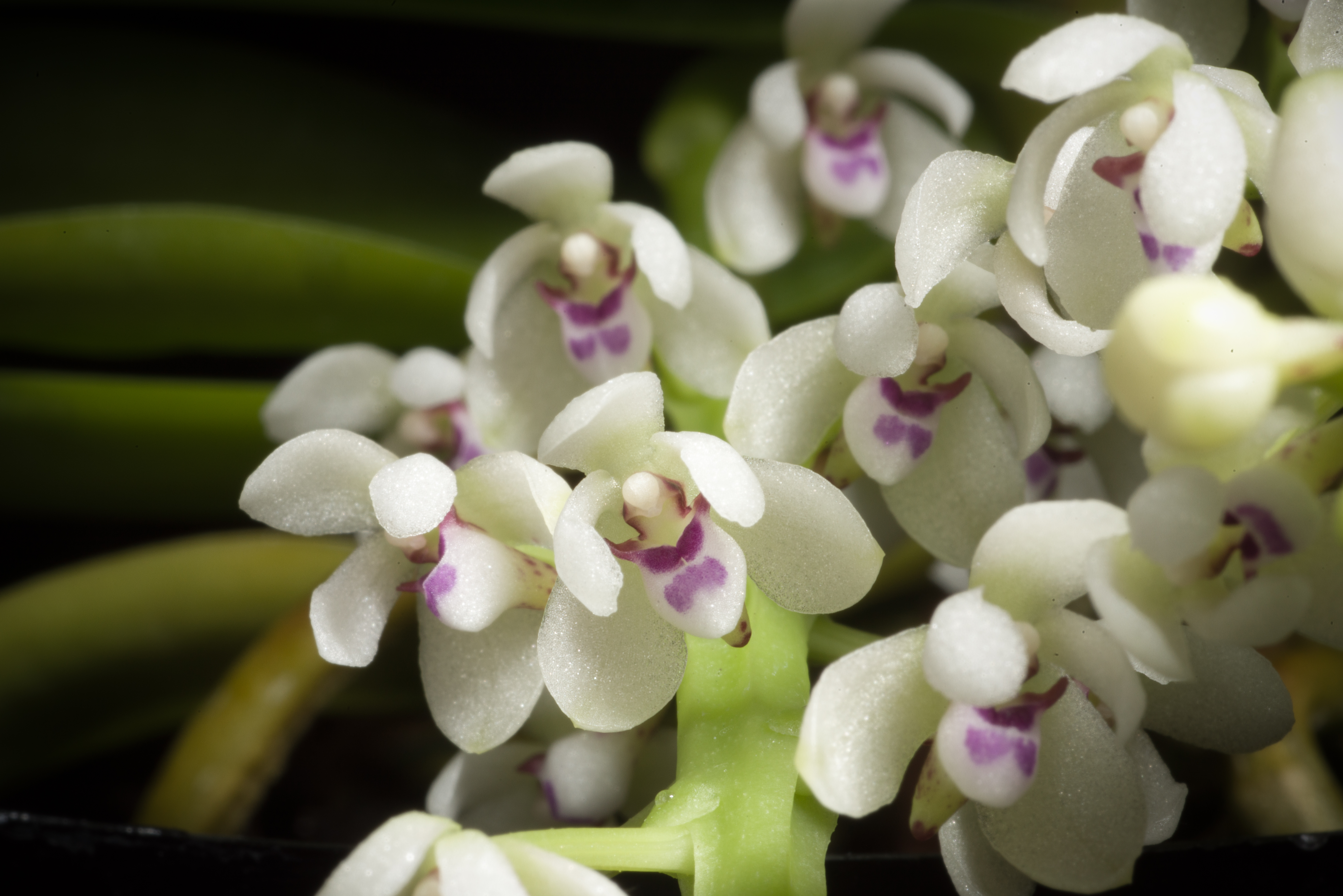
Closeup of Tuberolabium kotoense flowers
