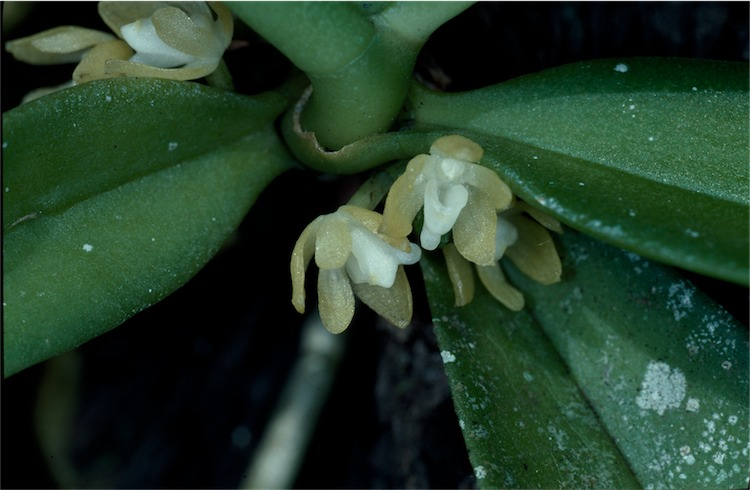
- Near Millaa Millaa

Scientific classification
- Kingdom: Plantae
- Clade: Tracheophytes
- Clade: Angiosperms
- Clade: Monocots
- Order: Asparagales
- Family: Orchidaceae
- Subfamily: Epidendroideae
- Genus: Trachoma
- Species: T. papuanum

Binomial name
- Trachoma papuanum (Schltr.) M.A.Clem., J.J.Wood & D.L.Jones

Synonyms
- Parapteroceras papuanum (Schltr.) Szlach.; Saccolabium papuanum Schltr.; Tuberolabium papuanum (Schltr.) J.J.Wood ex B.A.Lewis & P.J.Cribb; Saccolabium subluteum Rupp; Sarcochilus societatis J.W.Moore; Trachoma societatis (J.W.Moore) N.Hallé; Trachoma subluteum (Rupp) Garay

= Trachoma papuanum =

Yellow spectral orchid

Species of orchid

Trachoma papuanum, commonly known as the yellow spectral orchid, is an epiphytic or lithophytic clump-forming orchid with a between three and six thick, fleshy leaves and many dull yellow flowers with a white labellum opening in groups of up to four. This orchid occurs in New Guinea, Queensland and some islands in the South Pacific.

== Description ==
Trachoma papuanum is an epiphytic or lithophytic herb that forms clumps with a few thin roots and branching stems 30–60 millimetres (1.2–2.4 in) long. There are between three and six thick, fleshy, elliptic to egg-shaped, dark green leaves 50–80 millimetres (2.0–3.1 in) long, about 20 millimetres (0.79 in) wide and arranged in two ranks. A large number of short-lived, pale yellow, cup-shaped, resupinate flowers 2–3 millimetres (0.079–0.12 in) long and 3–4 millimetres (0.12–0.16 in) wide are arranged on a flowering stem 5–15 millimetres (0.20–0.59 in) long. Up to four flowers are open at the same time. The sepals are about 5 millimetres (0.20 in) long and 3 millimetres (0.12 in) wide, the petals about 4 millimetres (0.16 in) long and 1 millimetre (0.039 in) wide. The labellum is about 4 millimetres (0.16 in) long and 5 millimetres (0.20 in) wide with three short lobes and a spur about 1.5 millimetres (0.059 in) long. Flowering occurs from February to April.

== Taxonomy and naming ==
The yellow spectral orchid was first formally described in 1913 by Rudolf Schlechter who gave it the name Saccolabium papuanum and published the description in Repertorium Specierum Novarum Regni Vegetabilis Beihefte. In 1989 Mark Clements, Jeffrey Wood and David Jones changed the name to Trachoma pupuanum. The specific epithet (papuanum) refers to the type location, the ending -anum a Latin suffix meaning "pertaining to" or "belonging to".

== Distribution and habitat ==
Trachoma papuanum grows on rainforest trees often on branches over streams and in other humid places. It is found in New Guinea, the Solomon Islands, Fiji, Niue, New Caledonia, Vanuatu, the Cook Islands, the Society Islands, Tubuai and Queensland where it grows between Cairns and Innisfail.
