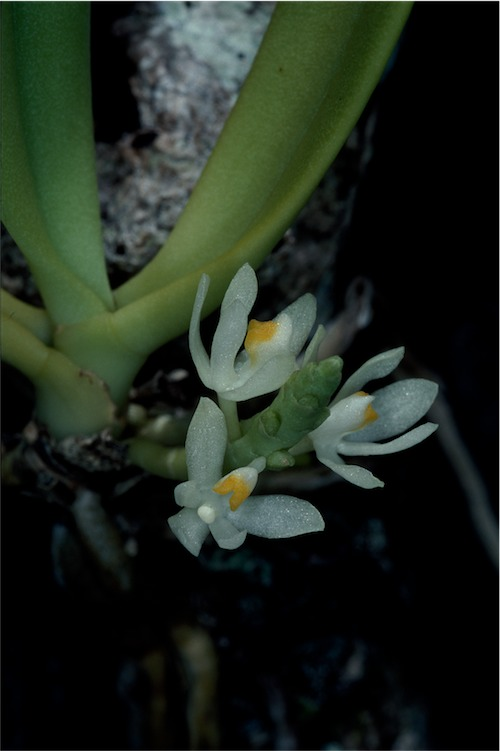
- Tracoma speciosum on the McIlwraith Range

Scientific classification
- Kingdom: Plantae
- Clade: Tracheophytes
- Clade: Angiosperms
- Clade: Monocots
- Order: Asparagales
- Family: Orchidaceae
- Subfamily: Epidendroideae
- Genus: Trachoma
- Species: T. speciosum

Binomial name
- Trachoma speciosum D.L.Jones, B.Gray, M.A.Clem. & J.J.Wood

Synonyms
- Tuberolabium speciosum (D.L.Jones, B.Gray, M.A.Clem. & J.J.Wood) J.J.Wood; Parapteroceras speciosum (D.L.Jones, B.Gray, M.A.Clem. & J.J.Wood) Szlach.

= Trachoma speciosum =

Showy spectral orchid

Species of orchid

Trachoma speciosum, commonly known as the showy spectral orchid, is an epiphytic or lithophytic orchid that forms clumps with many thick, cord-like roots, between four and eight thick, leathery leaves and many short-lived, cream-coloured flowers with an orange and white labellum. This orchid occurs in tropical North Queensland.

== Description ==
Trachoma speciosum is an epiphytic or lithophytic herb that forms clumps with many thick roots supporting thick stems 50–100 millimetres (2.0–3.9 in) long. There are between four and eight crowded thick, leathery lance-shaped leaves 80–140 millimetres (3.1–5.5 in) long and 20–25 millimetres (0.79–0.98 in) wide. A large number of short-lived, cream-coloured resupinate flowers, 8–10 millimetres (0.31–0.39 in) long and wide are arranged on a club-shaped flowering stem 20–45 millimetres (0.79–1.8 in) long. The sepals are about 7 millimetres (0.28 in) long and 2 millimetres (0.079 in) wide, the petals a similar length but narrower. The labellum is about 6 millimetres (0.24 in) long and 4 millimetres (0.16 in) wide with three lobes. The side lobes are erect, fleshy and triangular and the middle lobe has a short spur. Flowering occurs from December to May.

== Taxonomy and naming ==
Trachoma speciosum was first formally described in 1989 by David Jones, Bruce Gray, Mark Clements and Jeffrey Wood and the description was published in Australian Orchid Research. The specific epithet (speciosum) is a Latin word meaning "beautiful", "handsome", "splendid" or "showy".

== Distribution and habitat ==
The showy spectral orchid grows on trees near the edges of rainforest, and on emergent hoop pine (Araucaria cunninghamii) in drier rainforest. It is found between the Iron and McIlwraith Ranges in Queensland.
