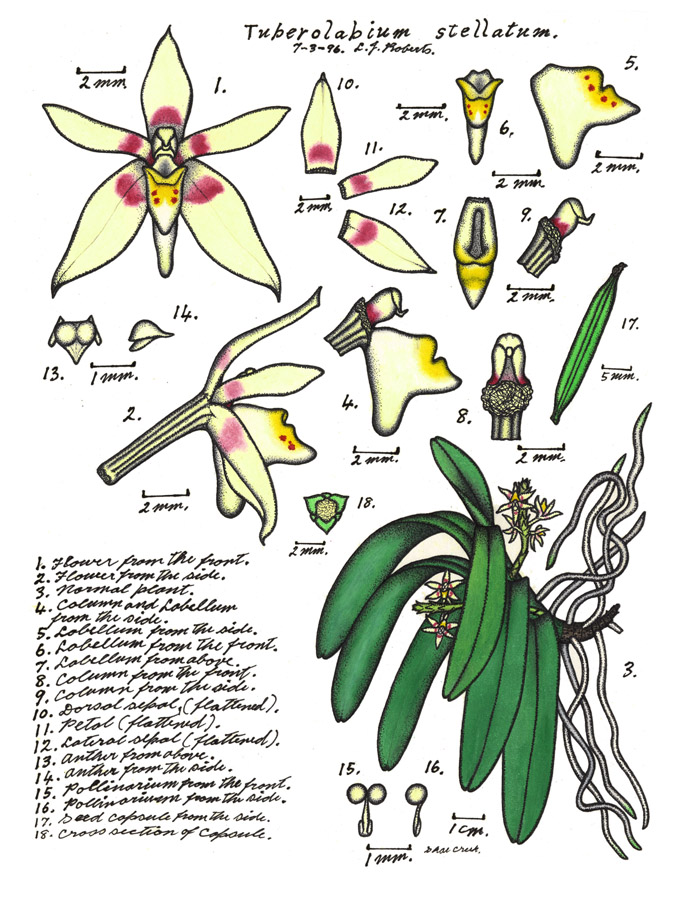
- Illustration by Lewis Roberts

Scientific classification
- Kingdom: Plantae
- Clade: Tracheophytes
- Clade: Angiosperms
- Clade: Monocots
- Order: Asparagales
- Family: Orchidaceae
- Subfamily: Epidendroideae
- Genus: Trachoma
- Species: T. stellatum

Binomial name
- Trachoma stellatum D.L.Jones, B.Gray, M.A.Clem. & J.J.Wood

Synonyms
- Tuberolabium stellatum (D.L.Jones, B.Gray, M.A.Clem. & J.J.Wood) J.J.Wood

= Trachoma stellatum =

Starry spectral orchid

Species of orchid

Trachoma stellatum, commonly known as the starry spectral orchid, is an epiphytic or lithophytic clump-forming orchid with many thick roots. It has between three and eight thick, leathery leaves and many short-lived, cream-coloured flowers with purple markings and a yellow-tipped labellum. This orchid occurs in tropical North Queensland.

== Description ==
Trachoma stellatum is an epiphytic or lithophytic herb that forms clumps with many thick roots supporting sometimes branching stems 30–60 millimetres (1.2–2.4 in) long. There are between three and eight thick, leathery, oblong, pale to yellowish green leaves 50–70 millimetres (2.0–2.8 in) long, about 20 millimetres (0.79 in) wide and arranged in two ranks. A large number of short-lived, cream-coloured, resupinate flowers with purple markings, 8–9 millimetres (0.31–0.35 in) long and 4–5 millimetres (0.16–0.20 in) wide are arranged on a club-shaped flowering stem 10–35 millimetres (0.39–1.4 in) long. Up to ten flowers are open at the same time. The sepals and petals are about 5 millimetres (0.20 in) long and 1.5 millimetres (0.059 in) wide. The labellum is about 5 millimetres (0.20 in) long and 4 millimetres (0.16 in) wide with three lobes. The side lobes are erect, fleshy and triangular and the middle lobe is about 1 millimetre (0.039 in) long with a spur about 1.5 millimetres (0.059 in) long. Flowering occurs from March to July.

== Taxonomy and naming ==
Trachoma stellatum was first formally described in 1989 by David Jones, Bruce Gray, Mark Clements and Jeffrey Wood and the description was published in Australian Orchid Research. The specific epithet (stellatum) is a Latin word meaning "starred" or "starry".

== Distribution and habitat ==
The starry spectral orchid grows on rainforest trees and in humid places near rainforest edges. It is found between the Iron and McIlwraith Ranges at altitudes from 400 to 600 metres (1,300 to 2,000 ft) in Queensland.
