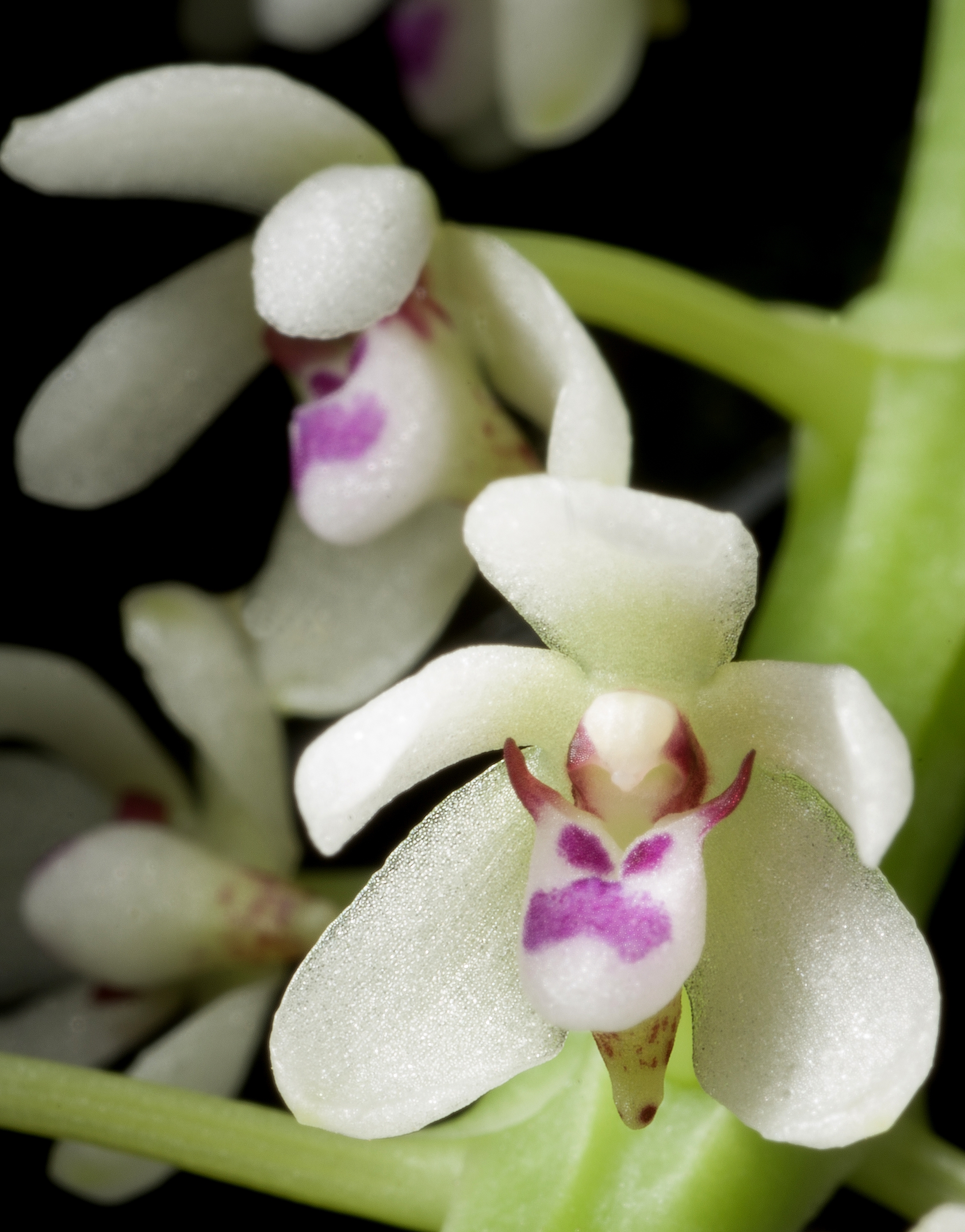
- Tuberolabium kotoense in Taiwan

Scientific classification
- Kingdom: Plantae
- Clade: Tracheophytes
- Clade: Angiosperms
- Clade: Monocots
- Order: Asparagales
- Family: Orchidaceae
- Subfamily: Epidendroideae
- Tribe: Vandeae
- Subtribe: Aeridinae
- Genus: Tuberolabium; Yamam.

Synonyms
- Parapteroceras Aver.

= Tuberolabium =

Genus of orchids

Tuberolabium is a genus of epiphytic flowering plants from the orchid family, Orchidaceae. It is native to the Old World Tropics, including China, Indochina, Taiwan, Indonesia, and the Philippines. Several species formerly included in Tuberolabium are now placed in the genus Trachoma.

== Species ==
Species accepted by Plants of the World Online as of August 2023:

- Tuberolabium camperenik Yudistira, Naive & Romiyadi
- Tuberolabium elobe (Seidenf.) Seidenf.
- Tuberolabium erosulum (J.J.Sm.) Garay
- Tuberolabium escritorii (Ames) Garay
- Tuberolabium kotoense Yamam.
- Tuberolabium pendulum P.O'Byrne & J.J.Verm.
- Tuberolabium quisumbingii (L.O.Williams) Christenson
- Tuberolabium subulatum Jian W.Li & X.H.Jin
- Tuberolabium woodii Choltco
- Tuberolabium zollingeri (Rchb.f.) Ormerod & Juswara

== See also ==
- List of Orchidaceae genera
