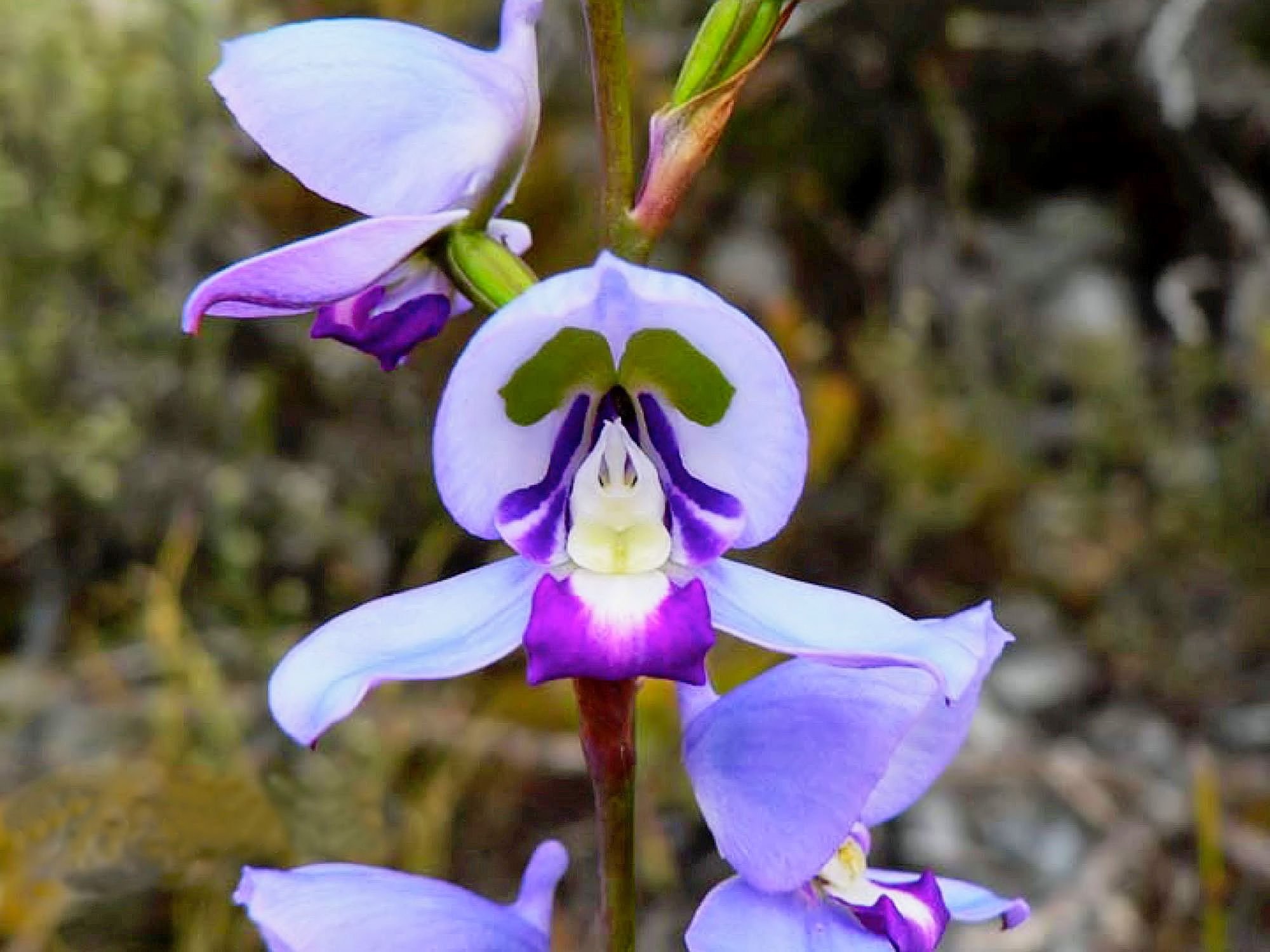

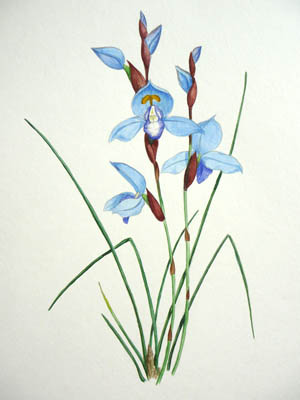

Scientific classification
- Kingdom: Plantae
- Clade: Tracheophytes
- Clade: Angiosperms
- Clade: Monocots
- Order: Asparagales
- Family: Orchidaceae
- Subfamily: Orchidoideae
- Genus: Disa
- Species: D. graminifolia

Binomial name
- Disa graminifolia Ker Gawl. ex Spreng.

= Disa graminifolia =

Species of orchid

Disa graminifolia is a species of orchid found in the Cape Floristic Region of South Africa.

Known as the blue disa, it flowers from January to March. It is similar in appearance to Disa purpurascens, which flowers in October and November.
