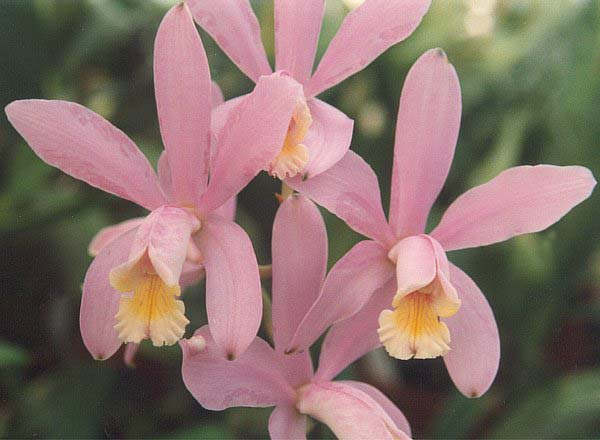

Scientific classification
- Kingdom: Plantae
- Clade: Tracheophytes
- Clade: Angiosperms
- Clade: Monocots
- Order: Asparagales
- Family: Orchidaceae
- Subfamily: Epidendroideae
- Genus: Cattleya
- Subgenus: Cattleya subg. Intermediae
- Species: C. loddigesii

Binomial name
- Cattleya loddigesii Lindl.

Synonyms
- Epidendrum violaceum Lodd.; Epidendrum loddigesii (Lindl.) Rchb.f.; Cattleya arembergii Scheidw.; Cattleya candida F.N. Williams; Epidendrum harrisonianum Rchb.f.; Cattleya obrieniana Rolfe

= Cattleya loddigesii =

Species of orchid

Cattleya loddigesii is a species of orchid.
