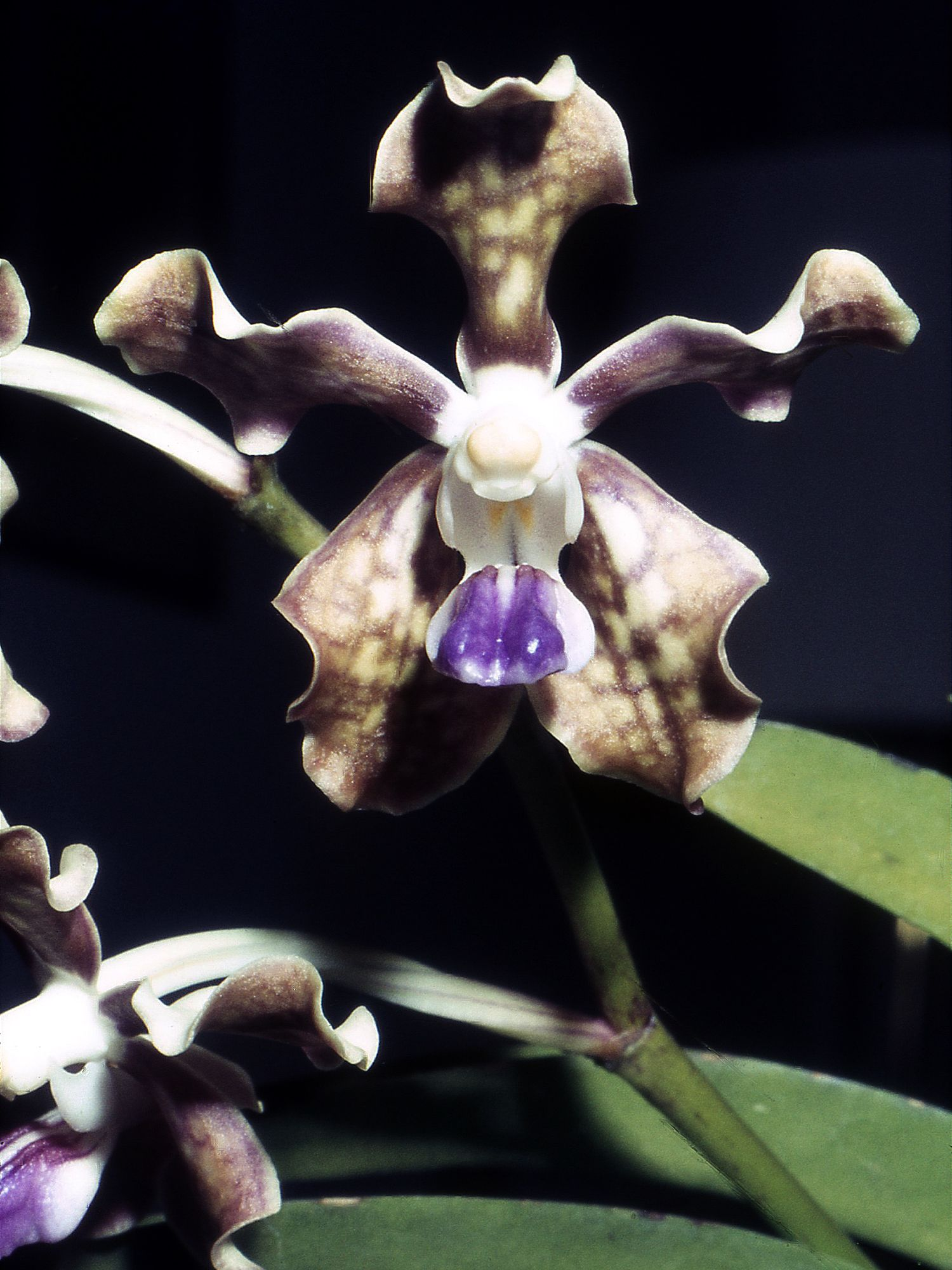

Conservation status
- Least Concern (IUCN 3.1)

Scientific classification
- Kingdom: Plantae
- Clade: Tracheophytes
- Clade: Angiosperms
- Clade: Monocots
- Order: Asparagales
- Family: Orchidaceae
- Subfamily: Epidendroideae
- Genus: Vanda
- Species: V. tessellata

Binomial name
- Vanda tessellata (Roxb.) Hook. ex G.Don

Synonyms
- Epidendrum tessellatum Roxb. (basionym); Cymbidium tessellatum (Roxb.) Sw.; Vanda roxburghii R.Br.; Aerides tessellata (Roxb.) Wight ex Wall.; Cymbidium allagnata Buch.-Ham. ex Wall.; Cymbidium tesselloides Roxb.; Vanda tesselloides (Roxb.) Rchb.f.; Vanda roxburghii var. wrightiana Rchb.f.

= Vanda tessellata =

Species of orchid

Vanda tessellata (also known as Grey orchid or Checkered Vanda) is a species of orchid occurring from the Indian subcontinent to Indochina. It is a medicinal plant.

== Description ==
It is an epiphytic perennial, stem 30–60 cm long, stout, scandent by the stout, simple or branching aerial roots. Leaves succulent, 15–20 cm, long, linear, recurved, complicate. Flowers in 6–10 flowered racemes, reaching with the peduncle 15–25 cm long. Sepals yellow, tessellated with brown lines and with white margins. Petals yellow with brown lines and white margins, shorter than the sepals. Lip 16 mm long, bluish, dotted with purple. Capsules 7.5–9 cm long, narrowly clavate-oblong with acute ribs.

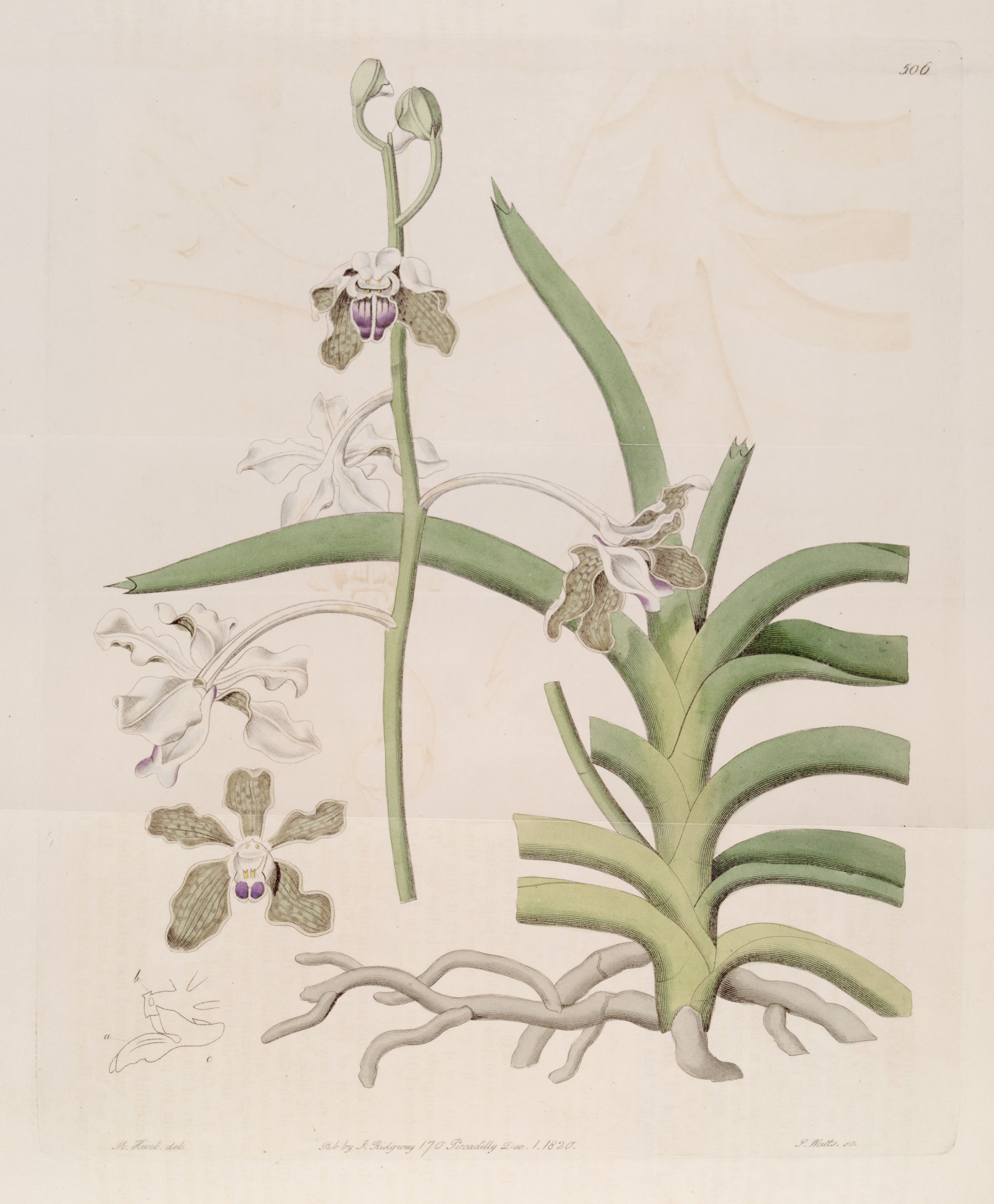
Vanda tessellata (as syn. Vanda roxburghii) plate 506 in: The Botanical Register (Orchidaceae), vol. 6, (1820)

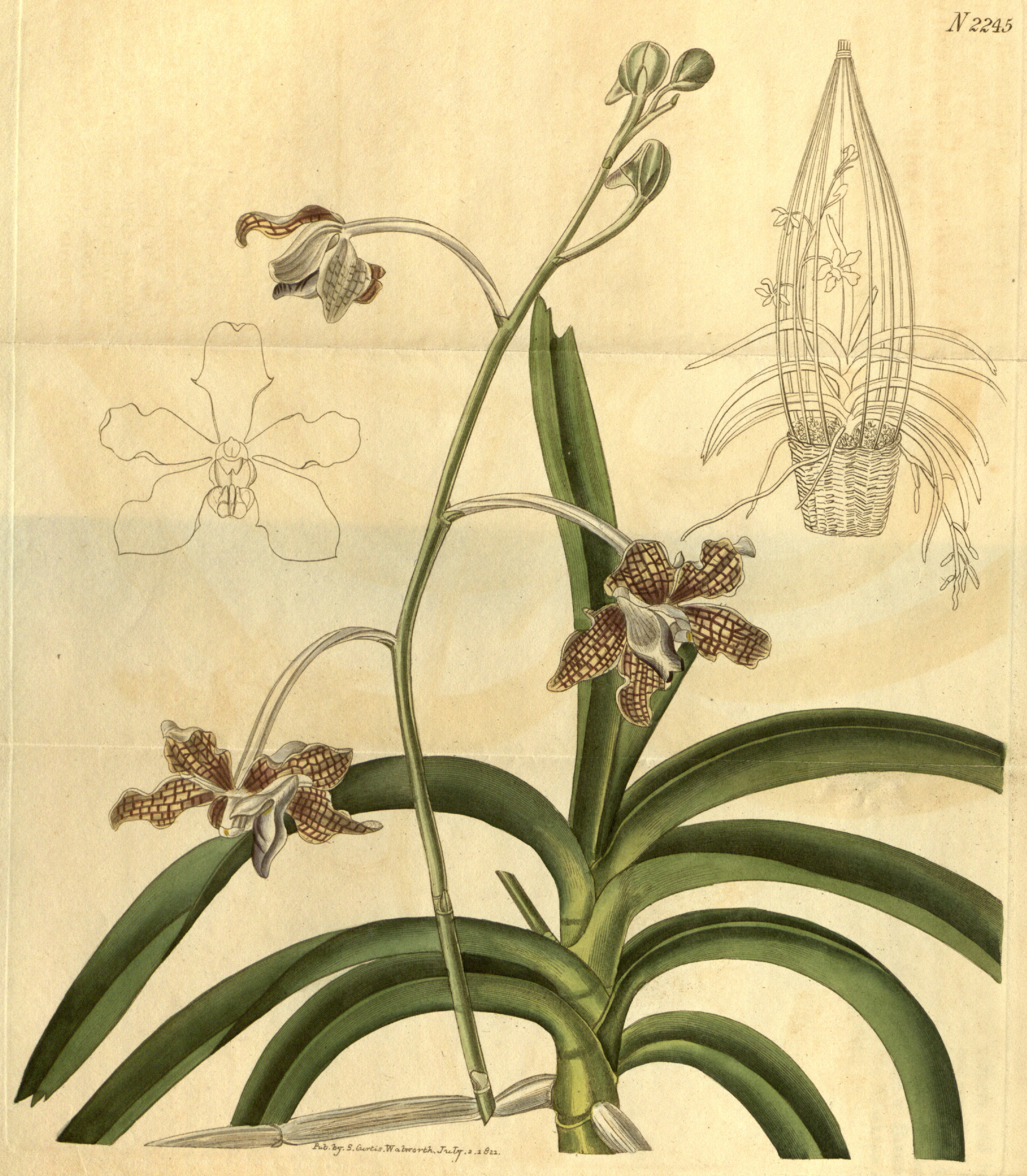
Vanda tessellata (as syn. Vanda roxburghii) plate 2245 in: Curtis's Bot. Magazine (Orchidaceae), vol. 48, (1821)

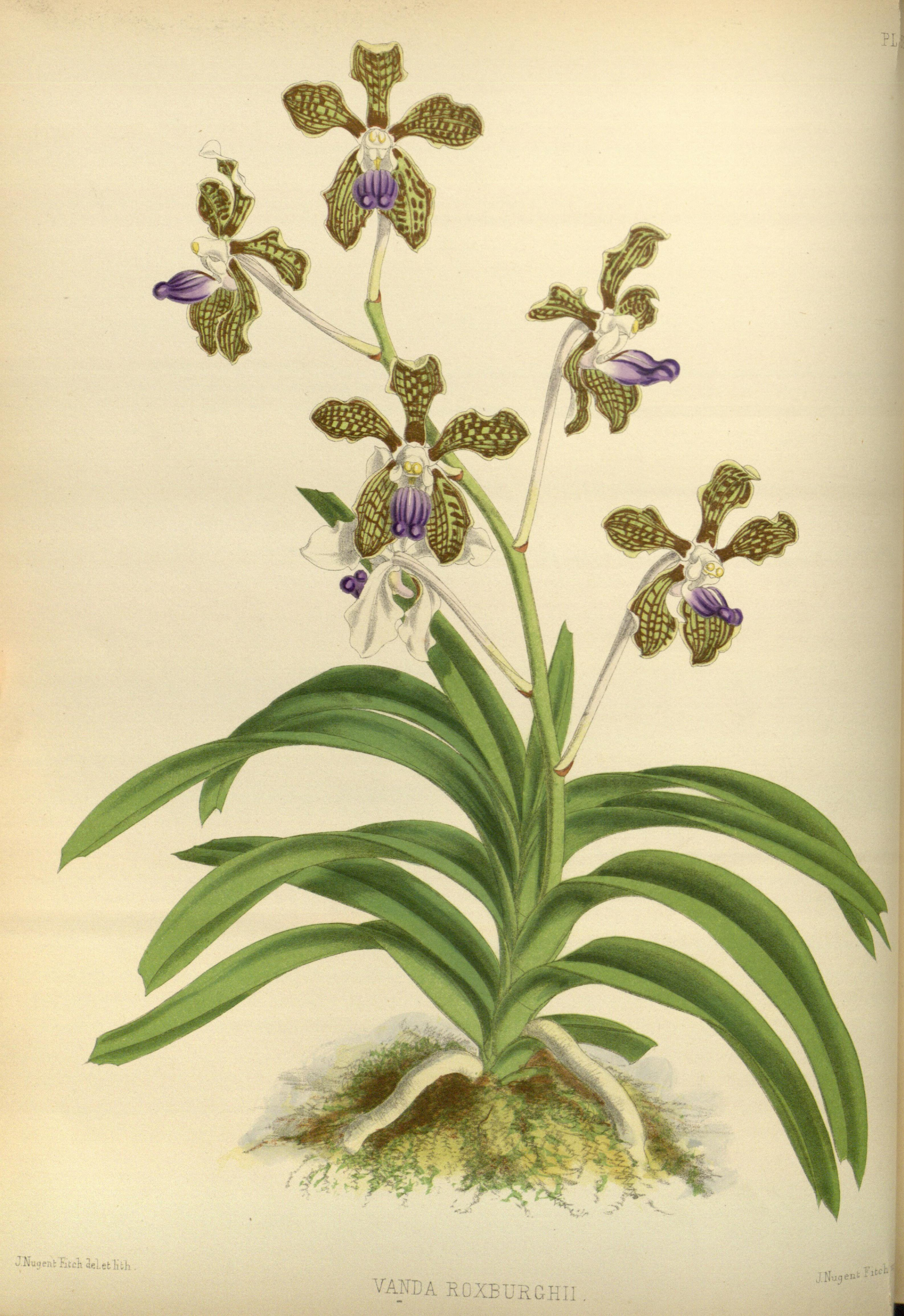
Vanda tessellata (as syn. Vanda roxburghii) Plate 59 in: R.Warner - B.S.Williams: The Orchid Album (1882-1897)

== Medicinal uses ==
The roots are alexiteric and antipyretic; useful in dyspepsia, bronchitis, inflammations, piles and hiccup. Externally the root is used in rheumatism and allied disorders and diseases of the nervous system. It is also employed as a remedy for secondary syphilis and scorpion stings. The juice of the leaves is used topically in otitis and a paste of them finds use as a febrifuge. The roots possess significant anti-inflammatory activity. and exhibit potent analgesic effects combined with a relatively low toxicity A novel aphrodisiac compound ( 2,7,7-tri methyl bicyclo [2.2.1] heptane) has been found in the orchid in 2013.

== Chemical composition ==
The plant produces an alkaloid, a glucoside, tannins, β-sitosterol, γ-sitosterol and a long chain aliphatic compound, fatty oils, resins and colouring matters. Roots contain tetracosyl ferrulate and β-sitosterol-D-glucoside.

== Traditional practices ==
In the Yunani system, the root is used as a tonic for the liver and brain; effective against bronchitis, piles, lumbago, toothache, and boils of the scalp; it also is said to lessen inflammation and heal fractures. The root is said to be fragrant, bitter and useful in rheumatism and allied disorders, in which it is prescribed in a variety of forms. It is also used in the composition of several medicated oils for external application in rheumatism and diseases of the nervous system. In Chota Nagpur, the leaves are pounded into a paste and then applied to the body during fever. A compound decoction of this root is administered in cases of Hemiplegia as some Indian physicians consider it useful in rheumatism and all nervous diseases. The leaves are pounded and the paste is applied to the body to bring down fever; the juice is dropped in the ear for the treatment of Otitis media and other inflammatory conditions. The roots are used in Dyspepsia, Bronchitis, Rheumatism, and also in fever; they are reported to possess antibacterial and anti-tubercular properties. The herb is also used for Sciatica. The leaves are used by the Santhal girls for making anklets.

== Use as an entheogen in India ==
'Ayurvedic shamans' in India are said to have used the plant to induce 'the hypnotic narcosis of their office' leading to 'a transcendent state of being', having learnt originally of the intoxicating properties of this orchid by observing bees which had fed upon its nectar falling to the ground in a state of stupefaction. Evidence for the practice is sparse, but, given the presence of alkaloids in V.tessellata and its well-documented employment in diseases of the nervous system, such use is intrinsically plausible. In similar vein, Tantric magicians are said to have ingested the fleshy roots of this species as an aid to divination, along with the tubers of another orchid, Dendrobium macraei (synonyms Ephemerantha macraei and Flickingeria macraei, but see page Flickingeria re. unaccepted genus name still used in the horticulture trade).

== Gallery ==
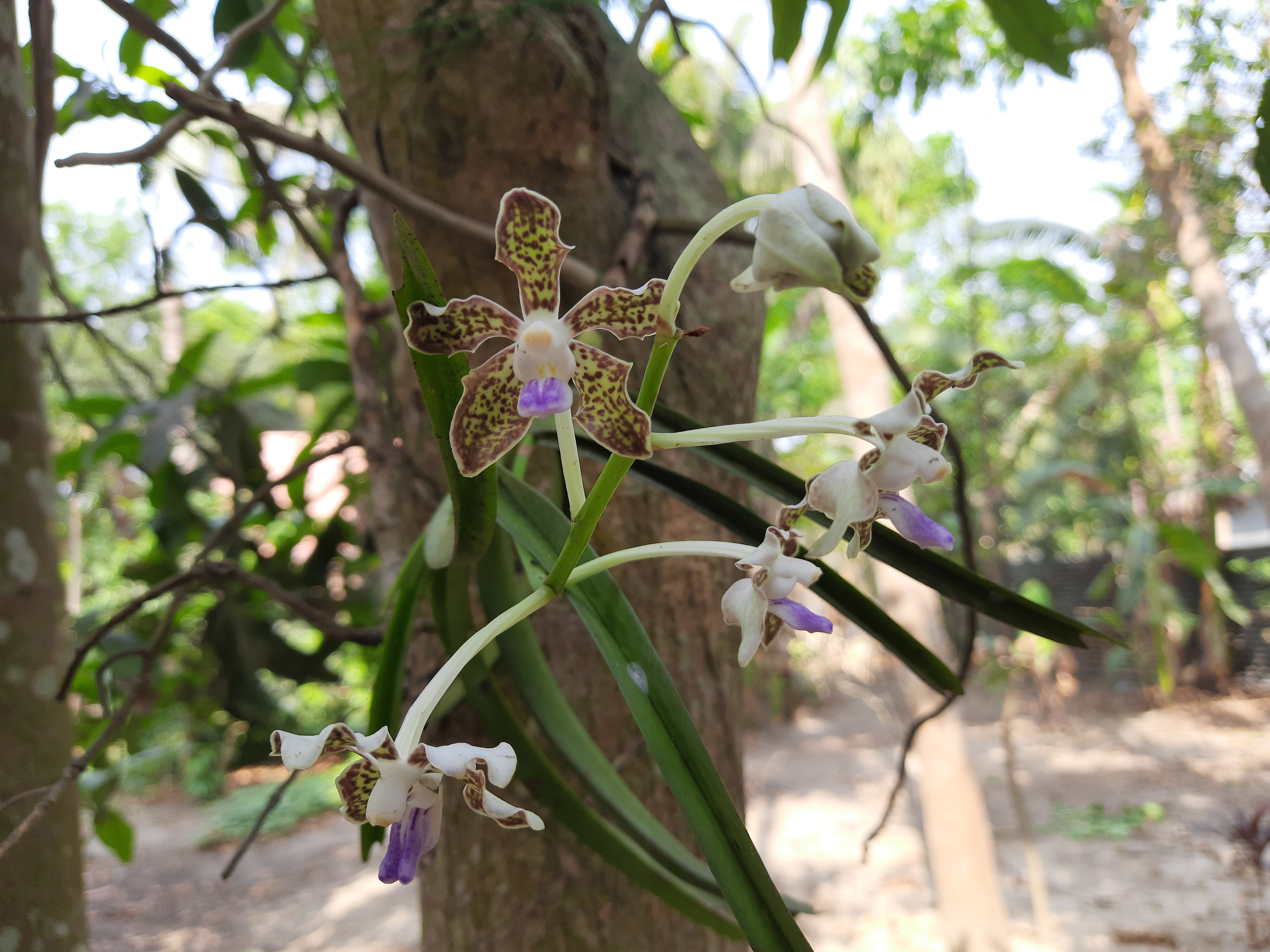
Vanda tessellata in Bangladesh

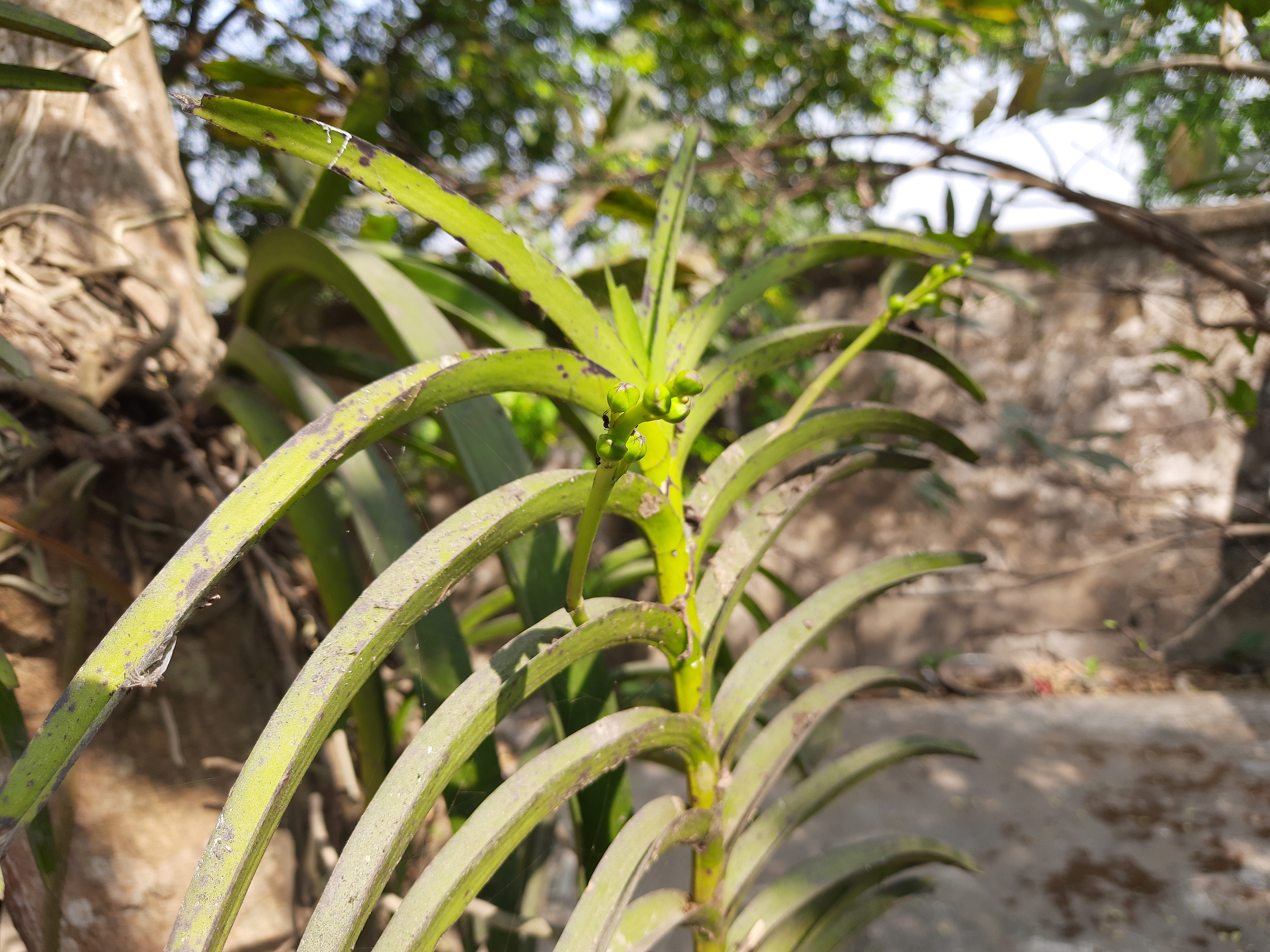
New buds of Vanda tessellata

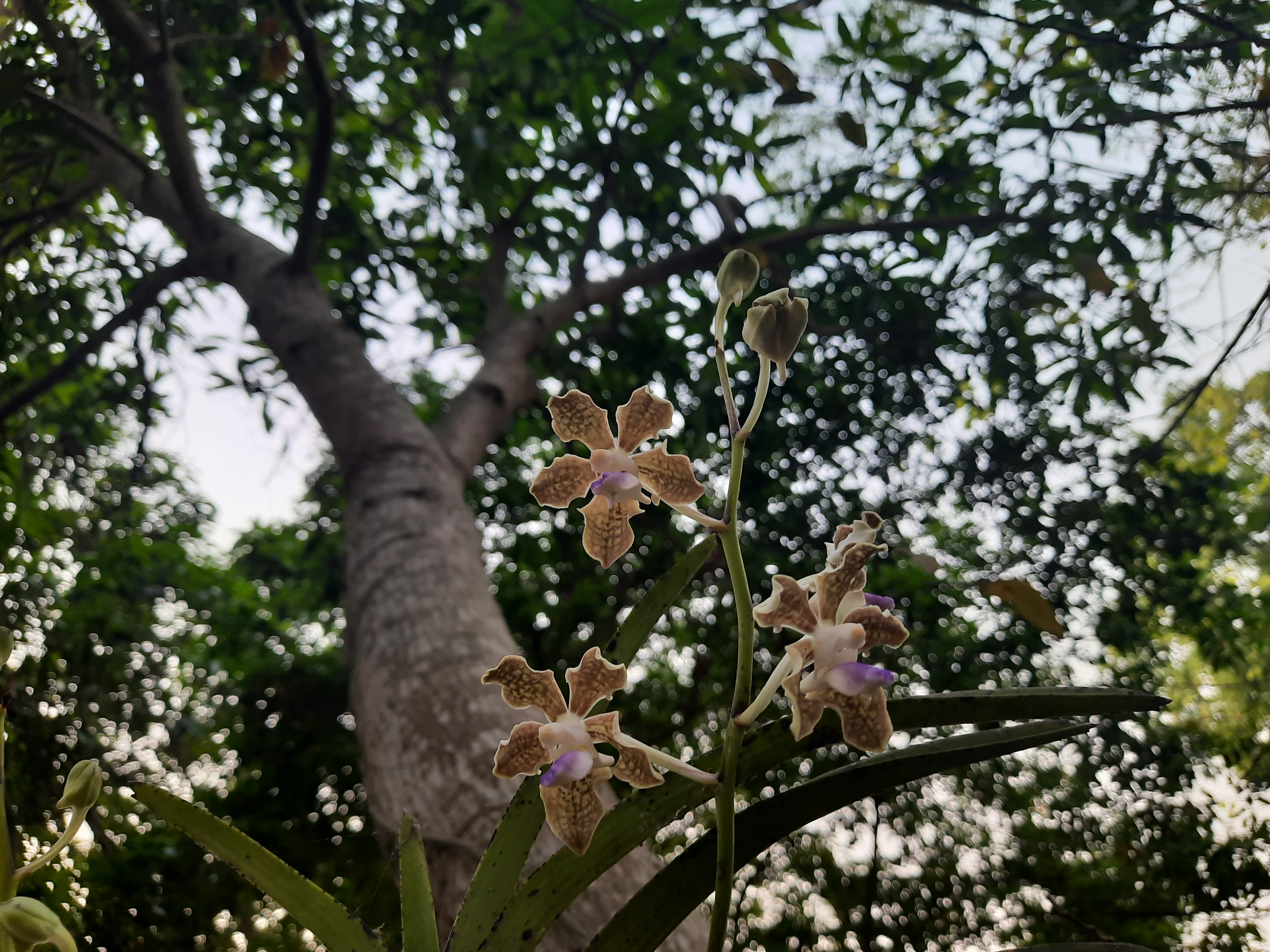
Flowers of Vanda tessellata

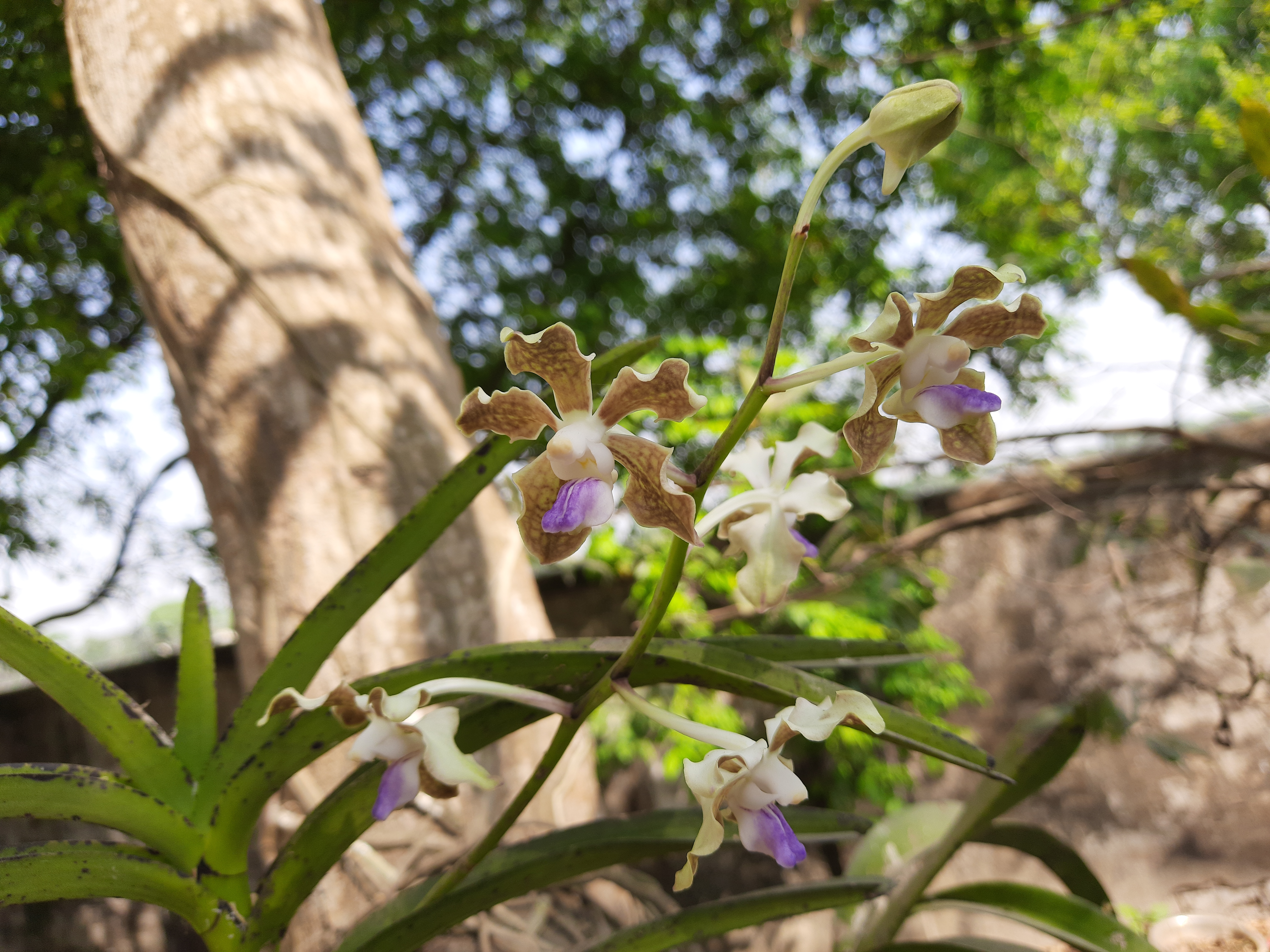
Flowers in full bloom

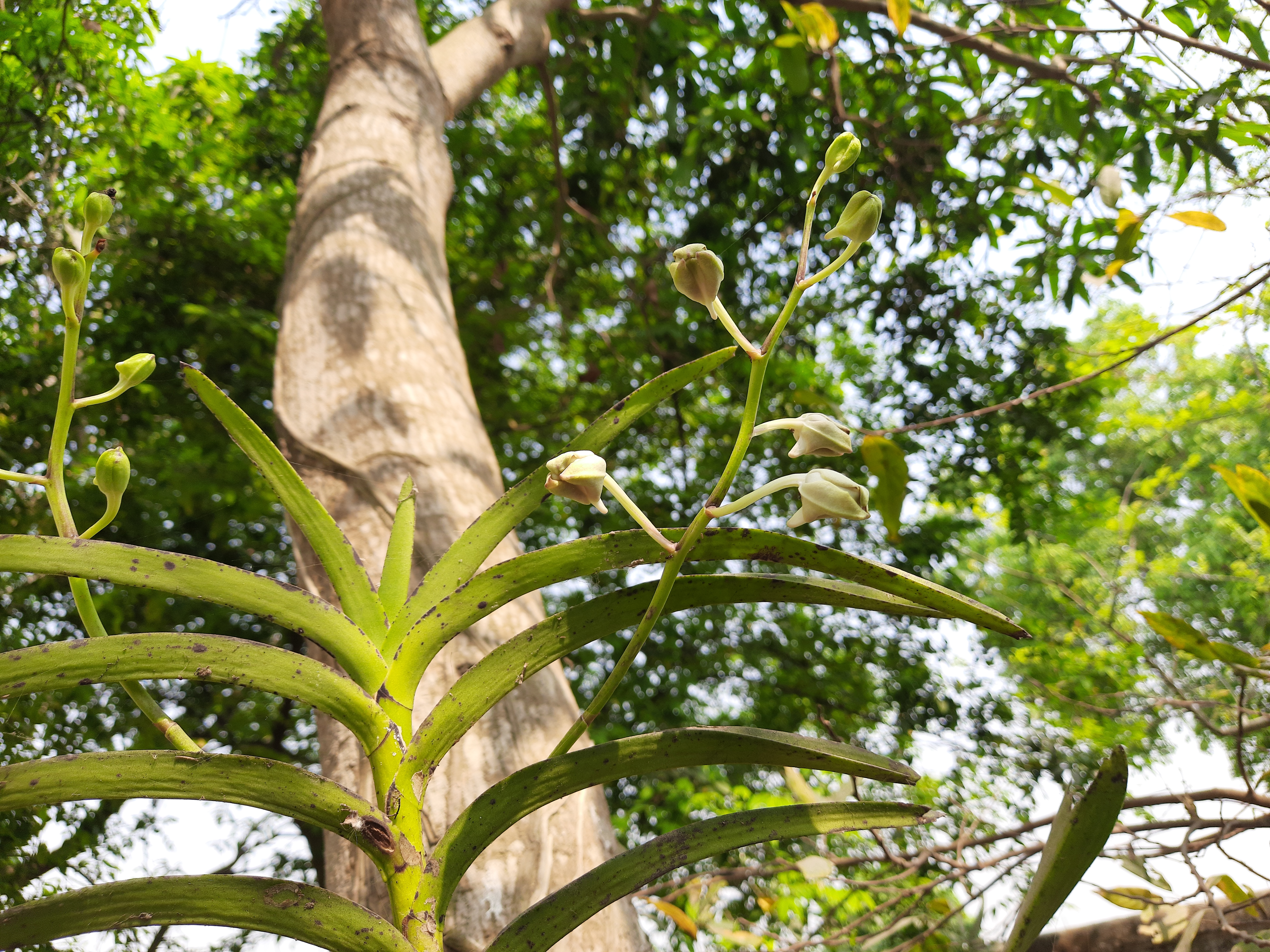
Buds of Vanda tessellata

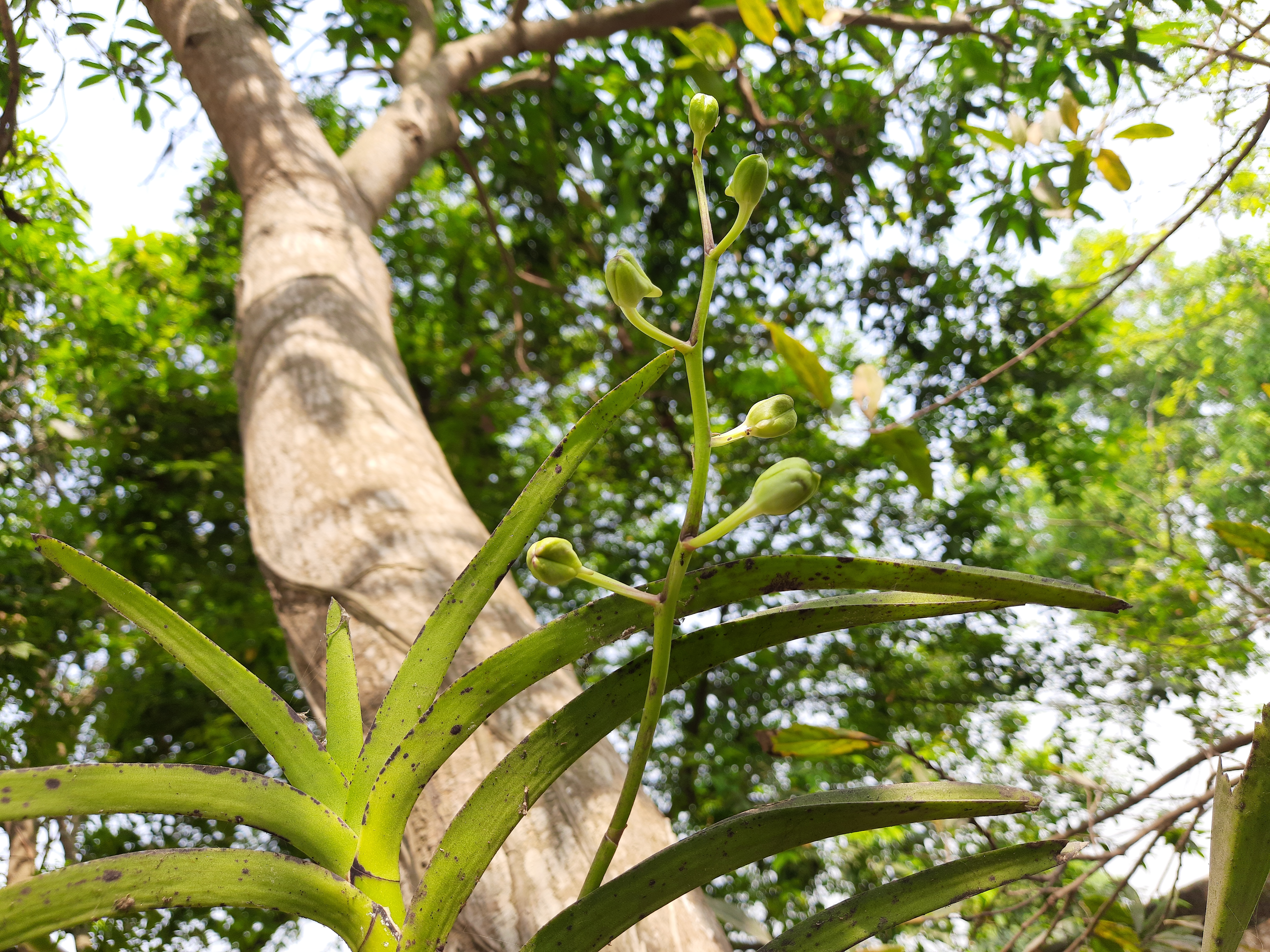
Young buds of Vanda tessellata

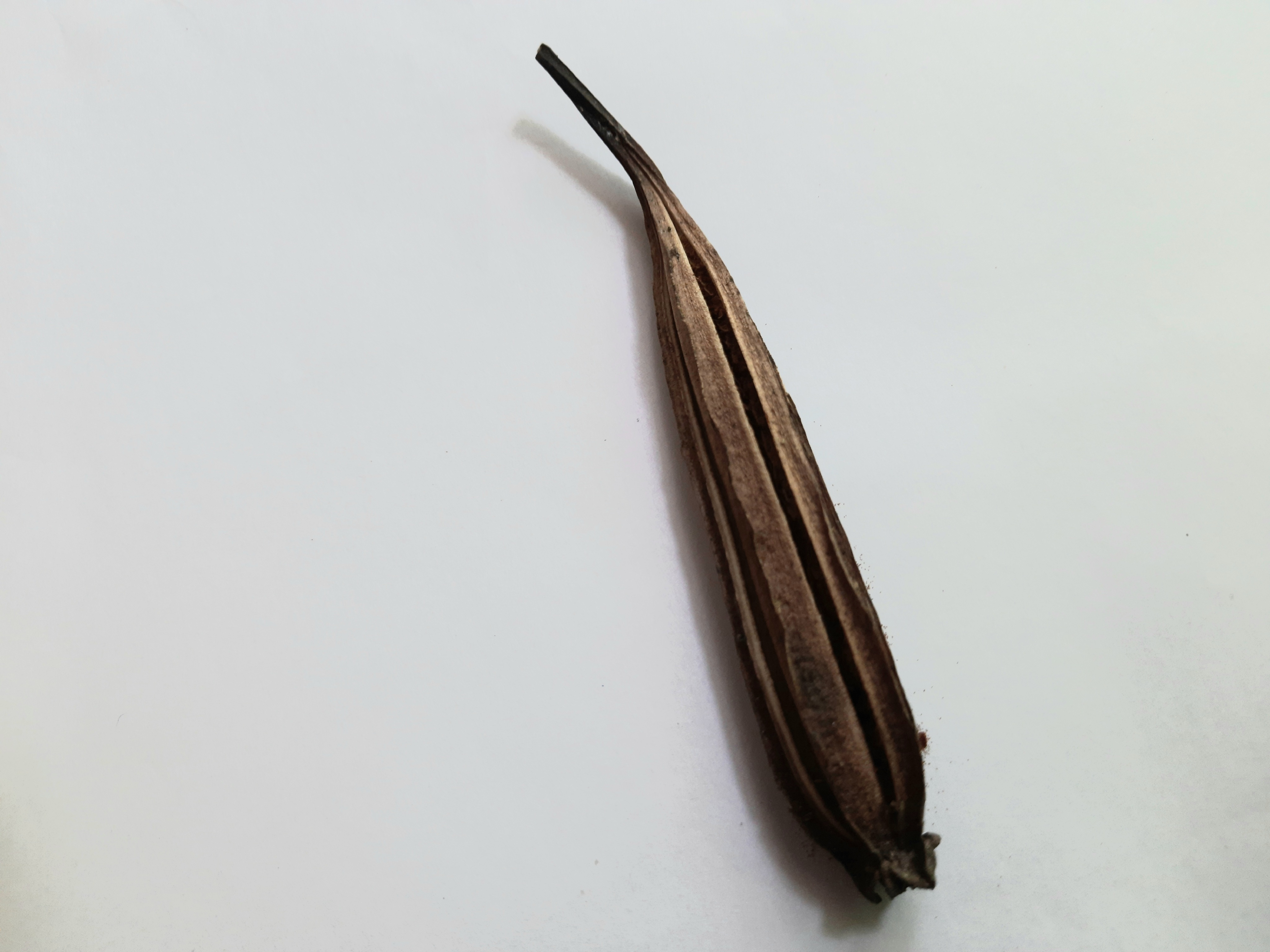
Matured fruit of Vanda tessellata

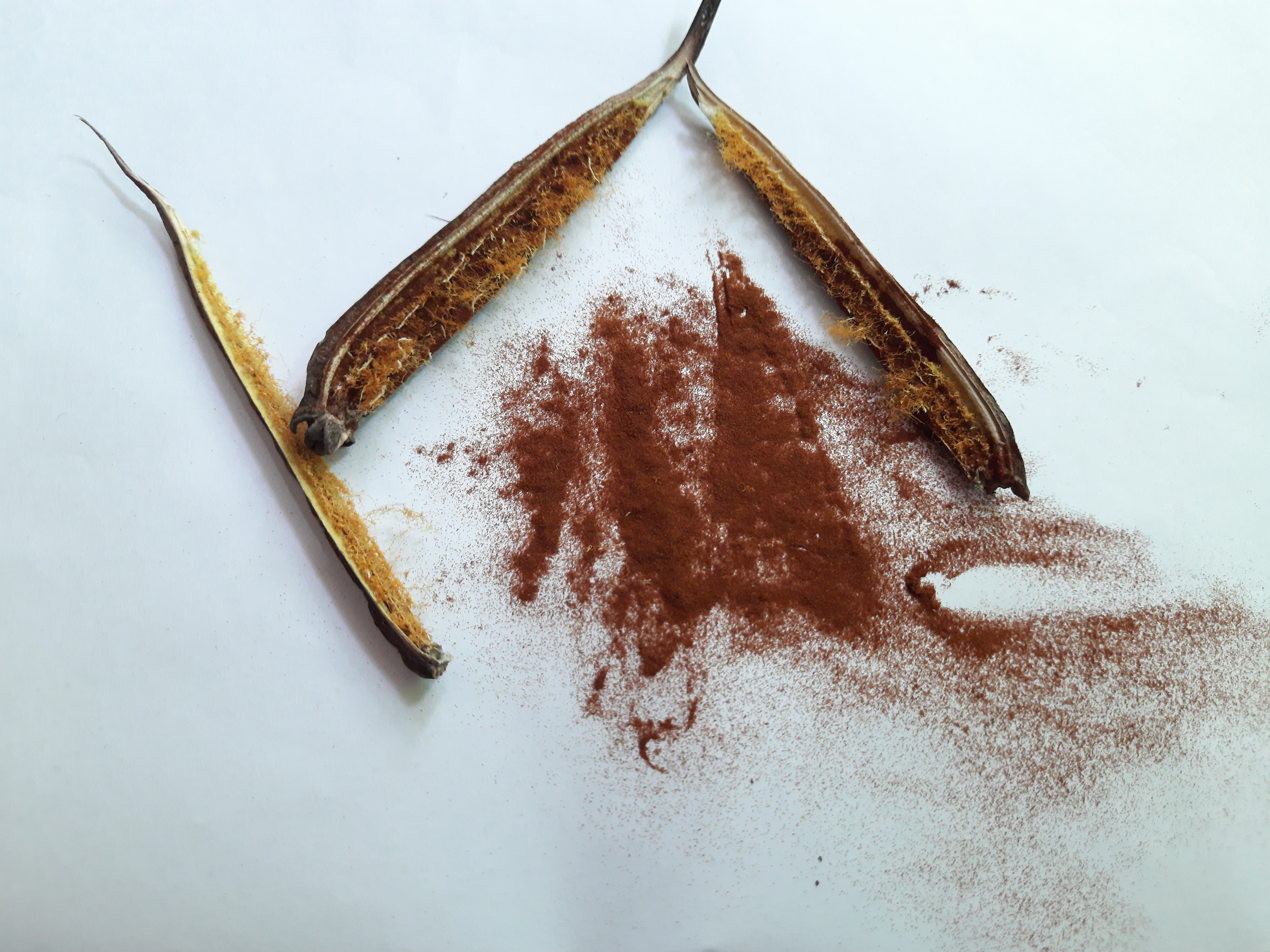
Seeds of Vanda tessellata

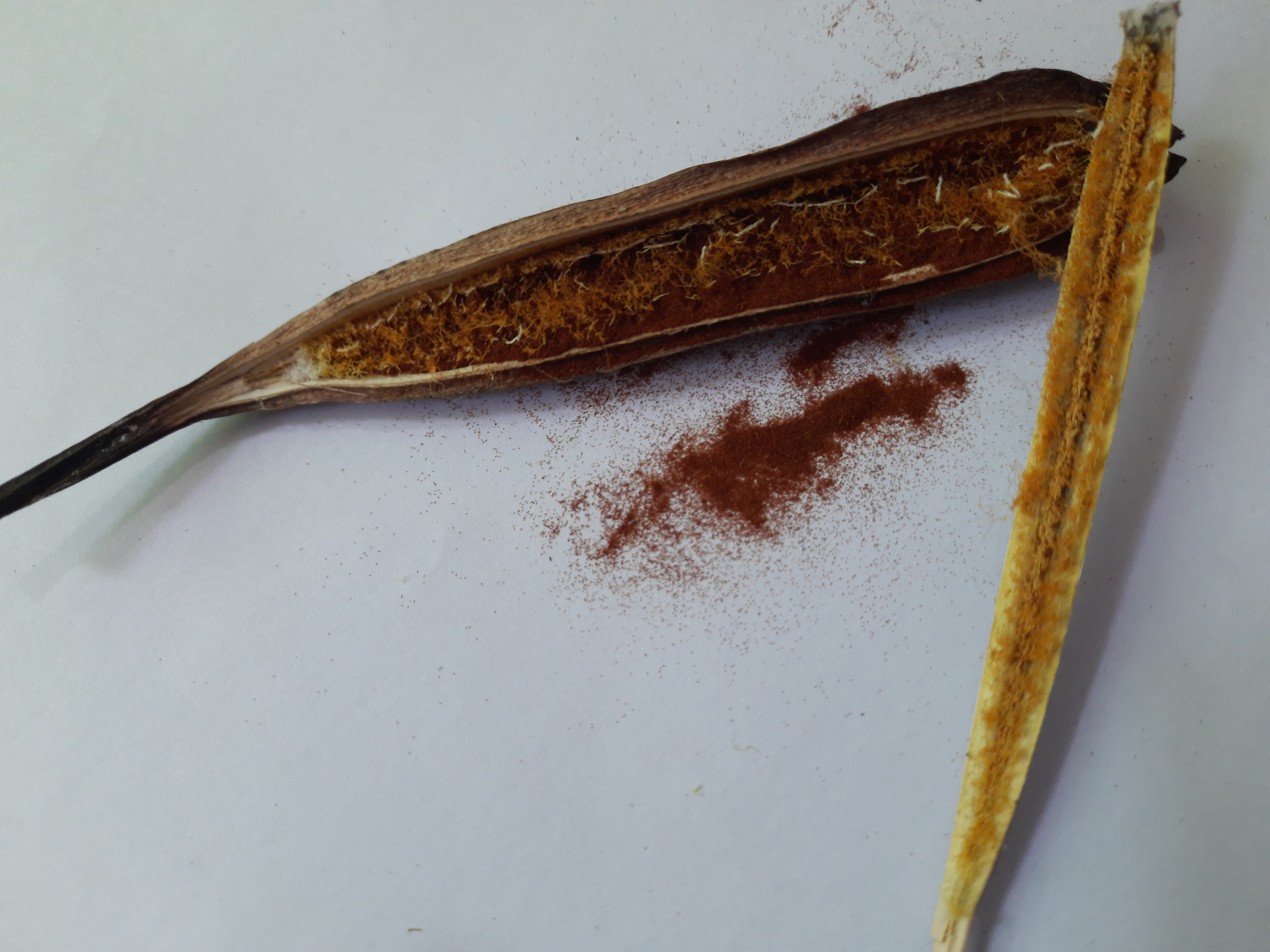
Seeds of Vanda tessellata

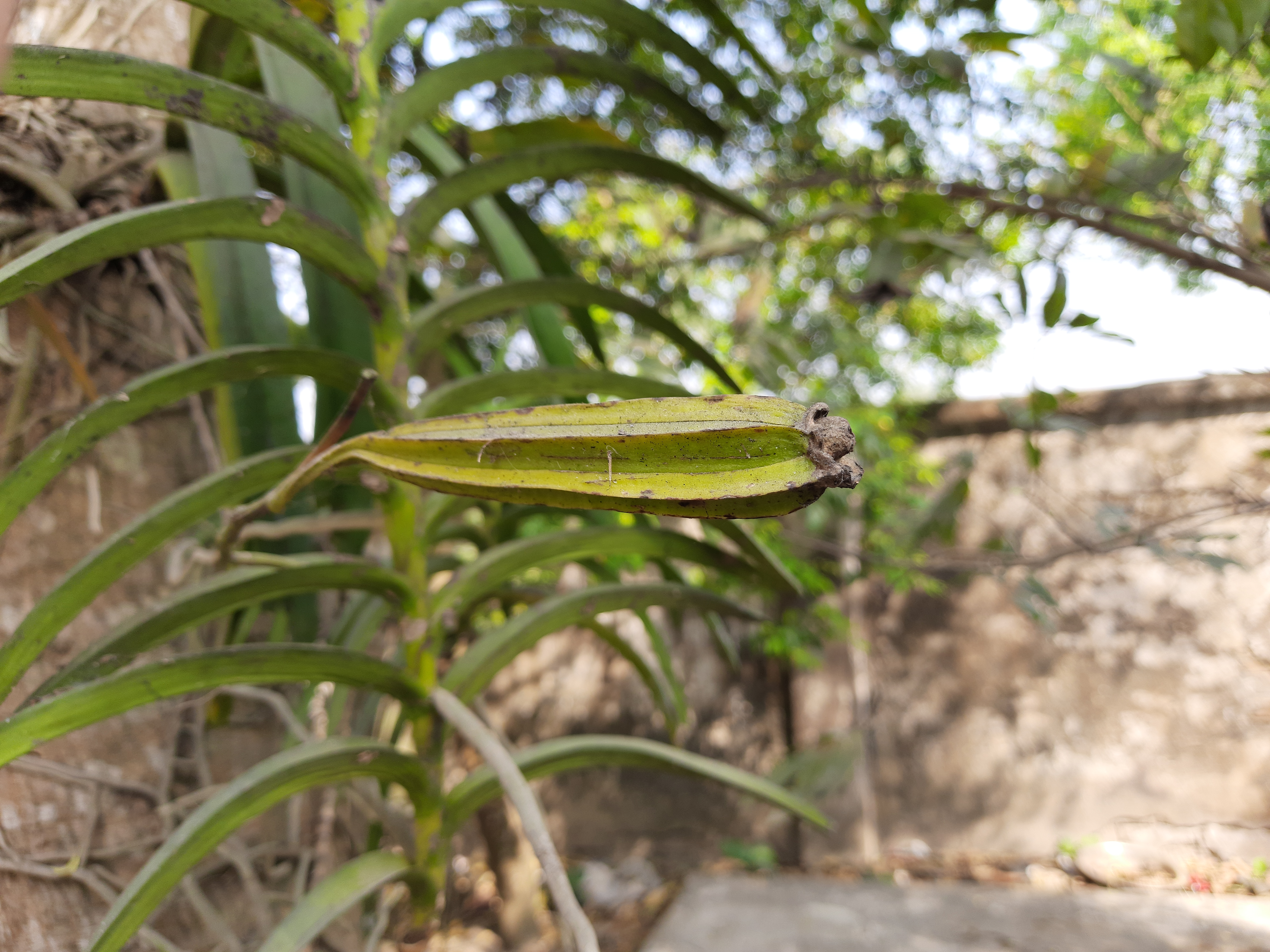
Fruit of Vanda tessellata

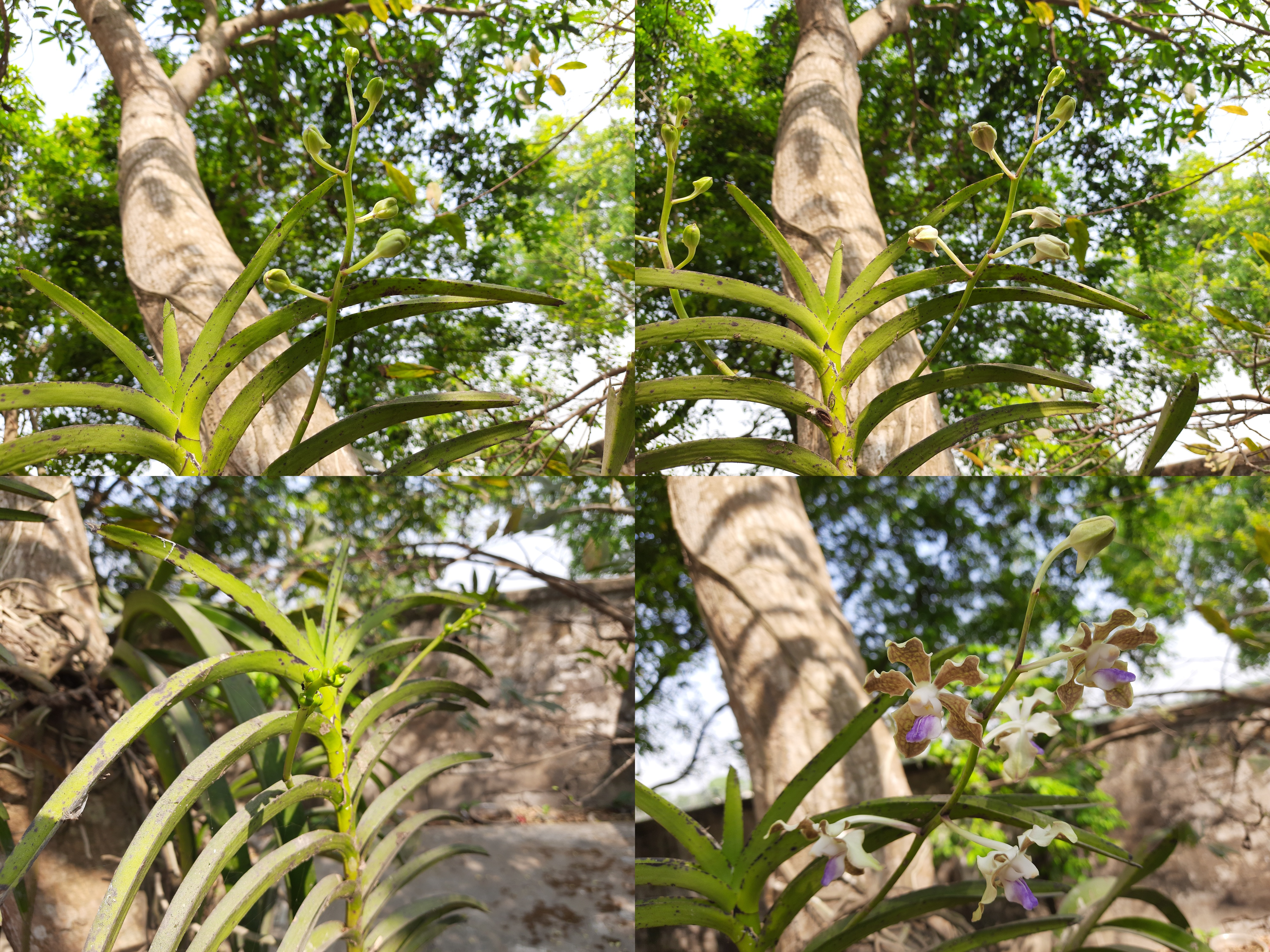
Transformation of Vanda tessellata flowers from buds

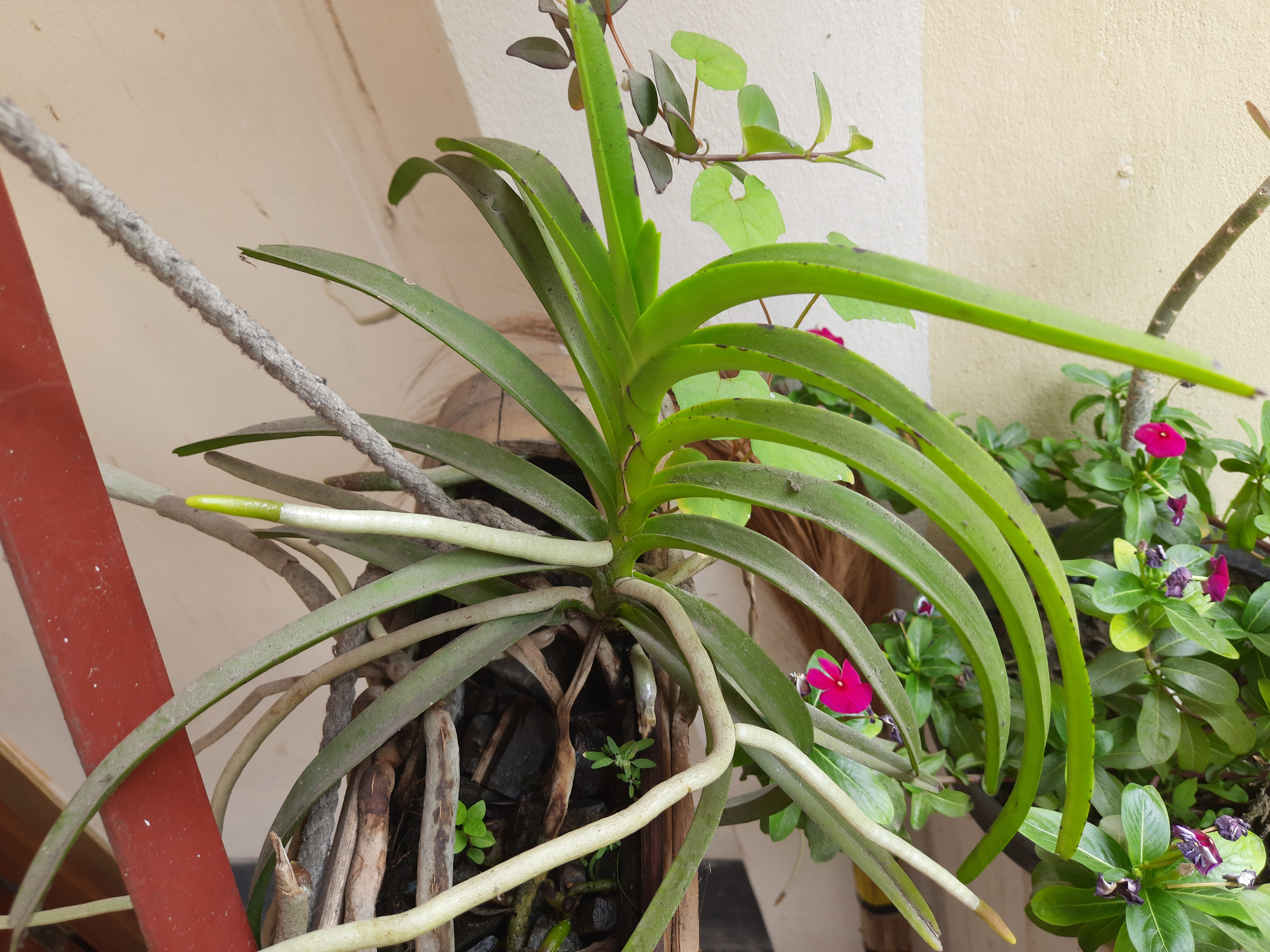
Vanda tessellata plant in a bamboo pot

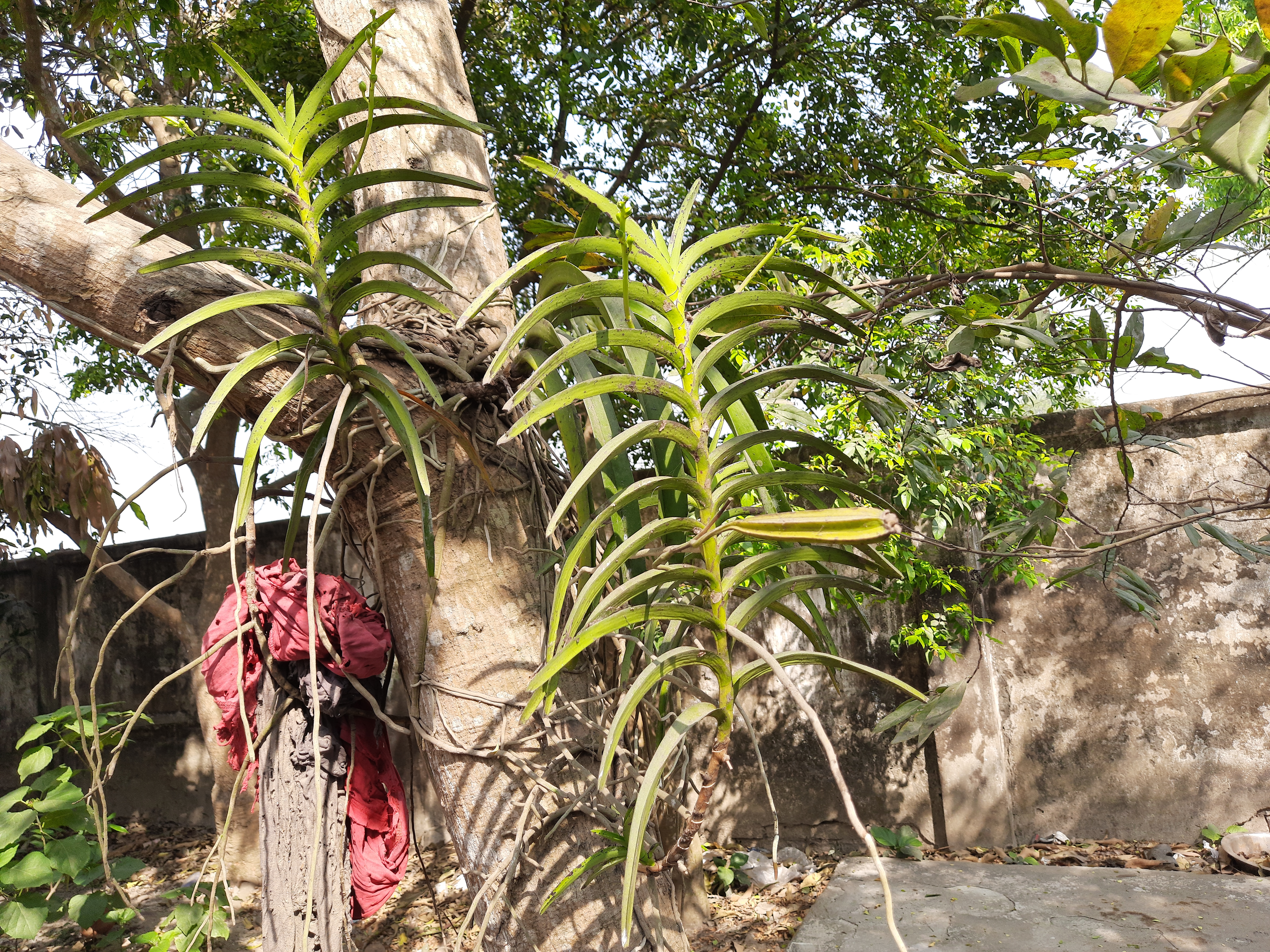
Vanda tessellata plant

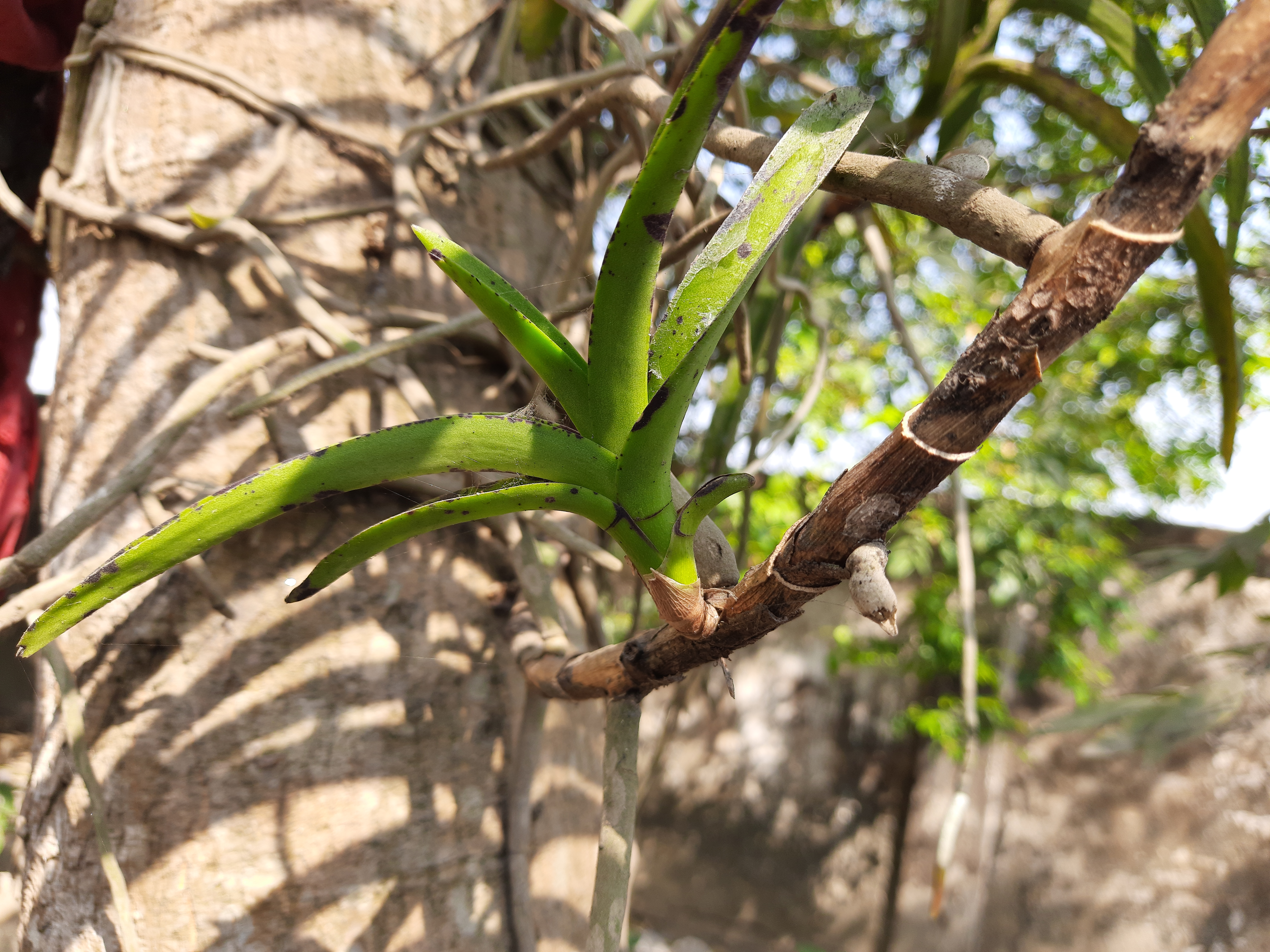
Vegetative reproduction of Vanda tessellata
