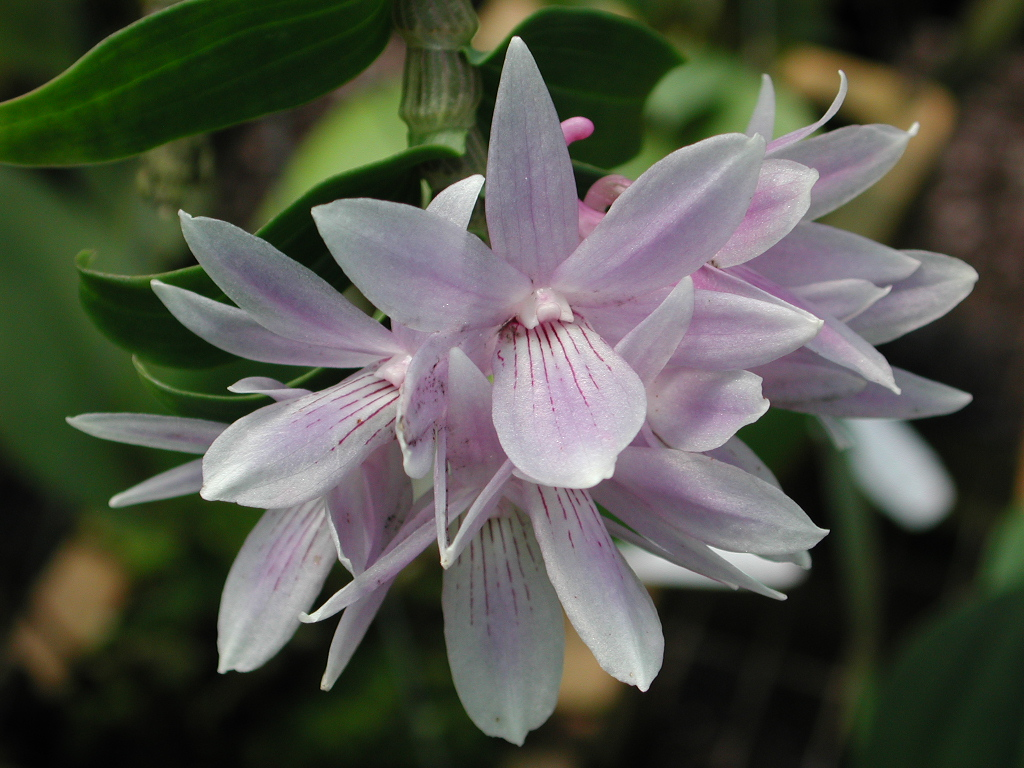

Scientific classification
- Kingdom: Plantae
- Clade: Tracheophytes
- Clade: Angiosperms
- Clade: Monocots
- Order: Asparagales
- Family: Orchidaceae
- Subfamily: Epidendroideae
- Genus: Dendrobium
- Species: D. ceraula

Binomial name
- Dendrobium ceraula Rchb.f (1877)

Synonyms
- Dendrobium gonzalesii Quisumb. (1938)

= Dendrobium ceraula =

Species of orchid

Dendrobium ceraula (horned dendrobium) is a species of orchid endemic to the island of Luzon in the Philippines.
