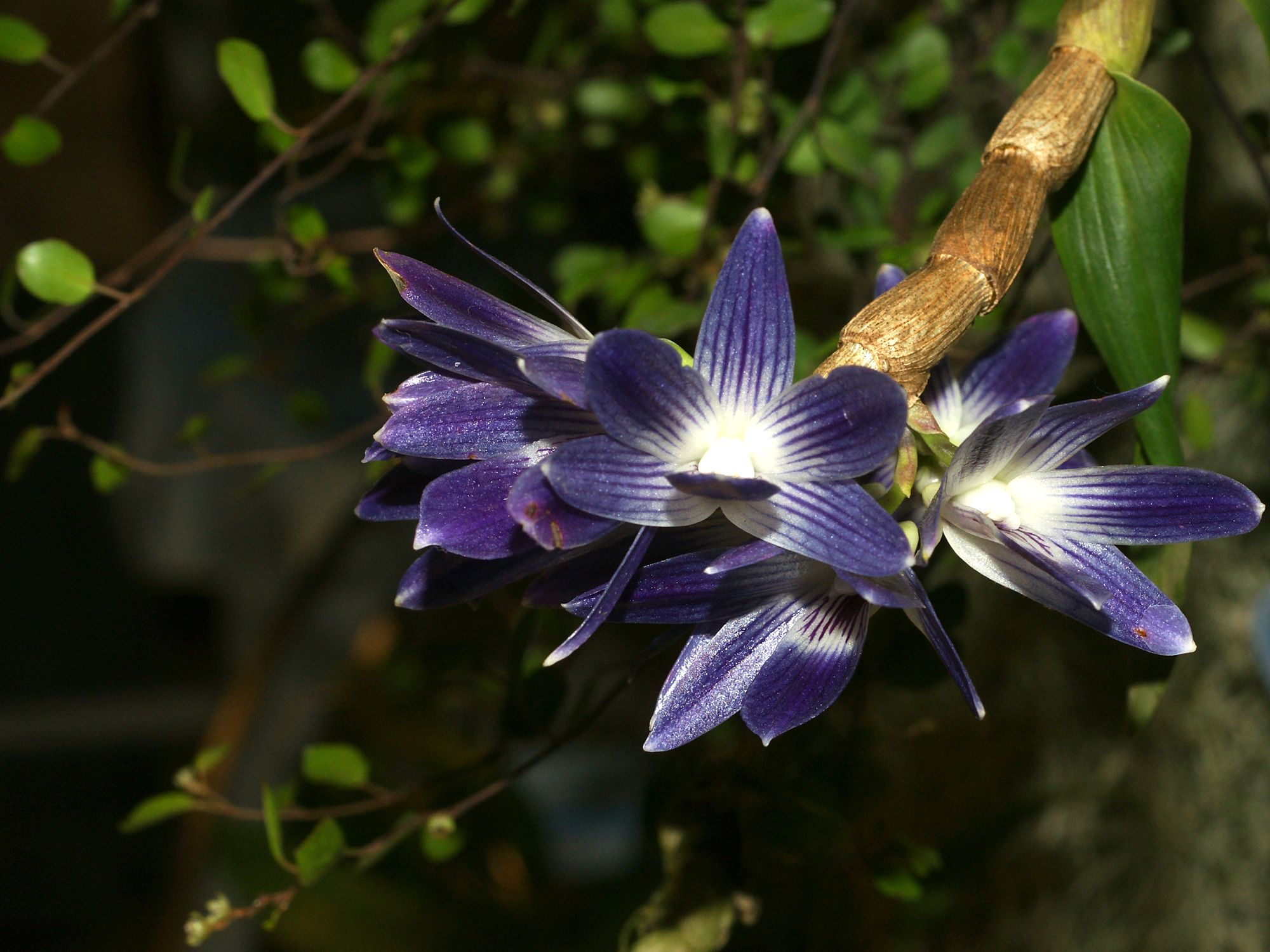

Scientific classification
- Kingdom: Plantae
- Clade: Tracheophytes
- Clade: Angiosperms
- Clade: Monocots
- Order: Asparagales
- Family: Orchidaceae
- Subfamily: Epidendroideae
- Genus: Dendrobium
- Species: D. victoriae-reginae

Binomial name
- Dendrobium victoriae-reginae Loher

Synonyms
- Dendrobium coeleste Loher; Dendrobium victoriae-reginae f. album Valmayor & Tiu; Pedilonum victoriae-reginae (Loher) Rauschert

= Dendrobium victoriae-reginae =

Queen Victoria's dendrobium

Species of orchid

Dendrobium victoriae-reginae (Queen Victoria's dendrobium) is a member of the family Orchidaceae endemic to the Philippines.

Dendrobium victoriae-reginae is a small to medium-sized, warm to cold growing epiphyte with thin, descending, clumping pseudobulbs that rarely branch and carry many, unsubdivided, pointed papery leaves, and inflorescences that are violet or purple with darker tip and white center of 3 to 4 centimeters. It is found in the Montane ecoregion of the Philippines growing on moss covered trucks of Lithocarpus species at 1300 to 2700 meters in elevation.
