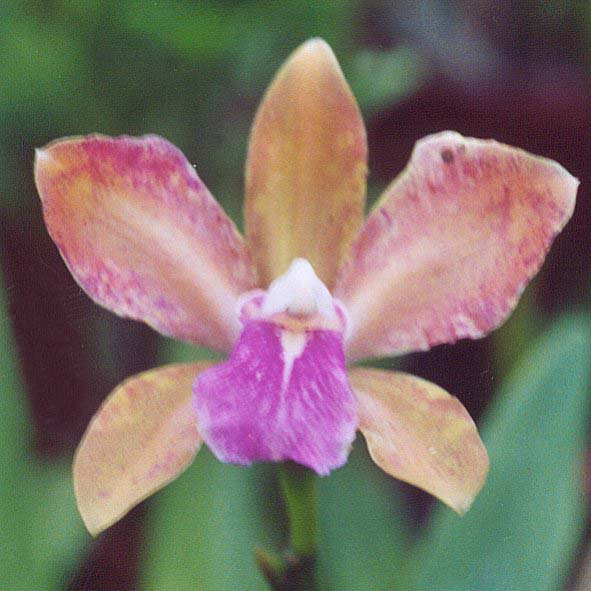

Scientific classification
- Kingdom: Plantae
- Clade: Tracheophytes
- Clade: Angiosperms
- Clade: Monocots
- Order: Asparagales
- Family: Orchidaceae
- Subfamily: Epidendroideae
- Genus: Cattleya
- Subgenus: Cattleya subg. Intermediae
- Species: C. bicolor

Binomial name
- Cattleya bicolor Lindl.

Synonyms
- Cattleya bicolor var. splendida Rchb.f.; Cattleya bicolor var. wrigleyana Rchb.f.; Cattleya bicolor var. mearuresiana B.S. Williams; Cattleya bicolor var. olocheilos Klinge; Cattleya measuresiana (L.O.Williams) Blumensch.

= Cattleya bicolor =

Bicolored cattleya

Species of orchid

Cattleya bicolor is a species of orchid found in Brazil.

Chromosome numbers of several C. bicolor individuals have been determined, finding chromosome numbers of both 2n = 40 and 4n = 80 (tetraploid).
