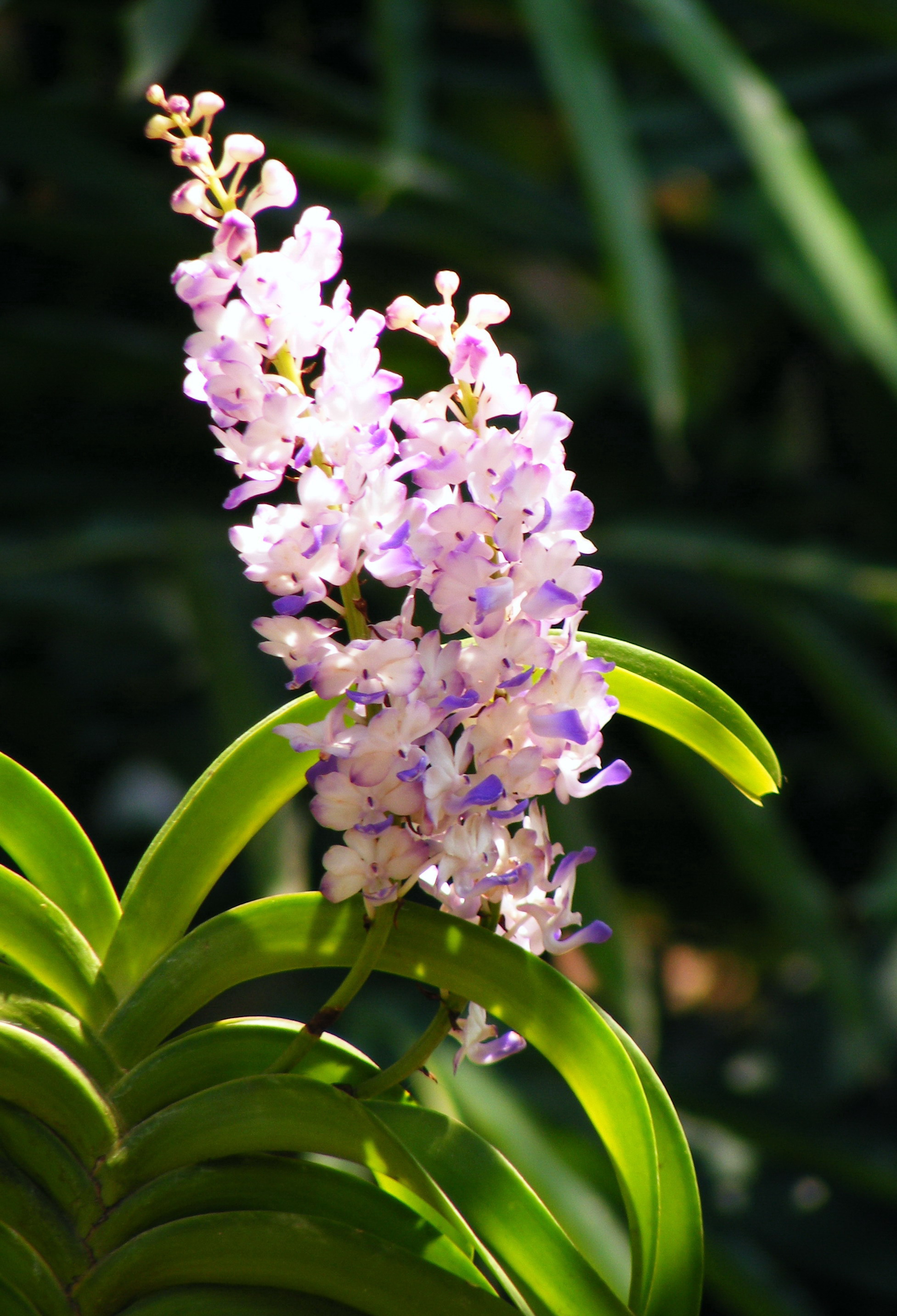

Scientific classification
- Kingdom: Plantae
- Clade: Tracheophytes
- Clade: Angiosperms
- Clade: Monocots
- Order: Asparagales
- Family: Orchidaceae
- Subfamily: Epidendroideae
- Genus: Vanda
- Species: V. coelestis

Binomial name
- Vanda coelestis (Rchb.f.) Motes

Synonyms
- Saccolabium coeleste Rchb.f. (basionym); Vanda pseudocaerulescens Guillaumin; Rhynchostylis coelestis (Rchb.f.) A.H.Kent

= Vanda coelestis =

Species of orchid

Vanda coelestis is a species of orchid native to Cambodia, Thailand and Vietnam.

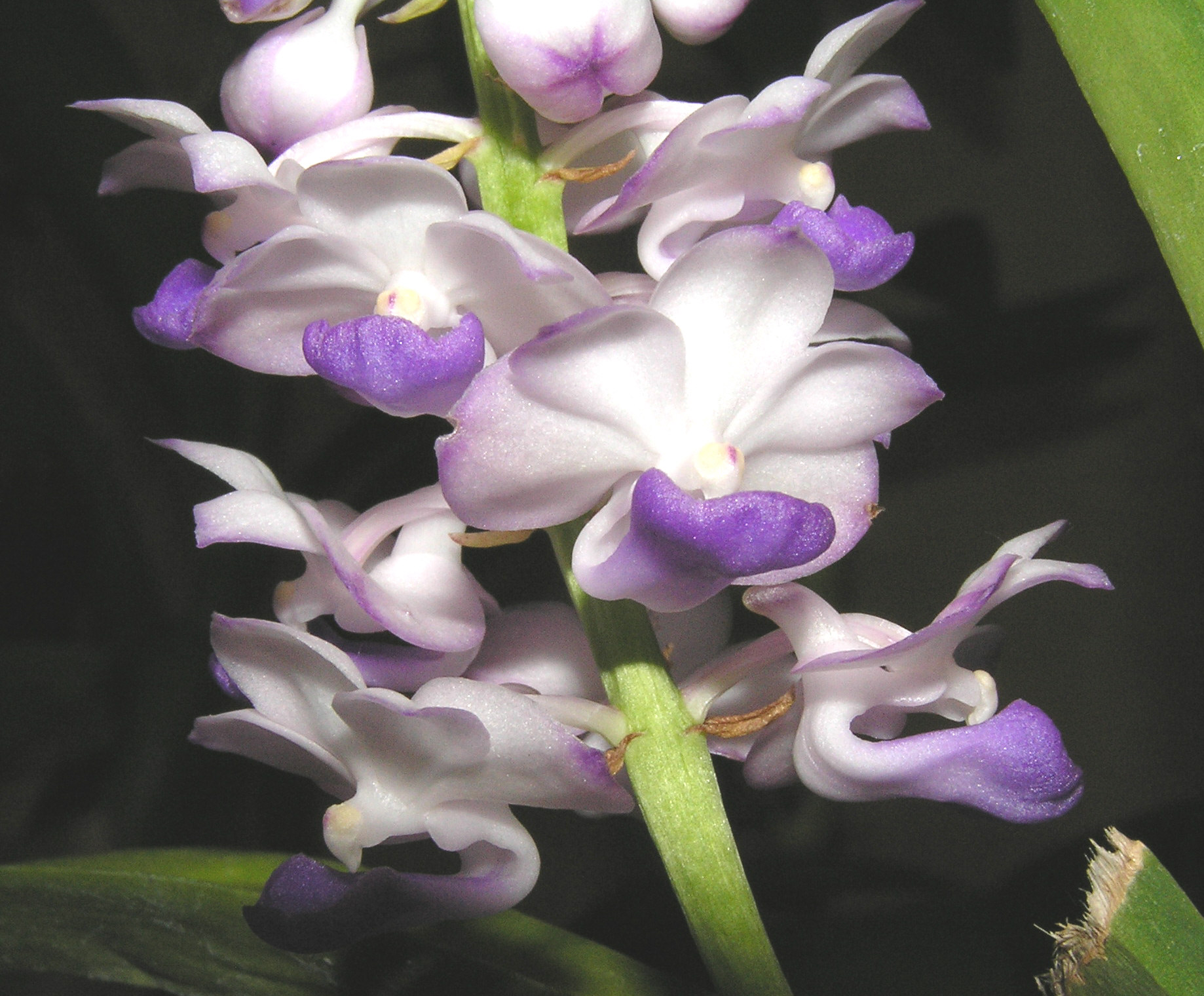
Closeup view of Vanda coelestis inflorescence

== Description ==
These epiphytic herbs form distiched, hard, deeply grooved, arching leaves that are up to 17 cm long and 2 cm wide. The branched stems can grow up to 10-25 cm tall. The 20 to 50 fragrant, white, pink or blue flowers, 2.2 cm wide, are in dense, upright racemes. The spur is flat but the distal half is curved forward.

== Cytology ==
The chromosome count of Vanda coelestis is 2n = 38.

== Taxonomy ==
The former placement of this species within Rhynchostylis has been disputed. One study identifies this species as the sister group to all other Rhynchostylis species on the basis of Amplified Fragment Length Polymorphism.

== Etymology ==
The specific epithet coelestis, derived from the Latin caelum meaning the sky, heavenly, refers to the blue floral colouration.

== Pollination ==
Pollination occurs during daytime through bees.
