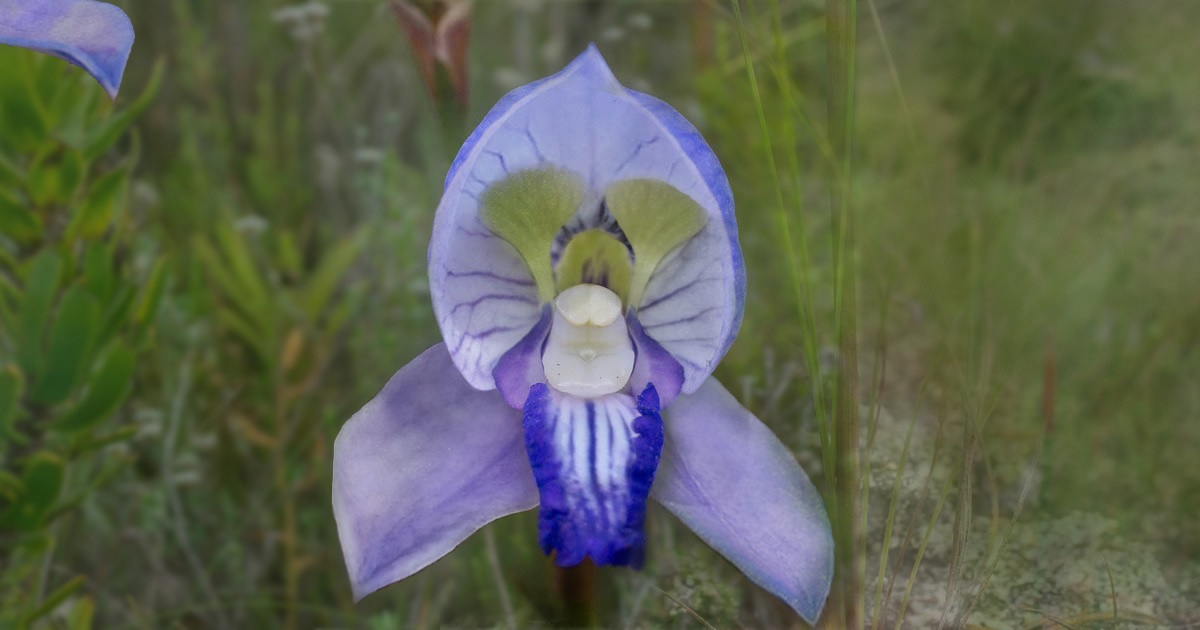

Scientific classification
- Kingdom: Plantae
- Clade: Tracheophytes
- Clade: Angiosperms
- Clade: Monocots
- Order: Asparagales
- Family: Orchidaceae
- Subfamily: Orchidoideae
- Genus: Disa
- Species: D. purpurascens

Binomial name
- Disa purpurascens Bolus

Synonyms
- Herschelia purpurascens (Bolus) Kraenzl.; Herschelianthe purpurascens (Bolus) Rauschert

= Disa purpurascens =

Species of orchid

Disa purpurascens is a species of orchid found in South Africa (SW. Cape Prov.). It is also known as the early blue disa or the bloumoederkappie.

== Description ==
Plants are 200–250 mm (7.9–9.8 in) tall, growing from a tuber with a length of about 30 mm (1.2 in) and a diameter of about 10 mm (0.39 in). About 10 narrow, rigid leaves, about half as tall as the plant, grow from a basal rosette. The base of the plant is often surrounded by a sheath of old leaf fibers.

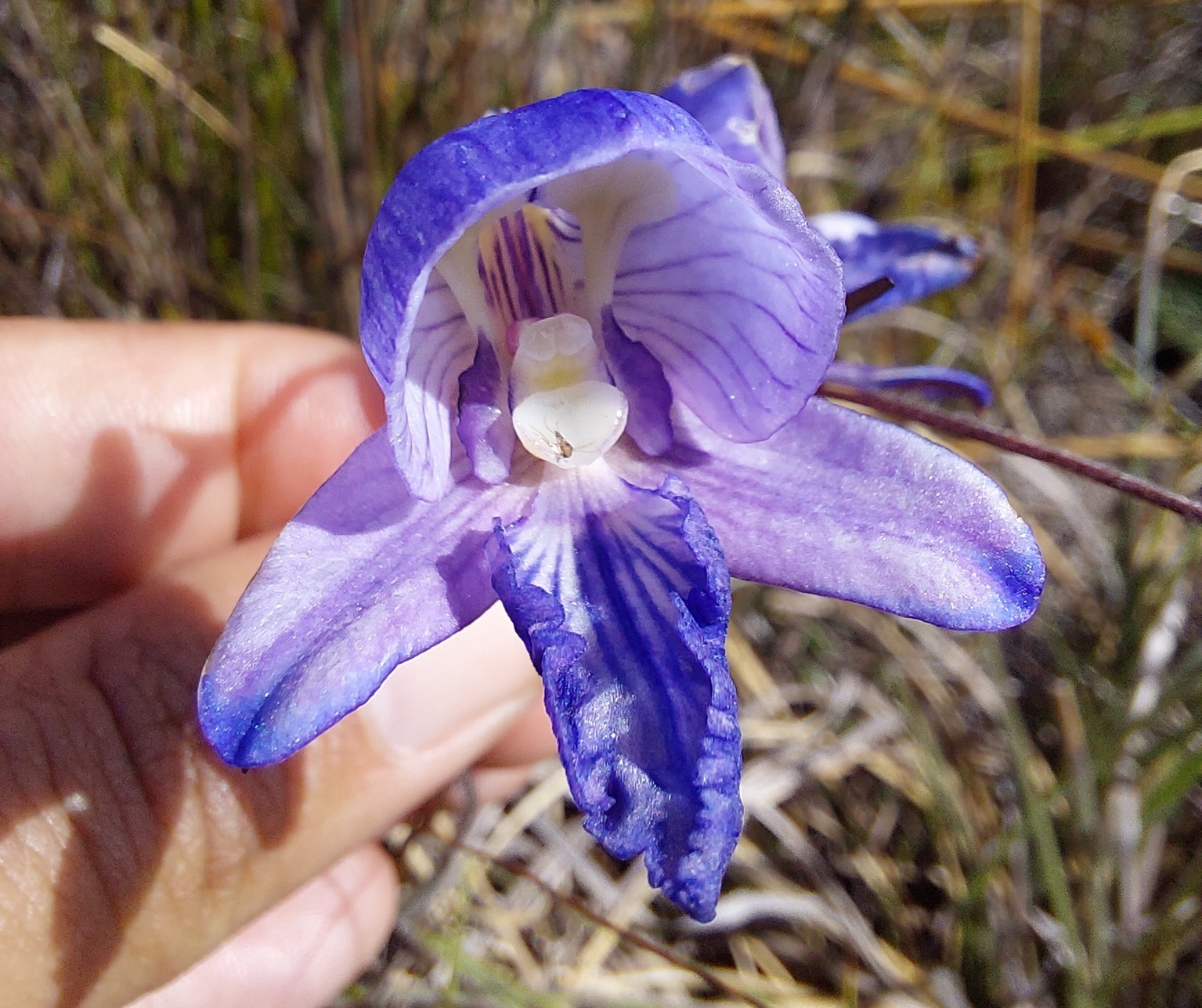
In South Africa

This species flowers in October and November, producing an inflorescence of 1–7 sweetly scented flowers. Each flower has a blue hood and side wings, with a dark purple lip below. Yellow-green petals are found at the back of the hood. While the flowers look similar to those of Disa graminifolia, they differ in having an upcurved lip margin and a conical spur. They also flower at different times of the year.

While there is generally very little variation between plants, some white flowers have been observed. This has been suggested to be a recessive condition.

== Distribution ==
This species has a fairly narrow distribution, growing in coastal regions between Cape Hangklip and Cape Agulhas. It is not thought to occur above 100 m (330 ft) above sea level.
