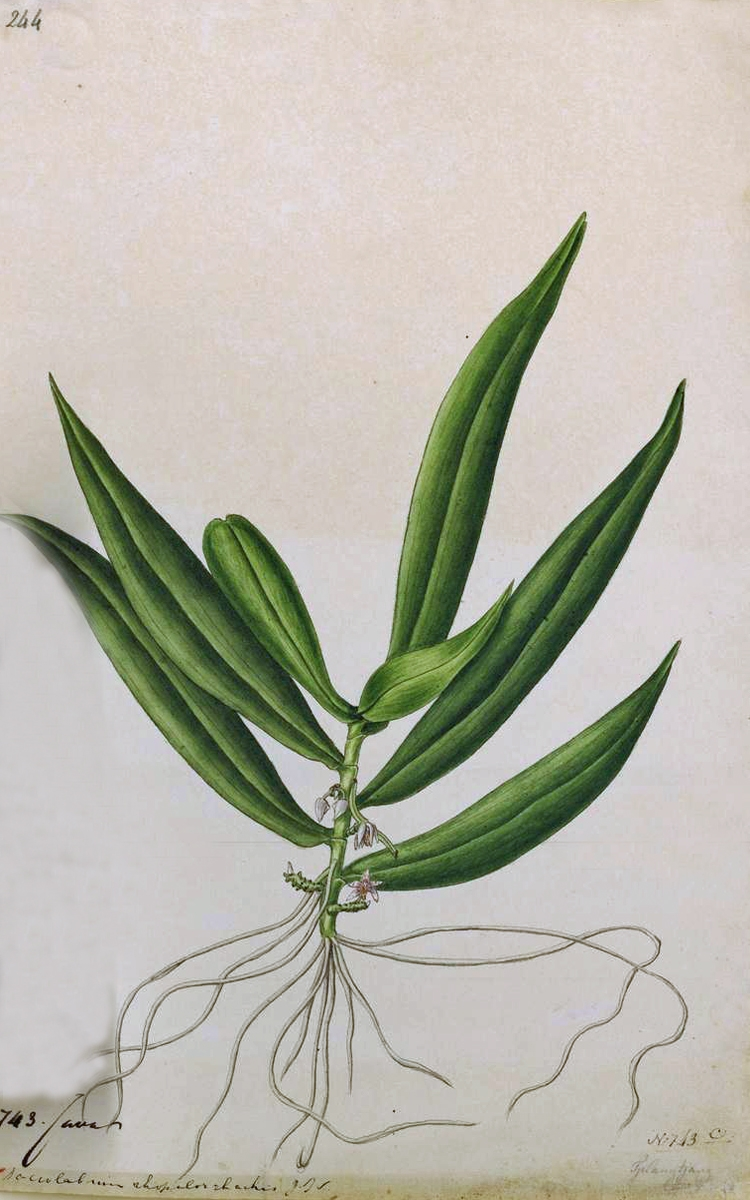
- Illustration of Trachoma rhopalorrhachis by Johannes Jacobus Smith

Scientific classification
- Kingdom: Plantae
- Clade: Tracheophytes
- Clade: Angiosperms
- Clade: Monocots
- Order: Asparagales
- Family: Orchidaceae
- Subfamily: Epidendroideae
- Tribe: Vandeae
- Subtribe: Aeridinae
- Genus: Trachoma; Garay

Type species
- Trachoma rhopalorrhachis (Rchb.f.) Garay

= Trachoma (plant) =

Genus of orchids

Trachoma, commonly known as spectral orchids, is a genus of flowering plants in the family Orchidaceae. Orchids in this genus are epiphytic plants with leafy stems, crowded, leathery leaves arranged in two ranks and a large number of relatively small, short-lived flowers that often open in successive clusters. The sepals and petals are free from and more or less similar to each other, except that the petals are often smaller. The labellum is rigidly fixed to the column and is more or less sac-shaped. There are about 17 species distributed from Assam to the Western Pacific Ocean. Most species grow in rainforests, often on emergent trees such as hoop pine (Araucaria cunninghamii).

== Description ==
Orchids in the genus Trachoma are evergreen, epiphytic, monopodial herbs with long branching roots mostly adhering to the trees on which they grow. The stems are relatively short, thick and leafy. The leaves are leathery, crowded and arranged in two ranks with their bases sheathing the stem. A large number of relatively small resupinate flowers are arranged on a short, sometimes club-shaped flowering stem. The flowers are usually short-lived, sometimes only lasting for a few hours. The sepals are free from and more or less similar to each other. The petals are free from each other and usually narrower than the sepals. The labellum is stiffly attached to the column with a short, sac-like spur and three lobes. The side lobes large and erect, the middle lobe often fleshy.

== Taxonomy and naming ==
The genus Trachoma was first formally described in 1972 by Leslie Andrew Garay in Botanical Museum Leaflets, Harvard University. The name Trachoma is an Ancient Greek words meaning "roughness", referring to "the short inflorescence which is quite rough because of the remnants of densely packed bracts."

Within the family Orchidaceae, the genus is classified in the subfamily Epidendroideae, tribe Vandeae, and subtribe Aeridinae. It is closely related to Tuberolabium.

== Species ==
The following is a list of species of Trachoma recognised by the World Checklist of Selected Plant Families as of January 2019:

- Trachoma binchinae (P.O'Byrne & J.J.Verm.) Kocyan & Schuit. (2014)
- Trachoma brevirhachis (L.O.Williams) Garay (1972)
- Trachoma candida (P.O'Byrne) Kocyan & Schuit. (2014)
- Trachoma celebicum (Schltr.) Garay (1972)
- Trachoma coarctatum (King & Pantl.) Garay (1972)
- Trachoma gamma (P.O'Byrne & J.J.Verm.) Kocyan & Schuit. (2014)
- Trachoma guamense (Ames) Garay, (1972)
- Trachoma latriniformis (P.O'Byrne & J.J.Verm.) Kocyan & Schuit. (2014)
- Trachoma minuta (W.Suarez) Kocyan & Schuit. (2014)
- Trachoma papuanum (Schltr.) M.A.Clem., J.J.Wood & D.L.Jones (1989)
- Trachoma phillipsii (Choltco) Kocyan & Schuit. (2014)
- Trachoma rhopalorrhachis (Rchb.f.) Garay (1972)
- Trachoma rumphii (J.J.Sm.) Kocyan & Schuit. (2014)
- Trachoma sarcochiloides (Schltr.) W.Suarez & Cootes (2007)
- Trachoma sinapicolor (P.O'Byrne & J.J.Verm.) Kocyan & Schuit. (2014)
- Trachoma speciosum D.L.Jones, B.Gray, M.A.Clem. & J.J.Wood (1989)
- Trachoma stellatum M.A.Clem., D.L.Jones, B.Gray & J.J.Wood (1989)

== Distribution and habitat ==
Orchids in the genus Trachoma usually grow in rainforest often on emergent trees such as hoop pine. They are found in Assam, Myanmar, Thailand, Vietnam, Borneo, Java, Peninsular Malaysia, the Maluku Islands, the Philippines, Indonesia, New Guinea, the Solomon Islands, northern Australia, Fiji, Niue, New Caledonia, Vanuatu, the Cook Islands, the Society Islands, Tubuai and the Northern Mariana Islands. Three species occur in Australia and one in New Guinea.
