= List of Phalaenopsis species =

The following is a list of Phalaenopsis species accepted by Plants of the World Online at February 2022:

Image	Name	Distribution	Elevation in metres (m)
	Phalaenopsis amabilis (L.) Blume	East Malaysia to Papuasia	0– 600 m
	Phalaenopsis amboinensis J.J.Smith	Ambon Island, Sulawesi, Papua and New Guinea and Indonesia	
	Phalaenopsis aphrodite Rchb.f	Philippine Islands, Sulu Archipelago, and Taiwan	
	Phalaenopsis appendiculata Carr	Pahang, Malaysia to northeastern Borneo	
	Phalaenopsis bastianii O.Gruss & L.Röllke	the Philippines - Luzon, in the Sulu Archipelago	
	Phalaenopsis bellina Christenson	Borneo	200 m and below
	Phalaenopsis boulbetii (Telepova) J.M.H.Shaw	Cambodia	
	Phalaenopsis buyssoniana Rchb. f.	Indochina, Thailand, and Vietnam	
	Phalaenopsis cacharensis (Barbhuiya, B.K.Dutta & Schuit.) Kocyan & Schuit.	India (Cachar, Assam)	
	Phalaenopsis celebensis Sweet	Sulawesi	
	Phalaenopsis chibae T.Yukawa	Vietnam	400 – 600 m
	Phalaenopsis cochlearis Holttum	Malaysia and Sarawak, Borneo	450 – 700 m
	Phalaenopsis corningiana Rchb. f.	Borneo	450 – 610 m
	Phalaenopsis cornu-cervi (Breda) Blume & Rchb.f.	India, Myanmar, Thailand, Laos, Vietnam, Nicobar Islands, Malaysia, Java, Borneo, Sumatra, and the Philippines	1000 m and below
	Phalaenopsis deliciosa Rchb. f.	India to SE Asia, Java, Sumatra, Borneo and the Philippines	600 m and below
	Phalaenopsis difformis (Wall. ex Lindl.) Kocyan & Schuit.	Assam India, eastern Himalayas, Nepal, western Himalayas, Myanmar, Thailand, Malayasia, Laos, central and southern China, Vietnam, Borneo and Sumatra	300 – 1600 m
	Phalaenopsis doweryensis Garay & Christenson	Sabah	150 m
	Phalaenopsis equestris (Schauer) Rchb.f	Taiwan - Hsiao Lan Yü to the Philippines	0 – 300 m.
	Phalaenopsis fasciata Rchb.f	the Philippines	
	Phalaenopsis fimbriata J.J.Sm.	Java, Sumatra and Sarawak	790 – 1300 m.
	Phalaenopsis finleyi Christenson	Thailand, Myanmar and Vietnam	
	Phalaenopsis floresensis Fowlie	island of Flores in Indonesia	150 – 500 m
	Phalaenopsis fuscata Rchb. f.	Sumatra, Peninsular Malaysia, Borneo, to Philippines - Palawan island	0 – 1000 m
	Phalaenopsis gibbosa H.R.Sweet	Laos, northern Vietnam, South-Central China	0 – 1000 m
	Phalaenopsis gigantea J.J.Smith	Sabah, Borneo, Java and Sarawak	0 – 400 m
	Phalaenopsis hieroglyphica (Rchb.f) Sweet 1969	the Philippines - Luzon, Leyte, Samar, Palawan, and Mindanao islands	
	Phalaenopsis honghenensis F.Y. Liu	Yunnan, China and Vietnam	2000 m
	Phalaenopsis hygrochila J.M.H.Shaw	Assam, China South-Central, East Himalaya, Laos, Myanmar, Thailand, Vietnam	700–1300 m
	Phalaenopsis inscriptiosinensis Fowlie	Central Sumatra	914 m and below
	Phalaenopsis japonica (Rchb.f.) Kocyan & Schuit.	W Yunnan, Zhejiang, Japan (Southern areas to Ryukyu Islands), Korea (Jeollanam-do).	600 – 1400 m
	Phalaenopsis javanica J.J.Sm.	Western Java	
	Phalaenopsis kapuasensis Metusala & P.O'Byrne	Kapuas Hulu, West Kalimantan Province, Indonesia	50 – 200 m
	Phalaenopsis kunstleri Hook.f.	Myanmar to Malaysia	
	Phalaenopsis lindenii Loher	the Philippines - Luzon island	1000 – 1500 m
	Phalaenopsis lobbii (Rchb.f.) H.R.Sweet	Himalayas, NE India, Bhutan, Sikkim, Myanmar and Vietnam	366 – 1200 m
	Phalaenopsis lowii Rchb.f	Myanmar, Thailand and Borneo	800 m.
	Phalaenopsis lueddemanniana Rchb.f	the Philippines	below 100 m.
	Phalaenopsis luteola (Burb. ex Garay) Christenson & O.Gruss	Northwestern Borneo	
	Phalaenopsis maculata Rchb.f	Malaya to Borneo and Sulawesi	0 – 1000 m
	Phalaenopsis malipoensis Z.J.Liu & S.C.Chen	China - Yunnan and Vietnam	
	Phalaenopsis mannii Rchb.f	Indian Himalayas, Assam, Nepal, Bhutan, Sikkim, Myanmar, southern China and Vietnam	500 – 1500 m
	Phalaenopsis mariae Burbidge ex Warner & Williams	Northeastern Borneo to the Philippines - Mindanao	600 m
	Phalaenopsis marriottiana (Rchb.f.) Kocyan & Schuit.	Guangxi China and Myanmar	1300 m
	Phalaenopsis mentawaiensis O.Gruss	Mentawai Islands of Sumatra	
	Phalaenopsis micholitzii Rchb.f.	the Philippines - Mindanao island	400 m
	Phalaenopsis mirabilis (Seidenf.) Schuit.	Thailand and Vietnam	680–1300 m
	Phalaenopsis modesta J.J.Sm.	Borneo	50 – 900 m
	Phalaenopsis mysorensis C.J.Saldanha	Mysore, India and Sri Lanka	
	Phalaenopsis natmataungensis (T.Yukawa, Nob.Tanaka & J.Murata) Dalström & Ormerod	Myanmar	1700 – 1950 m
	Phalaenopsis pallens (Lindley) Rchb.f	the Philippines - Luzon and Mindanao islands	500 m
	Phalaenopsis pantherina Rchb.f.	Borneo	0 – 800 m.
	Phalaenopsis parishii Rchb.f.	eastern Himalayas, Assam India, Myanmar, Thailand and Vietnam	below 500 m
	Phalaenopsis philippinensis Golamco ex Fowlie & C.Z.Tang	the Philippines - Luzon island	up to 1200 m
	Phalaenopsis pulcherrima (Lindl.) J.J.Sm.	Assam India, Myanmar, Thailand, Malaysia, Laos, Cambodia, Yunnan and Xizang China, Vietnam, Borneo and Sumatra	
	Phalaenopsis pulchra (Rchb.f.) H.R.Sweet	the Philippines - Luzon island	100 – 650 m
	Phalaenopsis reichenbachiana Rchb.f. & Sander	the Philippines - Mindanao island	
	Phalaenopsis robinsonii J.J.Sm.	Ambon, Maluku. the Moluccas	
	Phalaenopsis rundumensis P.J.Cribb & A.L.Lamb	Sabah	
	Phalaenopsis sanderiana Rchb.f.	the Philippines - Mindanao island	
	Phalaenopsis schilleriana Rchb.f	the Philippines - Luzon, Mindoro, and Biliran islands	0 – 450 m
	Phalaenopsis stobartiana Rchb.f.	China - southeastern Tibet to Guangxi	
	Phalaenopsis stuartiana Rchb.f.	the Philippines - Mindanao island	below 300 m
	Phalaenopsis subparishii (Z.H.Tsi) Kocyan & Schuit..	N Fujian, N Guangdong, NE Guizhou, SW Hubei, Hunan, NE Sichuan, Zhejiang.	300 – 1100 m
	Phalaenopsis sumatrana Korth. & Rchb.f.	Indochina, Borneo to Philippines - Palawan island	700 m
	Phalaenopsis taenialis (Lindl.) Christenson & Pradhan 1986	Himalayas, Assam India, Nepal, Bhutan, Sikkim, Myanmar, to China - Yunnan	1000 – 2500 m
	Phalaenopsis tetraspis Rchb.f.	Andaman and Nicobar Islands to northwestern Sumatra	0 m.
	Phalaenopsis thailandica O.Gruss & Roeth	Thailand	
	Phalaenopsis tsii (M.H.Li, Z.J.Liu & S.R.Lan) Hua Deng, Z.J.Liu & Yan Wang	China (Hunan)	1200 – 1850 m
	Phalaenopsis ubonensis (O.Gruss) J.M.H.Shaw	Thailand and Laos	150–400 m
	Phalaenopsis venosa Shim & Fowlie	Celebes Islands, Sulawesi	450–1000 m.
	Phalaenopsis violacea Witte	Malaya to Sumatra	150 m.
	Phalaenopsis viridis J.J.Sm	Sumatra	700 – 1000 m
	Phalaenopsis wilsonii Rolfe	Sichuan, Eastern Tibet, Yunnan, and Guangxi, China, Vietnam, Tibet, Myanmar, India	800 – 2200 m
	Phalaenopsis yingjiangensis (Z.H.Tsi) Kocyan & Schuit.	Yunnan China, Thailand and India	1584 m
	Phalaenopsis zhejiangensis (Z.H.Tsi) Schuit.	Zhejiang China	300 – 900 m
	Phalaenopsis × amphitrite Kraenzl.	Mindanao, Philippines	
	Phalaenopsis × gersenii (Teijsm. & Binn.) Rolfe	Borneo and Sumatra	
	Phalaenopsis × intermedia Lindl.	Philippines	
	Phalaenopsis × leucorrhoda Rchb.f.	Philippines	
	Phalaenopsis × lotubela O.Gruss, Cavestro & G.Benk	Sumatra	
	Phalaenopsis × rolfeana H.R.Sweet	Philippines	
	Phalaenopsis × singuliflora J.J.Sm.	Borneo	
	Phalaenopsis × valentinii Rchb.f.	Malaya	
	Phalaenopsis × veitchiana Rchb.f.	Philippines	

== Newly described species ==
Several new species have been described recently and are listed as accepted species in the database of Kew, Plants of the World Online.

- Phalaenopsis arunachalensis K.Gogoi & Rinya (2020)
- Phalaenopsis putaoensis X.H.Jin & H.A.Mung (2021)
- Phalaenopsis yarlungzangboensis (2022) (first suggested name for Phalaenopsis medogensis)
- Phalaenopsis medogensis X.H. Jin & C.B. Ma (2022)

== Intergeneric hybrids ==
The following is a list of intergeneric hybrids recognised by the Royal Horticultural Society that includes species of Phalaenopsis as ancestors, as at February 2022:

- × Aeridopsis (Aerides × Phalaenopsis)
- × Arachnopsis (Arachnis × Phalaenopsis)
- × Cleisonopsis (Cleisocentron × Phalaenopsis)
- × Diplonopsis (Diploprora × Phalaenopsis)
- × Edeara (Arachnis × Phalaenopsis × Renanthera × Vandopsis)
- × Ernestara (Phalaenopsis × Renanthera × Vandopsis)
- × Eurynopsis (Eurychone × Phalaenopsis)
- × Laycockara (Arachnis × Phalaenopsis × Vandopsis)
- × Luinopsis (Luisia × Phalaenopsis)
- × Lutherara (Phalaenopsis × Renanthera × Rhynchostylis )
- × Macekara (Arachnis × Phalaenopsis × Renanthera × Vanda × Vandopsis)
- × Moirara (Phalaenopsis × Renanthera × Vanda)
- × Parnataara (Aerides × Arachnis × Phalaenopsis)
- × Phalaerianda (Aerides × Phalaenopsis × Vanda)
- × Phalandopsis (Phalaenopsis × Vandopsis)
- × Phalphalaenopsis (Phalaenopsis × Paraphalaenopsis)
- × Renanthopsis (Phalaenopsis × Renanthera )
- × Rhynchonopsis (Phalaenopsis × Rhynchostylis)
- × Sappanara (Arachnis × Phalaenopsis × Renanthera)
- × Sarconopsis (Phalaenopsis × Sarcochilus)
- × Trevorara (Arachnis × Phalaenopsis × Vanda)
- × Trichonopsis (Phalaenopsis × Trichoglottis)
- × Uptonara (Phalaenopsis × Rhynchostylis × Sarcochilus)
- × Vandaenopsis (Phalaenopsis × Vanda)
- × Yapara (Phalaenopsis × Rhynchostylis × Vanda)
- × Yeepengara (Aerides × Phalaenopsis × Rhynchostylis × Vanda)

The following artificial hybrids are listed at Plants of the World Online, although many of the parent genera are now synonyms of other genera, including Vanda, Renanthera and Phalaenopsis:

- × Asconopsis (Ascocentrum × Phalaenopsis)
- × Beardara (Ascocentrum × Doritis × Phalaenopsis)
- × Bogardara (Ascocentrum × Phalaenopsis × Vanda × Vandopsis)
- × Bokchoonara (Arachnis × Ascocentrum × Phalaenopsis × Vanda)
- × Devereuxara (Ascocentrum × Phalaenopsis × Vanda)
- × Doriellaopsis (Doritis × Kingiella × Phalaenopsis)
- × Doritaenopsis (Doritis × Phalaenopsis)
- × Dresslerara (Ascoglossum × Phalaenopsis × Renanthera )
- × Hagerara (Doritis × Phalaenopsis × Vanda)
- × Hausermannara (Doritis × Phalaenopsis × Vandopsis)
- × Himoriara (Ascocentrum × Phalaenopsis × Rhynchostylis × Vanda)
- × Isaoara (Aerangis × Ascocentrum × Phalaenopsis × Vanda)
- × Lichtara (Doritis × Gastrochilus × Phalaenopsis)
- × Meechaiara (Ascocentrum × Doritis × Phalaenopsis × Rhynchostylis × Vanda)
- × Nakagawaara (Aerides × Doritis × Phalaenopsis)
- × Owensara (Doritis × Phalaenopsis × Renanthera)
- × Paulara (Ascocentrum × Doritis × Phalaenopsis × Renanthera × Vanda)
- × Pepeara (Ascocentrum × Doritis × Phalaenopsis × Renanthera)
- × Phaliella (Kingiella × Phalaenopsis)
- × Pooleara (Ascocentrum × Ascoglossum × Phalaenopsis × Renanthera)
- × Richardmizutaara (Ascocentrum × Phalaenopsis × Vandopsis)
- × Rhyndoropsis (Doritis × Phalaenopsis × Rhynchostylis)
- × Roseara (Doritis × Kingiella × Phalaenopsis × Renanthera)
- × Sidranara (Ascocentrum × Phalaenopsis × Renanthera)
- × Sladeara (Doritis × Phalaenopsis × Sarcochilus)
- × Stamariaara (Ascocentrum × Phalaenopsis × Renanthera × Vanda)
- × Sutingara (Arachnis × Ascocentrum × Phalaenopsis × Vanda × Vandopsis)
- × Trautara (Doritis × Luisia × Phalaenopsis)
- ×Vandewegheara (Ascocentrum × Doritis × Phalaenopsis × Vanda)
