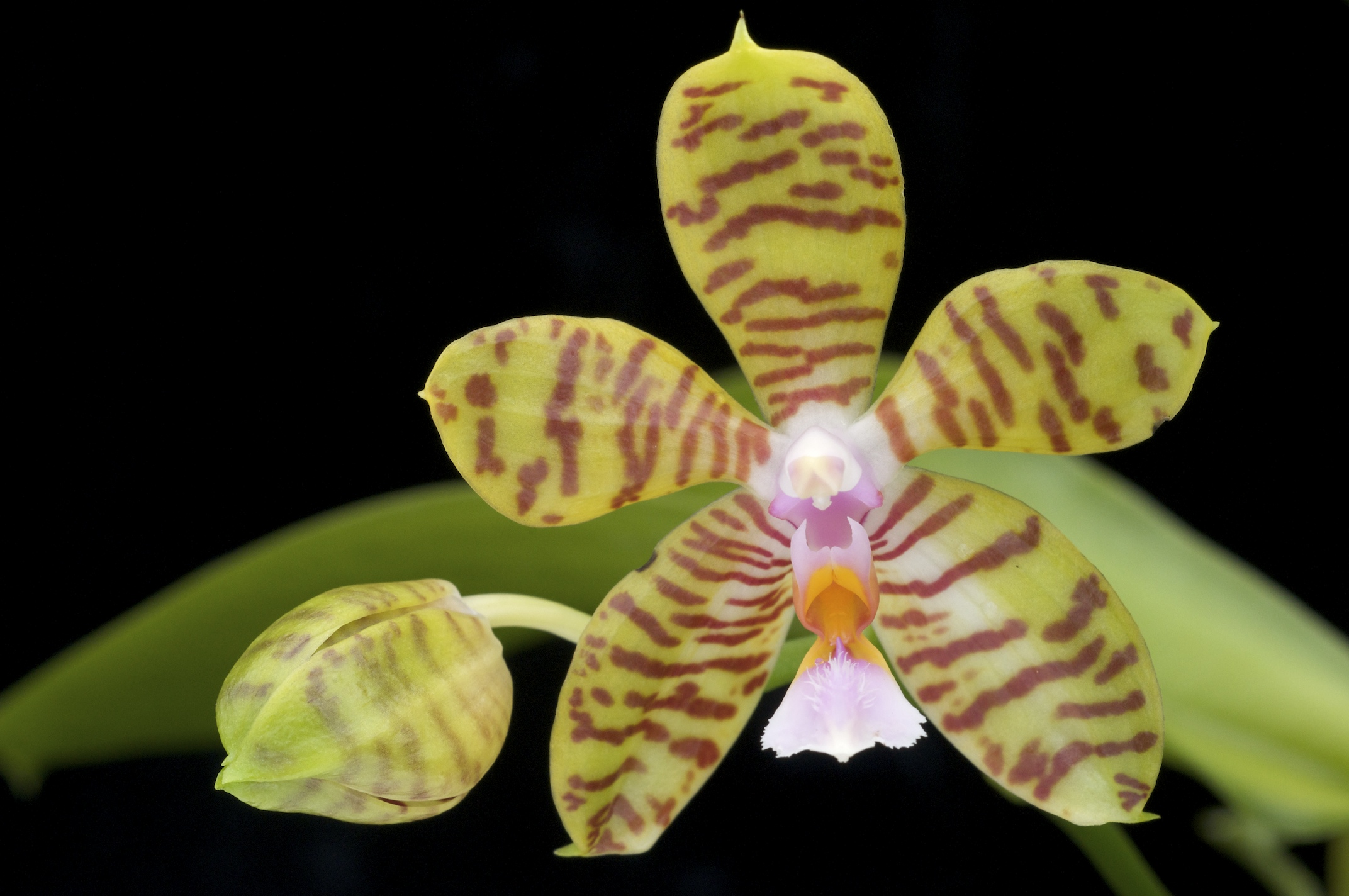

Scientific classification
- Kingdom: Plantae
- Clade: Tracheophytes
- Clade: Angiosperms
- Clade: Monocots
- Order: Asparagales
- Family: Orchidaceae
- Subfamily: Epidendroideae
- Genus: Phalaenopsis
- Species: P. reichenbachiana

Binomial name
- Phalaenopsis reichenbachiana Rchb.f. & Sander 1882

Synonyms
- Phalaenopsis kimbaliana Gower 1888; Phalaenopsis sumatrana var kimbaliana 1888; Polychilos reichenbachiana (Rchb.f. & Sander) Shim 1982

= Phalaenopsis reichenbachiana =

Species of orchid

Phalaenopsis reichenbachiana is an endemic species of orchid from Mindanao island, Philippines. It is near threatened due habitat loss and overcollection. This species is similar to Phalaenopsis fasciata but differs by having a three calluses (triserrate), wide triangular arcuate lip containing hairs (trichomes) in midlobe, the petals and sepals are wide and cuppy and its color usually pale yellow and it has a slightly musky fragrance.
