= Phalaenopsis ubonensis =

- CITES Appendix II (CITES)

Scientific classification
- Kingdom: Plantae
- Clade: Tracheophytes
- Clade: Angiosperms
- Clade: Monocots
- Order: Asparagales
- Family: Orchidaceae
- Subfamily: Epidendroideae
- Genus: Phalaenopsis
- Species: P. ubonensis

Binomial name
- Phalaenopsis ubonensis (O.Gruss) J.M.H.Shaw
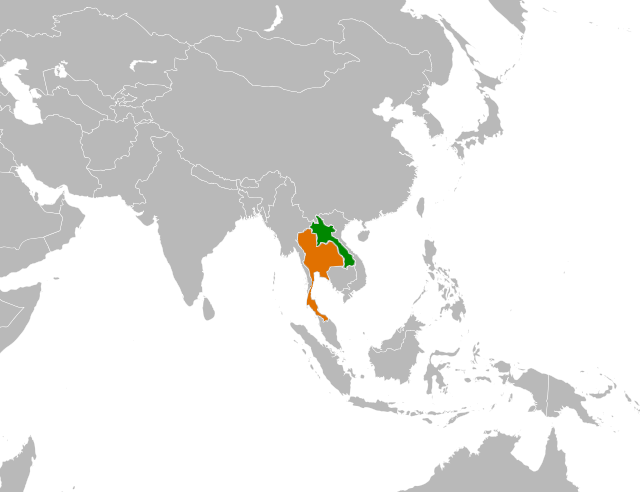
- Distribution of Phalaenopsis ubonensis

Synonyms
- Doritis ubonensis O.Gruss

Species of orchid

Phalaenopsis ubonensis, is a species of orchid native to Thailand and Laos. The specific epithet ubonensis refers to the Thai province Ubon.

== Description ==
This species of miniature, hot-growing, lithophytic orchid bears 6–12 leaves, which are 10–16 cm long, on 10–15 cm long stems. In summer and autumn, axillary, 50–150 cm long, erect, branched inflorescences produce fragrant, lavender, rose or lilac coloured flowers, which are larger than flowers of the allied species Phalaenopsis pulcherrima. The flowers are 5 cm wide.

== Ecology ==
It is found in tropical lowland forests at elevations of 150–400 m above sea level.

== Taxonomy ==
This species has an affinity to Phalaenopsis pulcherrima and Phalaenopsis buyssoniana.
