= × Renanthopsis =

Scientific classification
- Kingdom: Plantae
- Clade: Tracheophytes
- Clade: Angiosperms
- Clade: Monocots
- Order: Asparagales
- Family: Orchidaceae
- Subfamily: Epidendroideae
- Tribe: Vandeae
- Subtribe: Aeridinae
- Genus: × Renanthopsis hort.

× Renanthopsis, abbreviated Rnthps. in the horticultural trade, is the nothogenus for intergeneric hybrids between the orchid genera Phalaenopsis and Renanthera (Phal. × Ren.).
