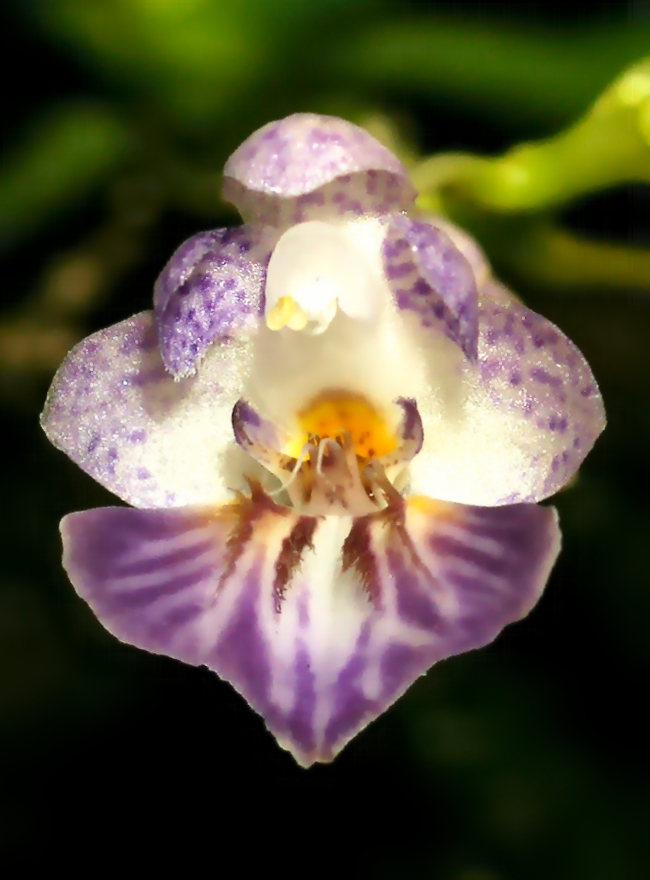
- Flower detail
- CITES Appendix II

Scientific classification
- Kingdom: Plantae
- Clade: Tracheophytes
- Clade: Angiosperms
- Clade: Monocots
- Order: Asparagales
- Family: Orchidaceae
- Subfamily: Epidendroideae
- Genus: Phalaenopsis
- Species: P. appendiculata

Binomial name
- Phalaenopsis appendiculata Carr
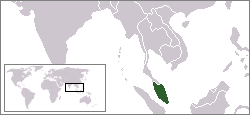
- distribution of Phalaenopsis appendiculata

Synonyms
- Doritis appendiculata (Carr) T.Yukawa & K.Kita; Grussia appendiculata (Carr) M.Wolff; Phalaenopsis appendiculata f. alba O.Gruss & Roeth; Polychilos appendiculata (Carr) Shim

= Phalaenopsis appendiculata =

Species of epiphytic orchid

Phalaenopsis appendiculata is a species of miniature epiphyte in the family Orchidaceae, endemic to peninsular Malaysia.

== Description ==
This species grows on narrow branches. The very short stems bear two to four, elliptic or oblong-elliptic, coriaceous leaves, which may reach up to 7 cm in length and 3.5 cm in width. Spotted, violet flowers are produced in succession on short, few-flowered, suberect racemes. The specific epithet appendiculata refers to the longitudinal rows of appendages on the three-lobed labellum.

== Conservation ==
Artificial asymbiotic seed germination techniques have been studied. Conservation efforts can benefit from artificial propagation of rare and endangered species. Both ex situ and in situ conservation can benefit from in vitro seed germination, as the process increases adaptive evolutionary changes and as a result there is more genetic variation in reintroduced populations.

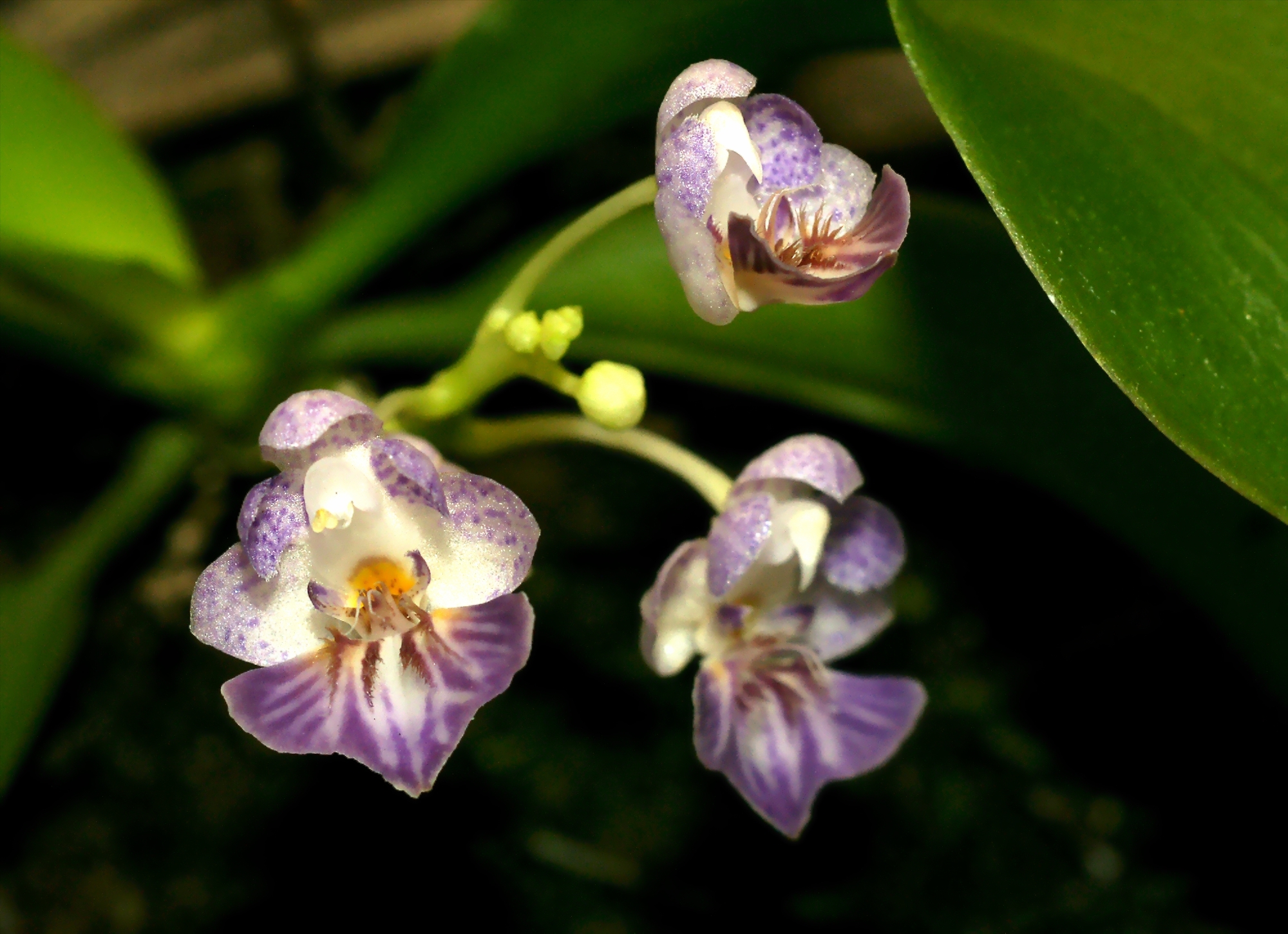

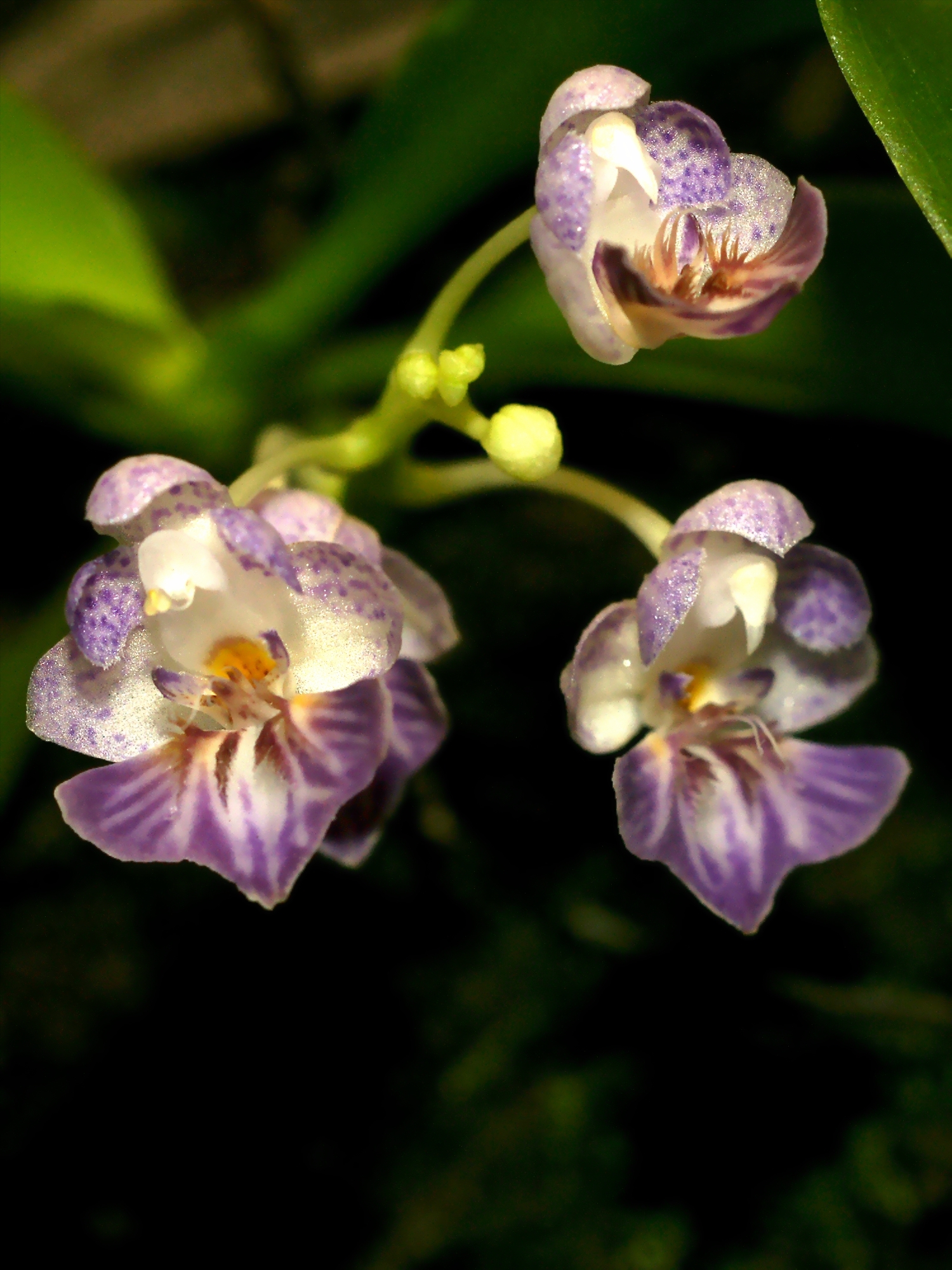
