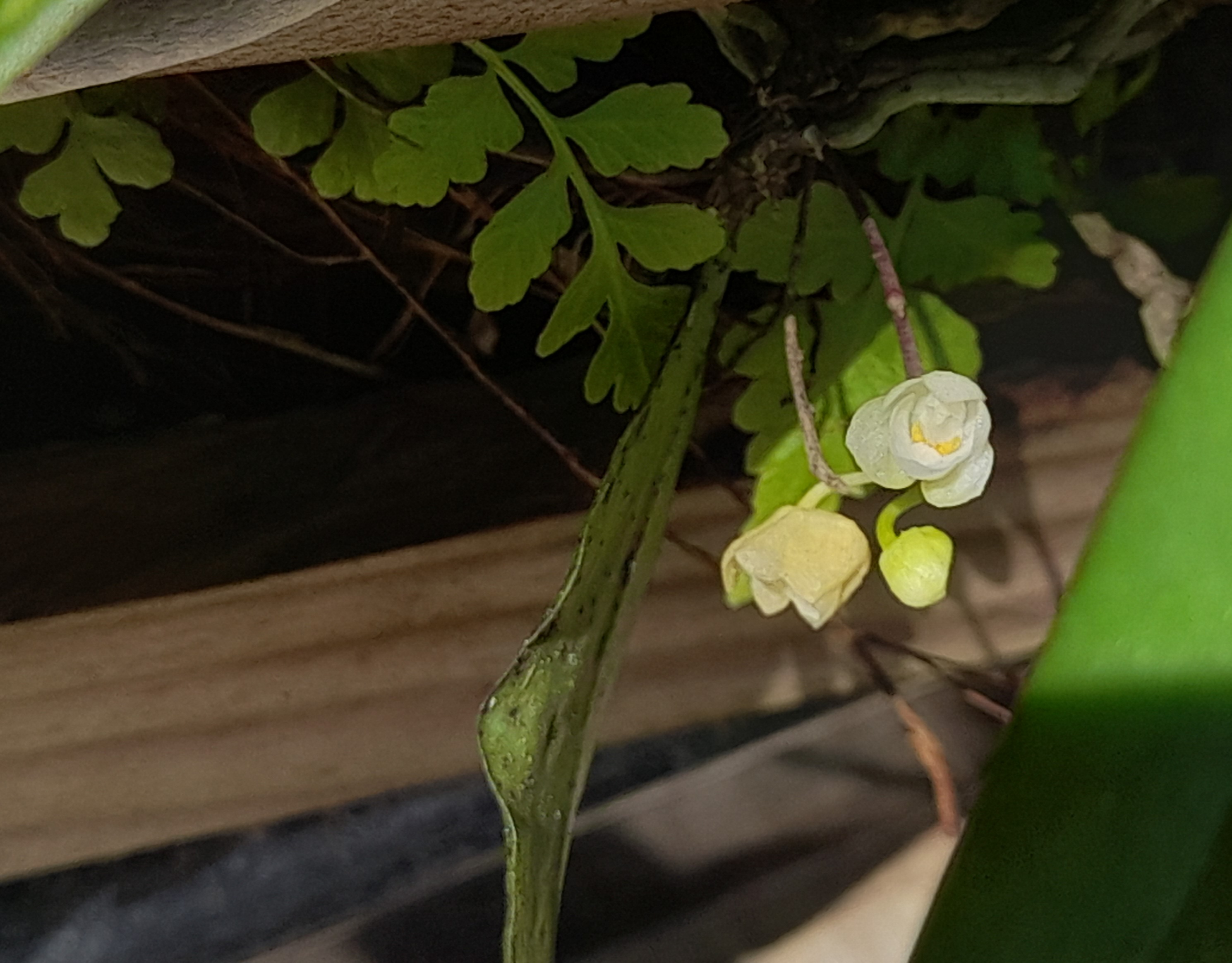

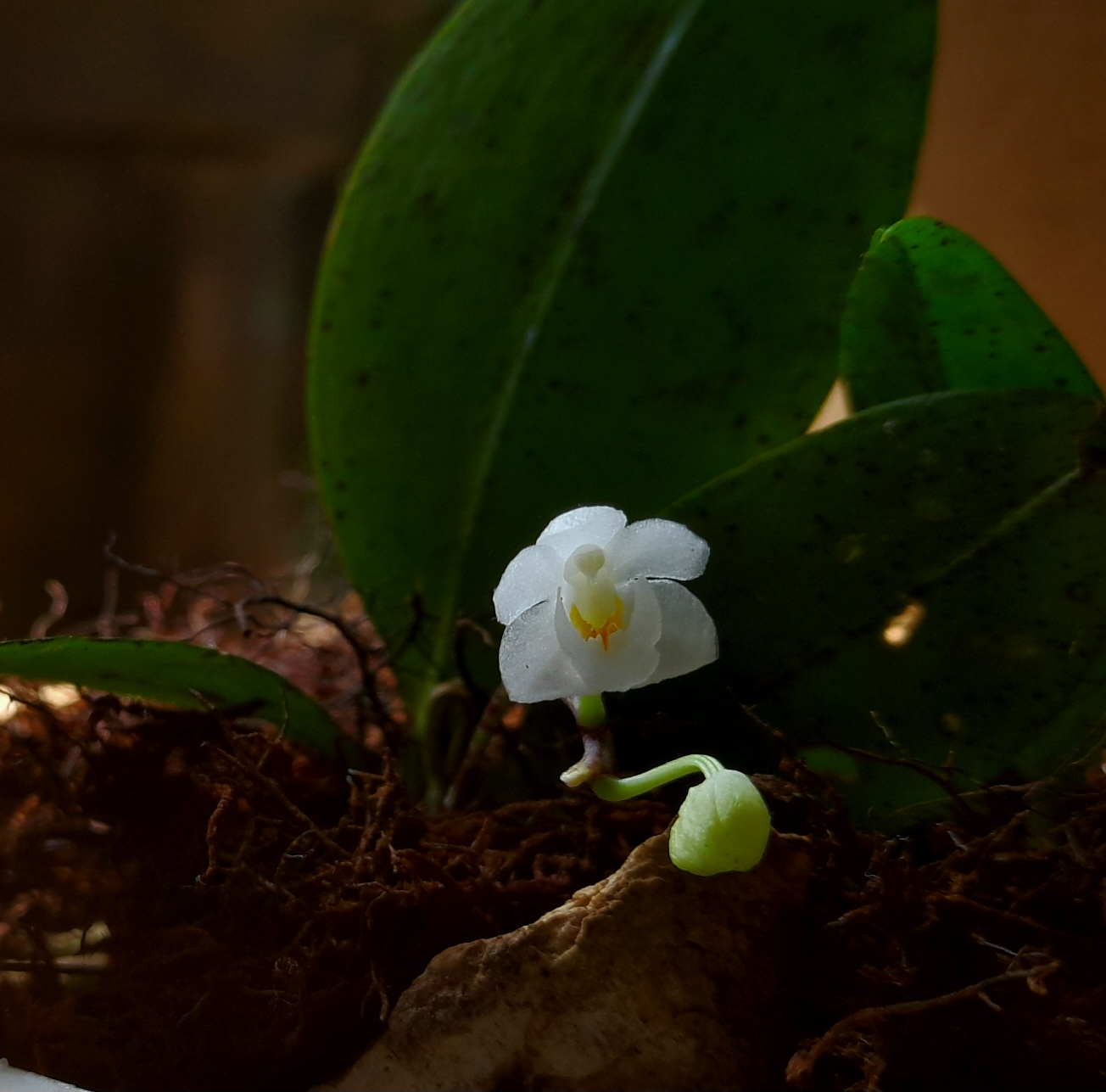
- CITES Appendix II (CITES)

Scientific classification
- Kingdom: Plantae
- Clade: Tracheophytes
- Clade: Angiosperms
- Clade: Monocots
- Order: Asparagales
- Family: Orchidaceae
- Subfamily: Epidendroideae
- Genus: Phalaenopsis
- Species: P. mysorensis

Binomial name
- Phalaenopsis mysorensis C.J.Saldanha
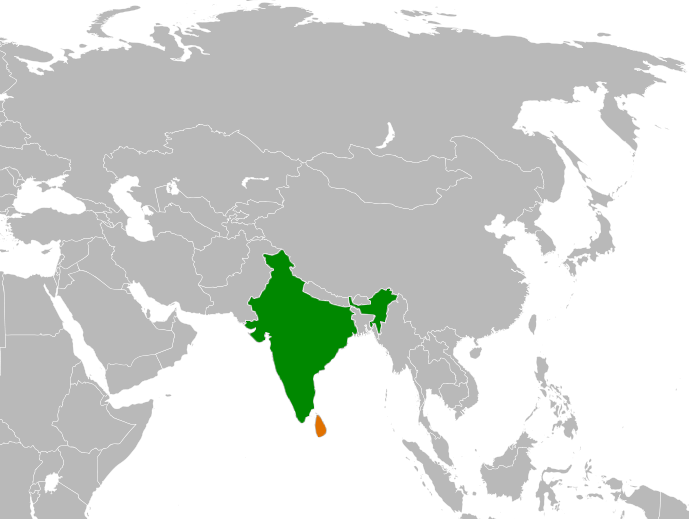
- Distribution of Phalaenopsis mysorensis

Synonyms
- Doritis mysorensis (C.J.Saldanha) T.Yukawa & K.Kita; Kingidium mysorense (C.J.Saldanha) C.S.Kumar; Kingidium niveum C.S.Kumar; Polychilos mysorensis (C.J.Saldanha) Shim

= Phalaenopsis mysorensis =

Species of orchid

Phalaenopsis mysorensis is a species of flowering plant in the orchid family Orchidaceae. It is native to the India and Sri Lanka, and is only rarely found in cultivation. The specific epithet refers to the Indian city Mysore.

== Description ==
It is a miniature epiphytic herb with flat, green roots. Two to four coriaceous, oblong elliptic leaves are formed on a 4.5 to 6.5 mm short stem. The leaves are shed under dry conditions. One to four flowers are formed on axillary, lateral racemes. The flowers are white, rather small (6 – 7 mm in diameter). They resemble flowers of the closely related Phalaenopsis deliciosa. This species is a member of the section Deliciosae of the subgenus Phalaenopsis. It grows on isolated hills in dry and intermediate zones, however there it is found in wet, humid niches on tree trunks and branches, covered in moss, which can retain moisture. Lithophytic growth was not recorded.
