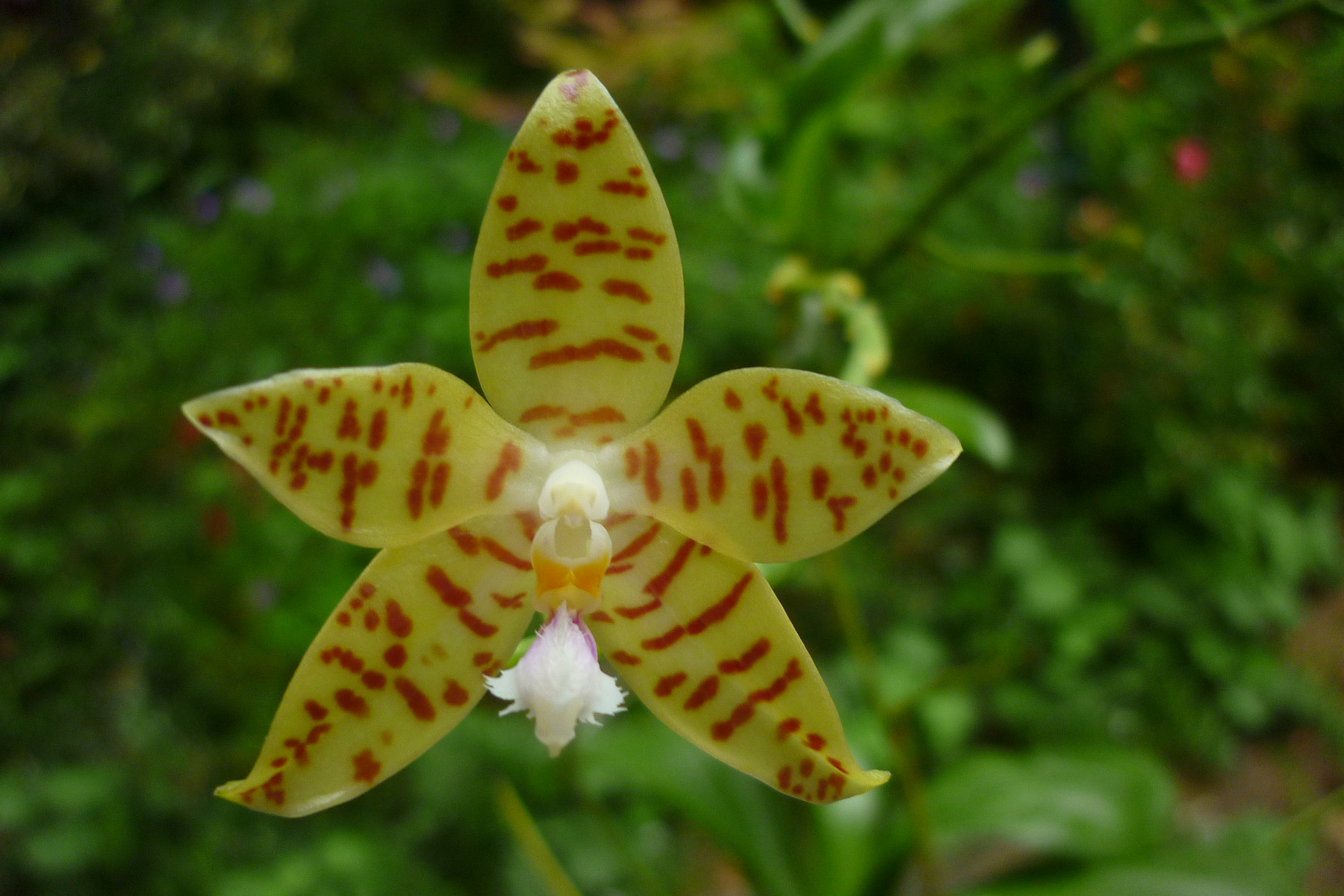
- Flower of Phalaenopsis pallens

Scientific classification
- Kingdom: Plantae
- Clade: Tracheophytes
- Clade: Angiosperms
- Clade: Monocots
- Order: Asparagales
- Family: Orchidaceae
- Subfamily: Epidendroideae
- Genus: Phalaenopsis
- Species: P. pallens

Binomial name
- Phalaenopsis pallens [Lindley]Rchb.f 1864

Synonyms
- Phalaenopsis denticulata Rchb. f. 1887; Phalaenopsis foestermannii Rchb.f 1887; Phalaenopsis lueddemannia var. pallens Burb. 1882; Phalaenopsis mariae var. alba Ames & Quisumb. 1935; Phalaenopsis mariae var alba Burbidge ex Warner; Phalaenopsis pallens f. alba (Ames & Quisumb.) Christenson 2001; Phalaenopsis pallens f. fourmaniana O.Gruss 2001; Phalaenopsis pallens var. alba [Ames & Quis] Sweet 1969; Phalaenopsis pallens var. pallens [Lindley]Rchb.f 1864; Phalaenopsis pallens var. trullifera Sweet 1968; Polychilos pallens (Lindl.) Shim 1982; Stauropsis pallens Rchb. f. 1860; Trichoglottis pallens Lindley 1850

= Phalaenopsis pallens =

Species of orchid

Phalaenopsis pallens is an endemic species of orchid from the Philippines.
