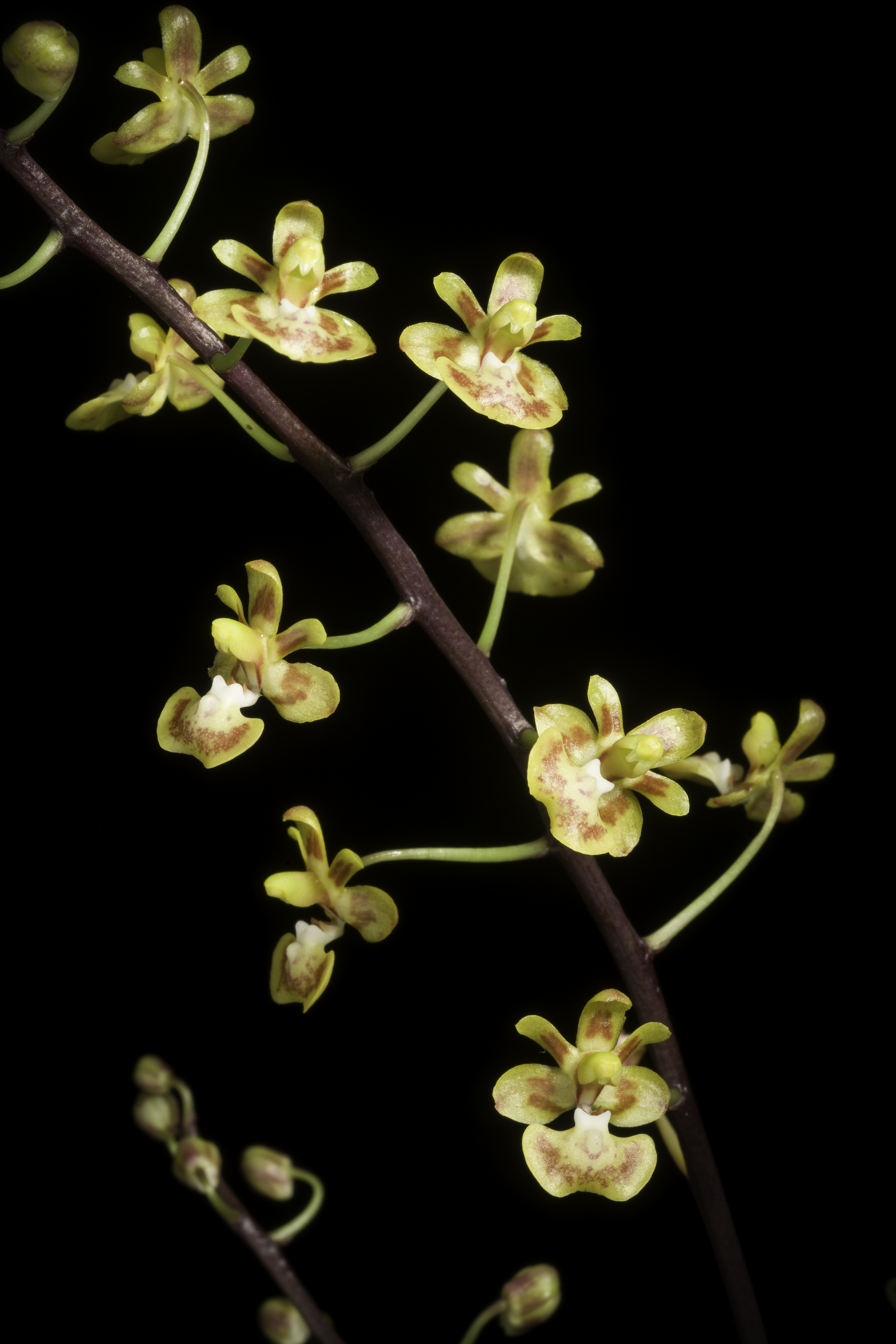
- inflorescence detail

Scientific classification
- Kingdom: Plantae
- Clade: Tracheophytes
- Clade: Angiosperms
- Clade: Monocots
- Order: Asparagales
- Family: Orchidaceae
- Subfamily: Epidendroideae
- Genus: Phalaenopsis
- Species: P. chibae

Binomial name
- Phalaenopsis chibae T.Yukawa
- distribution of Phalaenopsis chibae

Synonyms
- Doritis chibae (T.Yukawa) T.Yukawa & K.Kita; Kingidium chibae (T.Yukawa) O.Gruss & Roellke

= Phalaenopsis chibae =

Species of epiphytic orchid

Phalaenopsis chibae is a species of orchid endemic to Vietnam.

== Description ==
These epiphytes have elliptic to obovate, up to 11 cm long and 4.5 cm wide leaves with purple suffusion. Up to 13 1.2 cm wide, simultaneously opening, pale yellow flowers with brown markings are produced on erect racemes up to 11 cm in length, which show purple colouration. The callus shows purple markings on a white ground colour. The three-lobed lip is densely pubescent behind the callus. It is found in elevations of 400–600 m a.s.l. in Vietnam. The specific epithet chibae refers to the species discoverer Masaaki Chiba of Japan.

== Conservation ==
This species is protected unter the CITES appendix II regulations of international trade.
