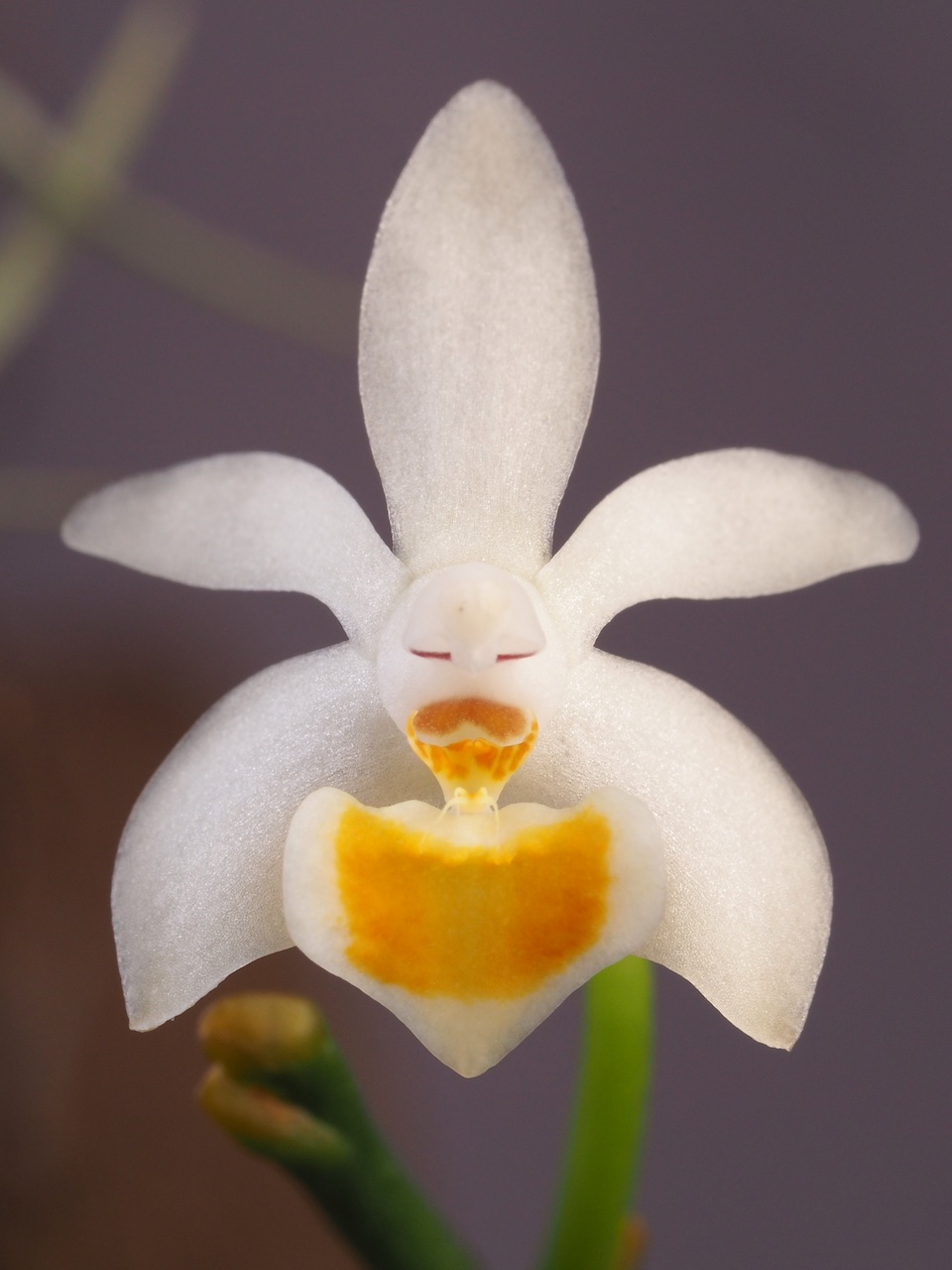
- flower detail

Scientific classification
- Kingdom: Plantae
- Clade: Tracheophytes
- Clade: Angiosperms
- Clade: Monocots
- Order: Asparagales
- Family: Orchidaceae
- Subfamily: Epidendroideae
- Genus: Phalaenopsis
- Species: P. malipoensis

Binomial name
- Phalaenopsis malipoensis Z.J.Liu & S.C.Chen
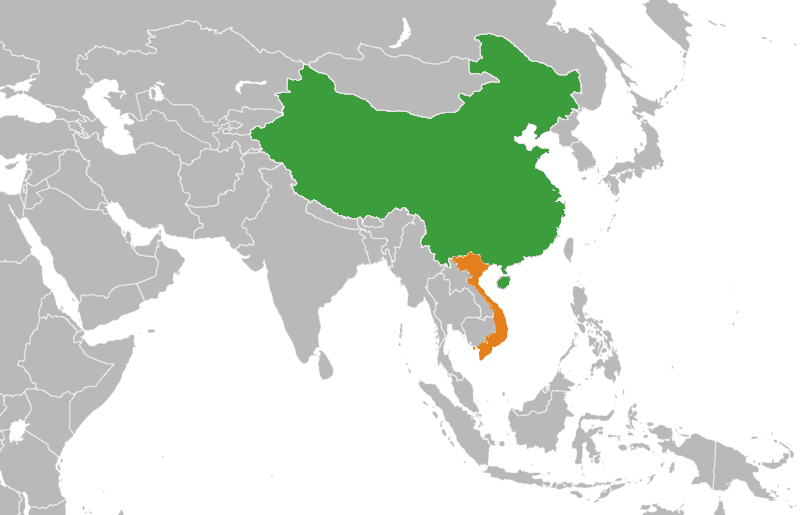
- distribution of Phalaenopsis malipoensis

Synonyms
- Phalaenopsis malipoensis f. aurea O.Gruss

= Phalaenopsis malipoensis =

Species of epiphytic orchid

Phalaenopsis malipoensis, also known as 麻栗坡蝴蝶兰 (ma li po hu die lan) in Chinese, is a species of orchid native to South-Central China and Vietnam. The specific epithet malipoensis refers to the Chinese locality Malipo, which is a hotspot for biodiversity research in Yunnan Province, China.

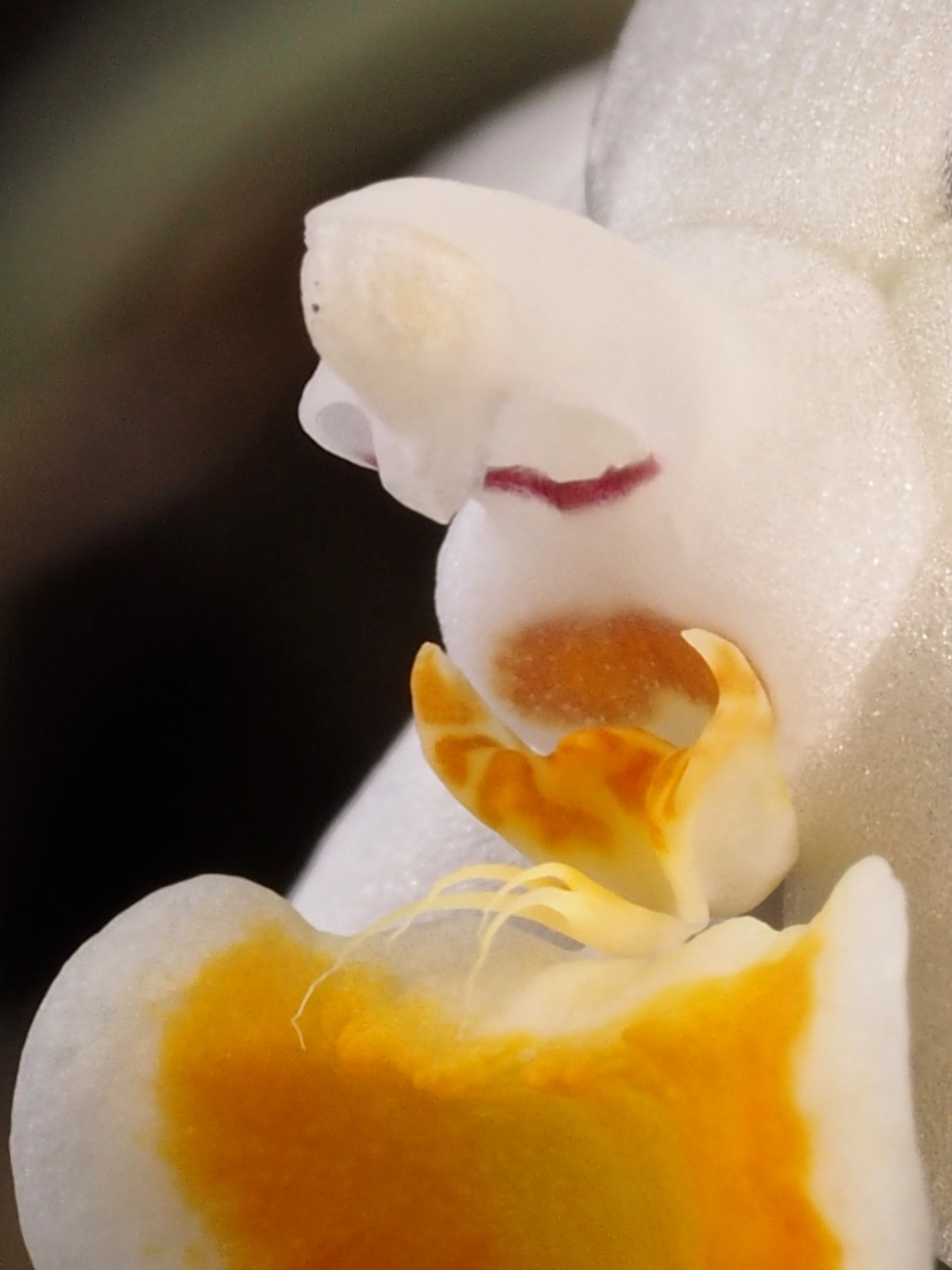
Detail of column and labellum with four filiform-linear antennae

== Description ==
These plants have short stems enclosed in leaf sheaths, which produce flattened, up to 50 cm long adventitious roots. The stem bears 3-5 oblong-elliptic, deciduous, 4.5-7 cm long and 3-3.6 cm wide leaves. Sometimes 1-2 leaves persist throughout the winter. Throughout April to May white, 1.2-1.6 cm wide flowers with a yellow labellum are produced on 3-4 axillary racemes, which produce 3-4 flowers each. The callus on the labellum produces four 3 mm long filiform-linear antennae.

== Ecology ==
In China this plant occurs on trees in sparse forests and forest margins at elevations of 600-1300 m. In Vietnam it has been described to grow in submontane evergreen broad-leaved humid forests on karstic limestone at elevations of 1000–1100 m above sea level. In Vietnam it grows under comparable ecological conditions.

== Taxonomy ==
It is closely related to Phalaenopsis gibbosa and the precise relationship between both species is unclear. The ornamentation of the labellum is very similar. However, this species can be differentiated from Phalaenopsis gibbosa through its slender, straight rachis and through its narrow petals. Phalaenopsis gibbosa has broader petals and a firm, stout rachis, which is "zigzag"-shaped.

== Conservation ==
This species is rare. Its estimated IUCN Red List status is data deficient (DD). International trade is regulated through the CITES appendix II regulations of international trade.
