= Phalaenopsis zhejiangensis =

Scientific classification
- Kingdom: Plantae
- Clade: Tracheophytes
- Clade: Angiosperms
- Clade: Monocots
- Order: Asparagales
- Family: Orchidaceae
- Subfamily: Epidendroideae
- Genus: Phalaenopsis
- Species: P. zhejiangensis

Binomial name
- Phalaenopsis zhejiangensis (Z.H.Tsi) Schuit.
- Distribution of Phalaenopsis zhejiangensis

Synonyms
- Doritis zhejiangensis (Z.H.Tsi) T.Yukawa & K.Kita; Nothodoritis zhejiangensis Z.H.Tsi

Species of epiphytic orchid

Phalaenopsis zhejiangensis, also known as 象鼻兰 (xiàng bí lán) in Chinese, is a species of orchid native to Thailand and Vietnam. It is firmly established to be within the genus Phalaenopsis. Its extraordinary flowers are white with purple transverse bands on sepals and petals and with purple lip markings. It is a typical epiphytic orchid. It is found at elevations of 300 to 900 m. The specific epithet zhejiangensis refers to this species origin in the Chinese province of Zhejiang. It is closely related to Phalaenopsis wilsonii.

== Conservation ==
The IUCN has not assessed this species' conservation status. It is however protected under the CITES appendix II regulations of international trade. It is a rare and endangered plant with extremely small populations. It is threatened with extinction as a result of habitat loss. Artificial means of propagation were investigated as measures of conservation, and an efficient protocol for large-scale propagation was established.
