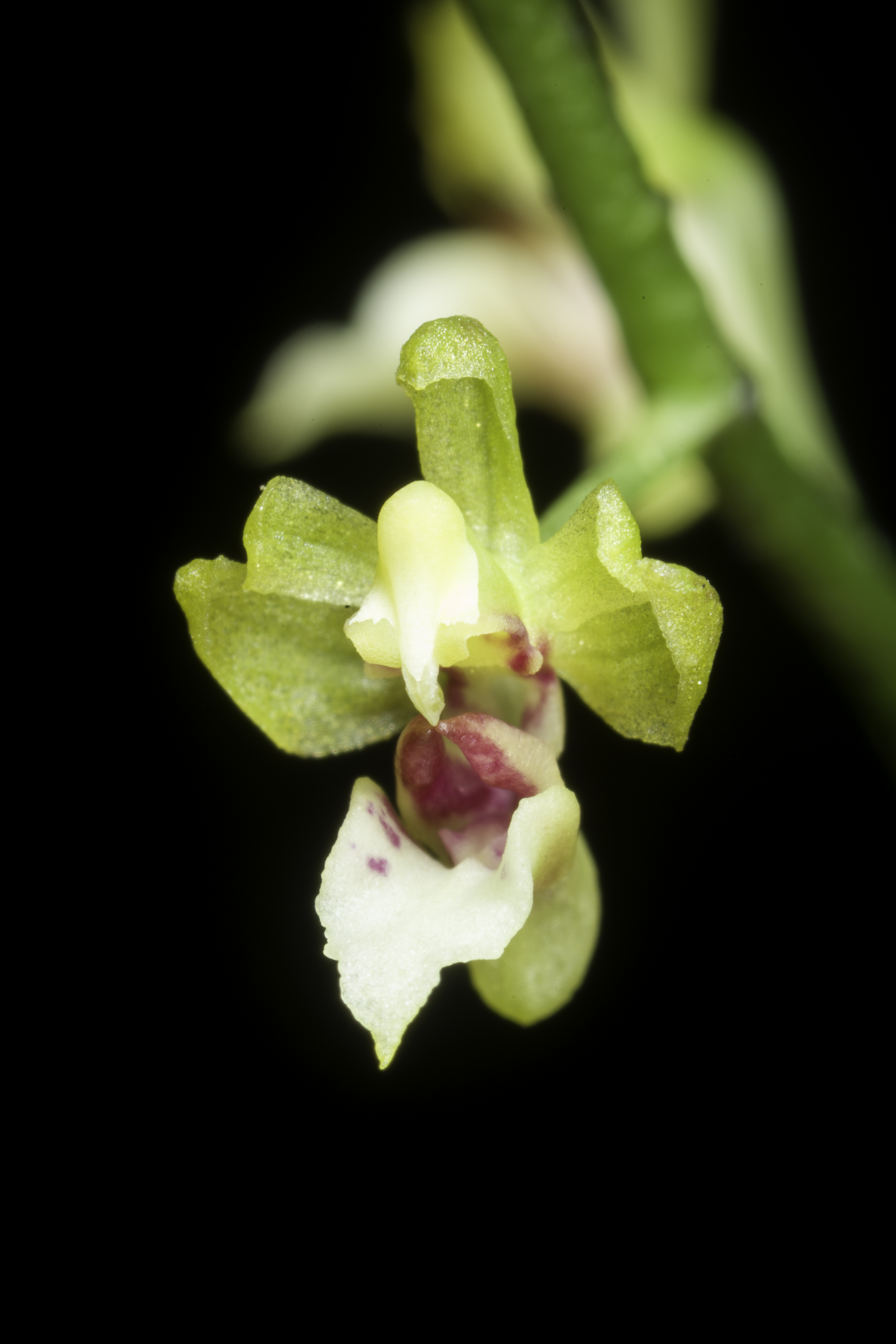
- flower detail

Scientific classification
- Kingdom: Plantae
- Clade: Tracheophytes
- Clade: Angiosperms
- Clade: Monocots
- Order: Asparagales
- Family: Orchidaceae
- Subfamily: Epidendroideae
- Genus: Phalaenopsis
- Species: P. mirabilis

Binomial name
- Phalaenopsis mirabilis (Seidenf.) Schuit.
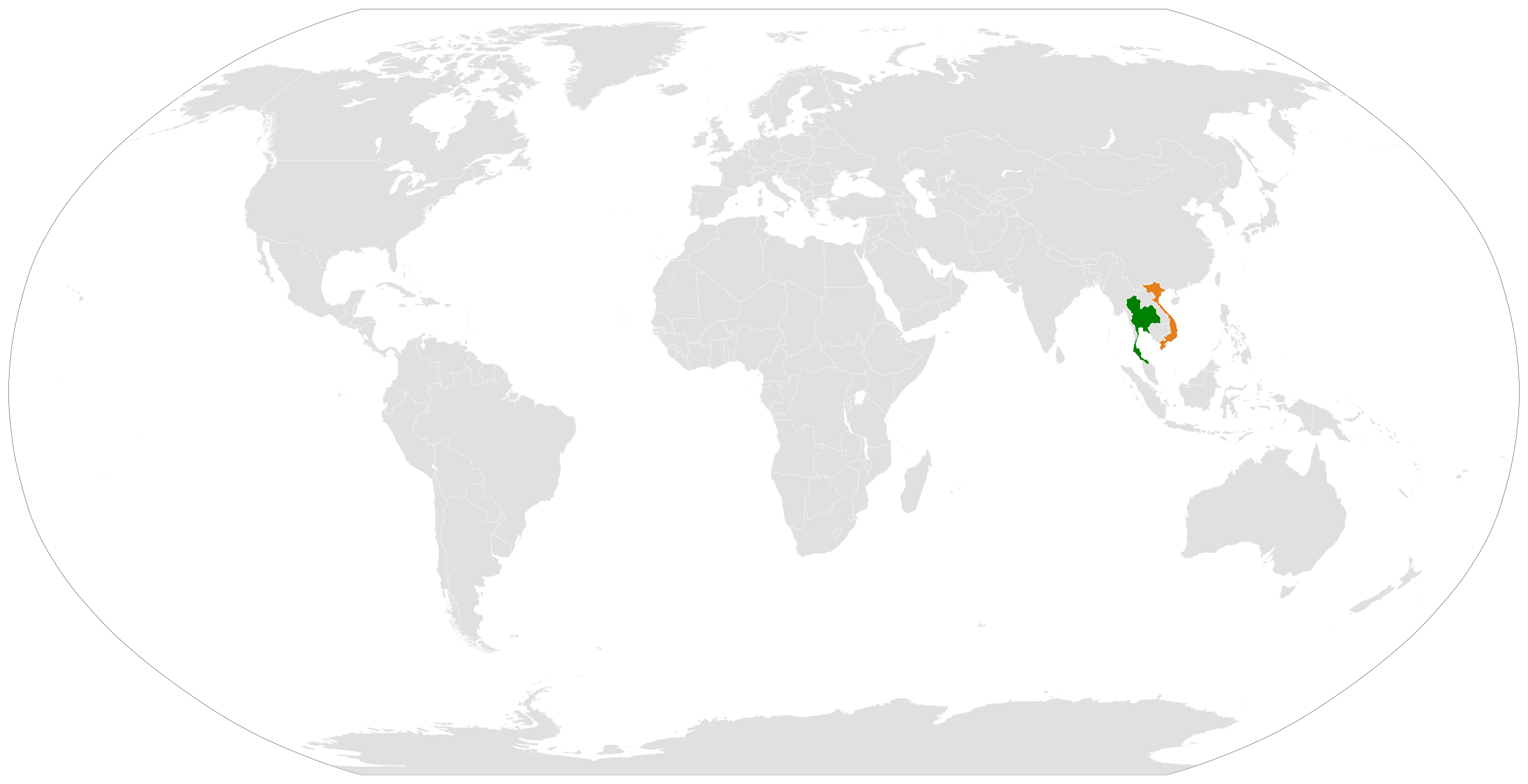
- distribution of Phalaenopsis mirabilis

Synonyms
- Doritis mirabilis (Seidenf.) T.Yukawa & K.Kita; Lesliea mirabilis Seidenf.

= Phalaenopsis mirabilis =

Species of epiphytic orchid

Phalaenopsis mirabilis is a species of orchid native to Vietnam and Thailand. The specific epithet mirabilis means wonderful, marvelous, or extraordinary.

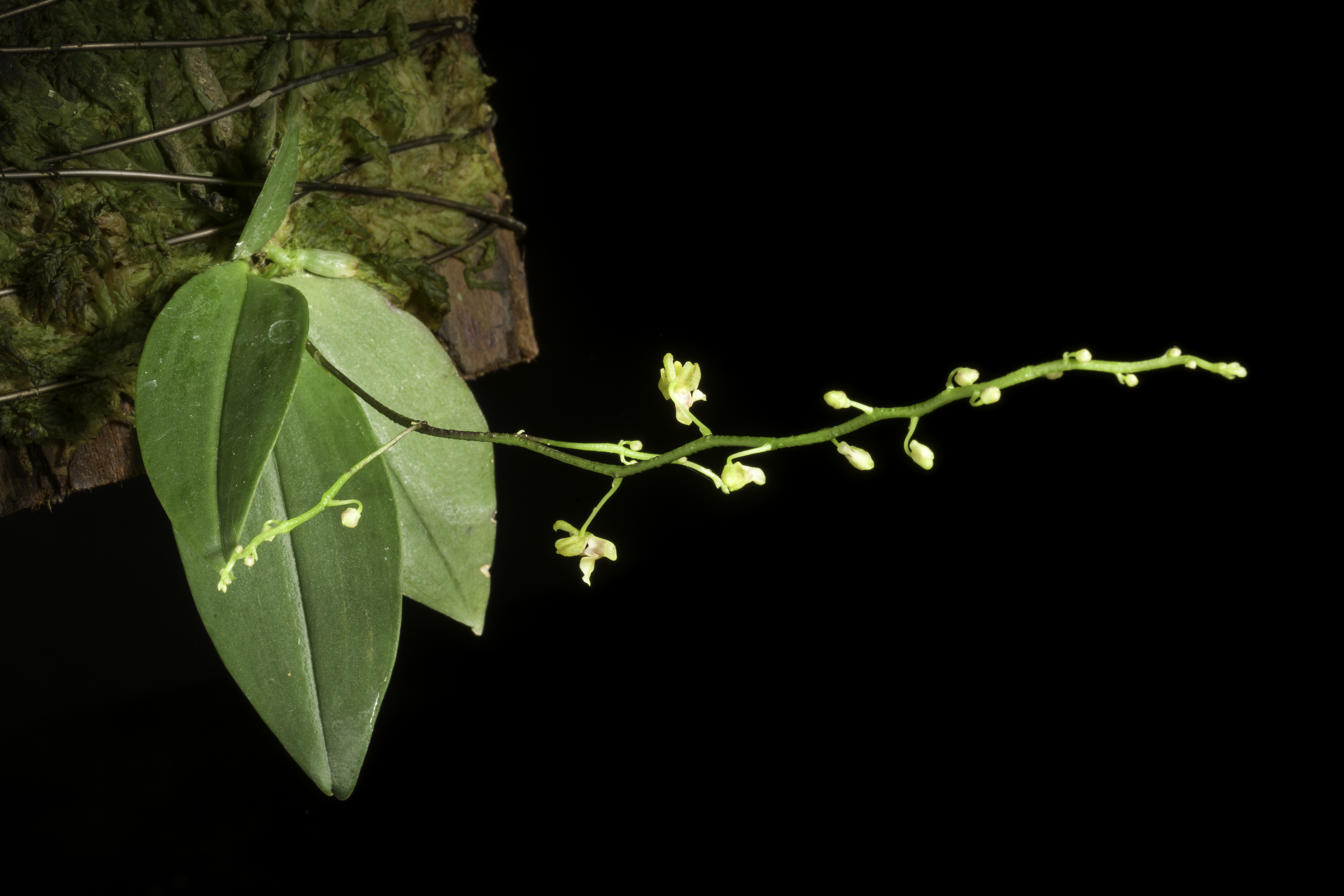
Entire plant with inflorescence

== Description ==
This species is a miniature, warm to cool-growing branch and canopy epiphyte. It has a short stem, which is enclosed in leaf sheaths. The leaves are oval-elliptic and unequally bilobed at the apex. 0.7 cm wide flowers arise from pendent to erect, 8-10 cm long, few to several flowered inflorescences. Flowering occurs from September to October.

== Ecology ==
This species occurs in primary and old secondary, dry, evergreen, broad-leaved, lowland and montane forests at elevations of 680-1300 m above sea level. It is commonly present along stream valleys.

== Taxonomy ==
Within the subgenus Parishianae it is placed in the same clade as species of section Aphyllae. It appears to be closely related to Phalaenopsis pulcherrima. Two other analyses suggest a close relationship to Phalaenopsis deliciosa.

== Conservation ==
It is very rare and has only been recorded in few locations. Its estimated IUCN conservation status is data deficient (DD). International trade is regulated through the CITES appendix II regulations of international trade.
