= Phalaenopsis boulbetii =

Scientific classification
- Kingdom: Plantae
- Clade: Tracheophytes
- Clade: Angiosperms
- Clade: Monocots
- Order: Asparagales
- Family: Orchidaceae
- Subfamily: Epidendroideae
- Genus: Phalaenopsis
- Species: P. boulbetii

Binomial name
- Phalaenopsis boulbetii (Telepova) J.M.H.Shaw.
- distribution of Phalaenopsis boulbetii

Synonyms
- Doritis boulbetii Telepova

Species of epiphytic orchid

Phalaenopsis boulbetii is a species of orchid endemic to Cambodia. This species grows lithophytically. The specific epithet boulbetii honours the French cartographer fr:Jean Boulbet.

== Conservation ==
This species is protected unter the CITES appendix II regulations of international trade.
