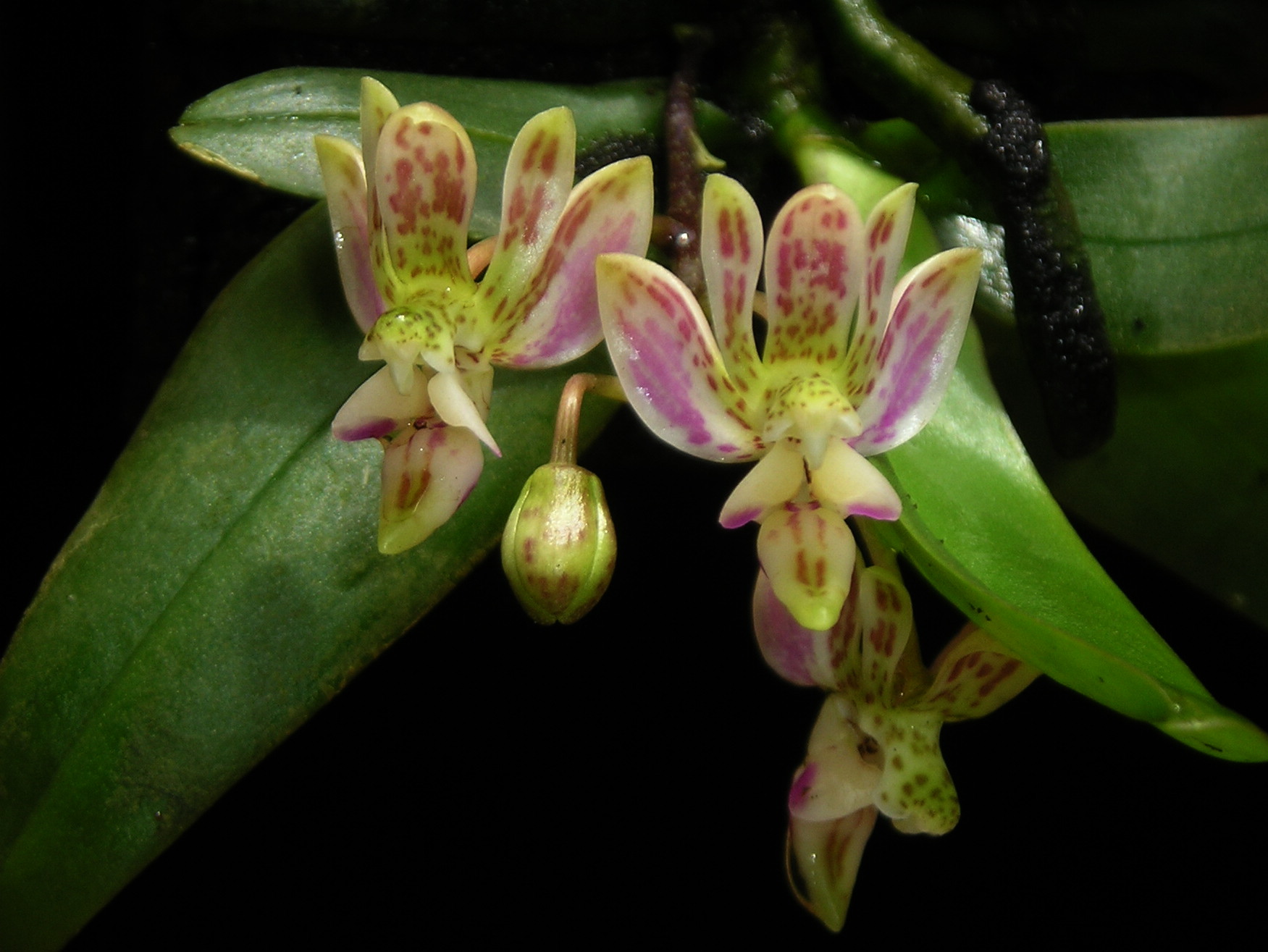

Scientific classification
- Kingdom: Plantae
- Clade: Tracheophytes
- Clade: Angiosperms
- Clade: Monocots
- Order: Asparagales
- Family: Orchidaceae
- Subfamily: Epidendroideae
- Genus: Phalaenopsis
- Species: P. finleyi

Binomial name
- Phalaenopsis finleyi Christenson

Synonyms
- Doritis minus (Seidenf.) T.Yukawa & K.Kita; Kingidium minus Seidenf.; Phalaenopsis minor (Seidenf.) Christenson; Phalaenopsis minus (Seidenf.) Christenson

= Phalaenopsis finleyi =

Species of epiphytic orchid

Phalaenopsis finleyi is a species of orchid native to Myanmar, Thailand and Vietnam .

== Description ==
This species of epiphyte has short stems, bearing elliptic leaves up to 9 cm in width. Flowers are produced on arching to pendent racemes. The white petals and sepals with brown longitudinal barring are reflexed. Purple spotting occurs on the lateral sepals and on the labellum. The labellum is broadly rounded at its apex and bears a biseriate callus. The column has broadly rounded, lateral wings at the stigma.

== Taxonomy ==
Seidenfaden compared this species relatively early on to Phalaenopsis stobartiana, a species of Phalaenopsis section Aphyllae. This affinity was later confirmed to be correct.
The chromosome count is 2n = 2x = 34. It is reduced, just like in species of Phalaenopsis section Aphyllae. The karyotype is symmetrical and uniform in size. It is clear, that Phalaenopsis finleyi is closely related to Phalaenopsis section Aphyllae. Together they form a monophyletic clade. A synapomorphy is the reduction of the chromosome count. This view is supported by Christenson, who suggested this placement based on morphology.

== Ecology ==
This species grows on trunks and branches of broad-leaved evergreen forests. It grows in canopies of large trees and is difficult to observe. Hence, the information on its distribution remains unclear. Flowering occurs throughout June–July.

== Conservation ==
This species is very rare. It is categorized as endangered (EN). And it is potentially threatened by regional trade. International trade is regulated through the CITES appendix II regulations of international trade.
