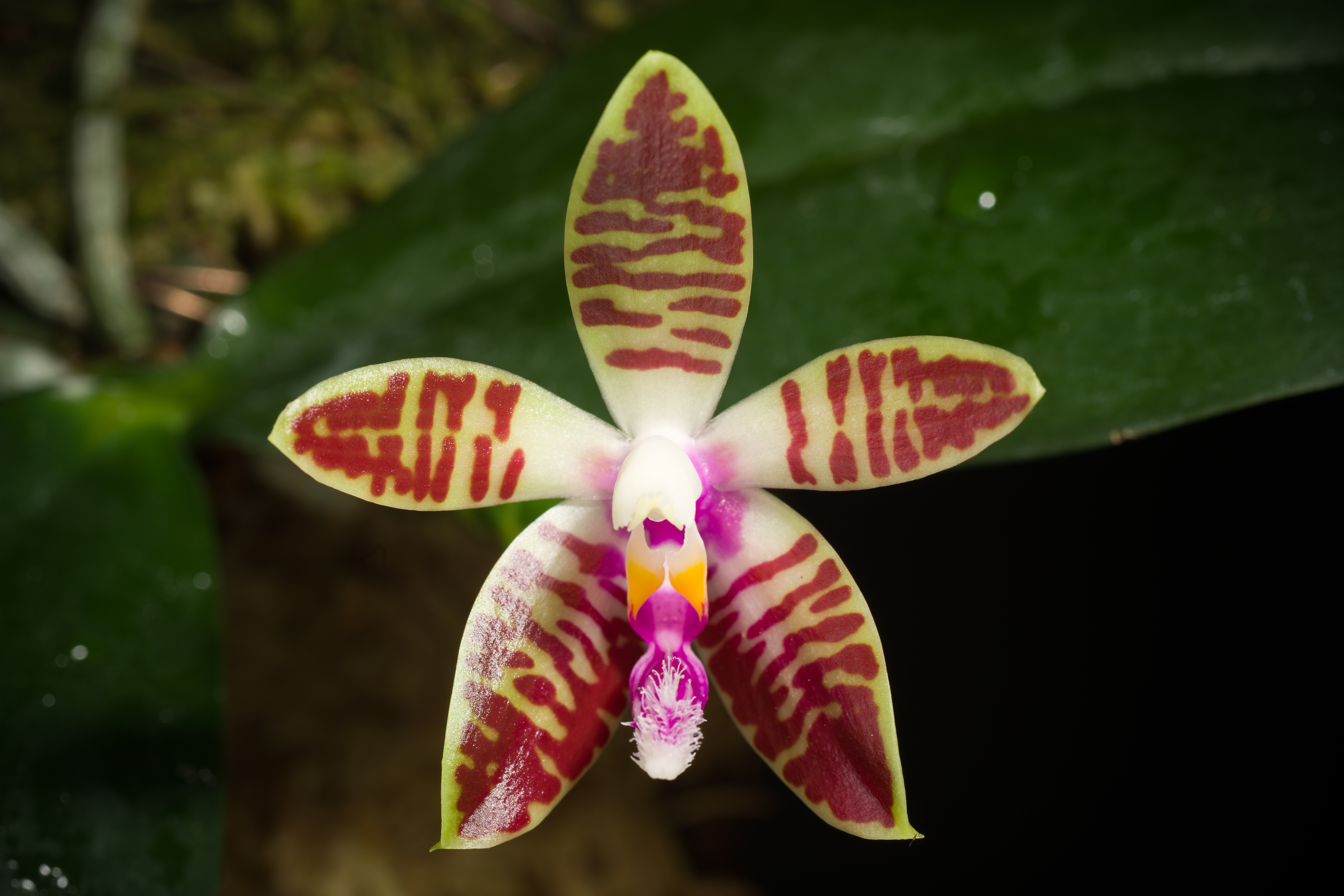
- Flower detail

Scientific classification
- Kingdom: Plantae
- Clade: Tracheophytes
- Clade: Angiosperms
- Clade: Monocots
- Order: Asparagales
- Family: Orchidaceae
- Subfamily: Epidendroideae
- Genus: Phalaenopsis
- Species: P. corningiana

Binomial name
- Phalaenopsis corningiana Rchb.f.
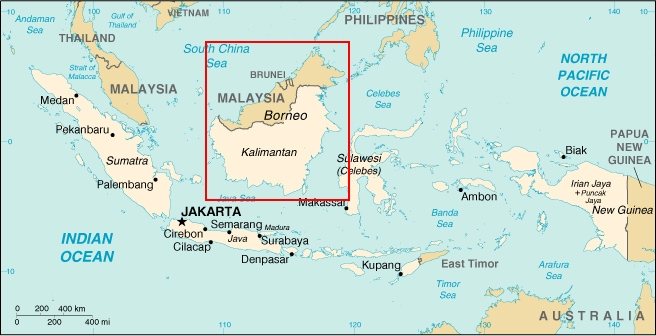
- distribution of Phalaenopsis corningiana

Synonyms
- Phalaenopsis corningiana Rchb.f.; Polychilos corningiana (Rchb.f.) Shim; Phalaenopsis sumatrana var. sanguinea Rchb.f.; Phalaenopsis sumatrana subvar. sanguinea (Rchb.f.) Veitch, Man

= Phalaenopsis corningiana =

Species of epiphytic orchid

Phalaenopsis corningiana is a species of orchid endemic to the island of Borneo.

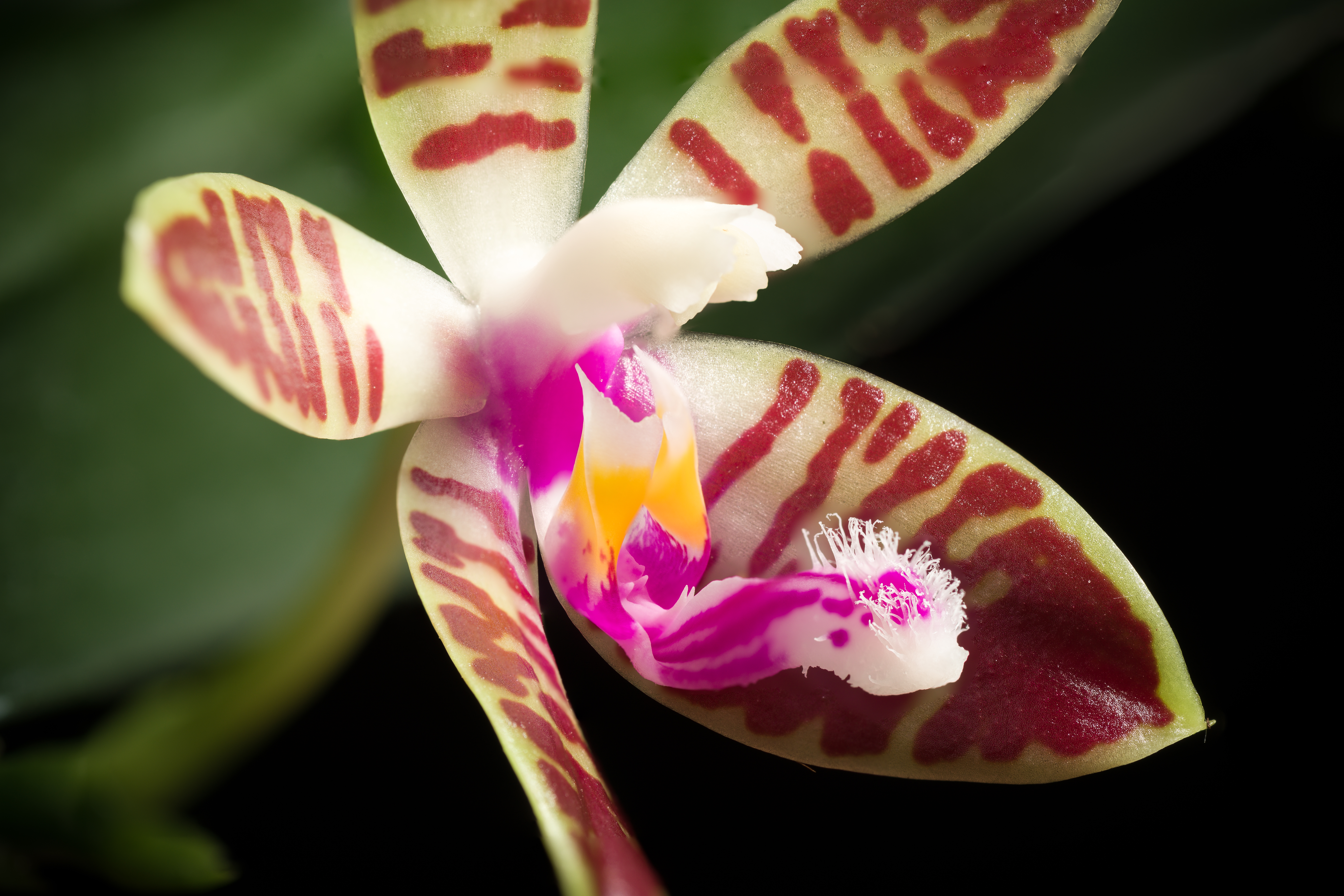
labellum densely covered in multicellular trichomes

== Description ==
These epiphytic herbs have elliptic-obovate, rounded or acute leaves up to 32 cm in length and 11 cm in width. Strongly fragrant, cream coloured flowers with overlaying brown patterns are produced on arching to subpendent racemes or panicles, which may reach lengths of 30 cm. The midlobe of the labellum is densely covered in multicellular trichomes at the apex. The pedicel and ovary is up to 4 cm long. The specific epithet corningiana honours the early orchid grower Erastus Corning Jr..

== Confusion with Phalaenopsis sumatrana and Phalaenopsis zebrina ==
The darker forms of Phalaenopsis sumatrana are commonly confused with Phalaenopsis corningiana. In cultivation this is fortified through the rare occurrence of true Phalaenopsis corningiana specimens. Both species differ in regard to their callus morphology, floral colouration and fragrance. This species is part of the Phalaenopsis sumatrana complex, comprising P. sumatrana, P. corningiana and the questionable P. zebrina, which is treated as synonym of P. corningiana. These species occur sympatric (i.e. in the same area) and can form natural hybrids. While there is currently a consensus, that P. sumatrana and P. corningiana are separate entities based on morphology, this is not supported on a genetic level. The genetic evidence however seems to support a separate species status of P. zebrina. In addition it can be differentiated through its fragrance.

== Conservation ==
This species is protected unter the CITES appendix II regulations of international trade.
