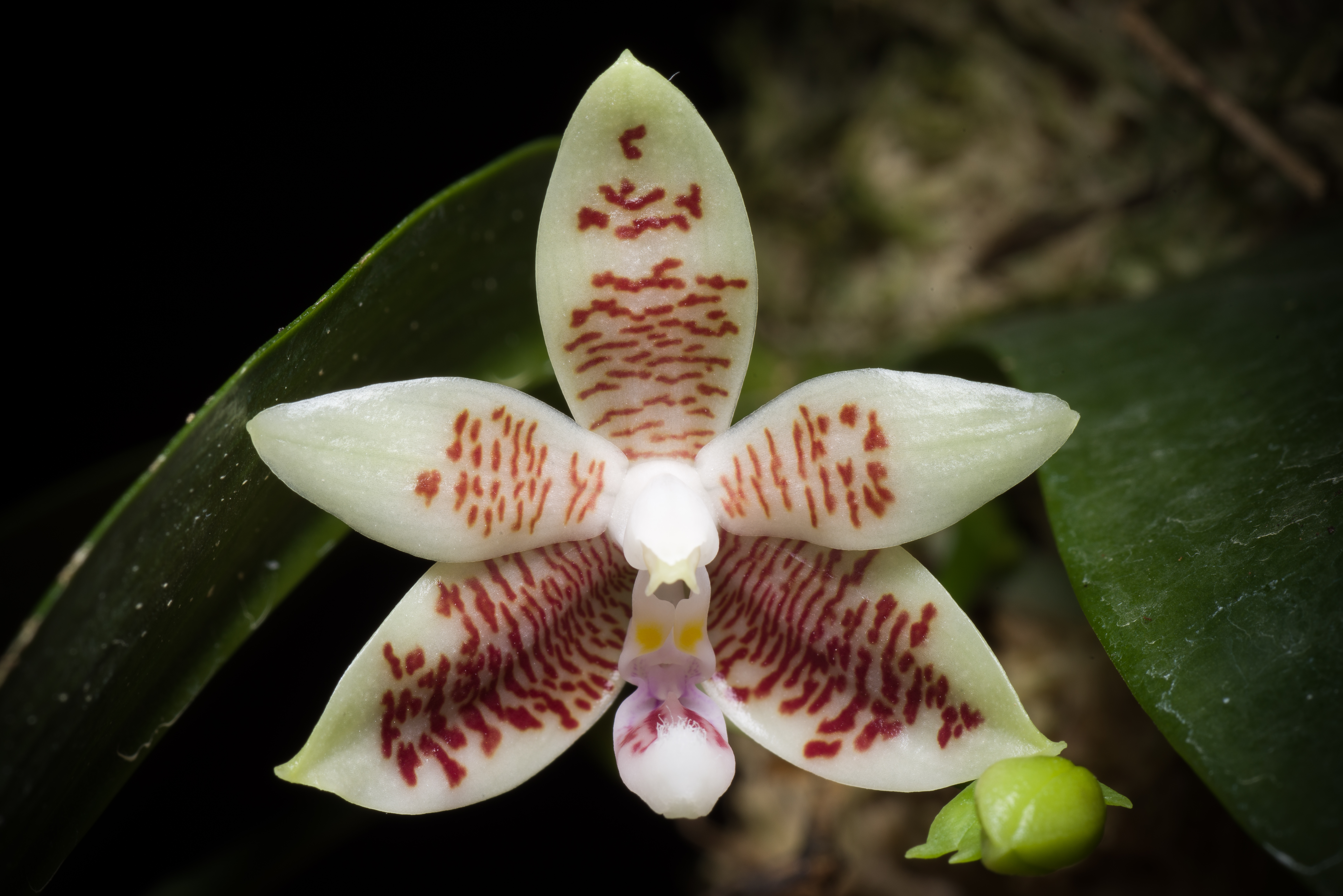
- Flower detail

Scientific classification
- Kingdom: Plantae
- Clade: Tracheophytes
- Clade: Angiosperms
- Clade: Monocots
- Order: Asparagales
- Family: Orchidaceae
- Subfamily: Epidendroideae
- Genus: Phalaenopsis
- Species: P. inscriptiosinensis

Binomial name
- Phalaenopsis inscriptiosinensis H.R.Sweet
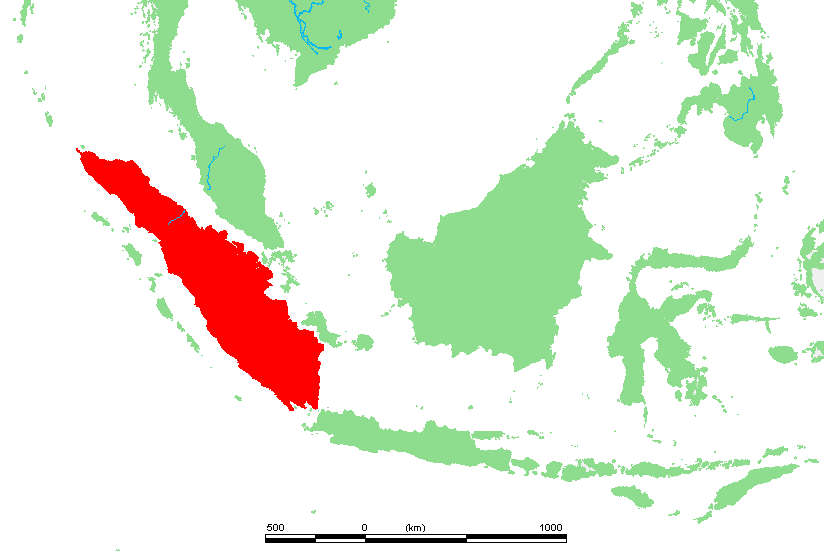
- distribution of "Phalaenopsis inscriptiosinensis"

Synonyms
- Phalaenopsis sinensis Hort.

= Phalaenopsis inscriptiosinensis =

Species of epiphytic orchid

Phalaenopsis inscriptiosinensis is a species of orchid endemic to central Sumatra.

== Description ==
The plants are short-stemmed epiphytes with 3-5, elliptic-oblong, 8-16 cm long and 4-8 cm wide leaves. The 3.5 cm wide, white or pale yellow flowers bear transverse band of brown, which are reflected in the specific epithet inscriptiosinensis, as they are thought to resemble inscription on the petals and sepals. They are produced on axillary, decurved, 2-5 flowered racemes.

== Taxonomy ==
This species is placed within the section Zebrinae, however its position is somewhat unclear. It could be separated from other species of this section on the basis of restriction site polymorphisms.

== Conservation ==
This species is protected unter the CITES appendix II regulations of international trade.

== Images ==
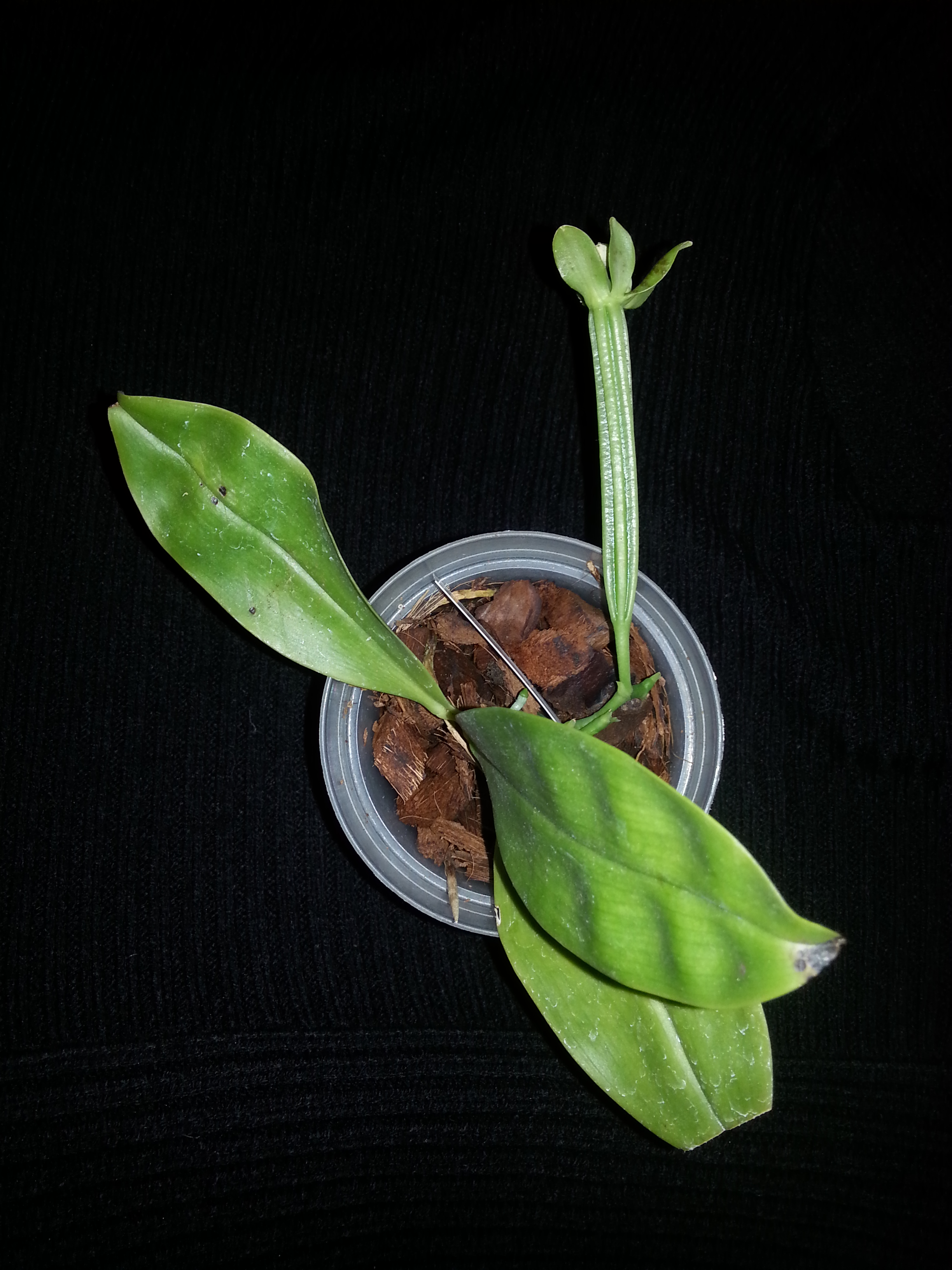
capsule

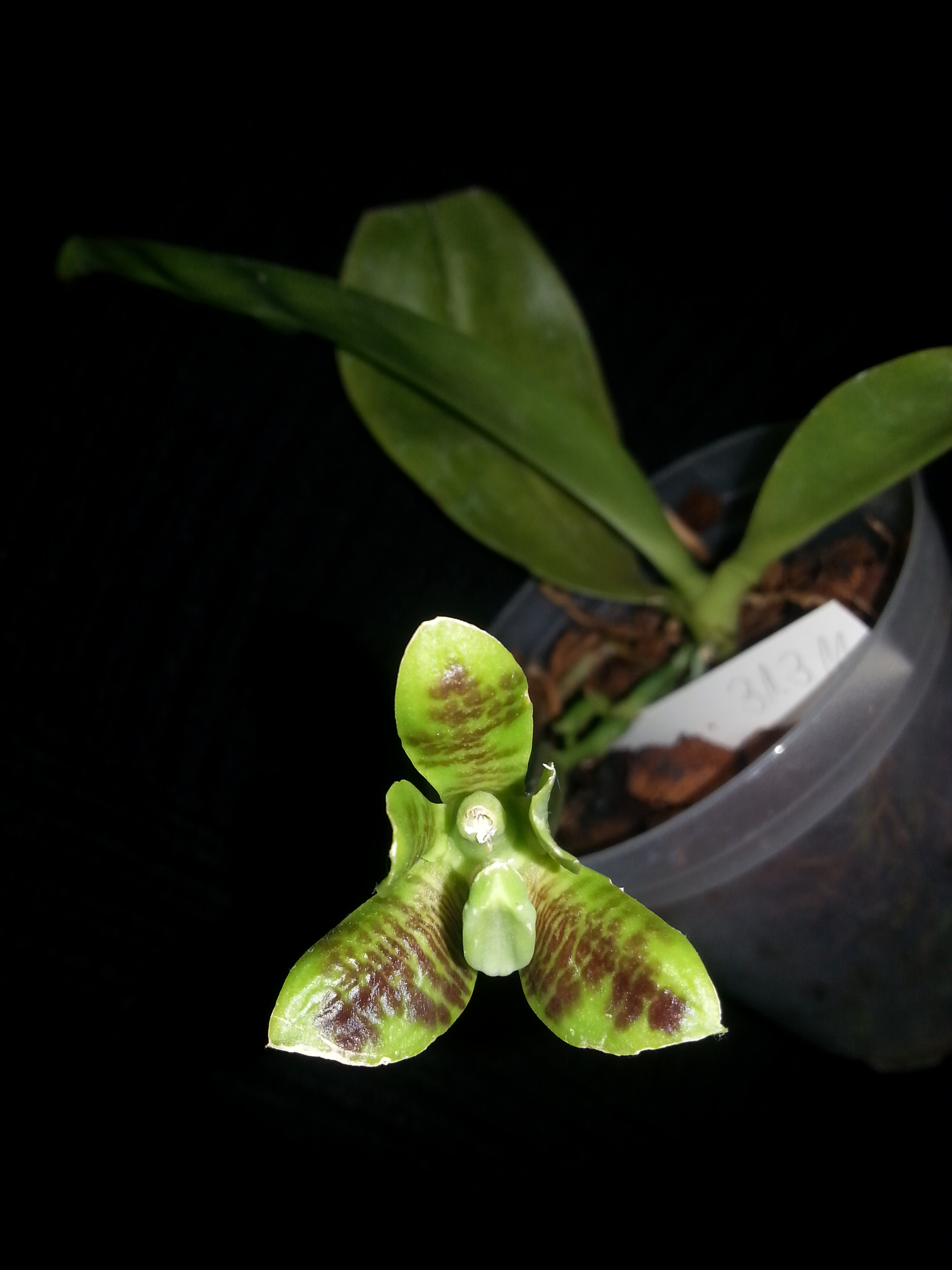
petals and sepals become photosynthetic after fertilisation

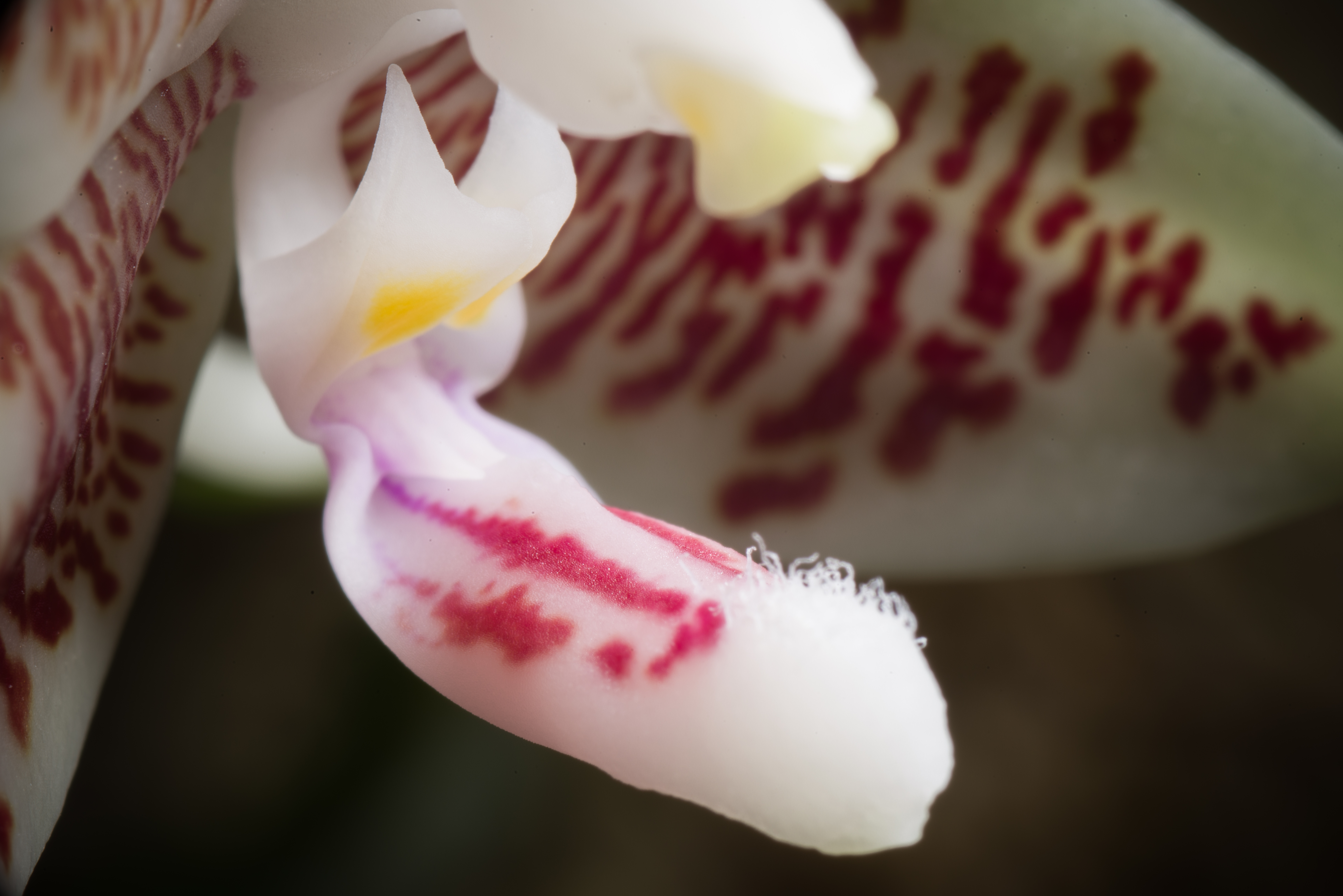
labellum detail with dense trichomes at the apex
