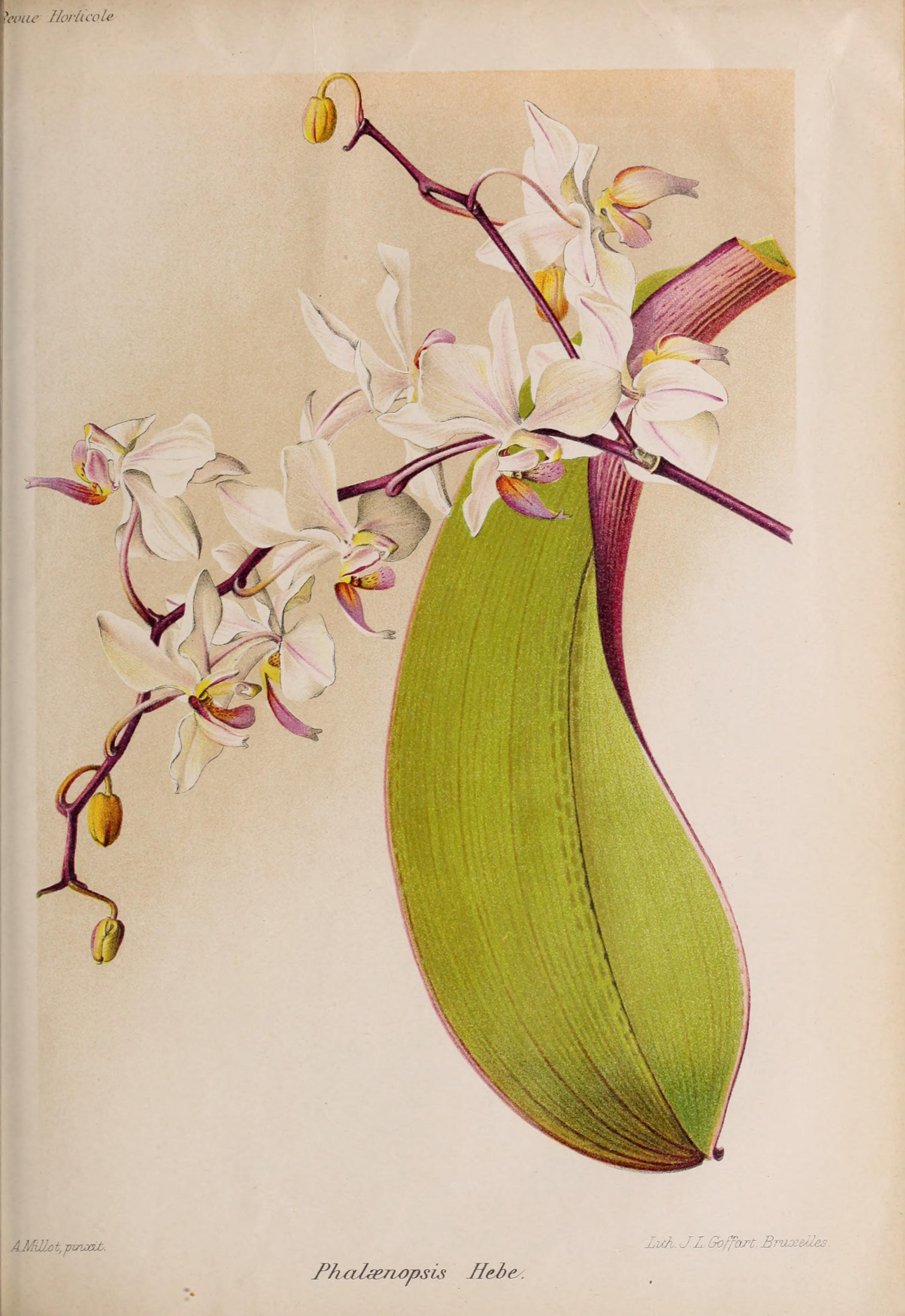
- Phahaelopsis × rolfeana as Phalaenopsis hebe

Scientific classification
- Kingdom: Plantae
- Clade: Tracheophytes
- Clade: Angiosperms
- Clade: Monocots
- Order: Asparagales
- Family: Orchidaceae
- Subfamily: Epidendroideae
- Genus: Phalaenopsis
- Species: P. × rolfeana

Binomial name
- Phalaenopsis × rolfeana H.R.Sweet
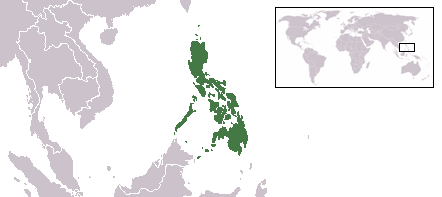
- Distribution of Phalaenopsis × rolfeana

Synonyms
- Phalaenopsis × hebe Rolfe, nom. illeg.

= Phalaenopsis × rolfeana =

Species of orchid

Phalaenopsis × rolfeana is a species of orchid native to the Philippines. It is a hybrid of Phalaenopsis equestris and Phalaenopsis sanderiana.

== Etymology ==
The specific epithet rolfeana honours the English botanist Robert Allen Rolfe, who specialised in the study of orchids. He had first described this taxon as Phalaenopsis × hebe, which however was a Nomen illegitimum and thus not accepted.
