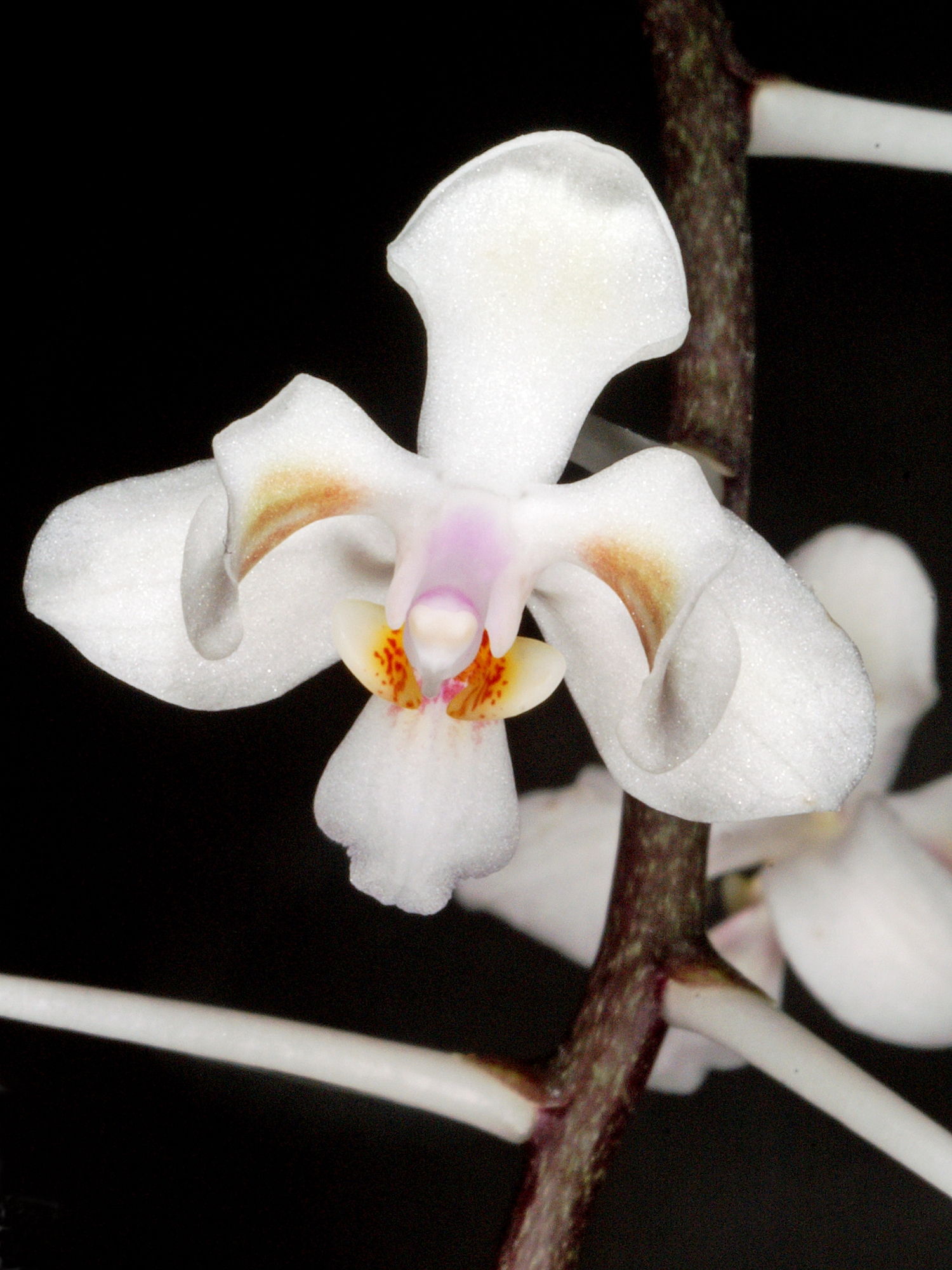
- flower detail

Scientific classification
- Kingdom: Plantae
- Clade: Tracheophytes
- Clade: Angiosperms
- Clade: Monocots
- Order: Asparagales
- Family: Orchidaceae
- Subfamily: Epidendroideae
- Genus: Phalaenopsis
- Species: P. celebensis

Binomial name
- Phalaenopsis celebensis H.R.Sweet
- distribution of Phalaenopsis celebensis

= Phalaenopsis celebensis =

Species of epiphytic orchid

Phalaenopsis celebensis is a species of miniature epiphytic orchid endemic to the island Sulawesi of Indonesia. The specific epithet celebensis refers to another name of the island Celebes and indicates this species origin on this island.

== Description ==
The 17 cm long and 6 cm wide, oblong-obovate leaves with a dark green ground colour are speckled with silverly dots, which are arranged in horizontal stripes. The inflorescences are densely flowered racemes, bearing white flowers with central brown suffusions on the petals. This colouration is not present on the sepals, but the base of the labellum also bears brown stripes. The dorsal sepal is revolute, i.e. it bends backwards. The lateral sepals bend inwards.

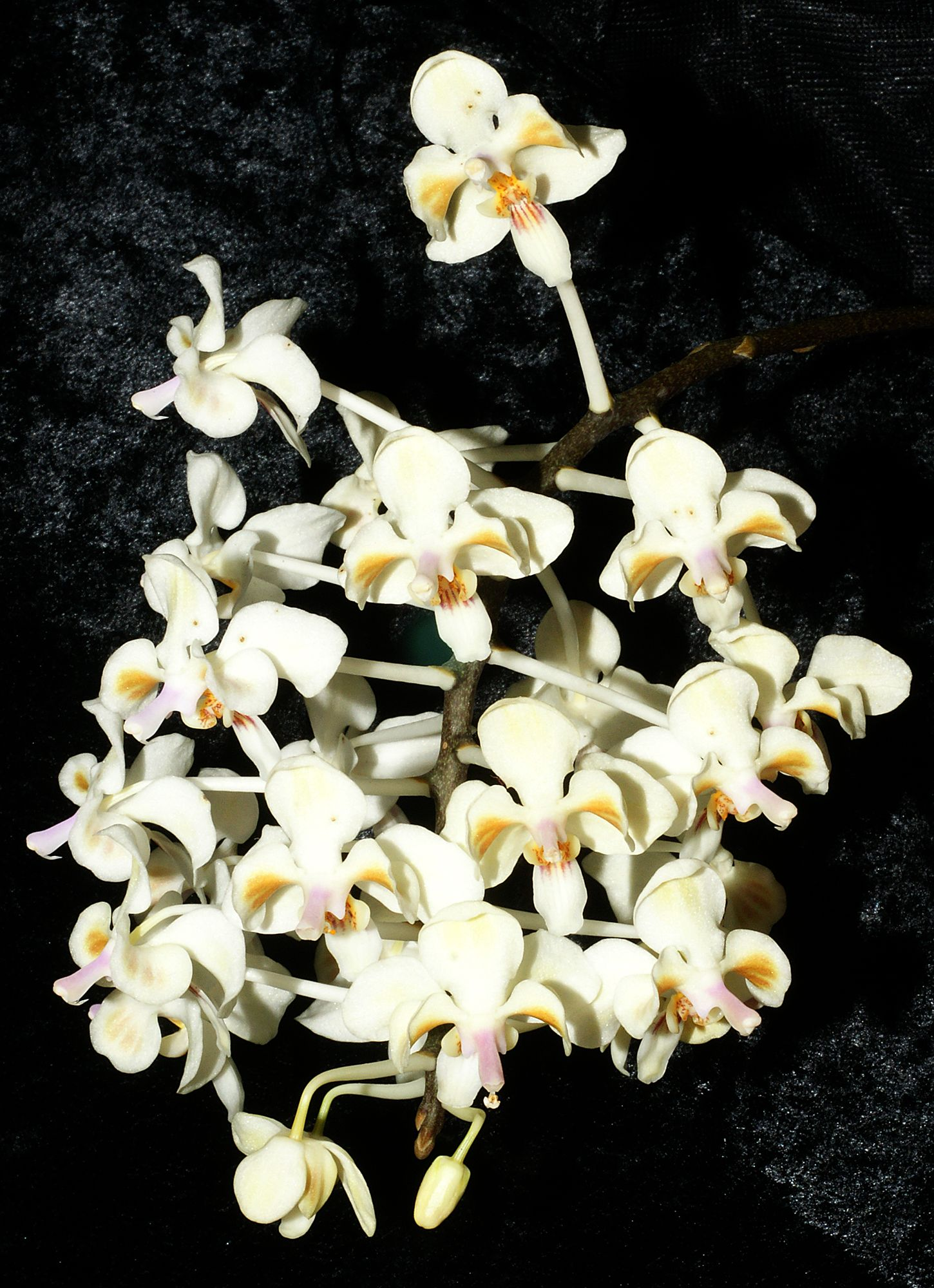

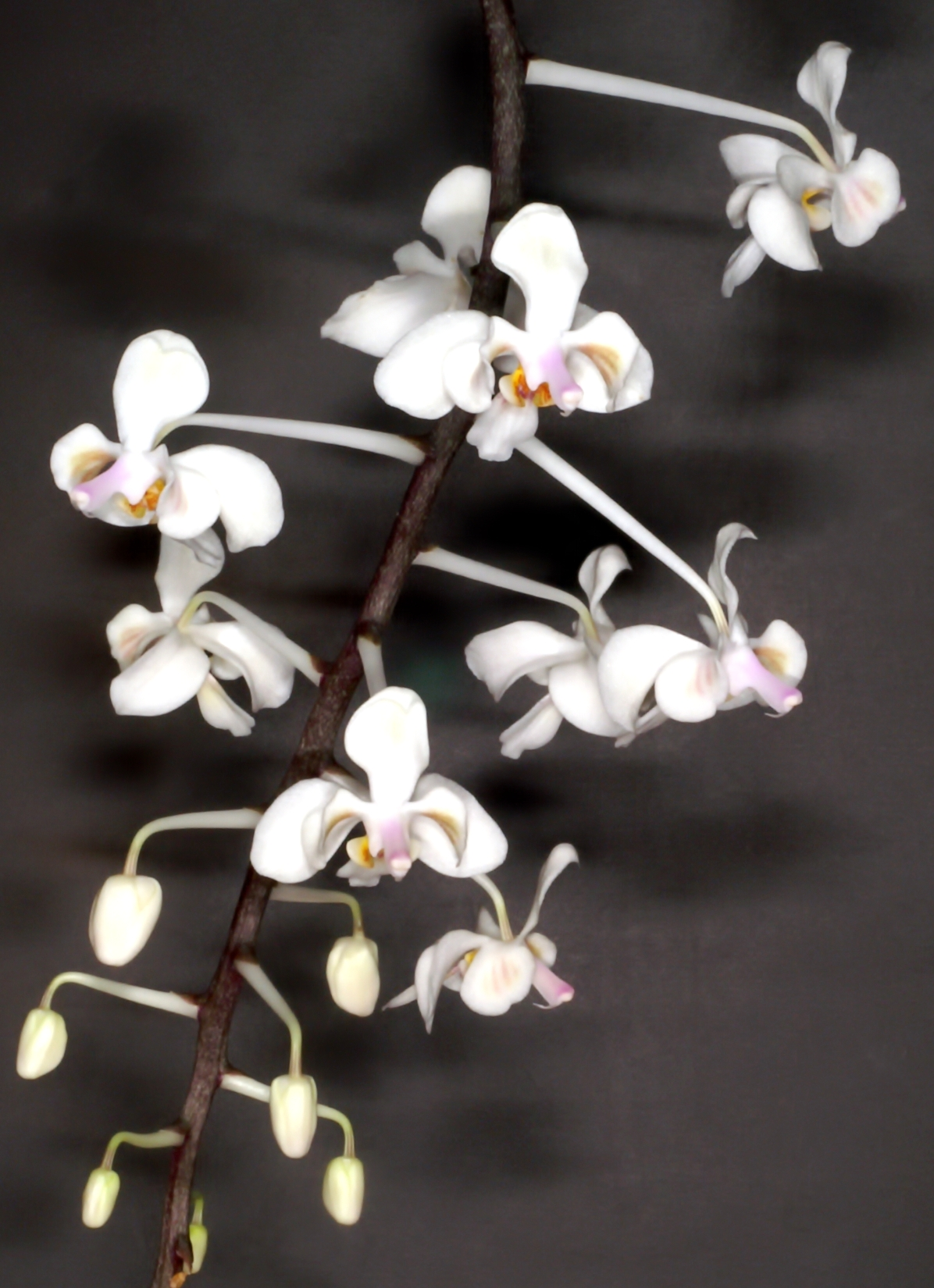

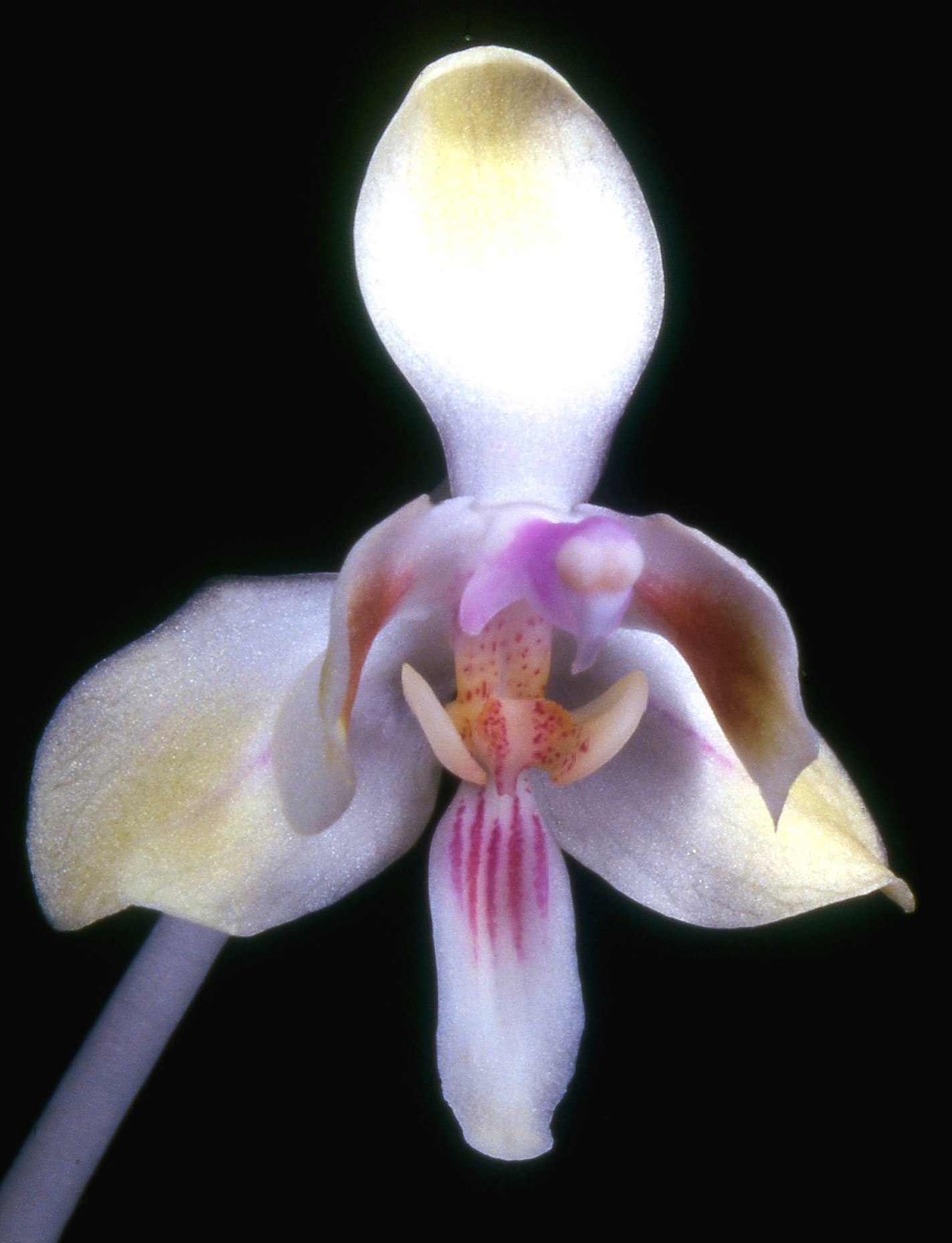

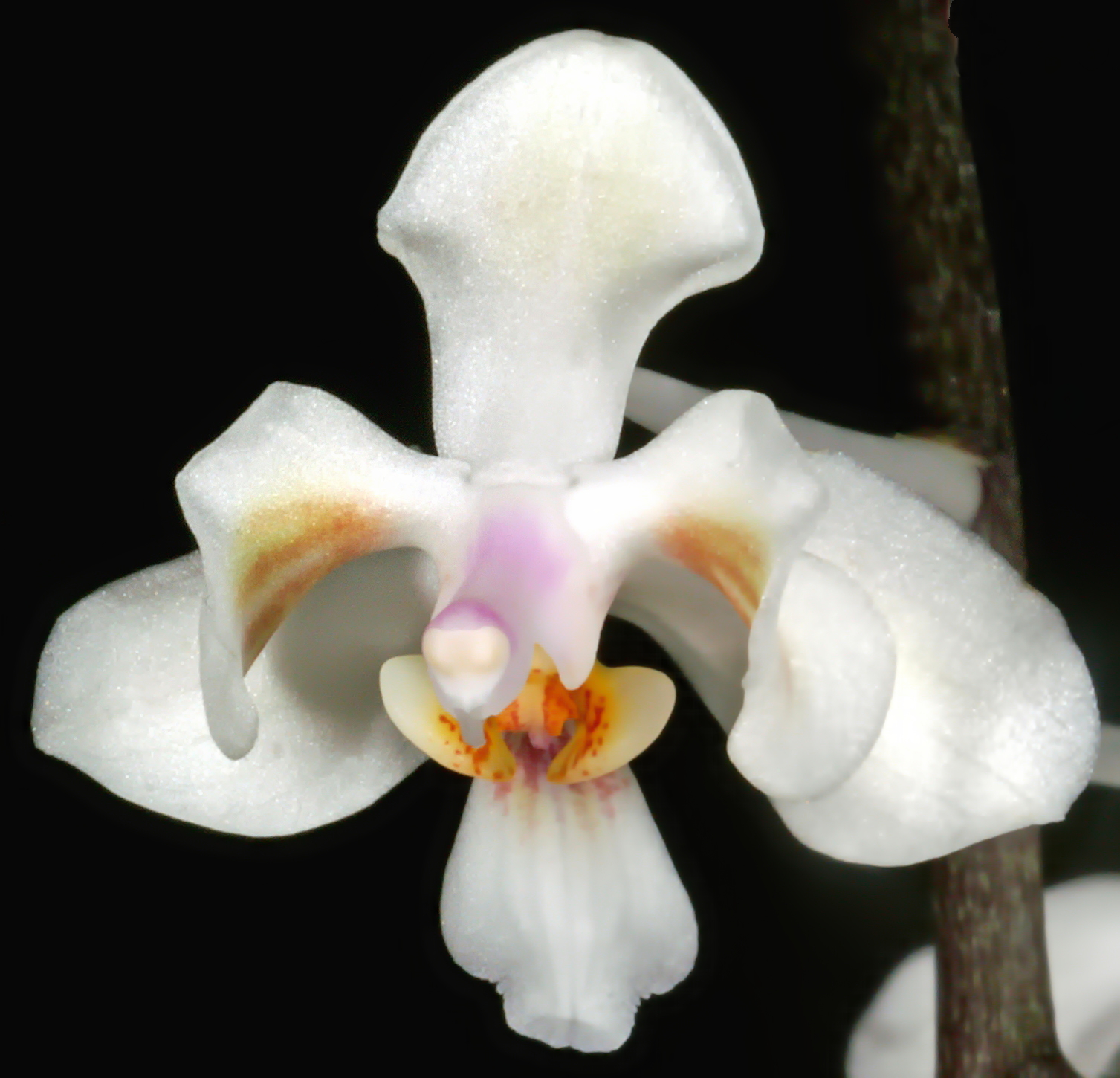

== Conservation ==
This species is protected under the CITES appendix II regulations of international trade. Endemic species of Sulawesi easily go extinct, as habitat destruction in favour of housing areas, plantations, roads or illegal logging occurs.
