= Phalaenopsis × amphitrite =

Scientific classification
- Kingdom: Plantae
- Clade: Tracheophytes
- Clade: Angiosperms
- Clade: Monocots
- Order: Asparagales
- Family: Orchidaceae
- Subfamily: Epidendroideae
- Genus: Phalaenopsis
- Species: P. × amphitrite

Binomial name
- Phalaenopsis × amphitrite Kraenzl.
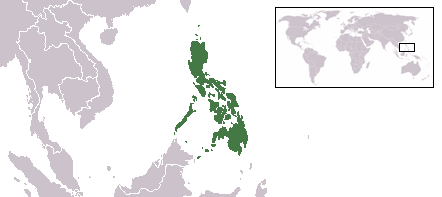
- Distribution of Phalaenopsis × amphitrite

Species of orchid

Phalaenopsis × amphitrite is a species of orchid native to the Philippines. It is a natural hybrid of Phalaenopsis sanderiana and Phalaenopsis stuartiana.

== History ==
Like all known herbarium specimens from Friedrich Wilhelm Ludwig Kraenzlin, the type specimen faced destruction during the second world war in Berlin.

== Conservation ==
This species appears to be infrequent and uncommon.
