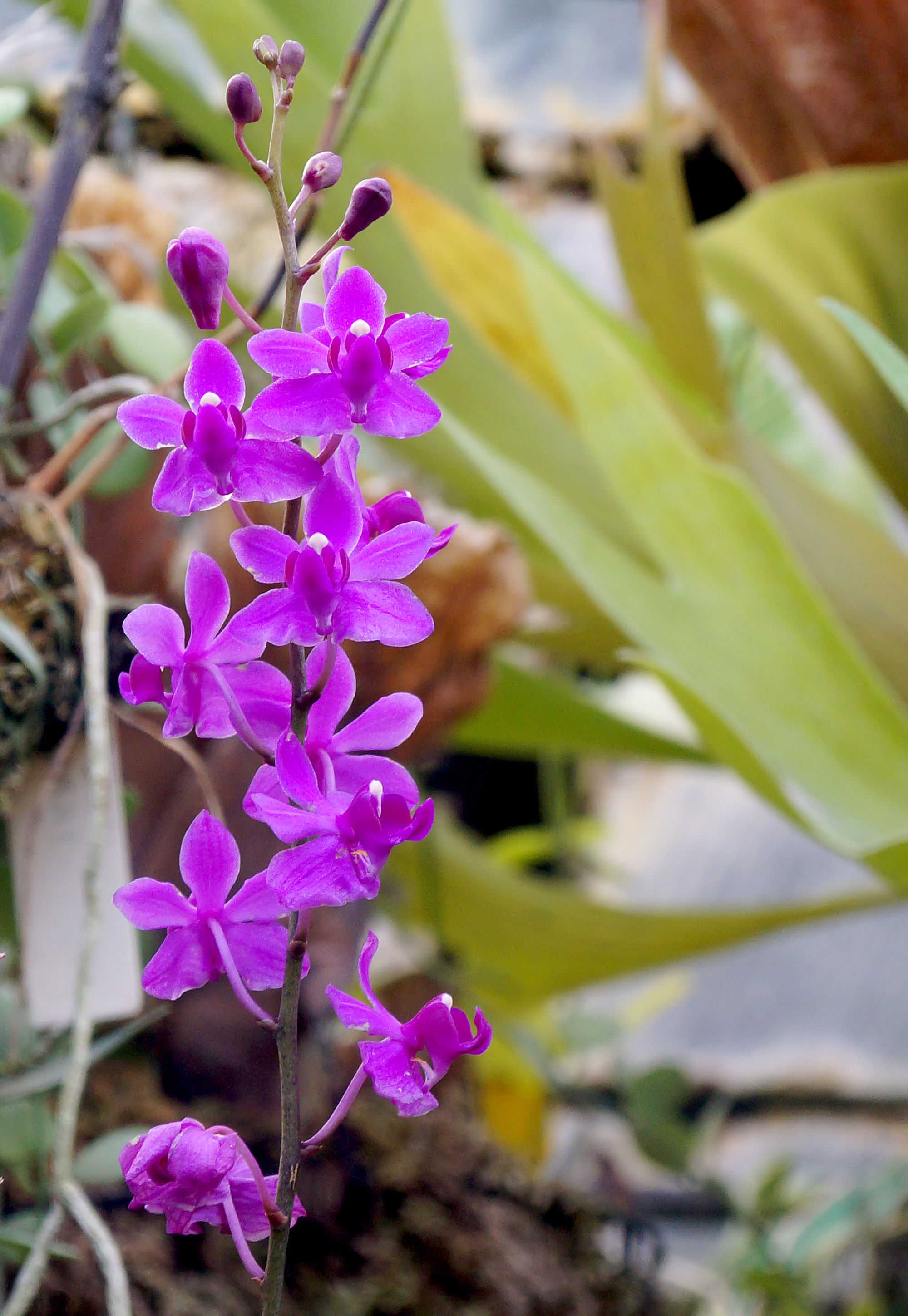
- Inflorescence detail
- CITES Appendix II (CITES)

Scientific classification
- Kingdom: Plantae
- Clade: Tracheophytes
- Clade: Angiosperms
- Clade: Monocots
- Order: Asparagales
- Family: Orchidaceae
- Subfamily: Epidendroideae
- Genus: Phalaenopsis
- Species: P. buyssoniana

Binomial name
- Phalaenopsis buyssoniana Rchb.f.
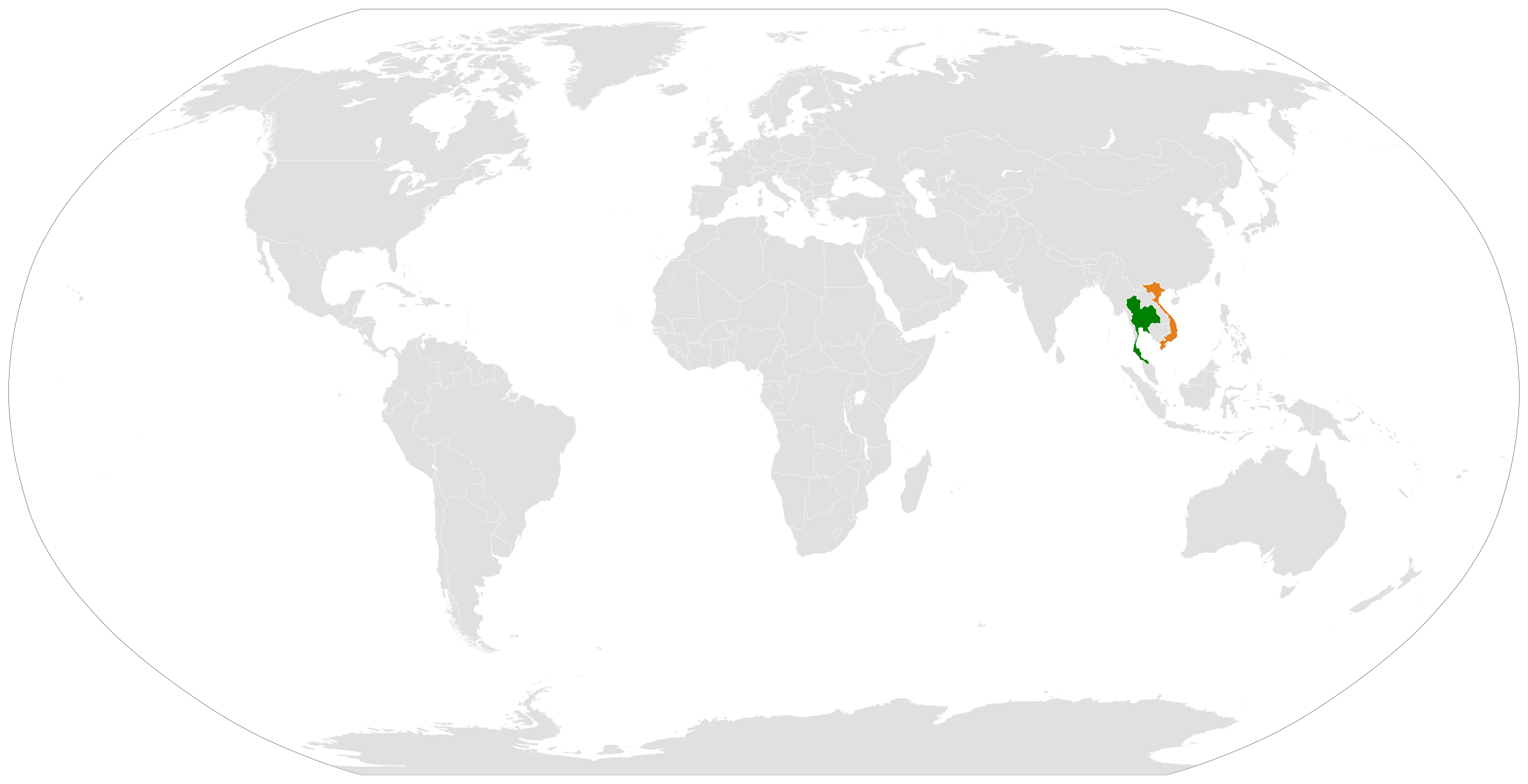
- distribution of Phalaenopsis buyssoniana

Synonyms
- Doritis buyssoniana (Rchb.f.) J.M.H.Shaw; Doritis pulcherrima var. buyssoniana (Rchb.f.) Aver.

= Phalaenopsis buyssoniana =

Species of epiphytic orchid

Phalaenopsis buyssoniana is a species of orchid native to Thailand and Vietnam.

== Description ==
It is a robust terrestrial, lithophyte with oblong-elliptic to elliptic-obovate, silvery green leaves up to 25 cm in length and 9.5 cm in width. The surface is finely spotted in purple. Rose-pink flowers are produced on erect racemes. This species has been found to be tetraploid with a chromosome count of 76 chromosomes (2n = 2x = 76). It similar in appearance to Phalaenopsis pulcherrima, but it has larger flowers, larger leaves and longer inflorescences. These attractive features creates a high demand of the species. Problems with fruit set may arise in the creation of interspecific hybrids.

== Etymology ==
The specific epithet buyssoniana honours the French botanist François-Charles, comte du Buysson (1825–1906).

== Conservation ==
The IUCN has not assessed this species conservation status. It is however protected unter the CITES appendix II regulations of international trade.
