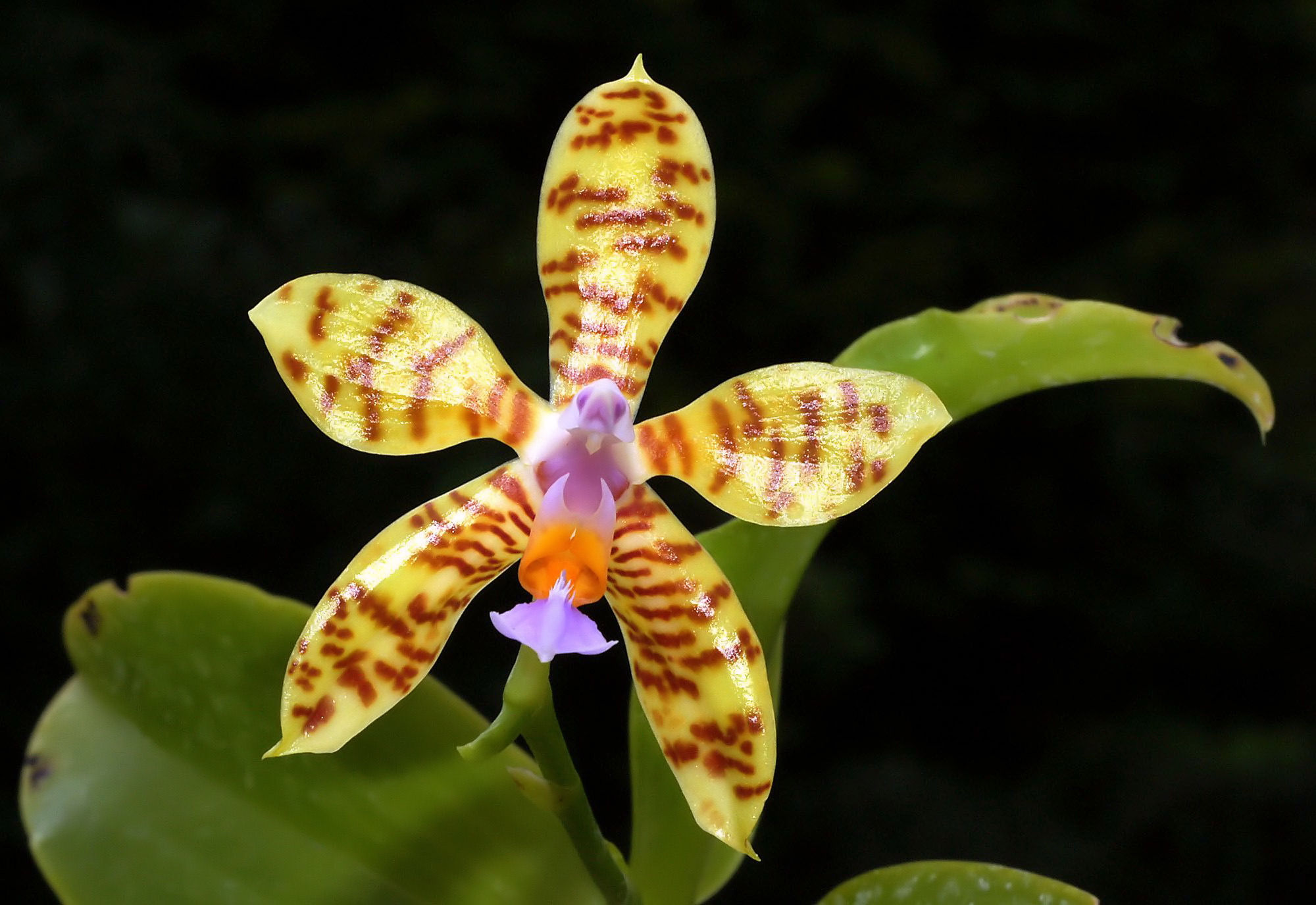
- Phalaenopsis fasciata

Scientific classification
- Kingdom: Plantae
- Clade: Tracheophytes
- Clade: Angiosperms
- Clade: Monocots
- Order: Asparagales
- Family: Orchidaceae
- Subfamily: Epidendroideae
- Genus: Phalaenopsis
- Species: P. fasciata

Binomial name
- Phalaenopsis fasciata (Rchb. f.) Shim 1982

Synonyms
- Polychilos fasciata (Rchb. f.) Shim 1982

= Phalaenopsis fasciata =

Species of orchid

Phalaenopsis fasciata is an endemic species of orchid from the Philippines. The flower is small, dark yellow in color and contains thin brown stripes to petals and sepals. The color of this species is nearly identical to Phalaenopsis reichenbachiana but only differs in the lip detail which is not triangular.
