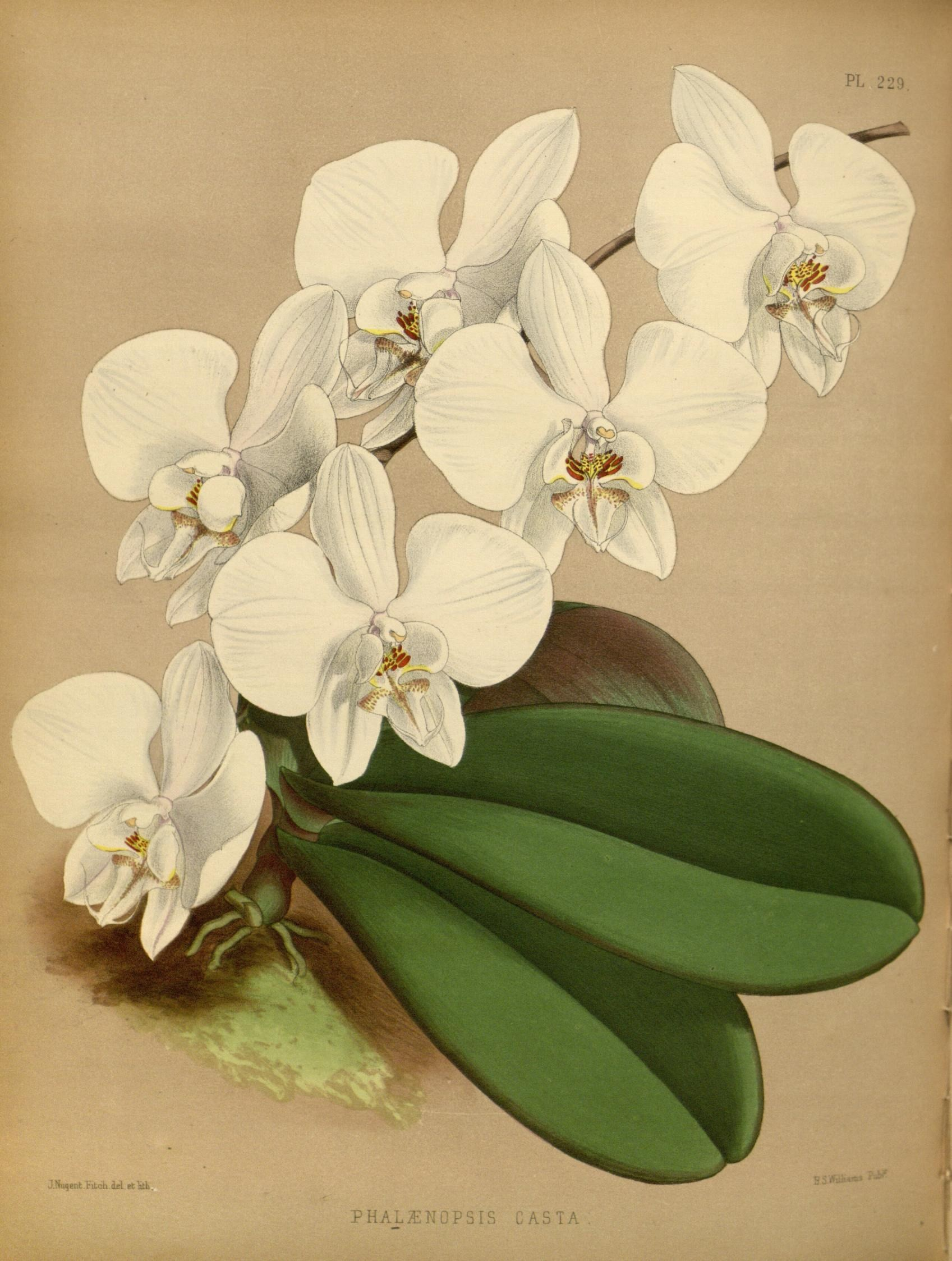
- Phalaenopsis × leucorrhoda as Phalaenopsis casta

Scientific classification
- Kingdom: Plantae
- Clade: Tracheophytes
- Clade: Angiosperms
- Clade: Monocots
- Order: Asparagales
- Family: Orchidaceae
- Subfamily: Epidendroideae
- Genus: Phalaenopsis
- Species: P. × leucorrhoda

Binomial name
- Phalaenopsis × leucorrhoda Rchb.f.
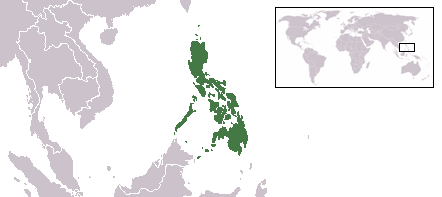
- Distribution of Phalaenopsis × leucorrhoda

Synonyms
- Phalaenopsis × casta Rchb.f.; Phalaenopsis × cynthia Rolfe; Phalaenopsis × rothschildiana Rchb.f.; Phalaenopsis × leucorrhoda var. grandiflora T.Moore

= Phalaenopsis × leucorrhoda =

Species of orchid

Phalaenopsis × leucorrhoda is a species of orchid native to the Philippines. It is a natural hybrid of Phalaenopsis aphrodite and Phalaenopsis schilleriana.

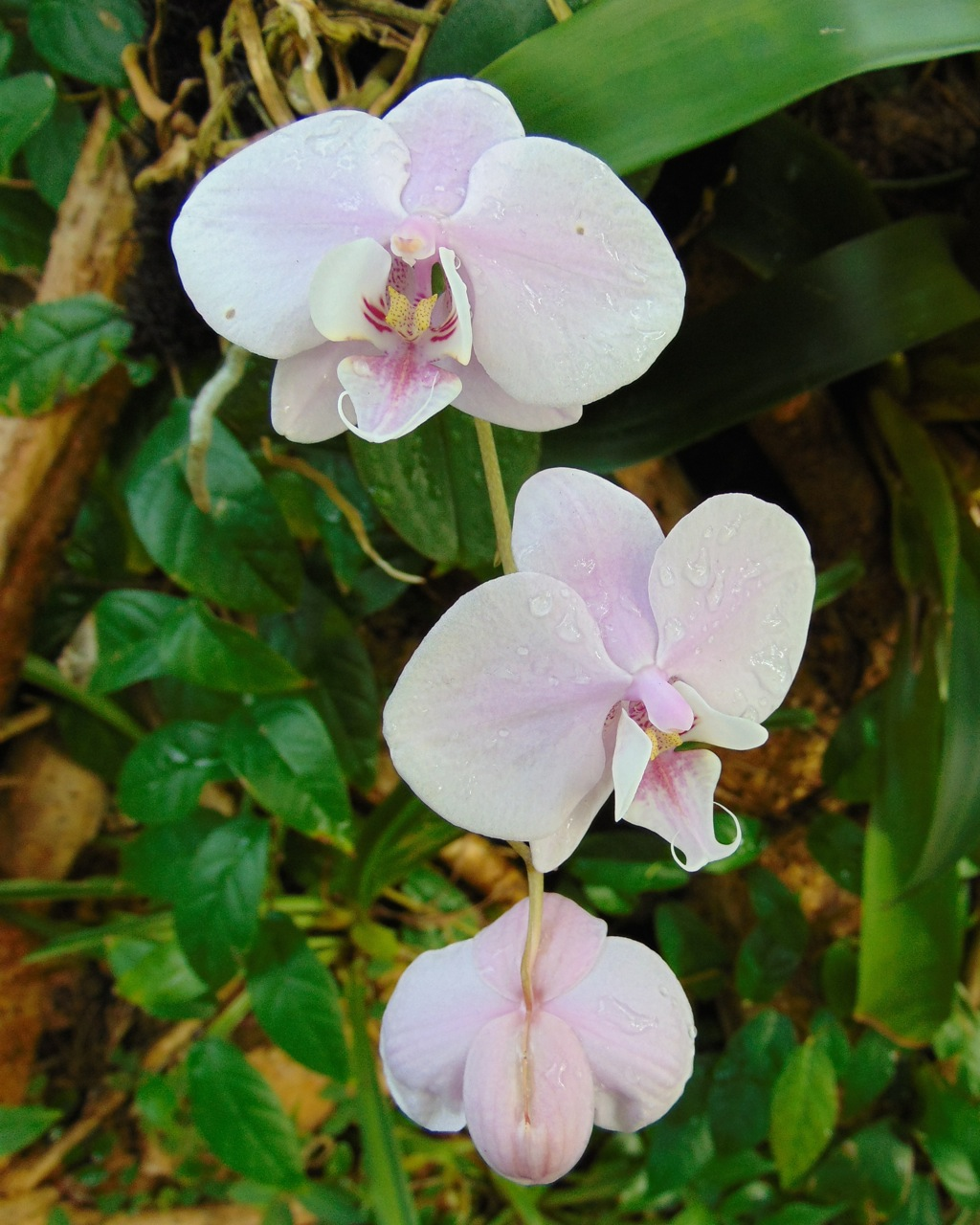
Phalaenopsis × leucorrhoda as Phalaenopsis × rothschildiana

== Etymology ==
The specific epithet leucorrhoda, composed of leuco meaning white and rhodo meaning rose-coloured, is derived from the floral coloration.

== Taxonomy ==
It has been confused with Phalaenopsis philippinensis, from which it differs in regard to the morphology of the callus of the labellum.
