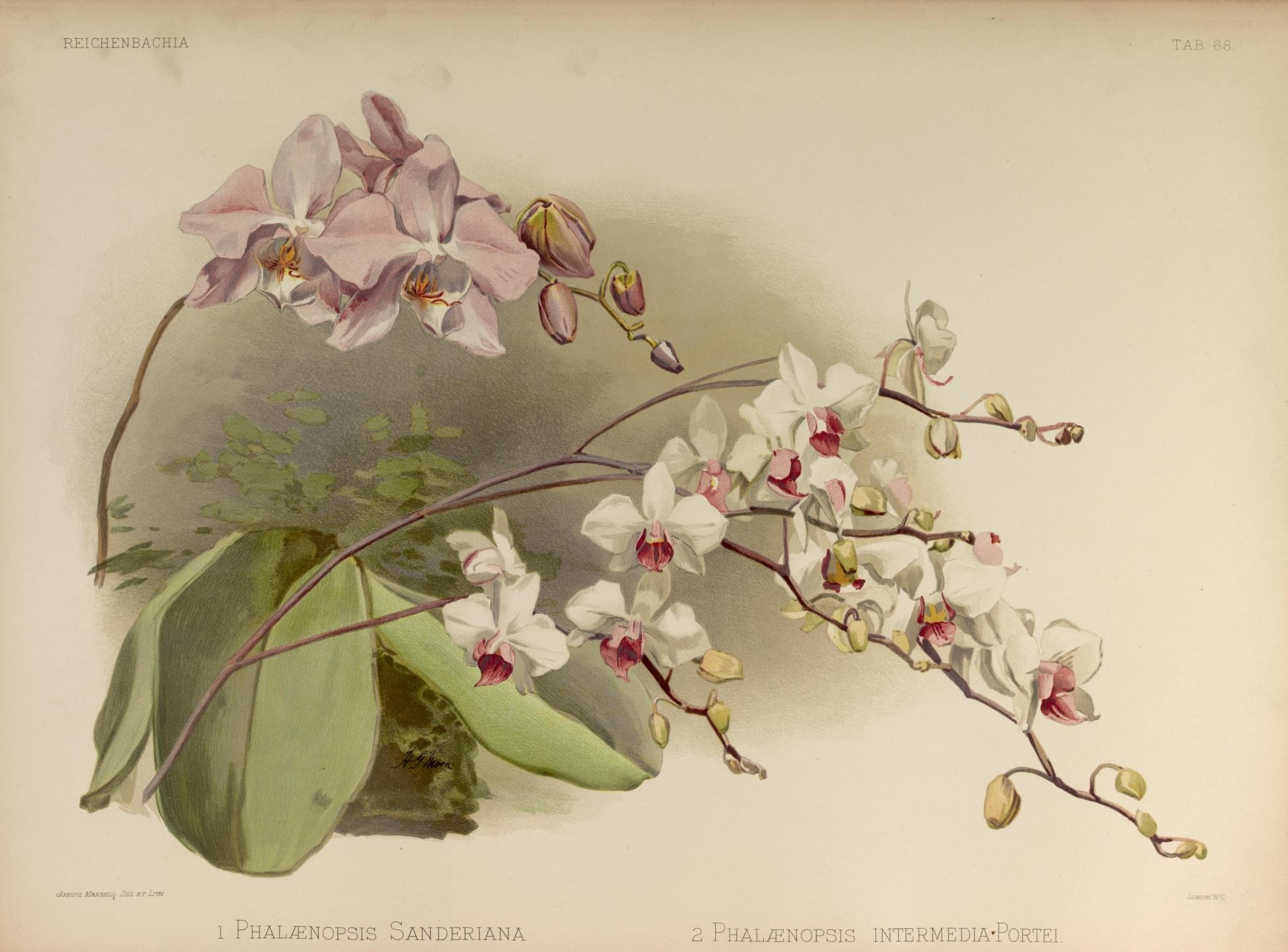
- Phalaenopsis × intermedia (lower) as illustrated in Sander's Reichenbachia II (1894)

Scientific classification
- Kingdom: Plantae
- Clade: Tracheophytes
- Clade: Angiosperms
- Clade: Monocots
- Order: Asparagales
- Family: Orchidaceae
- Subfamily: Epidendroideae
- Genus: Phalaenopsis
- Species: P. × intermedia

Binomial name
- Phalaenopsis × intermedia Lindl. (1852-3)

Synonyms
- Phalaenopsis × lobbii Veitch ex auct. (1852); Phalaenopsis × intermedia var. portei Rchb.f. (1863); Phalaenopsis × brymeriana Rchb.f. (1876); Phalaenopsis × intermedia var. brymeriana Rchb.f. (1876); Phalaenopsis × portei (Rchb.f.) Denning (1876); Phalaenopsis × delicata Rchb.f.(1882); Phalaenopsis × vesta H.J.Veitch (1894)

= Phalaenopsis × intermedia =

Species of orchid

Phalaenopsis × intermedia, the intermediate phalaenopsis, is a natural occurring hybrid of epiphytic orchid endemic and most commonly seen orchid species in the Philippines. A progeny of Phalaenopsis aphrodite and P. equestris, this orchid thrives in the heat of the lowlands, in primary and secondary forests at an altitude of sea level to 300 meters where it blooms all year round. Unlike other natural hybrid within the genus, P. × intermedia is seldom found growing within the range of its parent species and has formed sexually reproducing, stable populations in the wild. All red-lipped Phalaenopsis have pedigrees that can be traced back to this orchid.

== Gallery ==
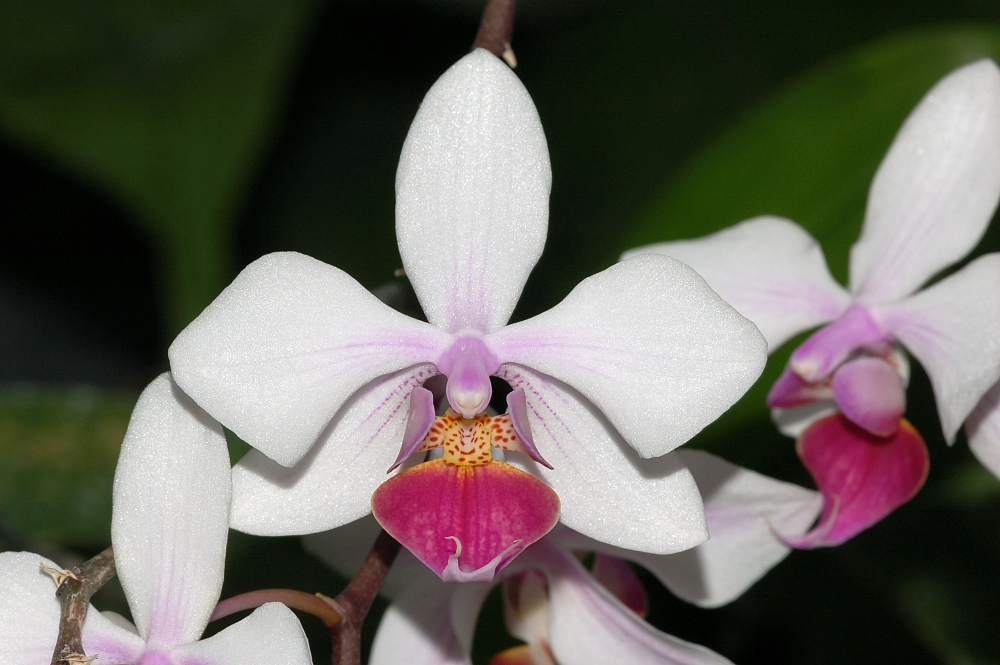
Flower

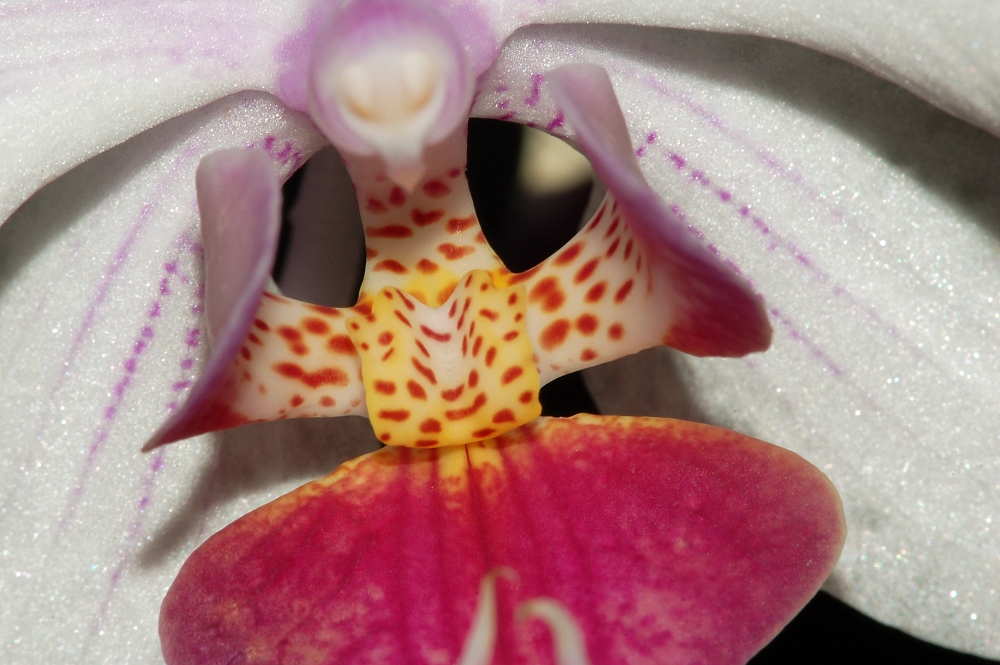
Flower detail
