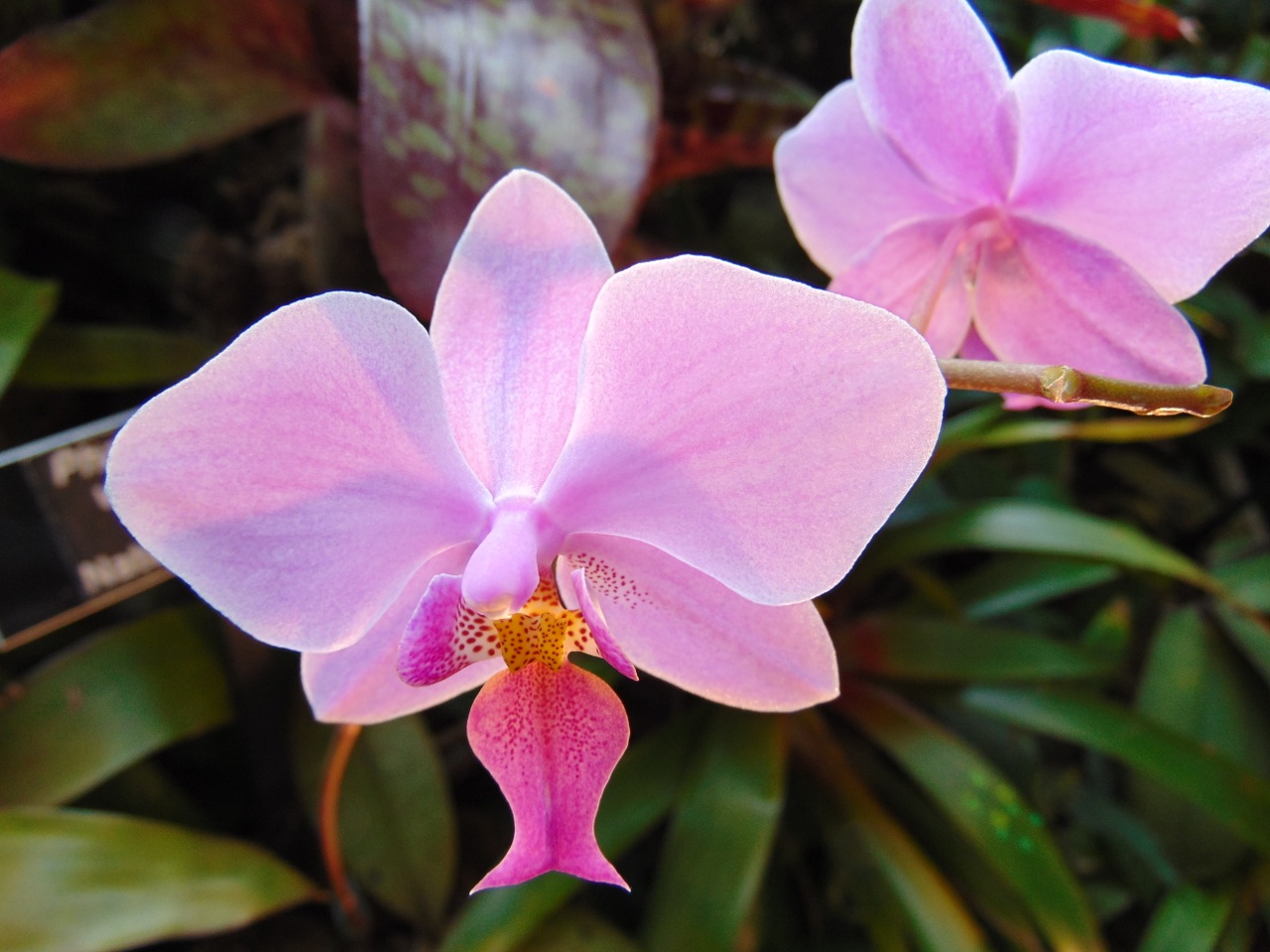
- Inflorescence detail

Scientific classification
- Kingdom: Plantae
- Clade: Tracheophytes
- Clade: Angiosperms
- Clade: Monocots
- Order: Asparagales
- Family: Orchidaceae
- Subfamily: Epidendroideae
- Genus: Phalaenopsis
- Species: P. × veitchiana

Binomial name
- Phalaenopsis × veitchiana Rchb.f.
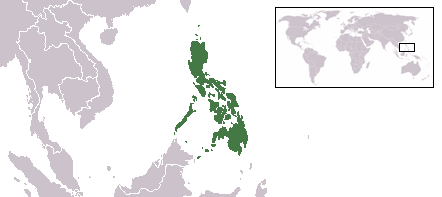
- Distribution of Phalaenopsis × veitchiana

Synonyms
- Phalaenopsis × gertrudeae Quisumb.; Phalaenopsis × virataii Quisumb.

= Phalaenopsis × veitchiana =

Species of orchid

Phalaenopsis × veitchiana is a species of orchid endemic to the Philippines. It is a hybrid of Phalaenopsis equestris and Phalaenopsis schilleriana. It occurs naturally and has also been artificially re-created. It is named after the British horticulturalist Harry J. Veitch.
