= × Doritaenopsis =

Species of orchid

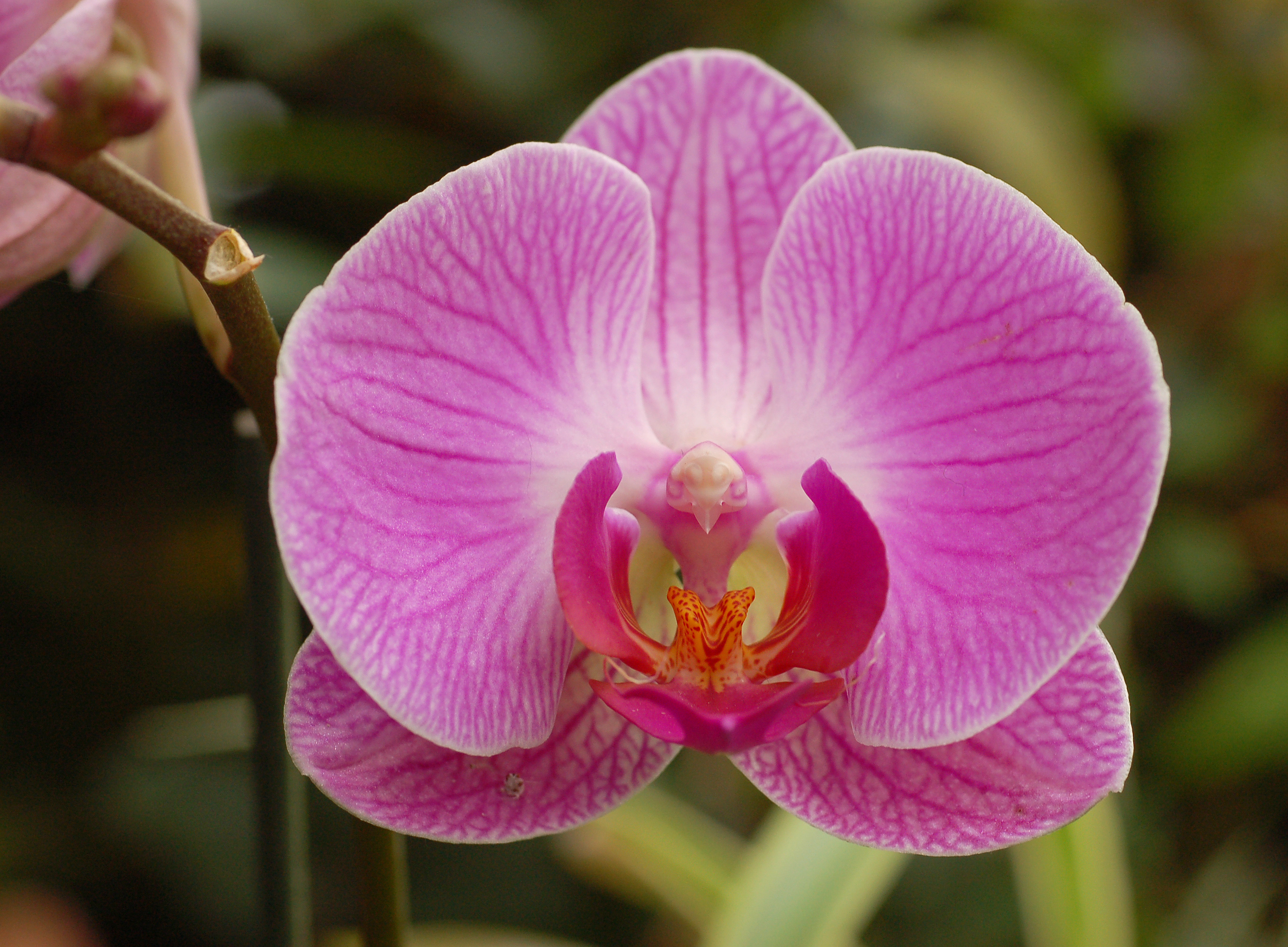
Cultivar 'Dorado' formerly placed in × Doritaenopsis

× Doritaenopsis (abbreviated Dtps. in the horticultural trade) was a genus of artificial hybrids first formally described in 1935 by André Guillaumin in the Archives du Muséum national d'histoire naturelle. The name was intended for hybrids involving Doritis and Phalaenopsis. As of May 2026, Doritis was considered to be a synonym of Phalaenopsis, so plants placed in × Doritaenopsis belong in Phalaenopsis.

In the 1950s, Doritis pulcherrima (now known as Phalaenopsis pulcherrima) was crossed with Phalaenopsis equestris producing × Doritaenopsis hybrids with more flowers with more intense pink than those of the Phalaenopsis parent and in 1975, Doritaenopsis Memoria Clarence Schubert 'Malibu Dream' was registered with the American Orchid Society, a specimen producing "an inflorescence nearly 8 ft (2.4 m) tall with five branches, 75 flowers and 29 buds", with "individual flowers measured 8.0 cm (3.1 in) across.

== Cultivation ==
The inflorescences should not be cut, as they will produce new flowers on old inflorescences. These hybrids produce many flowers, that last well into summer, have sharp colours and often multiple spikes. The tradeoff is slightly smaller flowers.
