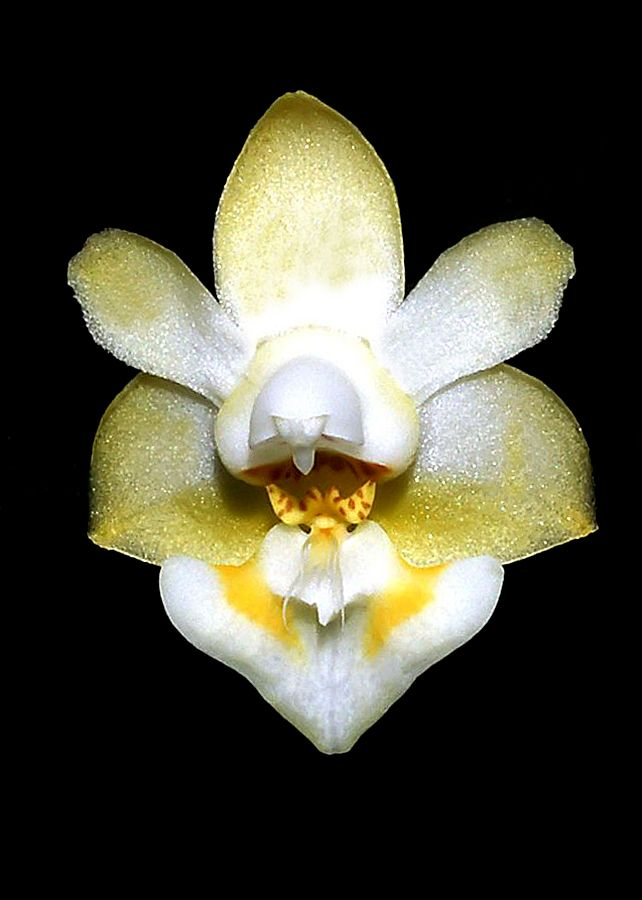
- Flower detail

Scientific classification
- Kingdom: Plantae
- Clade: Tracheophytes
- Clade: Angiosperms
- Clade: Monocots
- Order: Asparagales
- Family: Orchidaceae
- Subfamily: Epidendroideae
- Genus: Phalaenopsis
- Species: P. gibbosa

Binomial name
- Phalaenopsis gibbosa H.R.Sweet

Synonyms
- Doritis gibbosa (H.R.Sweet) T.Yukawa & K.Kita; Phalaenopsis gibbosa var. wlodarczykiana Roeth; Polychilos gibbosa (H.R.Sweet) Shim

= Phalaenopsis gibbosa =

Species of epiphytic orchid

Phalaenopsis gibbosa is a species of orchid native to China South-Central, Laos and Vietnam .

== Description ==
These epiphytic herbs have short stems, which are veiled by imbricating leaf bases. The elliptic to elliptic-obovate leaves are up to 12 cm long and 4.5 cm wide. From the leaf axils slender, up to 15 cm long, arching racemes or panicles arise, which produce 8-10 white flowers with greenish suffusion towards the apex of petals and sepals. The androeceum (i.e. male reproductive organs) consists of four pollinia in two pairs. The specific epithet gibbosa, from the Latin gibbosus meaning "with a pouch-like swelling", refers to the excavated area of the labellum beneath the anterior callus. It is found in humid evergreen forests on limestone hills at 722 m a.s.l. Flowering occurs throughout March-June.

== Taxonomy ==
This species is placed within the subgenus Parishianae. It is the sister species to Phalaenopsis lobbii and Phalaenopsis parishii.

== Confusion with Phalaenopsis thailandica ==
This species closely resembles Phalaenopsis thailandica O.Gruss & Roeth, which is a species described after differences were noticed from the type description in cultivated plants, which were labeled as Phalaenopsis gibbosa. In cultivation most plants under the category of Phalaenopsis gibbosa are in fact Phalaenopsis thailandica.

== Conservation ==
This species is protected unter the CITES appendix II regulations of international trade.
