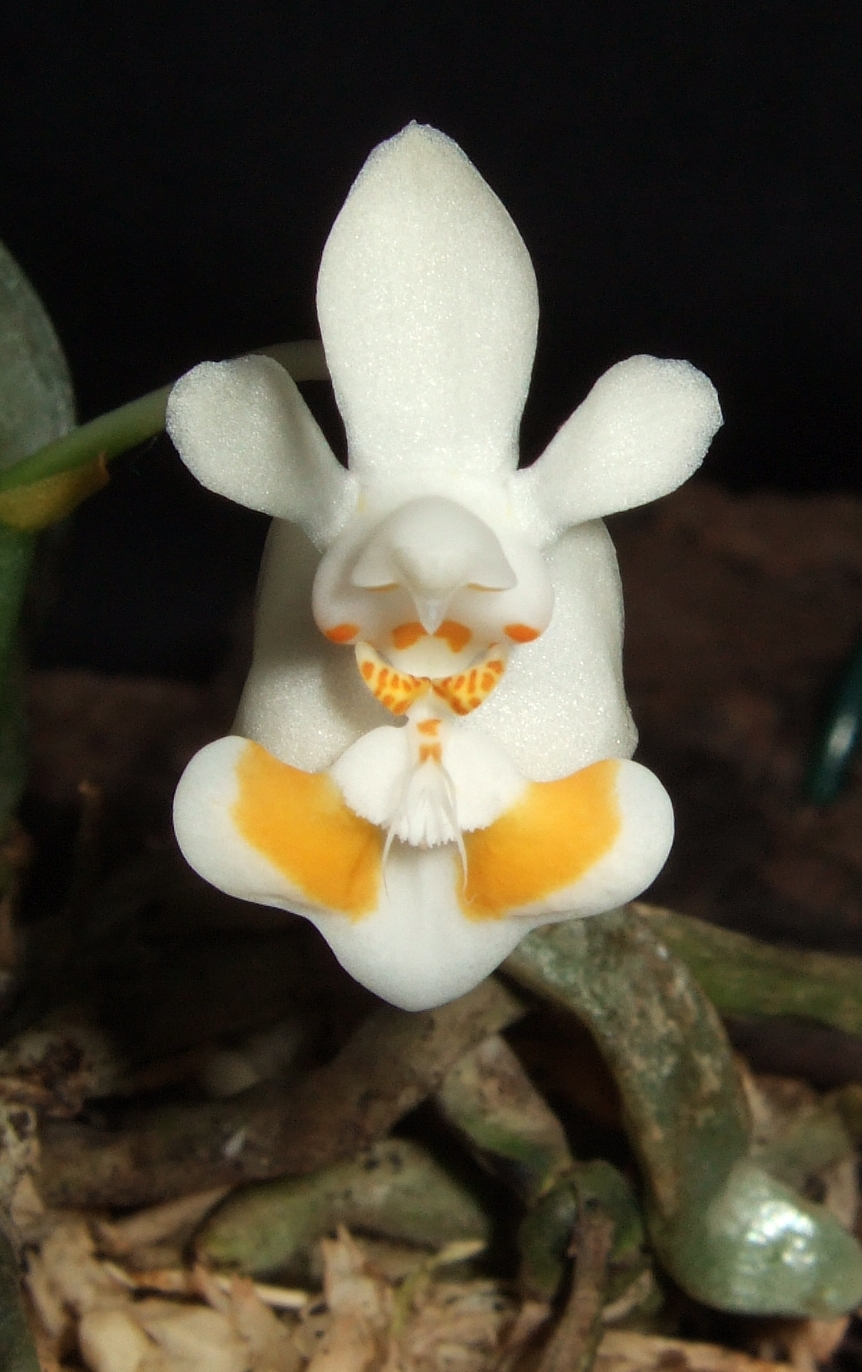
- Flower detail

Scientific classification
- Kingdom: Plantae
- Clade: Tracheophytes
- Clade: Angiosperms
- Clade: Monocots
- Order: Asparagales
- Family: Orchidaceae
- Subfamily: Epidendroideae
- Genus: Phalaenopsis
- Species: P. thailandica

Binomial name
- Phalaenopsis thailandica O.Gruss & Roeth
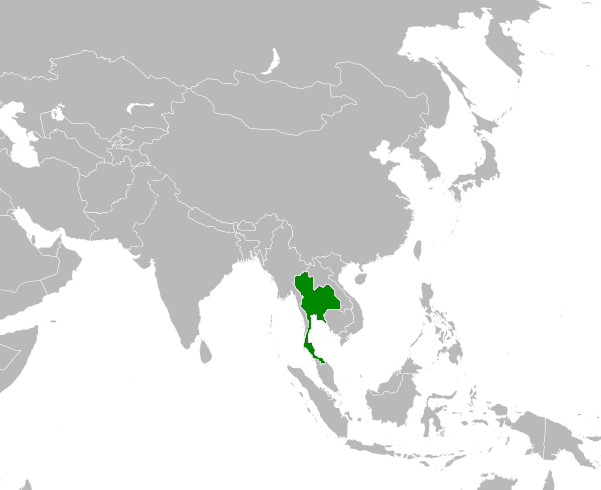
- distribution of Phalaenopsis thailandica

Synonyms
- Phalaenopsis thailandica f. aurea O.Gruss & Roeth

= Phalaenopsis thailandica =

Species of epiphytic orchid

Phalaenopsis thailandica is a species of orchid native to Thailand. It was described by Olaf Gruss and Jürgen Roeth, after differences from the type description were noticed in cultivated plants labeled as Phalaenopsis gibbosa. The specific epithet thailandica refers to this species native range in Thailand.

== Confusion with Phalaenopsis gibbosa ==
This species closely resembles Phalaenopsis gibbosa H.R.Sweet. It differs from Phalaenopsis gibbosa in the petal and sepal colouration, which lacks greenish suffusion in Phalaenopsis thailandica, which also has larger yellow areas on the lateral lobes of the labellum. In cultivation most plants under the category of Phalaenopsis gibbosa are in fact Phalaenopsis thailandica.

== Conservation ==
This species is protected under the CITES Appendix II regulations of international trade.
