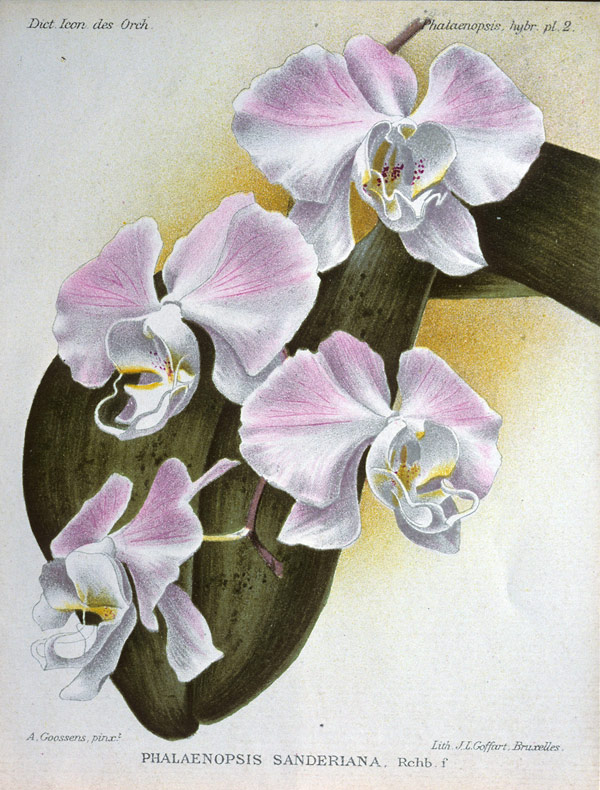

Scientific classification
- Kingdom: Plantae
- Clade: Tracheophytes
- Clade: Angiosperms
- Clade: Monocots
- Order: Asparagales
- Family: Orchidaceae
- Subfamily: Epidendroideae
- Genus: Phalaenopsis
- Species: P. sanderiana

Binomial name
- Phalaenopsis sanderiana Rchb.f

Synonyms
- Phalaenopsis alcicornis Rchb.f.; Phalaenopsis amabilis var aphrodite subvar. sanderiana; Phalaenopsis aphrodite var sanderiana; Phalaenopsis amabilis var sanderiana

= Phalaenopsis sanderiana =

Species of orchid

Phalaenopsis sanderiana is an orchid in the genus Phalaenopsis that is native to the Philippines. It was named in honour of M. Fredrick Sander. It is a pendant growing epiphyte with epileptic, rounded tip pendulous leaves. Inflorescence are showy of 15 to 20 on 32 inch long raceme.

== Varieties ==
- Phalaenopsis sanderiana var. marmorata Rchb.f. Gard. Chron. n.s. 20:812. 1883.
- Phalaenopsis sanderiana subvar. alba Veitch Man. Orchid. Pl. 7:35. 1891
- Phalaenopsis sanderiana f. alba (Veitch) Christenson. Phalaenopsis: a monograph: 207. 2001

== Gallery ==
Photos of Phalaenopsis sanderiana

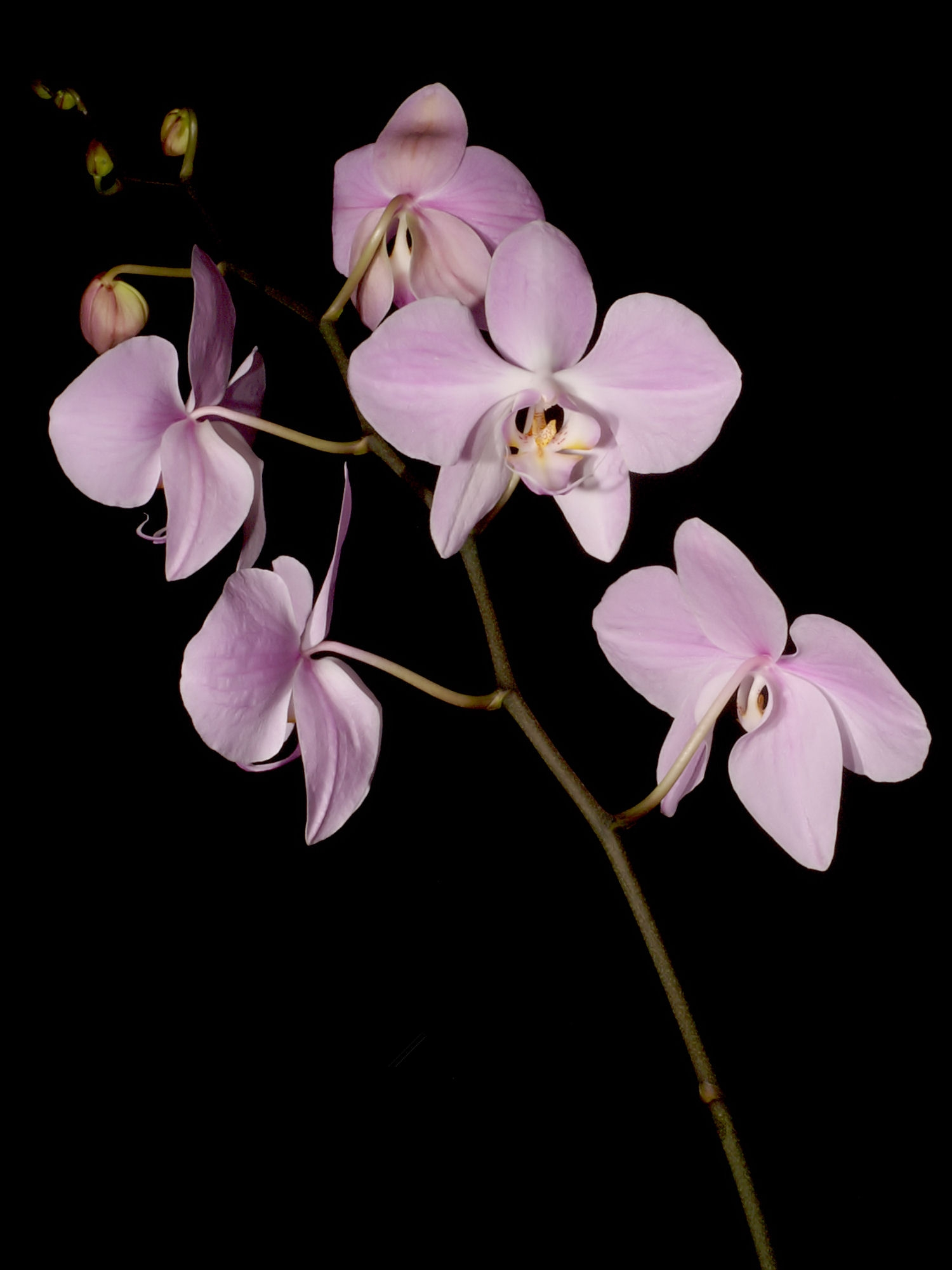
Phalaenopsis sanderiana
inflorescence

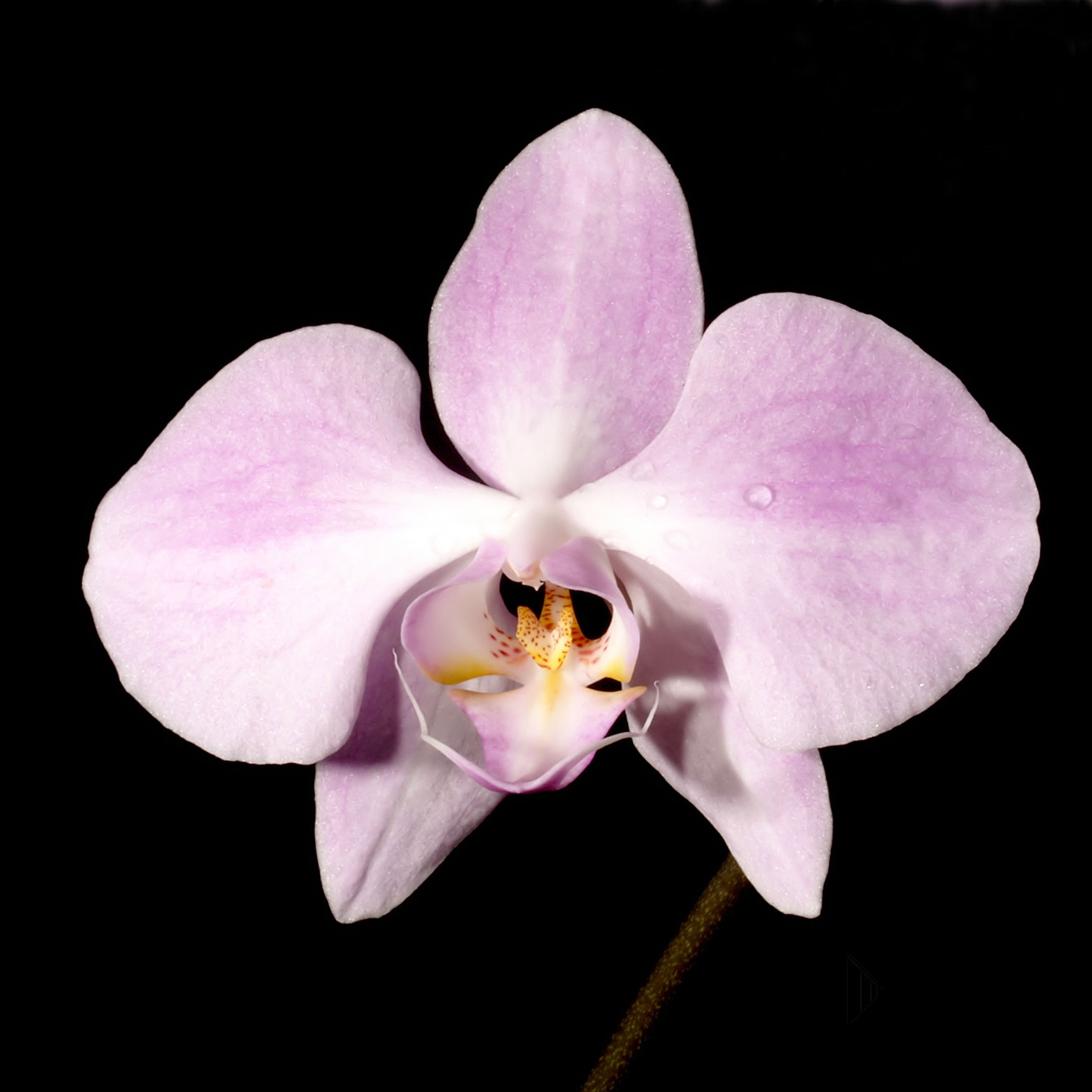
Phalaenopsis sanderiana
flower

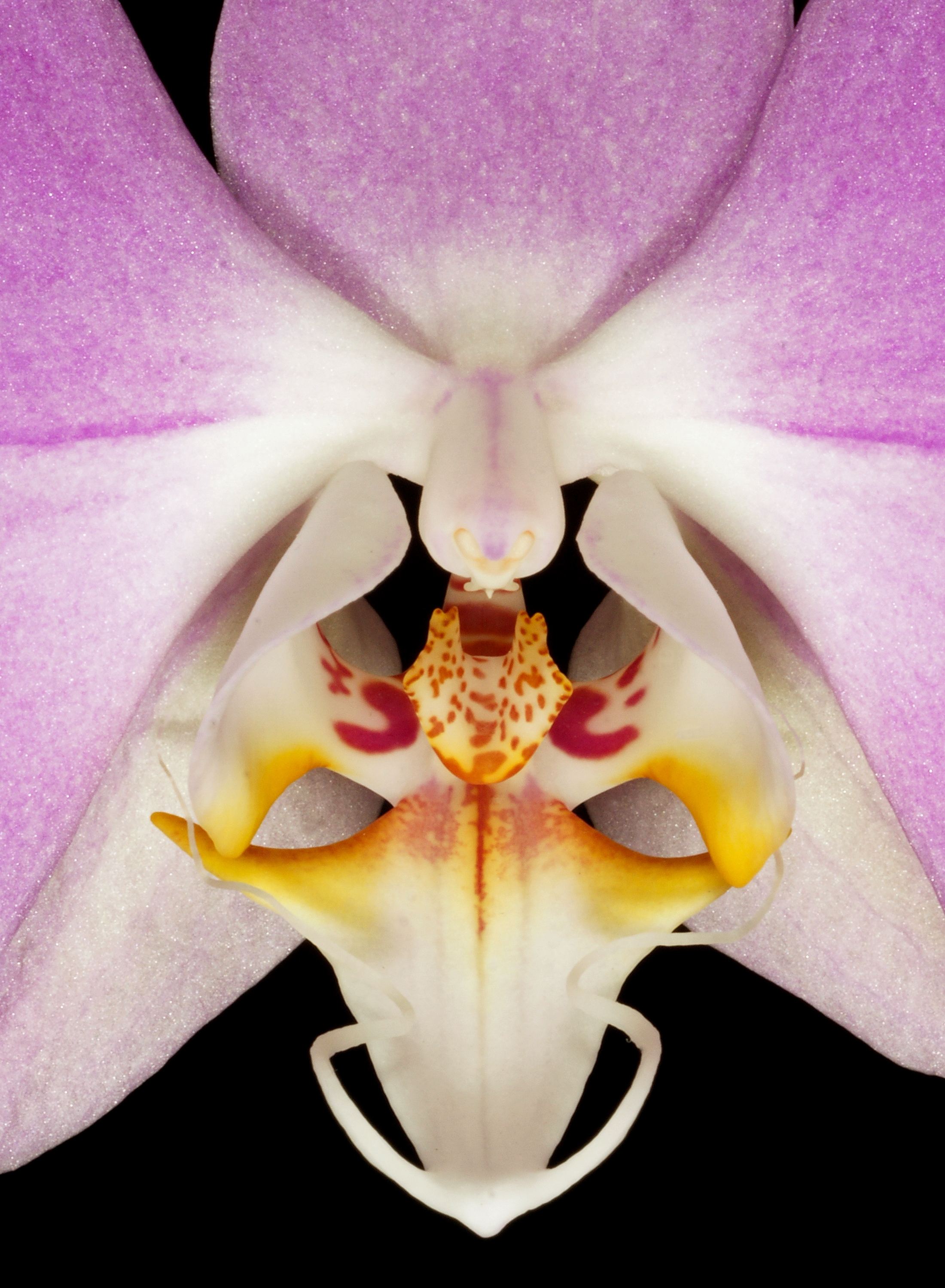
Phalaenopsis sanderiana
callus
