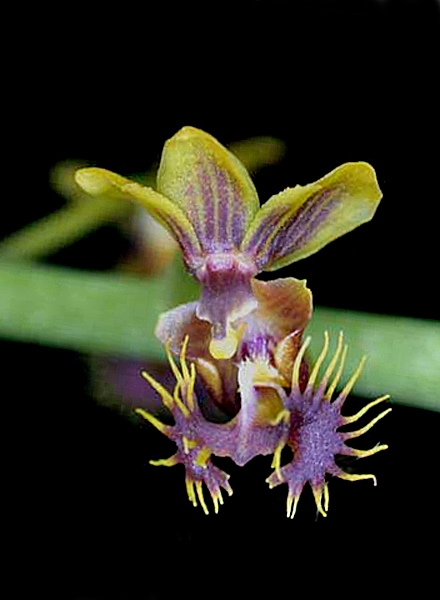
- Flower detail

Conservation status
- CITES Appendix II (CITES)

Scientific classification
- Kingdom: Plantae
- Clade: Tracheophytes
- Clade: Angiosperms
- Clade: Monocots
- Order: Asparagales
- Family: Orchidaceae
- Subfamily: Epidendroideae
- Genus: Phalaenopsis
- Subgenus: Phalaenopsis subg. Ornithochilus
- Species: P. difformis

Binomial name
- Phalaenopsis difformis (Wall. ex Lindl.) Kocyan & Schuit.

Varieties
- Phalaenopsis difformis var. difformis; Phalaenopsis difformis var. kinabaluensis (J.J.Wood, A.Lamb & Shim) Kocyan & Schuit.

Synonyms
- Aerides difformis Wall. ex Lindl.; Ornithochilus difformis (Wall. ex Lindl.) Schltr.; Sarcochilus difformis (Wall. ex Lindl.) Tang & F.T.Wang; Trichoglottis diformis (Wall. ex Lindl.) T.B.Nguyen & D.H.Duong; Synonyms of Phalaenopsis difformis var. difformis: Ornithochilus delavayi Finet; Ornithochilus doritoides (Guillaumin) R.Rice; Ornithochilus eublepharon Hance; Ornithochilus fuscus Wall. ex Lindl.; Vanda doritoides Guillaumin; Synonyms of Phalaenopsis difformis var. kinabaluensis: Ornithochilus difformis var. kinabaluensis J.J.Wood, A.L.Lamb & Shim; Ornithochilus kinabaluensis (J.J.Wood, A.L.Lamb & Shim) R.Rice & A.L.Lamb

= Phalaenopsis difformis =

Species of epiphytic orchid

Phalaenopsis difformis, also known as the dark brown Phalaenopsis, is a species of epiphytic orchid native to Assam, Borneo, China South-Central, China Southeast, East Himalaya, Laos, Malaya, Myanmar, Bangladesh, Nepal, Sumatera, Thailand, Vietnam and West Himalaya.

== Taxonomy ==
This species has a complex taxonomic history and has been previously assigned to several genera. Within this species two variations, Phalaenopsis difformis var. difformis and Phalaenopsis difformis var. kinabaluensis (J.J.Wood, A.L.Lamb & Shim) Kocyan & Schuit., are formally recognized.

== Description ==
The very short-stemmed plants bear few, coriaceous, elliptic-oblong, flat, spreading leaves between 7-16 cm in length and 3-4 cm in width. The flowers are of unusual shape for the genus and arise between late June to early July from pendulous, many-flowered, 20-30 cm long inflorescences, which exceed the leaves in length. The many-flowered inflorescences resemble a flying swarm of insects. The greenish-yellow flowers with brown bands are 1.2 cm wide. The most striking feature is the unusual shape of the labellum. It is much longer than the sepals and the recurved side lobes have a pectinate (i.e. comb-like) margin. This species has often been found growing on Glochidion heyneanum var. heyneanum (syn. Glochidion velutinum) trees at altitudes of 20 m in evergreen forests.

== Ecology ==
This species are lithophytes or epiphytes.

== Etymology ==
The specific epithet difformis is derived from Latin meaning misshapen or illformed. This refers to the highly unusual labellum.

== Conservation ==
The IUCN has not assessed this species conservation status. It is however protected unter the CITES appendix II regulations of international trade.
