= Phalaenopsis yingjiangensis =

Scientific classification
- Kingdom: Plantae
- Clade: Tracheophytes
- Clade: Angiosperms
- Clade: Monocots
- Order: Asparagales
- Family: Orchidaceae
- Subfamily: Epidendroideae
- Genus: Phalaenopsis
- Subgenus: Phalaenopsis subg. Ornithochilus
- Species: P. yingjiangensis

Binomial name
- Phalaenopsis yingjiangensis (Z.H.Tsi) Kocyan & Schuit.
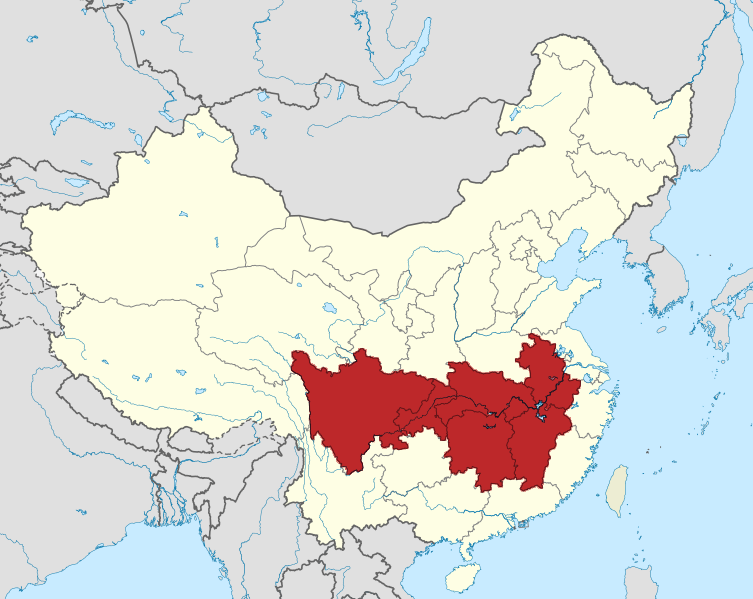
- Distribution of Phalaenopsis yingjiangensis

Synonyms
- Ornithochilus yingjiangensis Z.H.Tsi

Species of epiphytic orchid

Phalaenopsis yingjiangensis, also known as 盈江羽唇兰 (ying jiang yu chun lan) in Chinese, is a species of epiphytic orchid native to China South-Central.

== Description ==
Several, distichously arranged, obliquely oblong, nearly basal leaves with an acute apex are produced on a 2 cm long stem. The leaves are 8-13 cm long and 3-4 cm wide. The pendulous, commonly unbranched inflorescences, which exceed the leaves in length, bear many, pale yellow, widely opening flowers. They have brown stripes. Despite the specific epithet yingjiangensis, which refers to the Chinese locality Yingjiang, this species has also been recorded in Thailand and India.

== Ecology ==
Flowering occurs in August. The plants are found in evergreen broad-leaved forests at elevations of 1300–1400 m.

== Conservation ==
This species is protected unter the CITES appendix II regulations of international trade.
