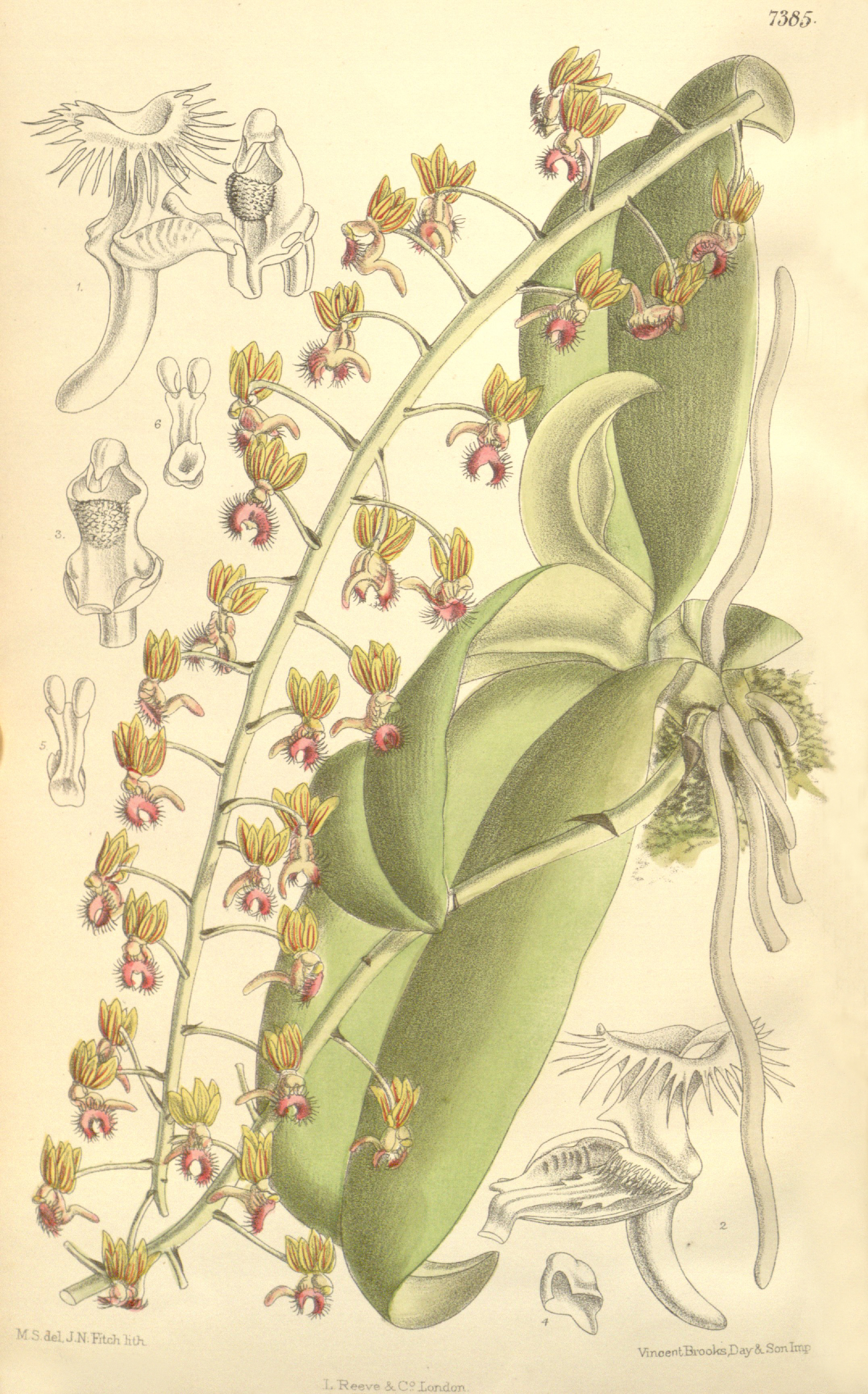
- Phalaenopsis difformis illustration

Scientific classification
- Kingdom: Plantae
- Clade: Tracheophytes
- Clade: Angiosperms
- Clade: Monocots
- Order: Asparagales
- Family: Orchidaceae
- Subfamily: Epidendroideae
- Genus: Phalaenopsis
- Subgenus: Phalaenopsis subg. Ornithochilus (Wall. ex Lindl.) Kocyan & Schuit.

Species
- See here

= Phalaenopsis subg. Ornithochilus =

Subgenus of flowering plants

Phalaenopsis subg. Ornithochilus is a subgenus of the genus Phalaenopsis native to Southeast Asia and the Indian Himalayas.

== Description ==
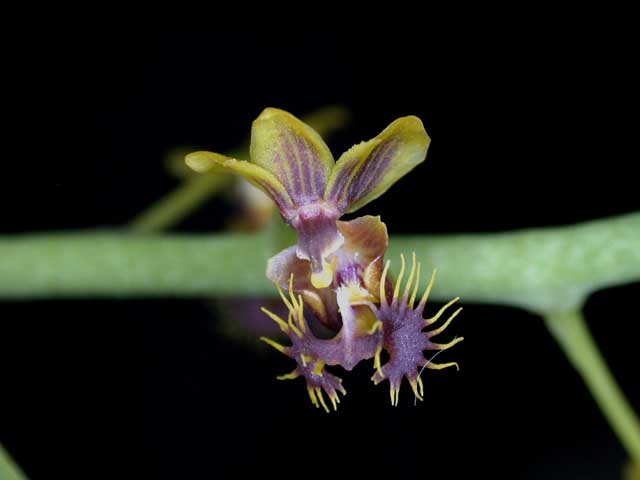
Phalaenopsis difformis flower

=== Vegetative characteristics ===
The species are monopodial, epiphytic herbs.

=== Generative characteristics ===
The flowers are small to medium sized. The spurred labellum is immobile. The column is 0.1–0.3 cm long.

== Taxonomy ==
=== Publication ===
It was first published as Aerides sect. Ornithochilus Wallich ex Lindley by John Lindley based on previous work by Nathaniel Wallich in 1833. It was later integrated into the genus Phalaenopsis Blume on the subgeneric level as Phalaenopsis subg. Ornithochilus (Wall. ex Lindl.) Kocyan & Schuit. published by Alexander Kocyan and André Schuiteman in 2014.

=== Species ===
It consists of the following species:

- Phalaenopsis cacharensis (Barbhuiya, B.K.Dutta & Schuit.) Kocyan & Schuit.
- Phalaenopsis difformis (Wall. ex Lindl.) Kocyan & Schuit.
- Phalaenopsis yingjiangensis (Z.H.Tsi) Kocyan & Schuit.
