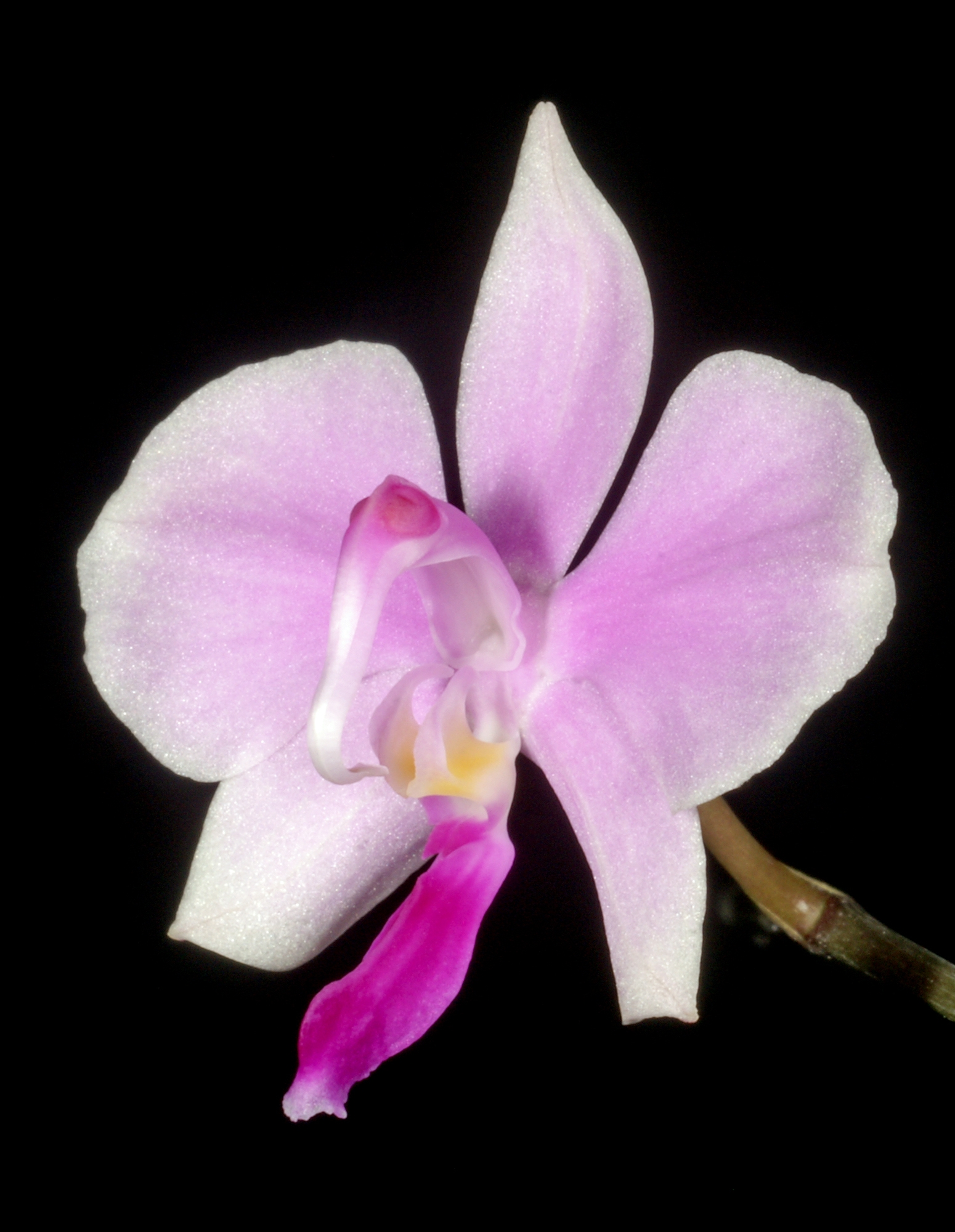
- Flower of Phalaenopsis lowii

Scientific classification
- Kingdom: Plantae
- Clade: Embryophytes
- Clade: Tracheophytes
- Clade: Spermatophytes
- Clade: Angiosperms
- Clade: Monocots
- Order: Asparagales
- Family: Orchidaceae
- Subfamily: Epidendroideae
- Genus: Phalaenopsis
- Species: P. lowii

Binomial name
- Phalaenopsis lowii Rchb.f.

Synonyms
- Polychilos lowii (Rchb.f.) Shim; Doritis lowii (Rchb.f.) T.Yukawa & K.Kita

= Phalaenopsis lowii =

Species of orchid

Phalaenopsis lowii is a species of orchid found from Myanmar to western Thailand.

== History ==
Phalaenopsis lowii was discovered by the Reverend C.S. Parish, when he travelled to Moulmein, Myanmar. Introduced in culture by the firm Low and Co. in 1861, it was named in the honor of Hugh Low, a collector of plants and a colonial administrator in Labuan, Borneo. General E.S. Berkeley writes on the species, "Phalaenopsis lowii lives in a zone of low hill limestones whose altitude does not exceed 60 meters. Precipitation is abundant during a great part of the year and the rivers numerous. From the end of November to the beginning of January the dry period occurs, and leaves and stalks disappear. Only the roots remain, which do not push any more but that the night dew maintains in good condition. At the beginning of March the vegetation appears again with the first precipitation. The plants are mainly on the North-Eastern side of the hills and thus protected from the hot seasons of the afternoon. They push nevertheless in very luminous situations. In culture, the foliage is not obligatorily deciduous. In all the cases the rest period should not exceed two months." Well known in cultures at the end of the 19th century (its culture was rather delicate and it was necessary to place the plants along the glass), Phalaenopsis lowii seemed to have disappeared. It was recently rediscovered in the West of Thailand, in zones of limestones, at an altitude from 700 to 800 meters either in epiphytic situation on trunks, or directly on the limestones cliffs where some fissures allow the accumulation of leaves producing a little humus. From December to January, during the dry season, the plants lose their foliage. The rains begin again in July and the plants survive thanks to ambient moisture and fog. The plants which develop on the trees are sheltered sun and preserve their leaves. Flowering takes place in October.
