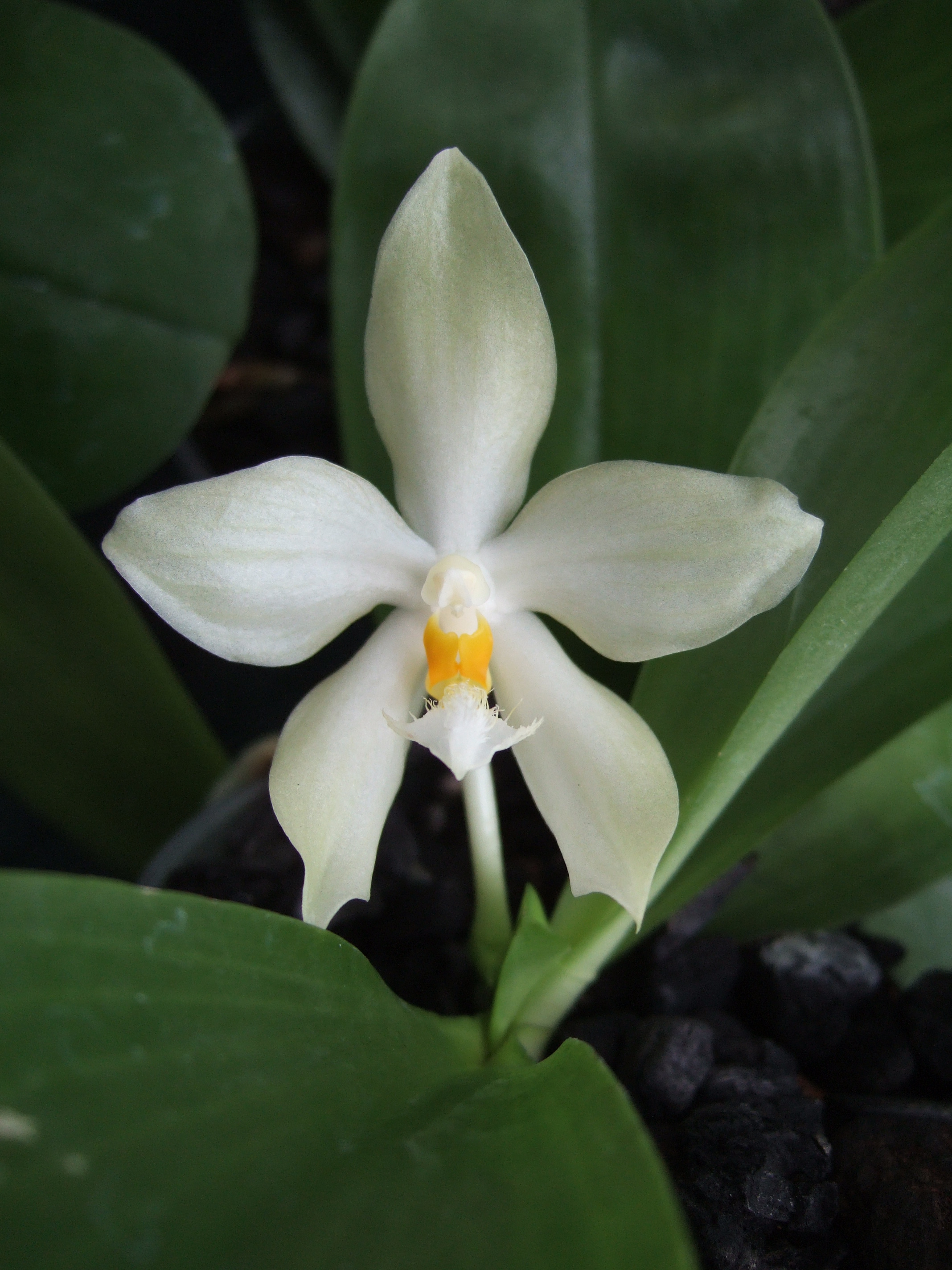

Conservation status
- Critically Endangered (IUCN 3.1)

Scientific classification
- Kingdom: Plantae
- Clade: Tracheophytes
- Clade: Angiosperms
- Clade: Monocots
- Order: Asparagales
- Family: Orchidaceae
- Subfamily: Epidendroideae
- Genus: Phalaenopsis
- Species: P. micholitzii

Binomial name
- Phalaenopsis micholitzii Sander ex H.J.Veitch
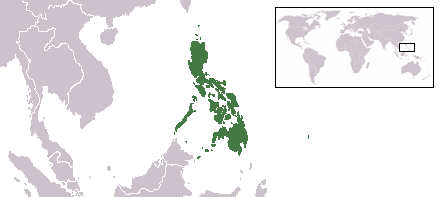
- Range map of Phalaenopsis micholitzii

Synonyms
- Polychilos micholitzii (Sander ex H.J.Veitch) Shim

= Phalaenopsis micholitzii =

Species of orchid

Phalaenopsis micholitzii is a species of plant under the phylum Tracheophyta in the family Orchidaceae.This Orchid species is found in mainly four different places in the Philippines Islands. Those four places are Luzon Island, Mindanao, Zamboanga Peninsula and in Camarines Sur near the Isarog mountain.

== Description ==
The plants leaves can grow to about 16 cm long and about 6 cm wide in oblong or oblanceolate shapes. This plant is a hot to warm growing epiphyte with a fleshy look to its leaves. This orchid blooms in the summer on an axillary bud and are short having 1 to 3 flowered inflorescence that carry a fleshy cupped flower. The blossoms are a star-shape having a delicate texture almost like wax. These flowers are spread out and open in turn. The flakes of both whorls are creamy-white or greenish-yellow and usually have a light white center. The flowers can grow to about 6-8 cm in diameter with little to no fragrance.

== Ecology ==
Its natural habitat is subtropical or tropical Forest with moist lowlands. This flower needs partial shade and light levels of at least 80000-12000 lux. The humidity level needs to be 80-85% throughout the year. Usually found low down on tree trunks or lianas near rivers.

== Etymology ==
The specific epithet is refers to the German orchid collector Wilhelm Micholitz, who worked as a plant collector for Henry Frederick Conrad Sander.

== Taxonomy ==
There appears to be conflicting information about the correct author of the taxon. The International Plant Names Index lists three entires of Phalaenopsis micholitzii. Several sources indicate, that Rolfe is the author, while others name Sander ex H.J.Veitch as the taxon authors.

== Conservation ==
Threats to Phalaenopsis micholitzii are habitat loss and degradation, and over-collection for trade. It is utilized as an ornamental plant, and it has anti-inflammatory and anti-bacterial properties in traditional Chinese medicine. While this plant is still classified as critically endangered, there are several conservation acts in place, including land and water protection and management.
