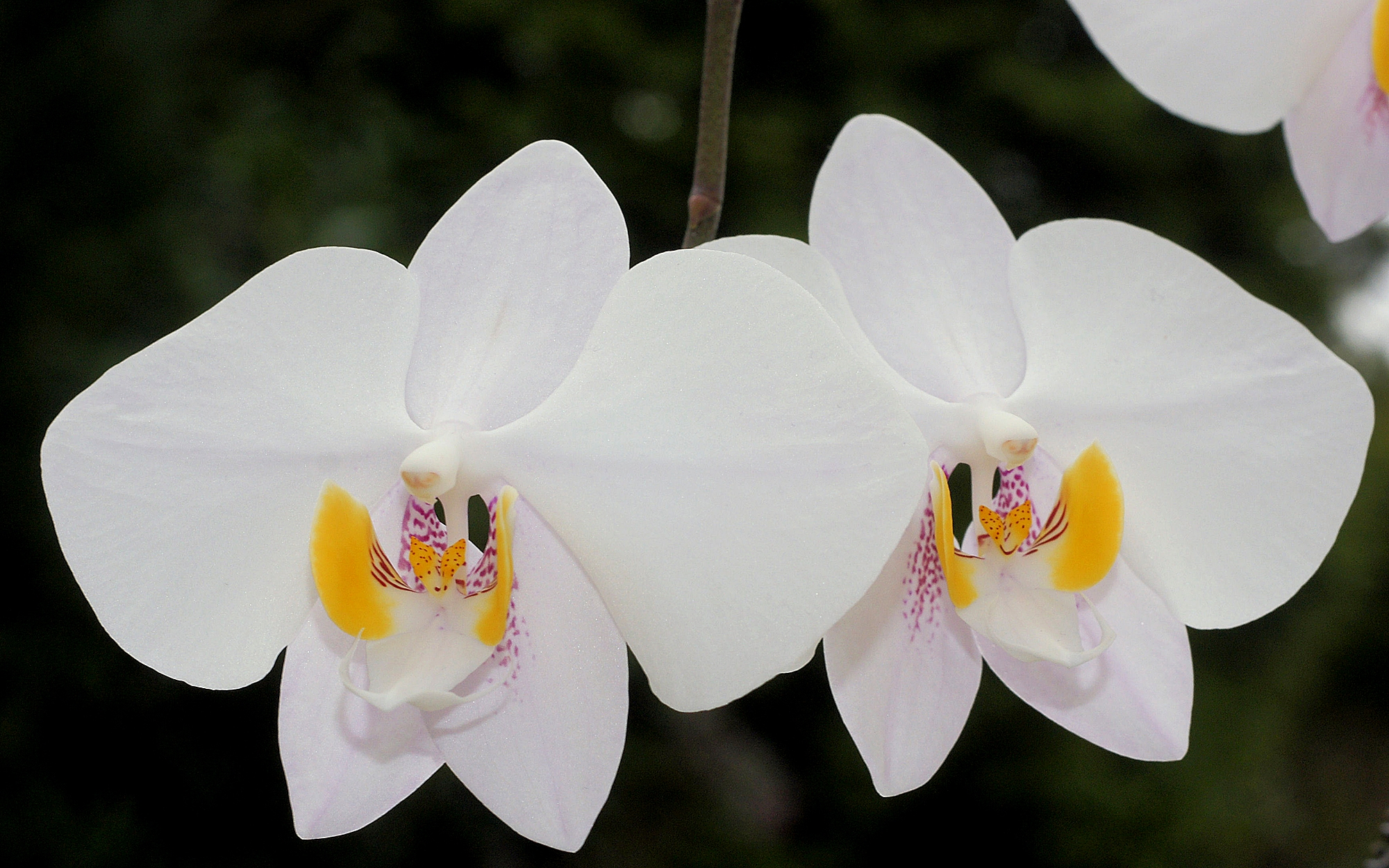
- Flowers of Phalaenopsis philippinensis

Scientific classification
- Kingdom: Plantae
- Clade: Tracheophytes
- Clade: Angiosperms
- Clade: Monocots
- Order: Asparagales
- Family: Orchidaceae
- Subfamily: Epidendroideae
- Genus: Phalaenopsis
- Species: P. philippinensis

Binomial name
- Phalaenopsis philippinensis Golamco ex Fowlie & C.Z.Tang

= Phalaenopsis philippinensis =

Species of orchid

Phalaenopsis philippinensis is an endemic species of orchid found from Luzon island in the Philippines.

== Description ==
Phalaenopsis philippinensis is a pendent epiphyte. The leaves are oblong-elliptic to oblong-oblanceolate, tapered to the base, obtuse-rounded. The upper surface is dark green overlain with silvery gray marbling, while the lower surface is dark purple. Inflorescences are described as laxly arching-pendent panicles (up to 120 cm long) with floral bracts that are minute and triangular (up to 8mm long). Flowers are delicate and membranous. Mature plants can have more than 100 flowers. The petals are white with pale pink suffusion. The lateral sepals have dark red spots at the base. The white lip is accompanied by dark yellow lateral lobes with dark red stripes at the base.

The dorsal sepal is elliptic to elliptic-ovate and obtuse-rounded. The lateral sepals are obliquely ovate, sub-acute and divergent. Petals are rhomboid, cuneate-clawed, obtuse and broadly rounded. The lip is three-lobed. The lateral lobes are elliptic-obovate, obtuse-rounded and erect-incurved forming a cylinder. The mid-lobe is oblong-ovate with the base hastate to subauriculate. The apex is notched with the lanceolate lobules elongate and recurved. The callus is uniseriate, peltate, channeled with the posterior edge extended in a pair of wing-like teeth.

This showy species has only recently been described. When first published (Golamco 1984), the name was invalid because no Latin diagnosis or description accompanied the English description and the binomial combination was not explicitly cited. These oversights were corrected by Fowlie and Tang. When P. philippinensis was first discovered and brought into cultivation, it was confused with the similar P. x leucorrhoda. The richly marked leaves and the pure yellow lateral lobes of the lip have made it a very desirable species.

Like the closely related P. schilleriana and P. stuartiana, P. philippinensis tends to open all the flowers on an inflorescence quickly. Having all flowers open at once makes it a particularly excellent display plant. This quality of producing a massive display of flowers is dominant in its hybrids.

== Habitat ==
An epiphytic shade plant, Phalaenopsis philippinensis is found in the wilderness in the dampness of the lower portions of the forest, protected from direct sunlight by the thick forest canopy. It grows on tree trunks with abundant moss from which its roots extract nutrients.

== Range ==
It is endemic to the Sierra Madre forest in Northeastern Luzon.
