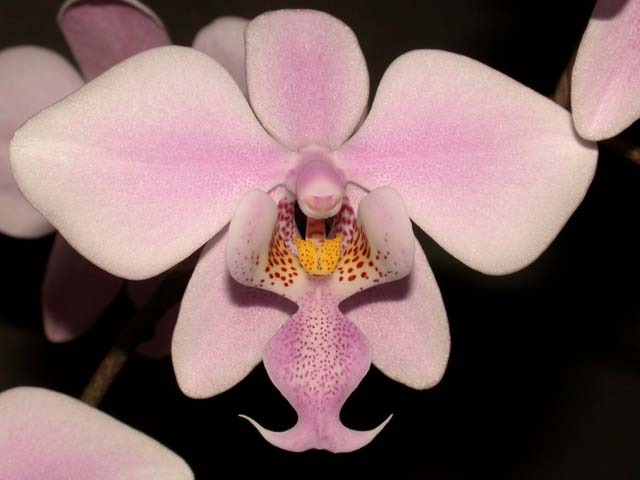

Scientific classification
- Kingdom: Plantae
- Clade: Tracheophytes
- Clade: Angiosperms
- Clade: Monocots
- Order: Asparagales
- Family: Orchidaceae
- Subfamily: Epidendroideae
- Genus: Phalaenopsis
- Species: P. schilleriana

Binomial name
- Phalaenopsis schilleriana Rchb.f.

Synonyms
- Phalaenopsis schilleriana var. immaculata Rchb.f.; Phalaenopsis schilleriana var. splendens R.Warner; Phalaenopsis schilleriana var. purpurea O'Brien; Phalaenopsis schilleriana var. pallida Valmayor & D.Tiu; Phalaenopsis schilleriana f. immaculata (Rchb.f.) Christenson

= Phalaenopsis schilleriana =

Species of orchid

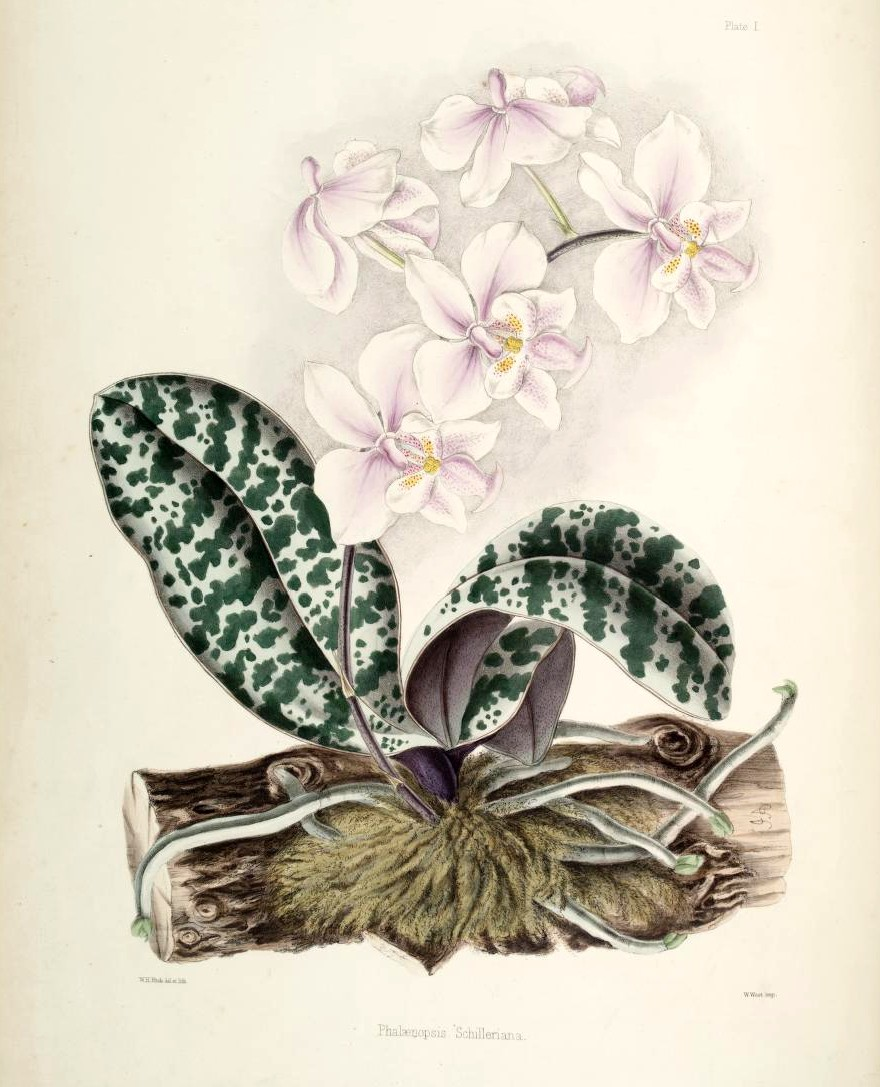
Phalaenopsis schilleriana Select Orchidaceous Plants

Phalaenopsis schilleriana is a plant of the orchid genus Phalaenopsis and an endemic species to Philippines. It is commonly cultivated as a decorative houseplant. It is an epiphytic herb with long, thick roots; mottled, fleshy leaves; and large, pink flowers. Mature plants can produce more than 100 flowers per raceme.

.

== Use in horticulture ==
Phalaenopsis schilleriana is reportedly among the easiest species orchids to grow as a houseplant, it is usually about as tolerant as more widely available hybrid phalaenopsis orchids. It thrives in a domestic temperature range of 17–22 °C (63–72 °F), in bright indirect light such as that offered by an east- or west-facing window, although is reportedly tolerant of higher light than most phalaenopsis. Specialized fir bark, long fiber sphagnum moss, or coconut husk-based orchid potting mixes, pots, and fertilizers are widely available.
