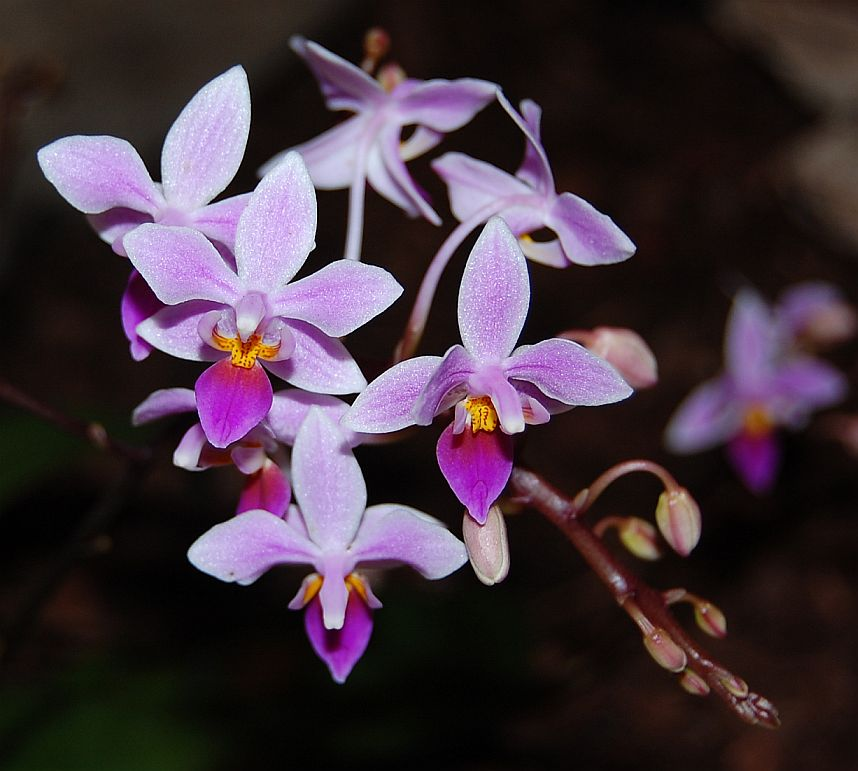

Scientific classification
- Kingdom: Plantae
- Clade: Tracheophytes
- Clade: Angiosperms
- Clade: Monocots
- Order: Asparagales
- Family: Orchidaceae
- Subfamily: Epidendroideae
- Genus: Phalaenopsis
- Species: P. equestris

Binomial name
- Phalaenopsis equestris (Schauer) Rchb.f

Synonyms
- Stauroglottis equestris Schauer (basionym); Phalaenopsis rosea Lindl.; Phalaenopsis riteiwanensis Masam.; Phalaenopsis equestris var. rosea Valmayor & D.Tiu, 1983; Phalaenopsis equestris f. aurea Christenson, 2001; Phalaenopsis equestris f. cyanochila O.Gruss, 2001

= Phalaenopsis equestris =

Species of orchid

Phalaenopsis equestris is a flowering plant of the orchid genus Phalaenopsis and native to Philippines and Taiwan. The inflorescence has 10 to 20 flowers of about 25 mm (1 in) diameter.

Phaleonopsis equestris plays an important role in the development of novelty species and it is frequently used to cross with other hybrids. It has become an important commodity in the international floral trade.

This species is highly variable in morphology as well in the color of its flowers. The following forms occur :

- Phalaenopsis equestris var. alba — a pure white form; lacking yellow pigments on the callus.
- Phalaenopsis equestris var. aurea — white flowers with a solid yellow lip.
- Phalaenopsis equestris var. rosea— flowers with even red petals and sepals; color of the mid-lobe of the lip varies from deep red to light red.
- Phalaenopsis equestris var. leucaspis — small flowers with white edges on pink petals and sepals; mid-lobe of the lip is purple or orange in color with white or yellow callus.

The different colors on the lip are obtained through a different expression of both anthocyanins and carotenoids.

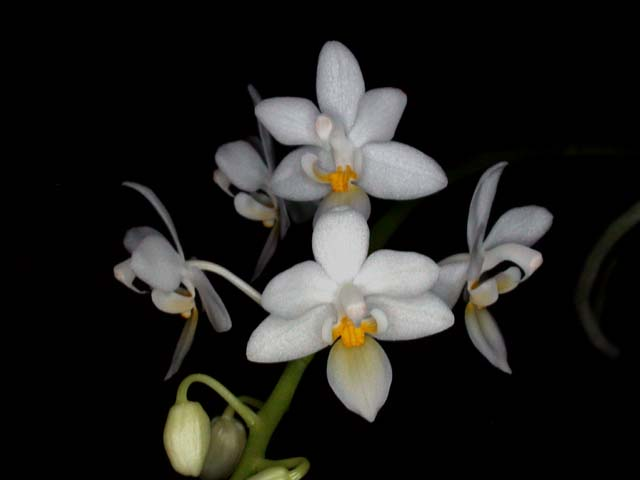
Phalaenopsis equestris var. aurea

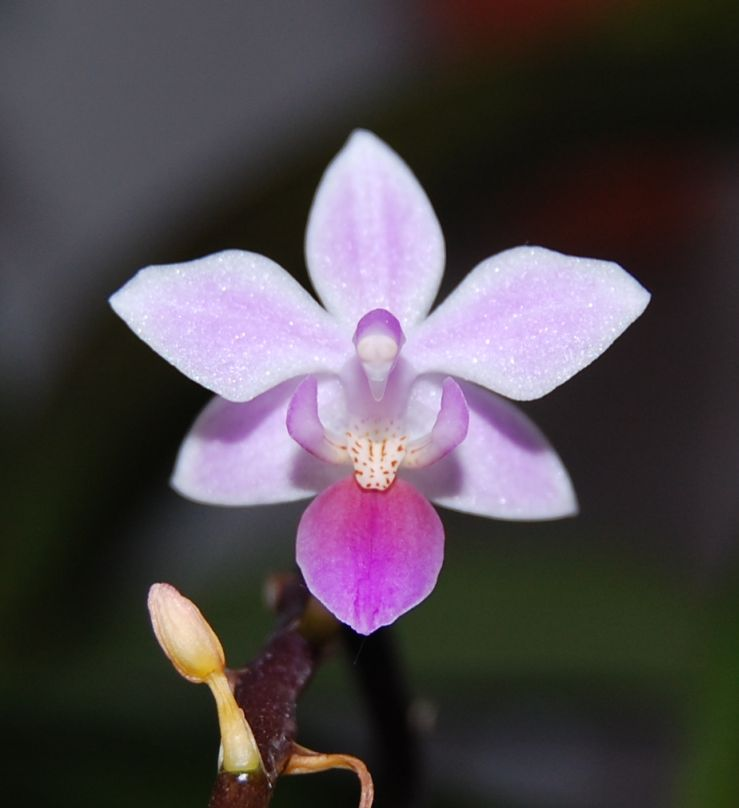
Phalaenopsis equestris var. leucaspis
