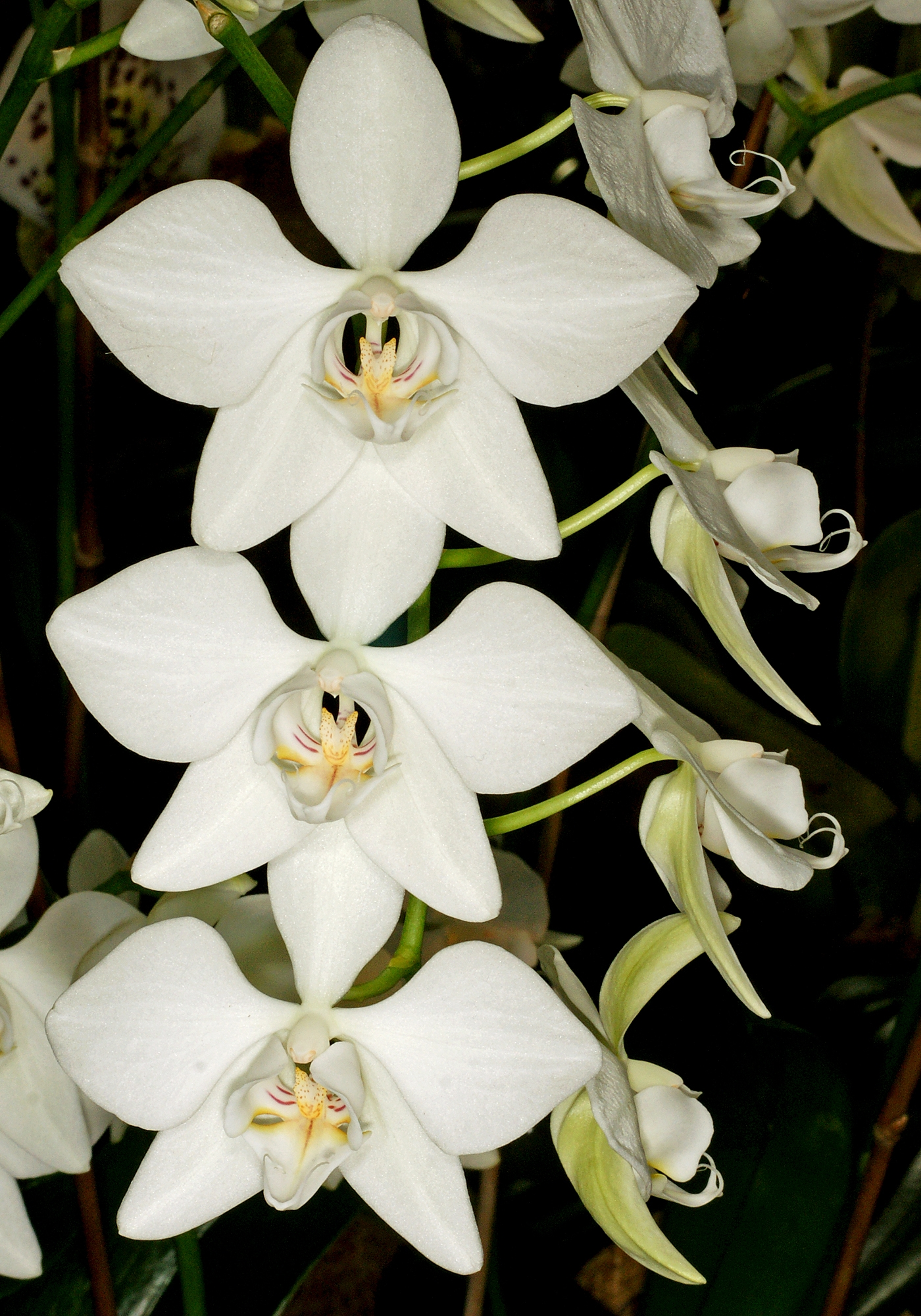
- Inflorescence of Phalaenopsis aphrodite

Conservation status
- CITES Appendix II

Scientific classification
- Kingdom: Plantae
- Clade: Tracheophytes
- Clade: Angiosperms
- Clade: Monocots
- Order: Asparagales
- Family: Orchidaceae
- Subfamily: Epidendroideae
- Genus: Phalaenopsis
- Species: P. aphrodite

Binomial name
- Phalaenopsis aphrodite Rchb.f.

Subspecies
- Phalaenopsis aphrodite subsp. aphrodite; Phalaenopsis aphrodite subsp. formosana Christenson
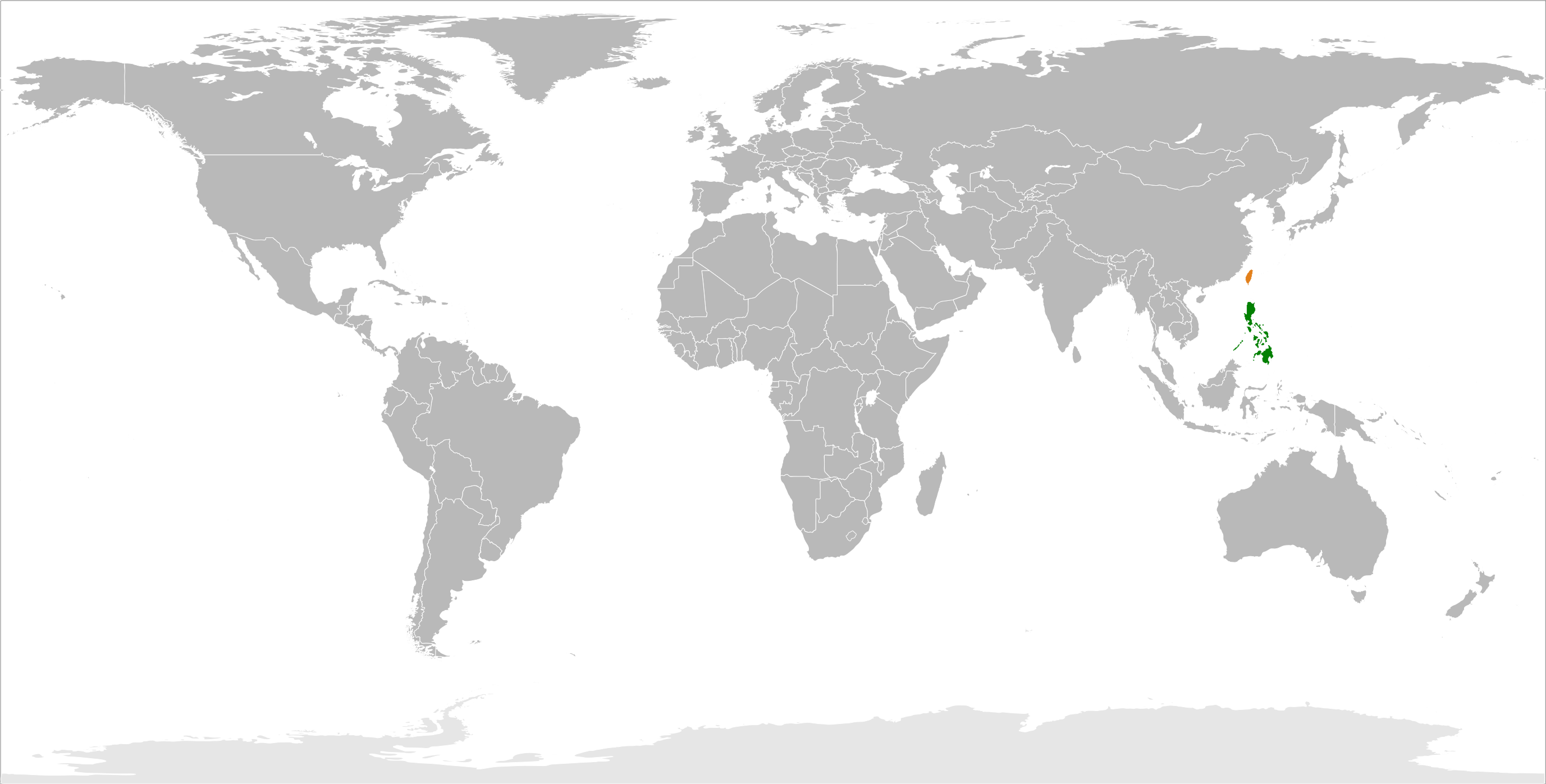
- Distribution of Phalaenopsis aphrodite

Synonyms
- Synonyms of Phalaenopsis aphrodite subsp. aphrodite: Phalaenopsis amabilis Lindl.; Phalaenopsis ambigua Rchb.f.; Phalaenopsis erubescens Burb.; Synonyms of Phalaenopsis aphrodite subsp. formosana: Phalaenopsis babuyana Miwa; Phalaenopsis formosana Miwa

= Phalaenopsis aphrodite =

Species of orchid

Phalaenopsis aphrodite is a species of orchid found from southeastern Taiwan to the Philippines.

== Subspecies ==
- Phalaenopsis aphrodite subsp. aphrodite (the Philippines)
- Phalaenopsis aphrodite subsp. formosana Christenson (Southeastern Taiwan)
