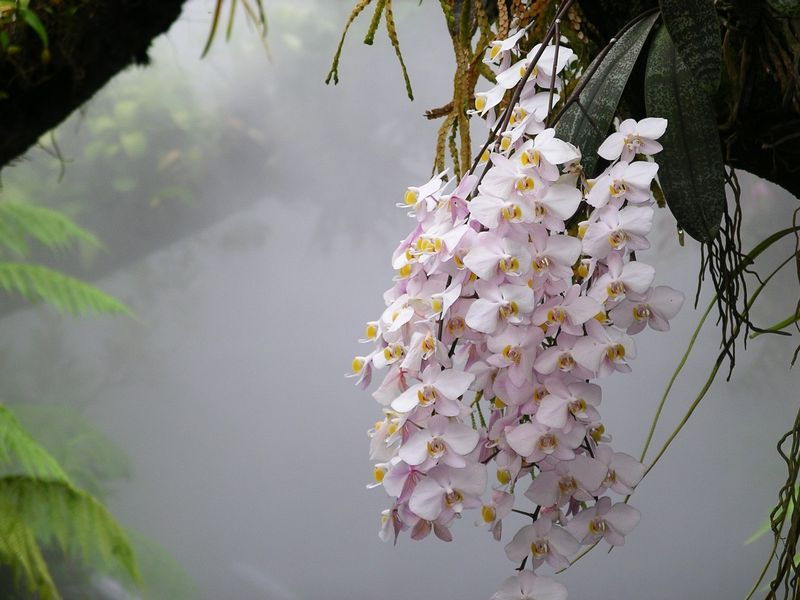
- Phalaenopsis philippinensis

Scientific classification
- Kingdom: Plantae
- Clade: Tracheophytes
- Clade: Angiosperms
- Clade: Monocots
- Order: Asparagales
- Family: Orchidaceae
- Subfamily: Epidendroideae
- Tribe: Vandeae
- Subtribe: Aeridinae
- Genus: Phalaenopsis; Blume

Type species
- Phalaenopsis amabilis Blume (1825)

Species
- About 70; see List of Phalaenopsis species

Synonyms
- List: Doritis Lindl.; Grafia A.D.Hawkes nom. illeg. homonym. post.; Grussia M.Wolff; Hygrochilus Pfitzer; Kingidium P.F.Hunt; Kingiella Rolfe nom. illeg. homonym. post.; Lesliea Seidenf.; Nothodoritis Z.H.Tsi; Ornithochilus (Lindl.) Wall. ex Benth.; Polychilos Breda; Polystylus Hasselt ex Hassk.; Sedirea Garay & H.R.Sweet; Stauritis Rchb.f.; Stauroglottis Schauer; Synadena Raf.

= Phalaenopsis =

Genus of orchids

Phalaenopsis (/ˌfælɪˈnɒpsɪs/), also known as moth orchids, is a genus of about seventy species of plants in the family Orchidaceae. Orchids in this genus are monopodial epiphytes or lithophytes with long, coarse roots, short, leafy stems and long-lasting, flat flowers arranged in a flowering stem that often branches near the end. Orchids in this genus are native to Asia, New Guinea, and Australia, but mostly occur in Indonesia and the Philippines.

== Description ==
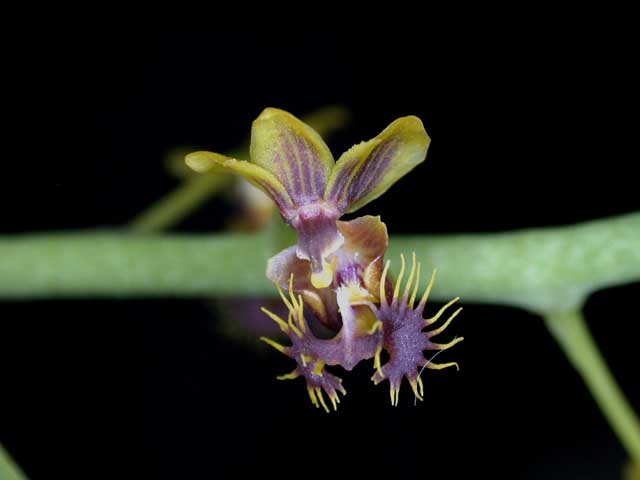
Phalaenopsis difformis of Phalaenopsis subg. Ornithochilus

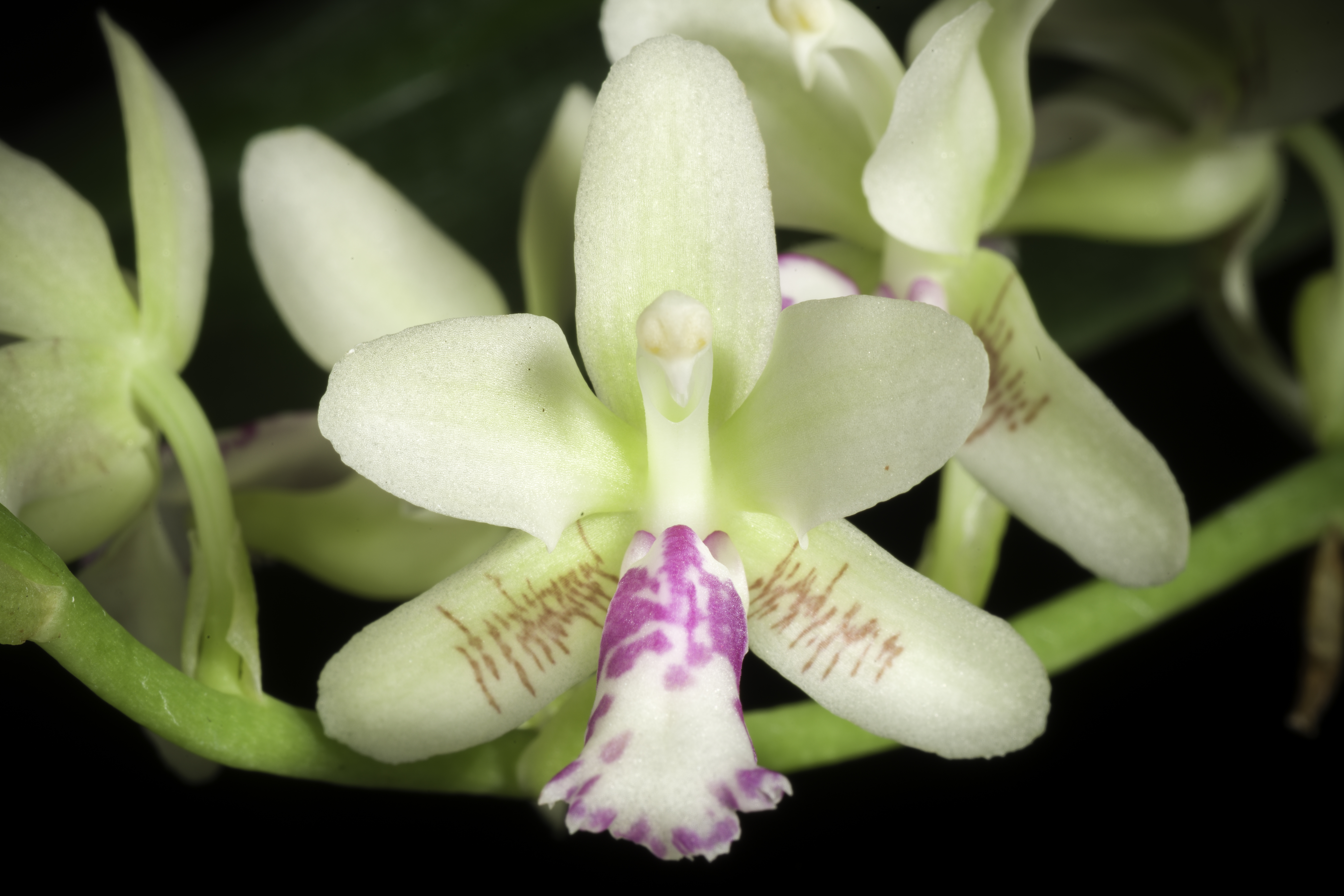
Phalaenopsis japonica of Phalaenopsis subg. Hygrochilus

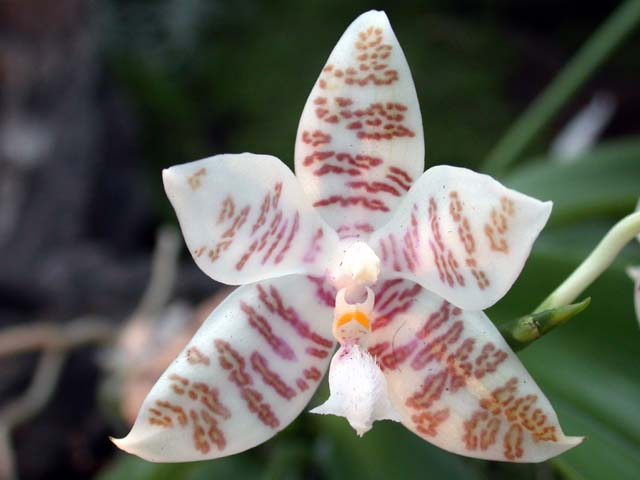
Phalaenopsis hieroglyphica of Phalaenopsis sect. Polychilos

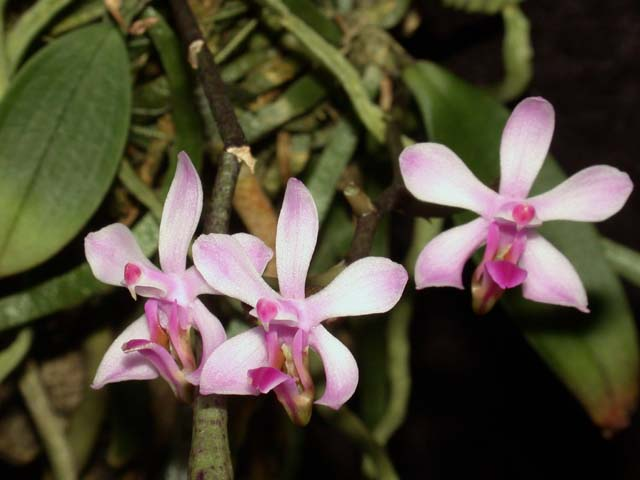
Phalaenopsis taenialis of Phalaenopsis sect. Aphyllae

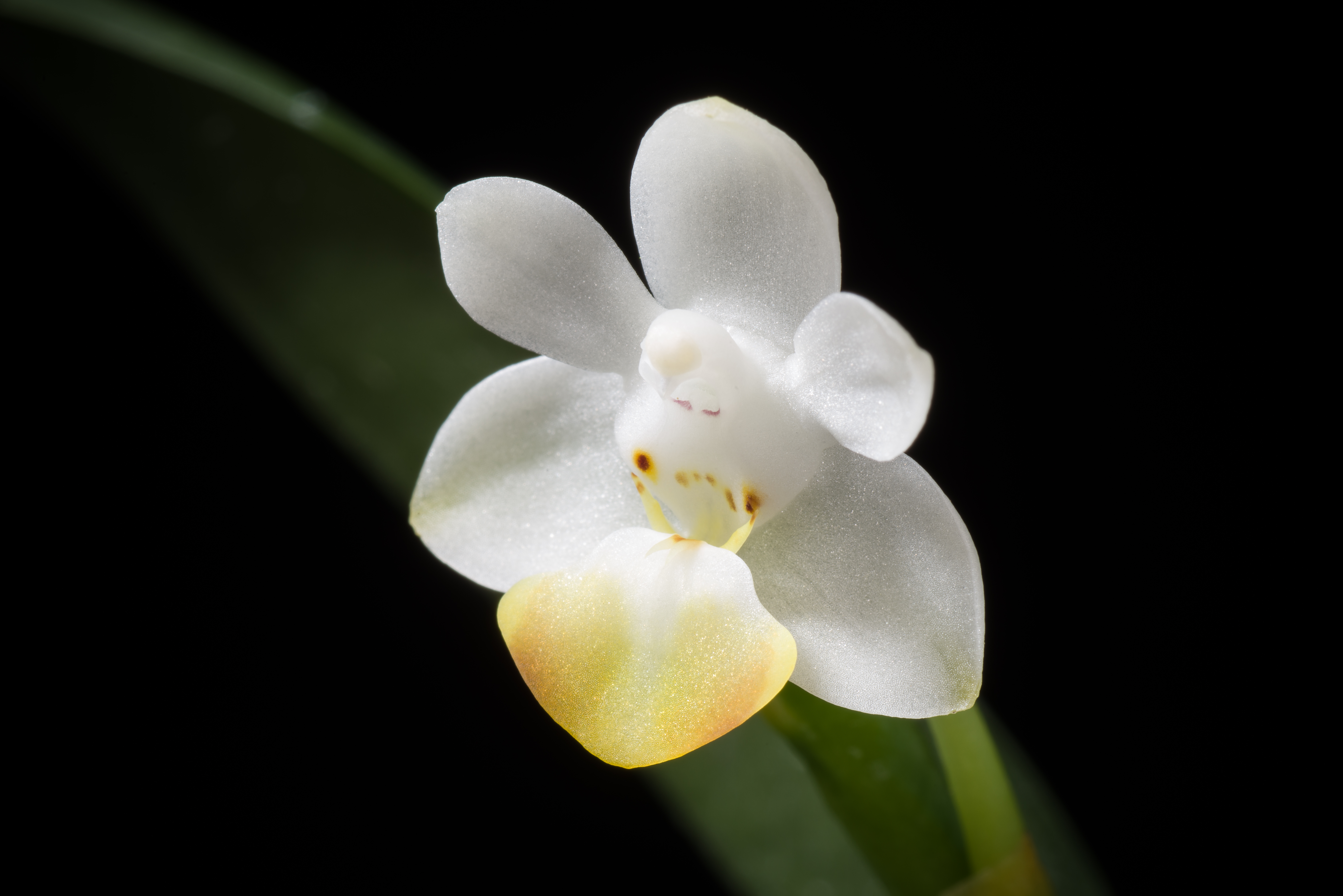
Phalaenopsis lobbii of Phalaenopsis sect. Parishianae

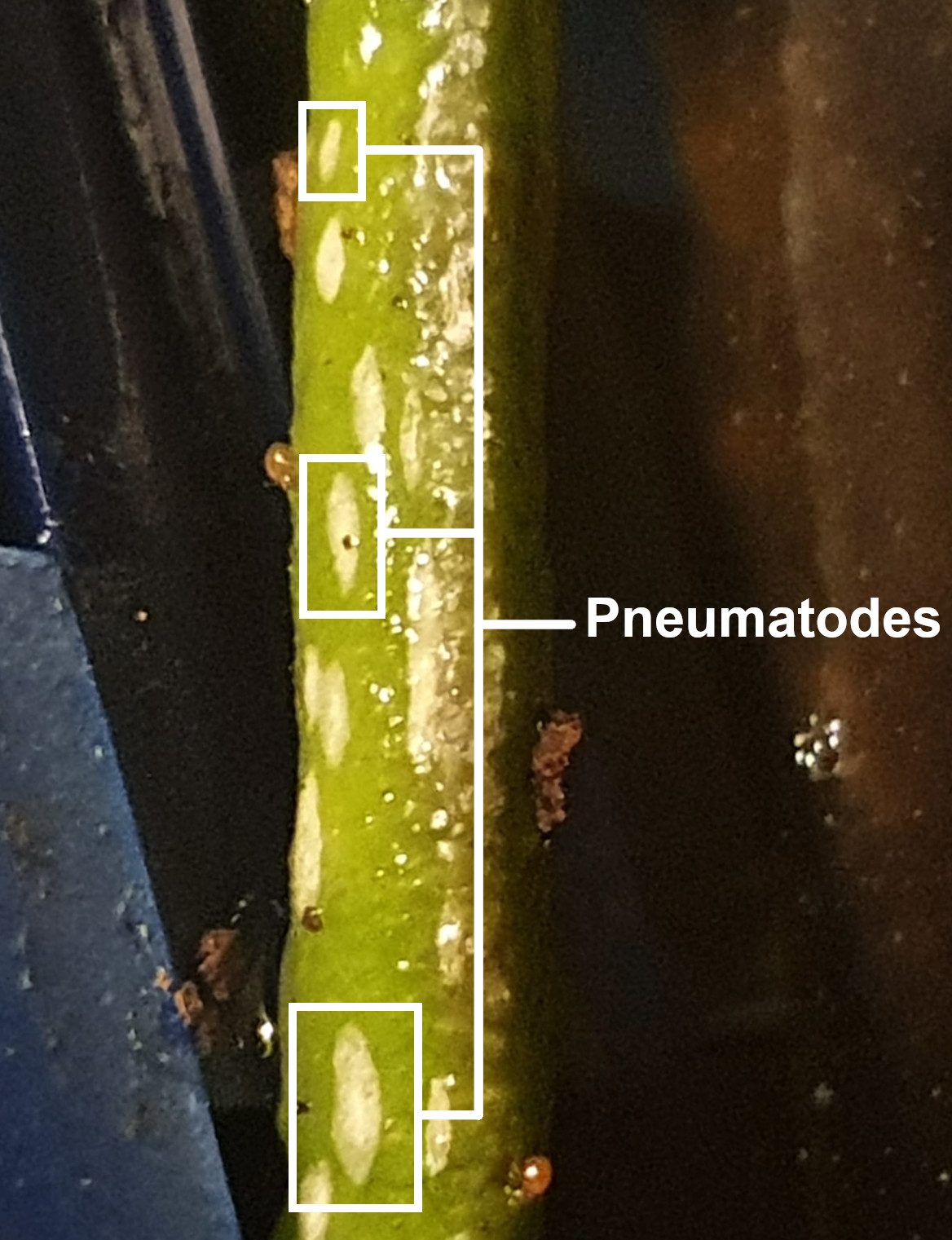
Pneumatodes in roots of Phalaenopsis philippinensis

Orchids in the genus Phalaenopsis are monopodial epiphytic, sometimes lithophytic herbs with long, coarse roots with pneumatodes (which allow for gaseous exchange of the photosynthetic roots), and short leafy stems hidden by overlapping leaf bases. The leaves are usually arranged in two rows, relatively large and leathery, oblong to elliptic and sometimes succulent. A few to many, small to large, long-lasting, flat, often fragrant flowers are arranged on erect to hanging racemes or panicles. The sepals and petals are free from and spread widely apart from each other. The lateral sepals are usually larger than the dorsal sepal and the petals much wider than the sepals. The labellum is joined stiffly to the column and has three lobes. The side lobes are erect and more or less parallel to each other and the middle lobe sometimes has a pair of appendages or antennae.

=== Reproduction ===
Unlike most other angiosperms, the development of the ovules is triggered by pollination. Therefore a temporal mismatch of male and female gametes exists (i.e. the male structures are ready but the female structures have not yet been fully developed). In orchids, fertilisation occurs within days or months after the pollination event. After pollination occurs, the stigmatic cavity is often closed through swelling of the column. As a result, the pollinia are completely enclosed. The pollen germinates after enclosure and tubes are produced. In Phalaenopsis aphrodite, pollen tubes entered the ovary within 3 days after pollination. Within 15 days, pollen tubes evenly spread throughout the placental cavities. Within 60 days after the pollination event, 30.6% of the tips of the pollen tubes started to enter the micropyles (i.e. entry points) of the ovules. Finally, 65 to 70 days after the pollination event, fertilisation occurred.

Phalaenopsis are unique in that in some species of the subgenus Polychilos, the flowers turn into green leaves after pollination. As in many other plants, the petals of the orchid flowers serve to attract pollinating insects and protect essential organs. Following pollination, petals usually will undergo senescence (i.e. wilt and disintegrate) because it is metabolically expensive to maintain them. However, in many Phalaenopsis species, such as P. violacea, the petals and sepals find new uses following pollination, thus escaping programmed cell death. In producing chloroplasts, they turn green, become fleshy, and start to photosynthesize, as leaves do.

=== Phytochemistry ===
Floral fragrance has been analysed for several species. The fragrance of Phalaenopsis bellina has been shown to be composed of about 79 compounds, primarily of the terpenoid class. It was most intense in the morning.

In Phalaenopsis, phenylpropanoid enzymes are enhanced in the process of plant acclimatisation at different levels of photosynthetic photon flux.

== Taxonomy ==
The genus Phalaenopsis was first formally described in 1825 by Carl Ludwig Blume and the description was published in Bijdragen tot de flora van Nederlandsch Indië. The name Phalaenopsis is derived from the Ancient Greek word φαλαινα (phalaina) meaning 'a kind of moth' with the suffix -opsis meaning 'having the appearance of' or 'like'.

The genus name is abbreviated Phal. horticulturally.

=== Infrageneric structure ===
The large monophyletic genus Phalaenopsis is divided into several sub-units. They are either regarded as subgenera or as sections. Not all of them are monophyletic. The subgenus Polychilos is monophyletic and it is divided into two subclades. The subgenus Phalaenopsis is paraphyletic under its current definition. Likewise the evidence shows that the subgenera Aphyllae and Parishianae, as currently defined, are not monophyletic. The position of the monotypic subgenus Proboscidioides, which only consists of Phalaenopsis lowii, suggests a close relationship with the subgenus Aphyllae.

The following phylogenetic tree is a simplified tree to show the general placement of the main infrageneric groups. It is meant to give an overview, despite the contended monophyly of some of the respective groups.

- Phalaenopsis
  - - - subgen. Phalaenopsis
        - Polychilos
        - Phalaenopsis
      - subgen. Parishianae
        - Aphyllae
        - Parishianae
    - - subg. Hygrochilus
      - subg. Ornithochilus

=== Ornithochilus ===
The former genus Ornithochilus was merged with Phalaenopsis and is considered by some to be a subgenus. Its members have distinctly 4-lobed, fringed labella with a short, curved spur situated near the middle of the lip as opposed to the base. Ornithochilus formerly had three known species, native to China, the Himalayas and Southeast Asia:

- Ornithochilus cacharensis Barbhuiya, B.K.Dutta & Schuit. - Assam
- Ornithochilus difformis (Wall. ex Lindl.) Schltr. - Guangdong, Guangxi, Sichuan, Yunnan, Assam, India, Bhutan, Nepal, Myanmar, Thailand, Vietnam, Laos, Borneo, Sumatra, Peninsular Malaysia
- Ornithochilus yingjiangensis Z.H.Tsi - Yunnan

=== Hygrochilus ===
The former genera Sedirea and Hygrochilus were incorporated into Phalaenopsis subgen. Hygrochilus. The interspecific relationships within the subgenus Hygrochilus are poorly understood and are a source of confusion. The type species of the subgenus is Phalaenopsis hygrochila. The species of this subgenus are morphologically distinct from the other subgenera, due to their four pollinia and spurred flowers, as well as their unusually long stems.

=== Species list ===
See List of Phalaenopsis species

=== Intergeneric hybrids ===
See List of Phalaenopsis species

== Distribution ==
Species of Phalaenopsis are found from India to southern China, Indochina, Malaysia and from Indonesia to the Philippines and New Guinea. There is a single species, Phalaenopsis rosenstromii, endemic to Queensland, Australia. Phalaenopsis stuartiana has become naturalised in Costa Rica, Panama, and Suriname.

== Ecology ==
Pollination of Phalaenopsis pulcherrima through bees, specifically Amegilla nigritar, has been recorded in China. This species employs a deceptive pollination strategy. The orchid does not provide rewards to pollinators. It benefits from blooming in the same period as rewarding species. Amegilla is the most important pollinator, but diurnal insects – such as four species of bees, two species of butterflies, one species of moth and two other unidentified insects – have also been observed to interact with the flowers.

== Conservation ==
Many species are highly threatened. For instance Phalaenopsis lindenii is categorized as endangered, Phalaenopsis violacea is categorized as vulnerable and Phalaenopsis micholitzii is categorized as critically endangered. Some species, like P. javanica, are believed to be extinct in the wild.

== Use in horticulture ==
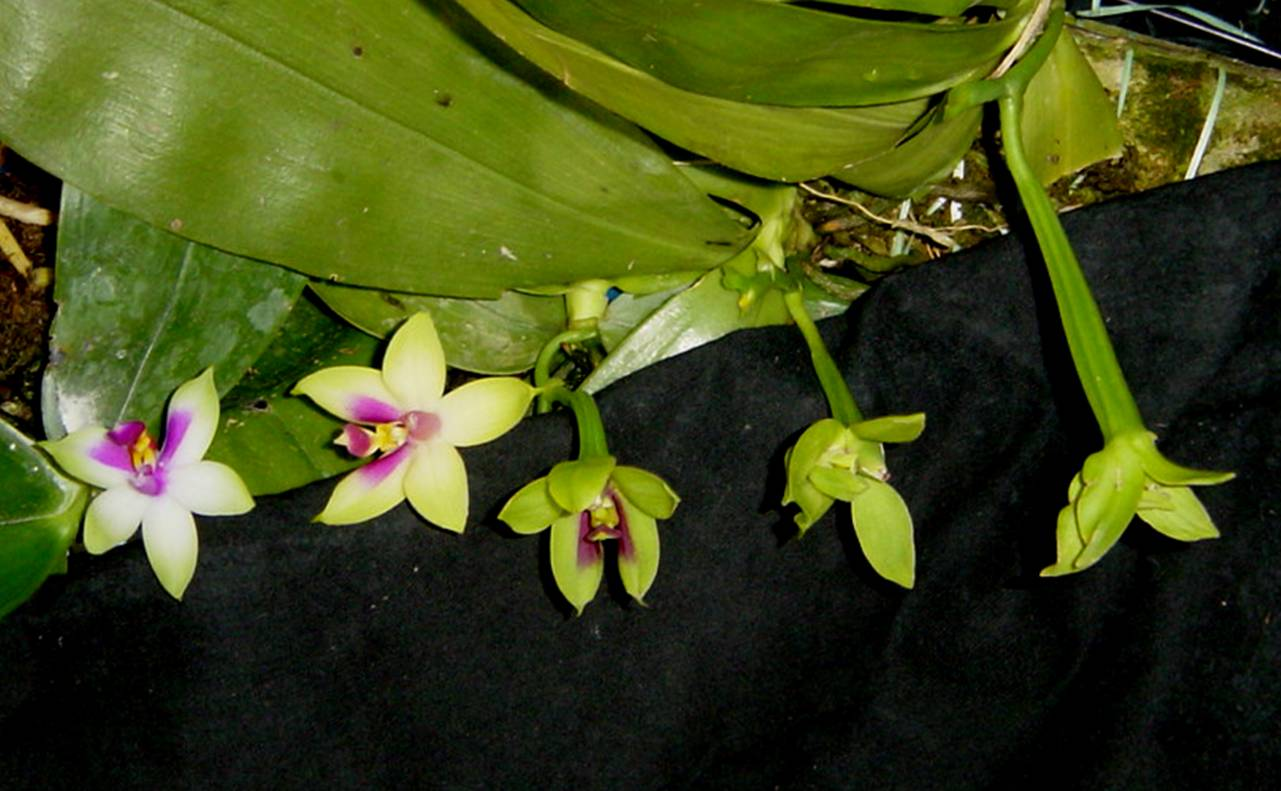
Phalaenopsis bellina exhibiting typical post-pollination changes of the subgenus Polychilos, in which petals and sepals become photosynthetic

Phalaenopsis, abbreviated Phal in the horticultural trade, are among the most popular orchids sold as potted plants, owing to the ease of propagation and flowering under artificial conditions. They were among the first tropical orchids in Victorian collections. Since the advent of the tetraploid hybrid Phalaenopsis Doris, they have become extremely easy to grow and flower in the home, as long as some care is taken to provide them with conditions that approximate their native habitats. Their commercial production has become an industry.

If very healthy, a Phalaenopsis plant may have up to ten or more leaves. They bloom in their full glory for several weeks. If kept in the home, the flowers may last two to three months after which a Phalaenopsis orchid will need to conserve energy for further leaf, bud, and root development.

In nature, Phalaenopsis species are typically fond of warm temperatures, thriving in temperatures around 20 to 35 °C (68–95 °F), but are adaptable to conditions more comfortable for human habitation in temperate zones (15 to 30 °C or 59–86 °F); at temperatures below 18 °C (64.4 °F) overwatering causes root rot and the plants will also drop their leaves if they experience temperatures below 60 °F for extended periods. Phalaenopsis prefer moderate humidity (60–70%) and low light of 12,000 to 20,000 lux. However, Phalaenopsis orchids can adapt to the lower humidity found in most homes. They are also typically hardier than other species of orchids, and this makes them particularly popular among first-time orchid growers.

The flower spikes appear from the pockets near the base of each leaf. The first sign is a light green "mitten-like" object that protrudes from the basal leaf tissue. Over approximately three months the spike elongates until it begins to swell fat buds that will bloom.

It previously was believed that flowering is triggered by a night-time drop in temperature of around 5 to 6 degrees over two to four consecutive weeks, usually in the fall, and a day-time drop in temperature to below 29 °C (84 °F). Using two Phalaenopsis clones, Matthew G. Blanchard and Erik S. Runkle (2006) established that, other culture conditions being optimal, flower initiation is controlled by daytime temperatures declining below 27 °C (81 °F), with a definite inhibition of flowering at temperatures exceeding 29 °C (84 °F). The long-held belief that reduced evening temperatures control flower initiation in Phalaenopsis was shown to be false. Rather, lower daytime temperatures influence flowering, while night time temperatures do not appear to have any effect.

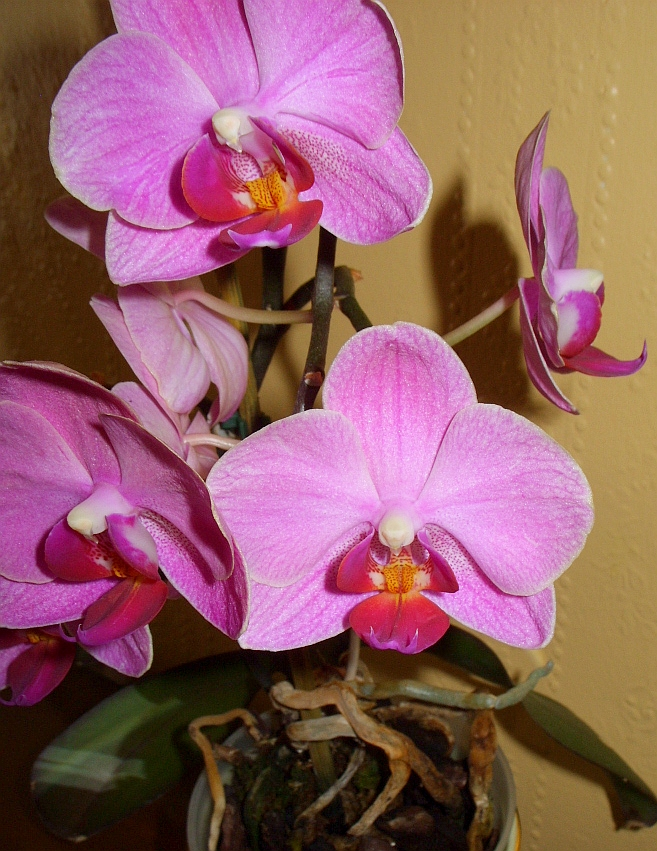
Pink cultivar

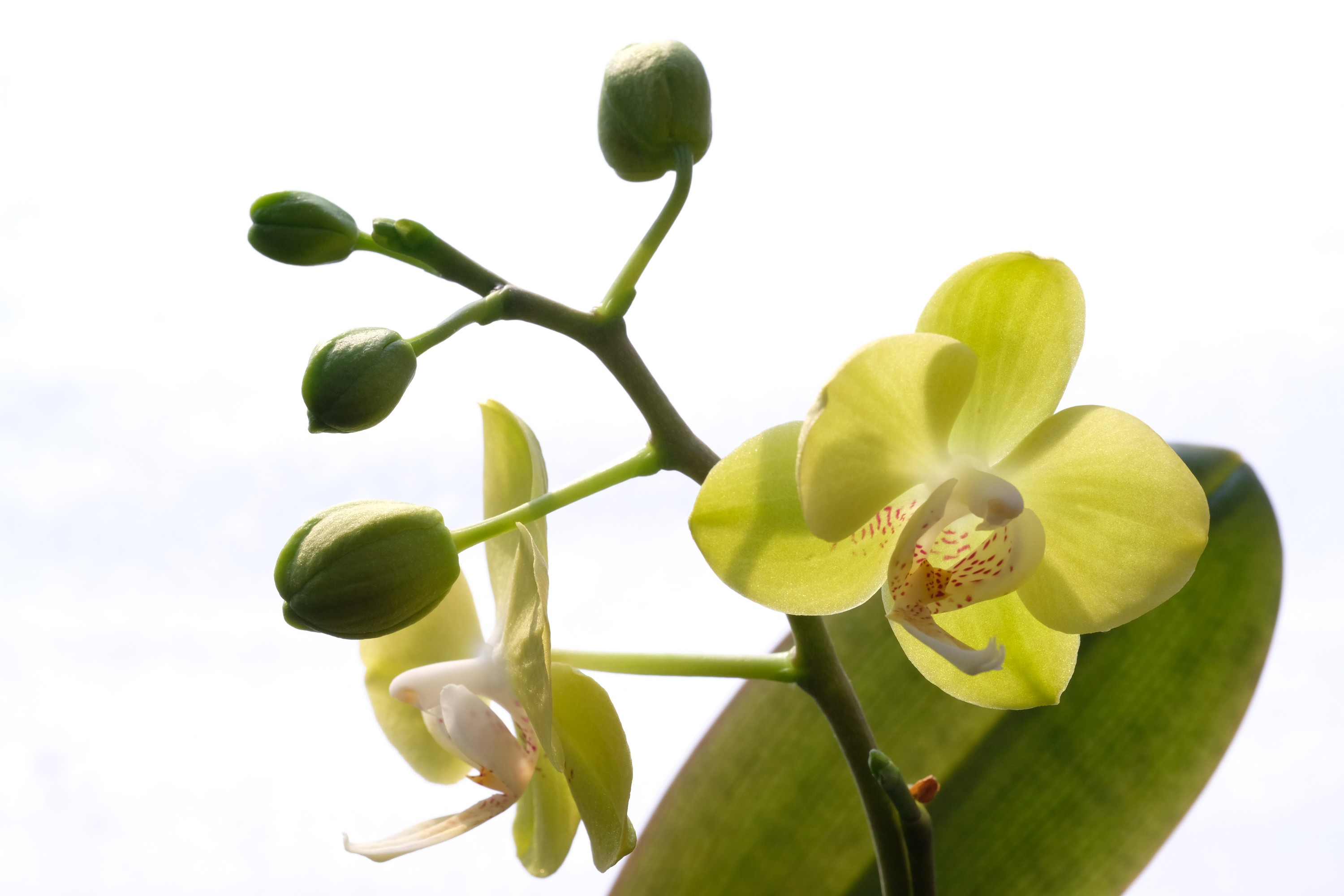
Greenish-yellow cultivar

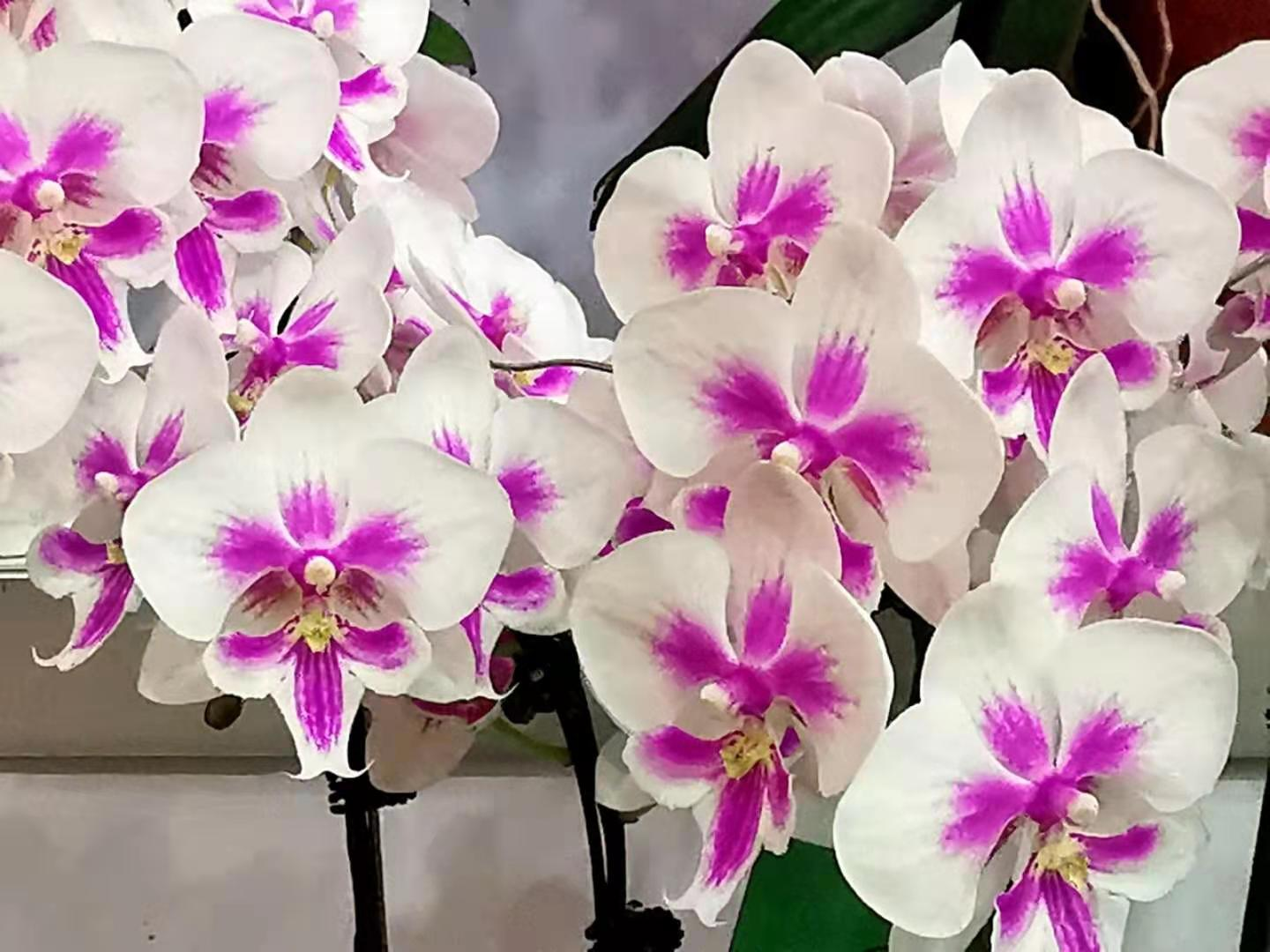
Unknown "big lip" cultivar

=== Award of Garden Merit ===
In cultivation in the United Kingdom, the following have been awarded the Royal Horticultural Society's Award of Garden Merit:

- Brother Pico Sweetheart gx.
- Phalaenopsis amabilis
- Yellow Lightning gx.
