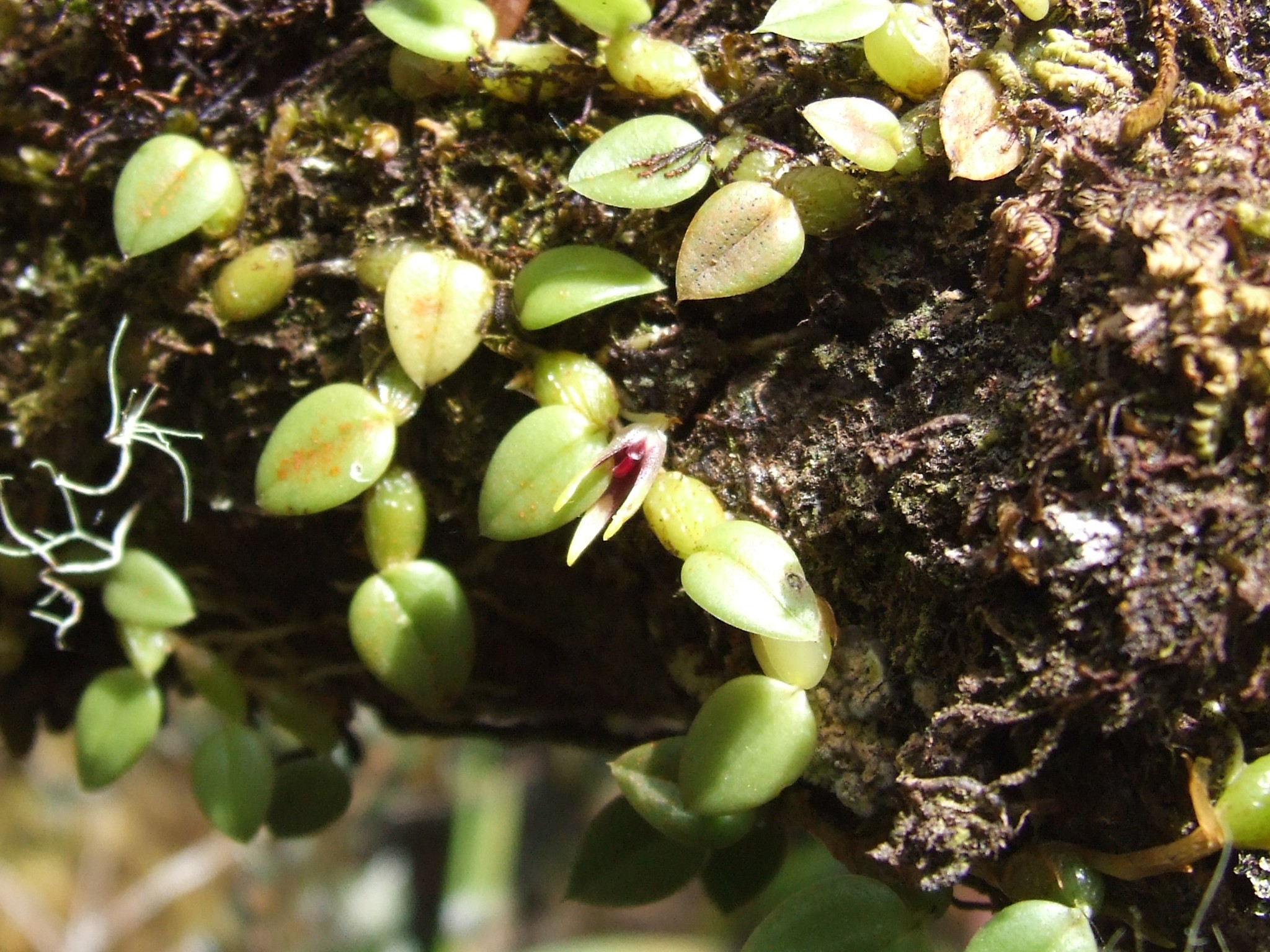
- Bulbophyllum depressum

Scientific classification
- Kingdom: Plantae
- Clade: Tracheophytes
- Clade: Angiosperms
- Clade: Monocots
- Order: Asparagales
- Family: Orchidaceae
- Subfamily: Epidendroideae
- Genus: Bulbophyllum
- Section: Bulbophyllum sect. Monanthaparva; Ridl. 1896

Type species
- Bulbophyllum striatellum

Species
- See text

Synonyms
- Bulbophyllum sect. Scyphosepalum Schltr.1913

= Bulbophyllum sect. Monanthaparva =

Section of flowering plants

Bulbophyllum sect. Monanthaparva is a section of the genus Bulbophyllum.

== Description ==
Species in this section have a basal node above the attachment of the floral bract.

== Distribution ==
Plants from this section are found in Southeast asia.

== Species ==
Bulbophyllum section Monanthaparva comprises the following species:

Image	Name	Distribution	Elevation (m)
	Bulbophyllum acutilobum J.J.Verm. & P.O'Byrne 2008	Sulawesi	1,000 metres (3,300 ft)
	Bulbophyllum alboroseum Ames 1922	Philippines (Luzon)	2,000 metres (6,600 ft)
	Bulbophyllum ascochiloides J.J.Sm. 1927	Sumatra	1,500–1,600 metres (4,900–5,200 ft)
	Bulbophyllum bontocense Ames 1912	Philippines (Luzon)	1,650 metres (5,410 ft)
	Bulbophyllum camptochilum J.J.Verm. 1996	Borneo	900–1,100 metres (3,000–3,600 ft)
	Bulbophyllum ciliatum (Blume) Lindl. 1830	Java and Sulawesi	1,900–2,000 metres (6,200–6,600 ft)
	Bulbophyllum cavipes J.J.Verm. 1996	Sumatra	800–1,100 metres (2,600–3,600 ft)
	Bulbophyllum ciliatum (Blume) Lindl. 1830	Java and Sulawesi	1,300–2,000 metres (4,300–6,600 ft)
	Bulbophyllum clinocoryphe J.J.Verm., O'Byrne and Lamb 2015	Borneo	
	Bulbophyllum clinopus J.J.Verm. & P.O'Byrne 2008	Sulawesi	
	Bulbophyllum comberi J.J.Verm. in J.B.Comber 1990	peninsular Malaysia, Java and Borneo	750–2,000 metres (2,460–6,560 ft)
	Bulbophyllum delicatulum Schltr. 1911	Sumatra	1,400 metres (4,600 ft)
	Bulbophyllum depressum King & Pantl. 1897	India, China, Thailand, Malaysia, Borneo, Sumatra and Java	600–2,000 metres (2,000–6,600 ft)
	Bulbophyllum elmeri Ames 1912	Philippines (Luzon)	
	Bulbophyllum ecristatum J.J.Verm. & P.O'Byrne 2008	Sulawesi	1,400–1,500 metres (4,600–4,900 ft)
	Bulbophyllum exile Ames 1908	the Philippines	1,800–1,850 metres (5,910–6,070 ft)
	Bulbophyllum foraminiferum J.J.Verm. 1996	Borneo	1,200 metres (3,900 ft)
	Bulbophyllum furcatum Aver. 2003	Vietnam	1,400–1,500 metres (4,600–4,900 ft)
	Bulbophyllum furcillatum J.J.Verm. & P.O'Byrne 2003	Sumatra	
	Bulbophyllum gnomoniferum Ames 1908	Philippines	
	Bulbophyllum grudense J.J.Sm. 1905	Malaysia, Borneo and Java	1,700 metres (5,600 ft)
	Bulbophyllum halconense Ames 1907	the Philippines	1,400–2,100 metres (4,600–6,900 ft)
	Bulbophyllum hemiprionotum J.J.Verm. & A.L.Lamb 1994	Borneo	1,700–2,000 metres (5,600–6,600 ft)
	Bulbophyllum insipidum J.J.Verm. & P.O'Byrne 2008	Sulawesi	1,450 metres (4,760 ft)
	Bulbophyllum iterans J.J.Verm. & P.O'Byrne 2003	Sulawesi	1,200–2,900 metres (3,900–9,500 ft)
	Bulbophyllum languidum J.J.Sm. 1922	the Moluccas	
	Bulbophyllum lipense Ames 1923	the Philippines	1,300 metres (4,300 ft)
	Bulbophyllum lordoglossum J.J.Verm. & Lamb 1994	Borneo	700 metres (2,300 ft)
	Bulbophyllum majus (Ridl.) P.Royen 1979	New Guinea	750–2,500 metres (2,460–8,200 ft)
	Bulbophyllum marudiense Carr 1935	Sabah and Sarawak Borneo	10–1,200 metres (33–3,937 ft)
	Bulbophyllum membranaceum Teijsm. & Binn. 1855	Malaysia, Borneo, Java, Sulawesi, Sumatra, Papua and New Guinea, Solomon Islands Fiji, Samoa, Tonga and Vanuatu	0–450 metres (0–1,476 ft)
	Bulbophyllum menglunense Z.H.Tsi & Y.Z.Ma 1985	Yunnan China	800 metres (2,600 ft)
	Bulbophyllum nazrii P.O'Byrne & P.T.Ong 2018	peninsular Malaysia	360 metres (1,180 ft)
	Bulbophyllum oeneum Burkill ex Ridl. 1924	Borneo	1,700 metres (5,600 ft)
	Bulbophyllum papillatum J.J.Sm. 1910	Java and Borneo	900–1,500 metres (3,000–4,900 ft)
	Bulbophyllum papuliferum Schltr. 1911	Sumatra and Borneo	500–1,600 metres (1,600–5,200 ft)
	Bulbophyllum pleurothalloides Ames 1907	the Philippines	1,500 metres (4,900 ft)
	Bulbophyllum pterostele J J Verm, O'Byrne and Lamb 2015	Borneo	200 metres (660 ft)
	Bulbophyllum sensile Ames 1915	Philippines	1,700 metres (5,600 ft)
	Bulbophyllum striatellum Ridl. 1890	Malaysia and Borneo	
	Bulbophyllum trichorhachis J.J.Verm. & P.O'Byrne 2003	Sulawesi	1,000 metres (3,300 ft)
	Bulbophyllum truncatum J.J.Sm. 1913	Sumatra and Java	2,380 metres (7,810 ft)
	Bulbophyllum tryssum J.J.Verm. & A.L.Lamb 1994	Borneo	400–1,600 metres (1,300–5,200 ft)
