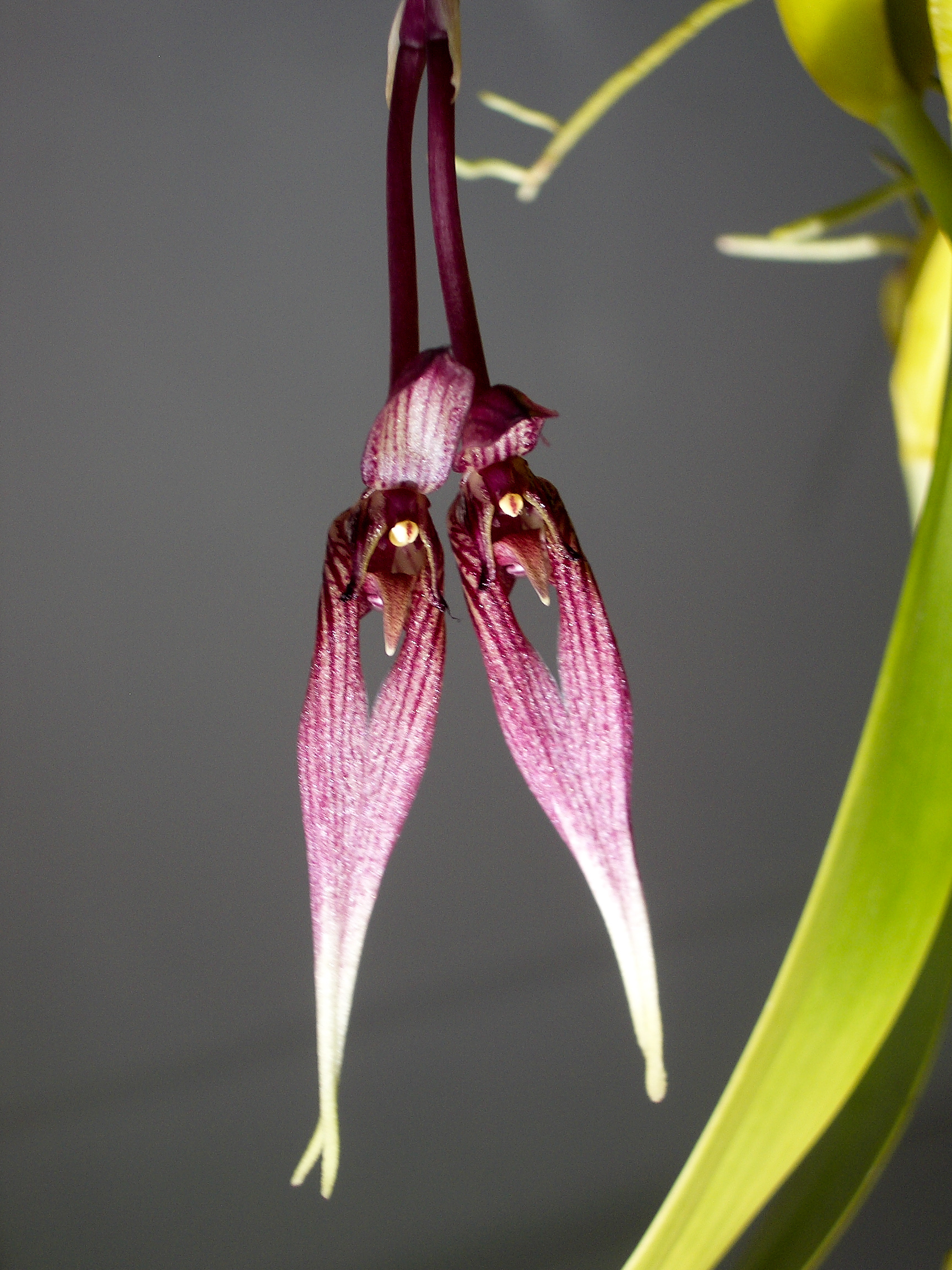
- Bulbophyllum biflorum

Scientific classification
- Kingdom: Plantae
- Clade: Tracheophytes
- Clade: Angiosperms
- Clade: Monocots
- Order: Asparagales
- Family: Orchidaceae
- Subfamily: Epidendroideae
- Genus: Bulbophyllum
- Section: Bulbophyllum sect. Biflorae; Garay, Hamer & Siegerist

Type species
- Bulbophyllum biflorum

Species
- See text

= Bulbophyllum sect. Biflorae =

Section of flowering plants

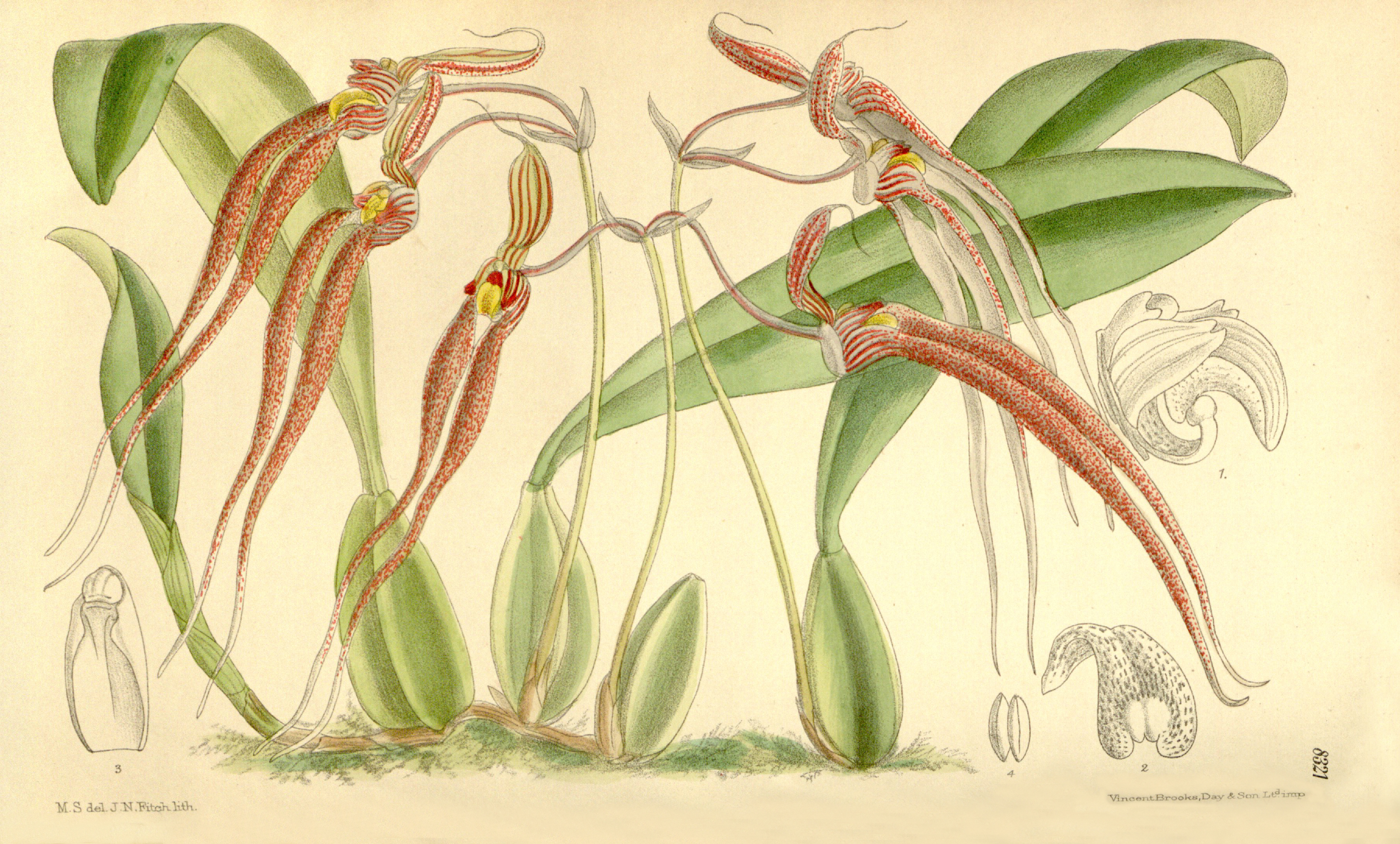
Illustration of Bulbophyllum biflorum (as syn. Cirrohopetalum biflorum)

Bulbophyllum sect. Biflorae is a section of the genus Bulbophyllum.

== Description ==
Species in this section is distinguished by its 2 flowered inflorescence.

== Distribution ==
Plants from this section are found in Southeast Asia.

== Species ==
Bulbophyllum section Biflorae comprises the following species:

Image	Name	Distribution	Elevation (m)
	Bulbophyllum biflorum Teijsm. & Binn. 1855	Java, Sumatra, Bali, Borneo, the Philippines, Thailand, Malaysian peninsula	500–1,200 metres (1,600–3,900 ft)
	Bulbophyllum hymenochilum Kraenzl.	Borneo (Sarawak )	0–800 metres (0–2,625 ft)
	Bulbophyllum puguahaanense Ames	Malayasa, Borneo and the Philippines	120 metres (390 ft)
	Bulbophyllum rhombifolium (Carr) Masam.	Malaysia and Borneo	0–300 metres (0–984 ft)
	Bulbophyllum siederi Garay	Sumatra	
