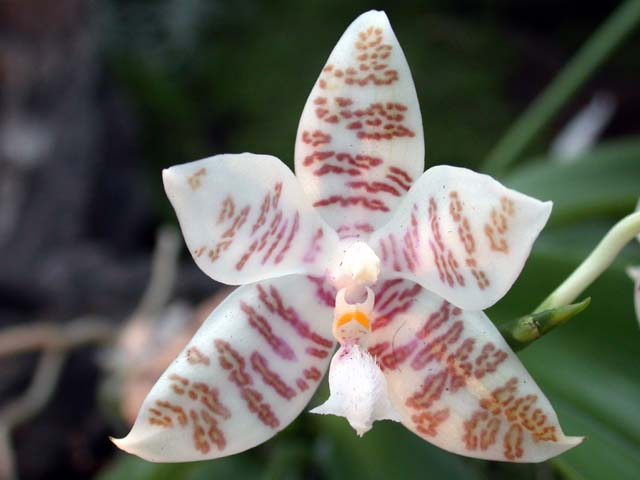

Scientific classification
- Kingdom: Plantae
- Clade: Tracheophytes
- Clade: Angiosperms
- Clade: Monocots
- Order: Asparagales
- Family: Orchidaceae
- Subfamily: Epidendroideae
- Genus: Phalaenopsis
- Species: P. hieroglyphica

Binomial name
- Phalaenopsis hieroglyphica (Rchb.f.) H.R.Sweet

Synonyms
- Phalaenopsis lueddemanniana var. hieroglyphica Rchb.f. (basionym); Polychilos hieroglyphica (Rchb.f.) Shim

= Phalaenopsis hieroglyphica =

Species of orchid

The ornamental orchid species Phalaenopsis hieroglyphica (/ˌfælɪˈnɒpsɪs haɪroʊˈɡlɪfɪkə/ fal-i-NOP-sis hy-roh-GLIF-ik-ə (Note: "Phalaenopsis". Oxford Dictionaries UK English Dictionary. Oxford University Press.)) is native to certain islands of the Philippines. Its flowers are creamy white with transverse markings that resemble glyphs. Through hybridization, growers have successfully created flowers with different shapes and colors while retaining the glyphs. Since 1975, the species has been protected under Appendix II of the Convention on International Trade in Endangered Species of Wild Fauna and Flora (CITES).

== Growth, habitat and cultivation ==
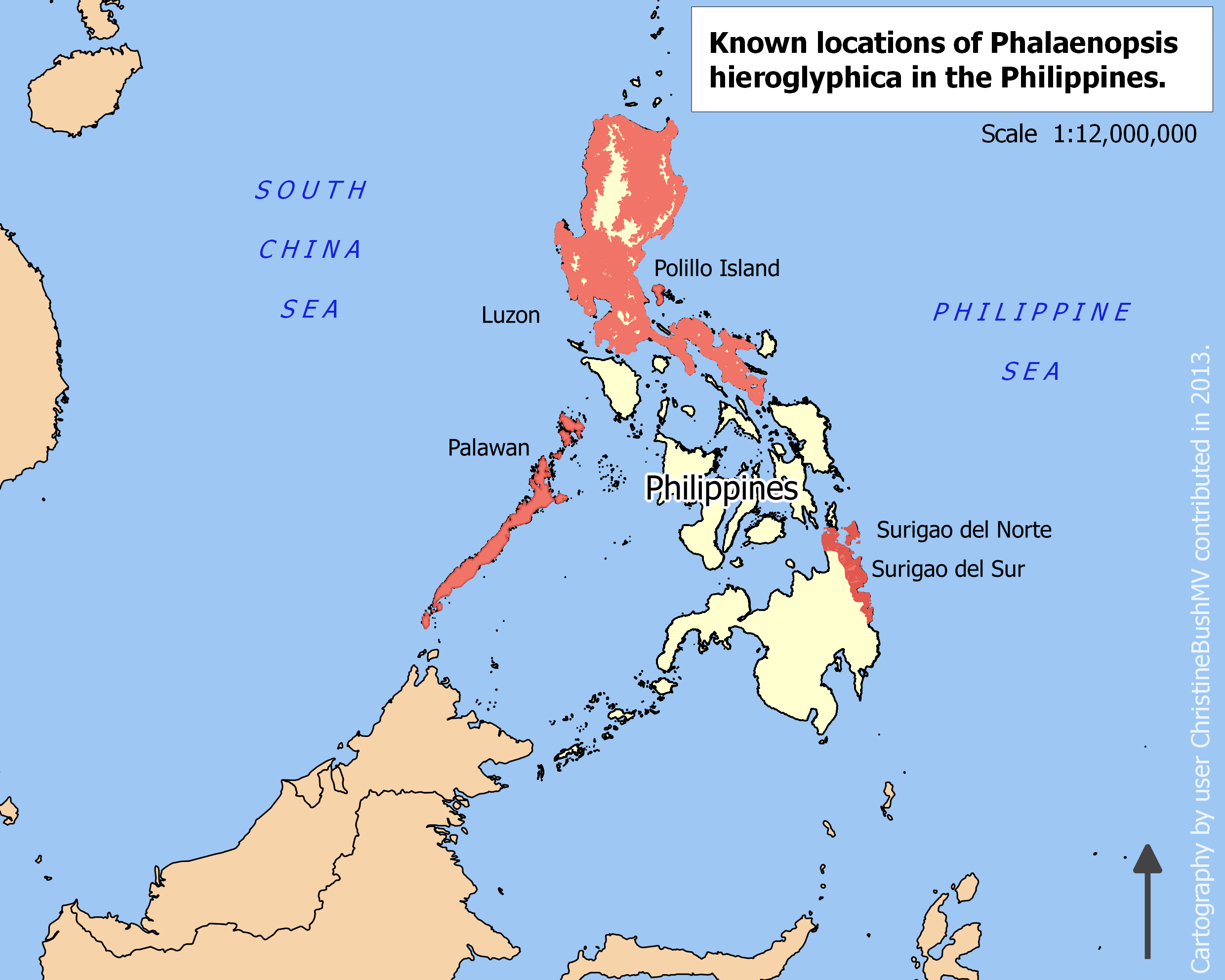
Map showing the known locations of Phalaenopsis hieroglyphica in five regions of the Philippines: Luzon, Palawan, Pollilo Island, Surigao del Norte, and Surigao del Sur.

Commonly P. hieroglyphica blooms in spring, with three to four star-shaped flowers that open simultaneously and last two to three months; a well-established specimen with keikis can produce more than 50 flowers. Their fragrance is said to be faintly rose-like or strongly citrus-like. The background of the flower can be white to ochre, sometimes with a tinge of green at the tips, and the glyphs on the sepals and stamens can be cinnamon or a purple hue. The flowers are comparatively larger and the glyphs more pronounced than those of P. lueddemanniana. The characteristic glyphs are retained in P. hieroglyphica hybrids.

As a monopodial epiphyte, it is found growing on and hanging down from trees in shady locations on the islands of Polillo, Palawan, Mindanao (in Surigao del Norte and Surigao del Sur), and Luzon at elevations below 1,700 feet (520 meters). Of its genus, this species grows in the coolest and deeply shady locations of humid forests. Not much is known about its natural habitat, including its pollinators.

The species was first cultivated in England by Hugh Low & Company from a specimen delivered by collector William Boxall in 1887.

Since 1975, this species has been considered vulnerable to extinction and listed in Appendix II of the Convention on International Trade in Endangered Species of Wild Fauna and Flora (CITES). To protect against overcollection, an export permit is required in international trade of specimens taken from their natural habitat. Protection from loss and degradation of the natural habitat is also a concern.

== Taxonomy ==
The accepted synonym Phalaenopsis lueddemanniana var. hieroglyphica reflects its naming in 1887 by German orchidologist H. G. Reichenbach. In 1969, American botanist H. R. Sweet elevated its ranking to species. The accepted synonym Polychilos hieroglyphica is traced to Malaysian botanist Shim in 1982.

The morphological characteristics of P. hieroglyphica reported by H. R. Sweet and Eric A. Christenson point to species classification and intragenus relationships confirmed by DNA analysis findings published in 2009.

== Anatomy of Phalaenopsis ==
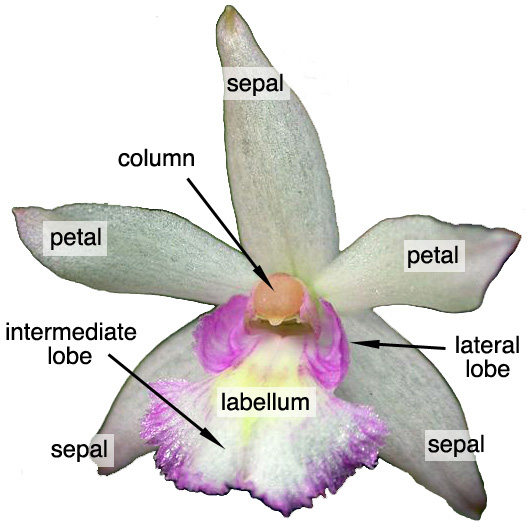
The parts of an orchid flower

In the epiphytes of Phalaenopsis, moisture is stored primarily in the leaves and photosynthesis-generating sugar primarily in the fleshy roots. In Phalaenopsis species with horizontal stems, such as P. hieroglyphica, the leaves are pendant and grow downward to drain rainwater away from the plant. The reproductive organ is the column, found between the two largest petals of Phalaenopsis orchids. The lip, connected to the flower by the column, aids in pollination. The lip in all Phalaenopsis orchids has three lobes, as depicted in a general orchid flower diagram (left). In the seminal work Fertilisation of Orchids, Charles Darwin detailed these and other observable characteristics of orchid specimens, including Phalaenopsis species, to determine biological mechanisms of species adaptation, survival and ecological relationships.

The leaf is oblong and leather-like, up to 12 inches (30 cm) long and 2.5 inches (6.4 cm) wide, tapering to the base, acute or obtuse at the tip. The inflorescence of Phalaenopsis ranges from arching to suberect, raceme or panicle, up to 13 inches (33 cm) long and many-flowered, with ovate to hooded bracts up to 0.2 inches (0.51 cm) long, appearing on the stem which emerges between the leaves. Flowers are star-shaped, up to 2 to 3.5 inches (5.1 to 8.9 centimetres), with transverse barring on the sepals and petals.

The Labellum or Lip is three-lobed, up to 1 inch (2.5 cm) long and 0.75 inches (1.9 cm) wide, with lateral lobes being cleft and oblong, the intermediate or mid-lobe being oblanceolate to obtuse with a raised central ridge covered with trichomes. The dorsal sepal is elliptic, inward-sloping, up to 1.5 inches (3.8 cm) long and 0.69 inches (1.8 cm) wide; the lateral sepal is obliquely oblong to elliptic and tapering, channeled along the midvein, up to 1.6 inches (4.1 cm) long and less than 0.75 inches (1.9 cm) wide.

Petals are ovate to elliptic, wedge-shaped, up to 1.3 inches (3.3 cm) long and 0.6 inches (1.5 cm) wide. The column is cylindrical and slightly arching, up to 0.5 inches (1.3 cm) long, and the pedicel and ovary are both up to 0.75 inches (19 mm) long.
