= Keiki =

Plant produced asexually by an orchid plant

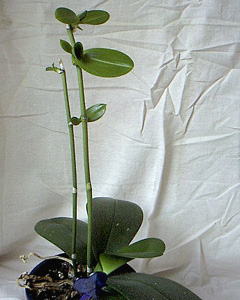
Apical keikis on Phalaenopsis mother plant

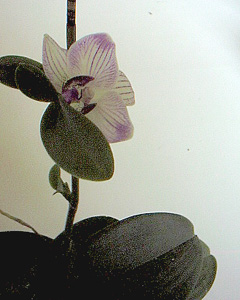
Apical keiki in flower on Phalaenopsis mother plant

In horticulture, a keiki (/ˈkeɪkiː/ KAY-kee) is a plant produced asexually by an orchid plant, especially Dendrobium, Epidendrum (sensu lato), and Phalaenopsis orchids. The baby plant is an exact clone of the mother plant, sometimes flowering while still attached to the mother. The word keiki is Hawaiian for 'baby' or 'child', literally meaning 'the little one'.

On a Phalaenopsis, a keiki is a small plant growing from one node along the flower stem. Keiki growth may be induced by prolonged exposure to high temperatures during the final phase of spike growth. On a Dendrobium, the keiki is typically found sprouting along the length of the cane or from the end of the cane.

In addition to keikis which grow on flower spikes, Phalaenopsis may occasionally produce basal keikis at the base of the orchid.

== Removing keikis ==
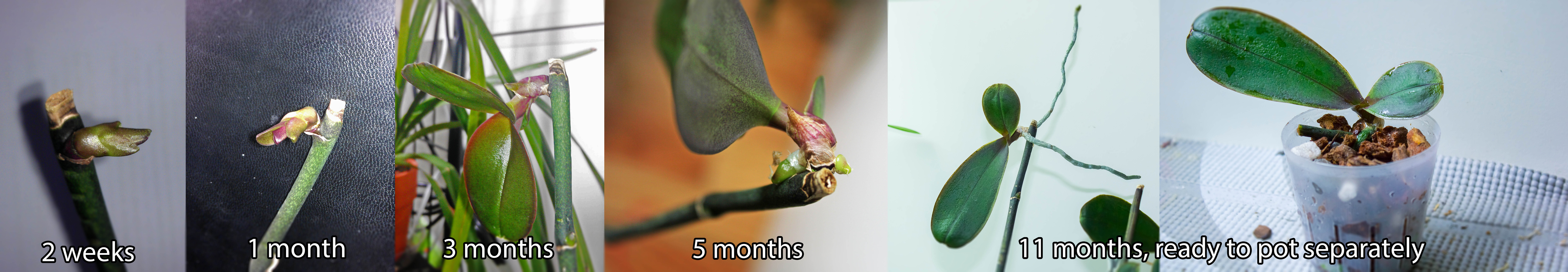
Phalaenopsis keiki growth progression

If a new plant is desired, the keiki should be left on the mother plant until it develops a healthy root system at least 3 inches (76 mm) long and has two or three leaves (for a Phalaenopsis) or canes (Dendrobium). For a Phalaenopsis keiki, this may take 6–12 months from when the keiki first forms. At this point, it can be carefully removed with a sharp knife and planted in its own pot. Keikis are cut below and above the stem, leaving a small piece of stem on the baby plant.

Some species orchids like Phalaenopsis pulchra frequently produce keikis, which flower while still attached to the mother plant.

If a new plant is not desired, the keiki can be removed at any time. Removing the entire inflorescence after flowering is complete can prevent the production of keikis and result in a "tidier" appearance for the plant.

== Hormone paste ==
Keiki paste is a cytokinin hormone which induces growth in the node of a Phalaenopsis inflorescence.

Nodes on Phalaenopsis spikes will form either vegetative growth (keiki) or floral growth (a branch with flower buds). If the node tissue is already differentiated so that it will become a floral branch, there is no way to change the result; therefore, the paste must be applied to the node before it is differentiated. However, there is no way to predict if an undifferentiated node will become a keiki or a floral branch.

== See also ==
- Phalaenopsis hieroglyphica
