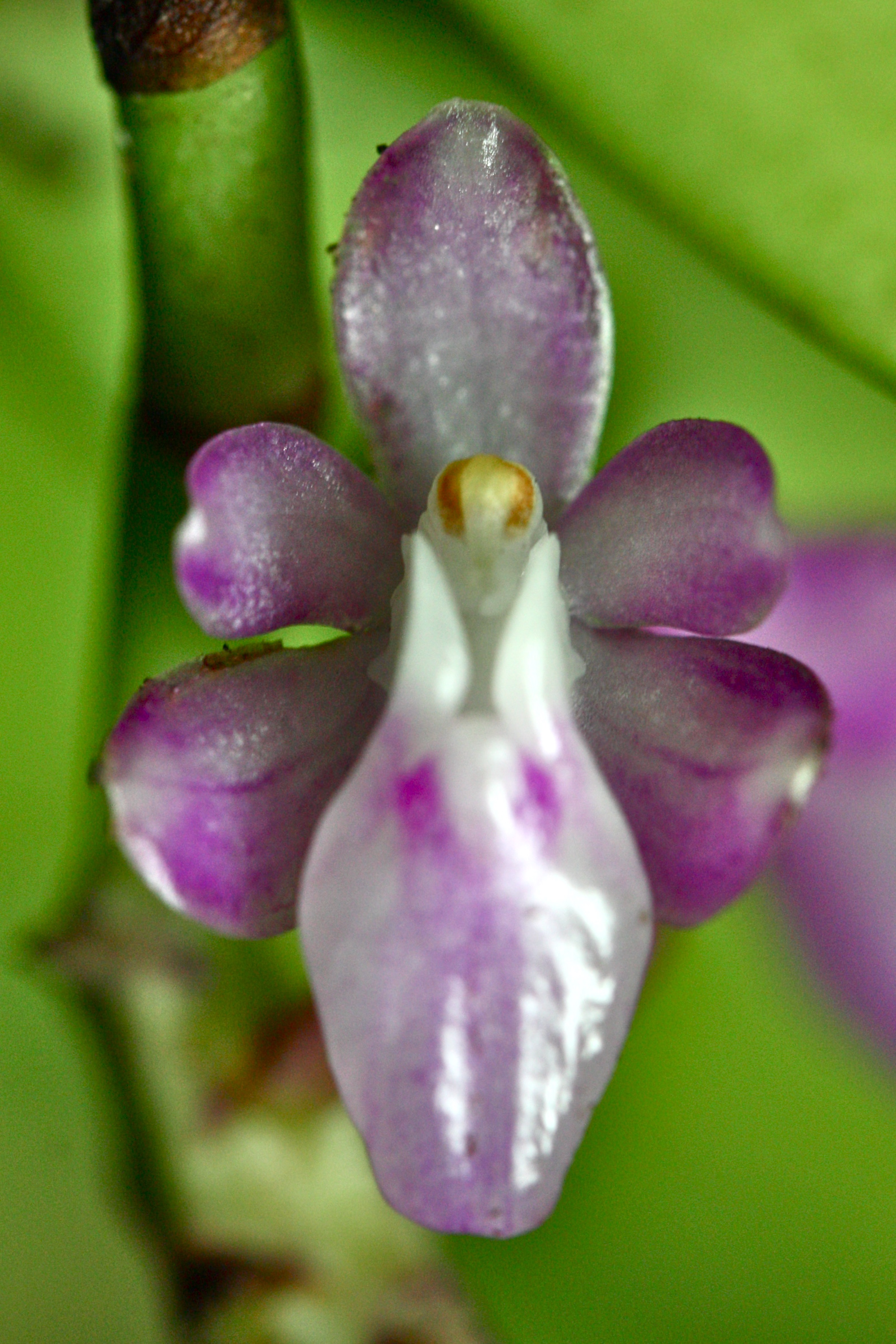

Scientific classification
- Kingdom: Plantae
- Clade: Tracheophytes
- Clade: Angiosperms
- Clade: Monocots
- Order: Asparagales
- Family: Orchidaceae
- Subfamily: Epidendroideae
- Genus: Micropera
- Species: M. utriculosa

Binomial name
- Micropera utriculosa (Ames) Garay

Synonyms
- Camarotis utriculosa Ames; Sarcanthus utriculosus (Ames) L.O.Williams; Micropera utriculosa var. diwata Lubag-Arquiza

= Micropera utriculosa =

Species of orchid

Micropera utriculosa is a species of orchid in the genus Micropera first described by Oakes Ames in 1915 under the name Camarotis utriculosa. It is endemic to the Philippines.
