= Dendrobium gnomus =

Scientific classification
- Kingdom: Plantae
- Clade: Tracheophytes
- Clade: Angiosperms
- Clade: Monocots
- Order: Asparagales
- Family: Orchidaceae
- Subfamily: Epidendroideae
- Genus: Dendrobium
- Species: D. gnomus

Binomial name
- Dendrobium gnomus Ames

Species of orchid

Dendrobium gnomus is a species of flowering plant in the family Orchidaceae, native to the Solomon Islands and the Santa Cruz Islands. It was first described in 1933 by Oakes Ames.
