= Charles Storer =

Charles Storer may refer to:

- Charles Storer (painter) (1817–1907), American painter
- Charlie Storer (1891–?), English footballer
