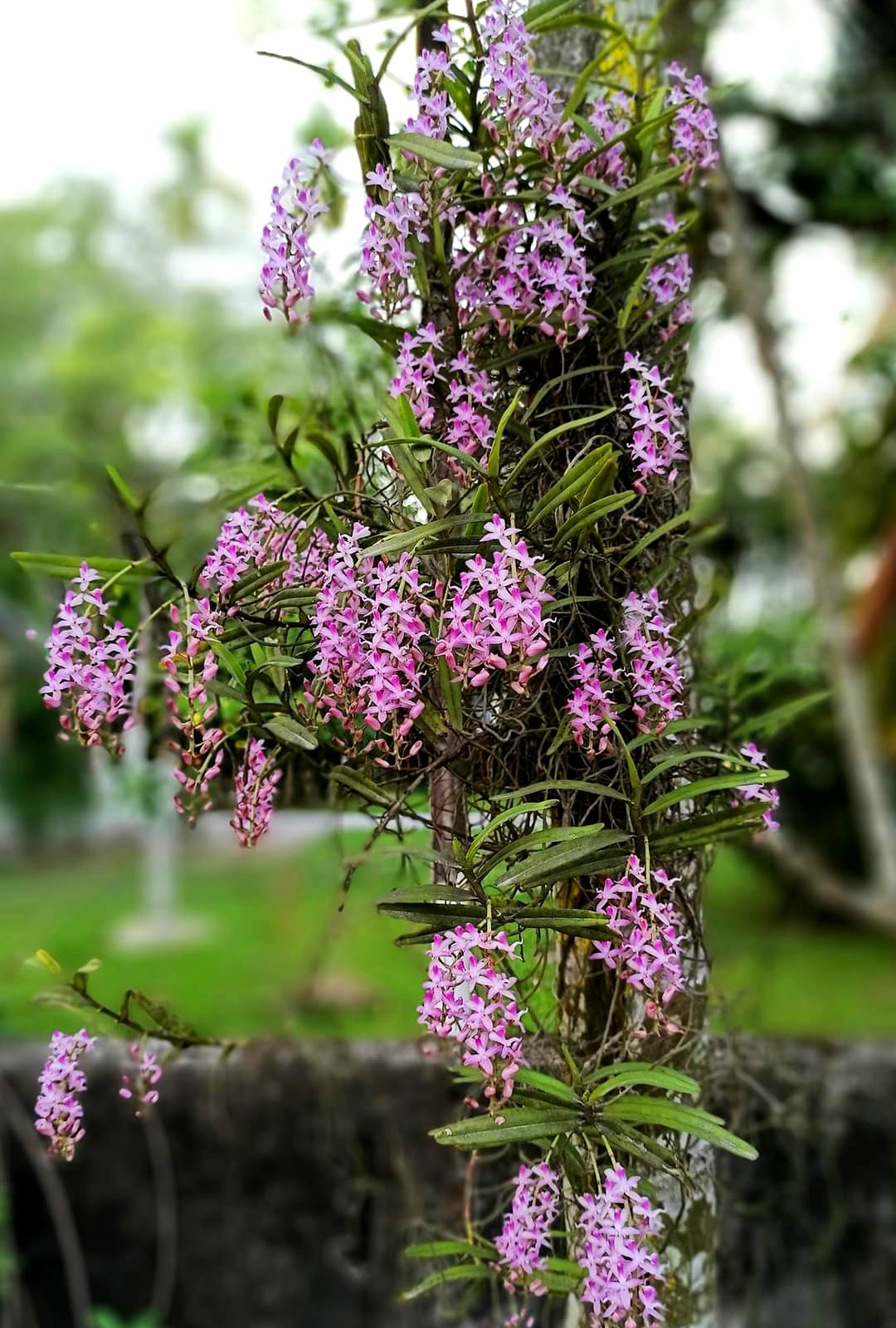

Scientific classification
- Kingdom: Plantae
- Clade: Tracheophytes
- Clade: Angiosperms
- Clade: Monocots
- Order: Asparagales
- Family: Orchidaceae
- Subfamily: Epidendroideae
- Genus: Micropera
- Species: M. rostrata

Binomial name
- Micropera rostrata (Roxb.) N.P.Balakr.

Synonyms
- Aerides rostrata Roxb.; Camarotis rostrata (Roxb.) Rchb.f.; Camarotis purpurea Lindl.; Sarcochilus keffordii Lindl.; Micropera purpurea (Lindl.) Pradhan; Sarcochilus purpureus Lindl.) Benth. ex Hook.f.

= Micropera rostrata =

Species of orchid

Micropera rostrata, commonly known as beaked micropera, is a species of medium to large sized tree-dwelling orchid. It is found in Assam, Bangladesh and eastern Himalayas. Beaked micropera blooms in the fall and early winter. Flowers are usually non-resupinate, fleshy, purple and fragrant.
