= Henry Frederick Conrad Sander =

German orchidologist and nurseryman (1847–1920)

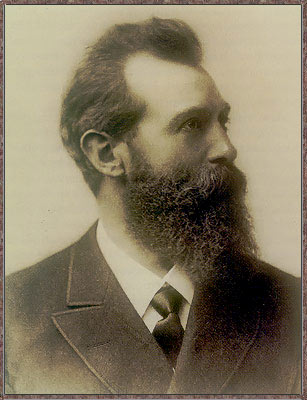

Henry Frederick Conrad Sander or Heinrich Friedrich Conrad Sander (4 March 1847 in Bremen – 23 December 1920 in Bruges) was a German-born orchidologist and nurseryman who settled in St Albans, Hertfordshire, England and is noted for his monthly publication on orchids, Reichenbachia, named in honour of Heinrich Gustav Reichenbach of Hamburg, the foremost German orchidologist.

== Life ==
In 1867 Sander entered the employ of James Carter & Co., a nursery at Forest Hill, meeting the Czech explorer and plant collector Benedict Roezl. Roezl had been shipping plants to England for some time, but needed a reliable agent there to manage sales, leaving him free to collect and explore. Their business association was to prove a profitable one.

Sander resigned from Carter & Co., and set up business as a seedsman in St Albans. Roezl shipped enormous consignments of orchids and tropical plants, filling a vast warehouse near the seed shop. Sander's marketing of the plants was so successful that Roezl retired in comfort to his native city of Prague.

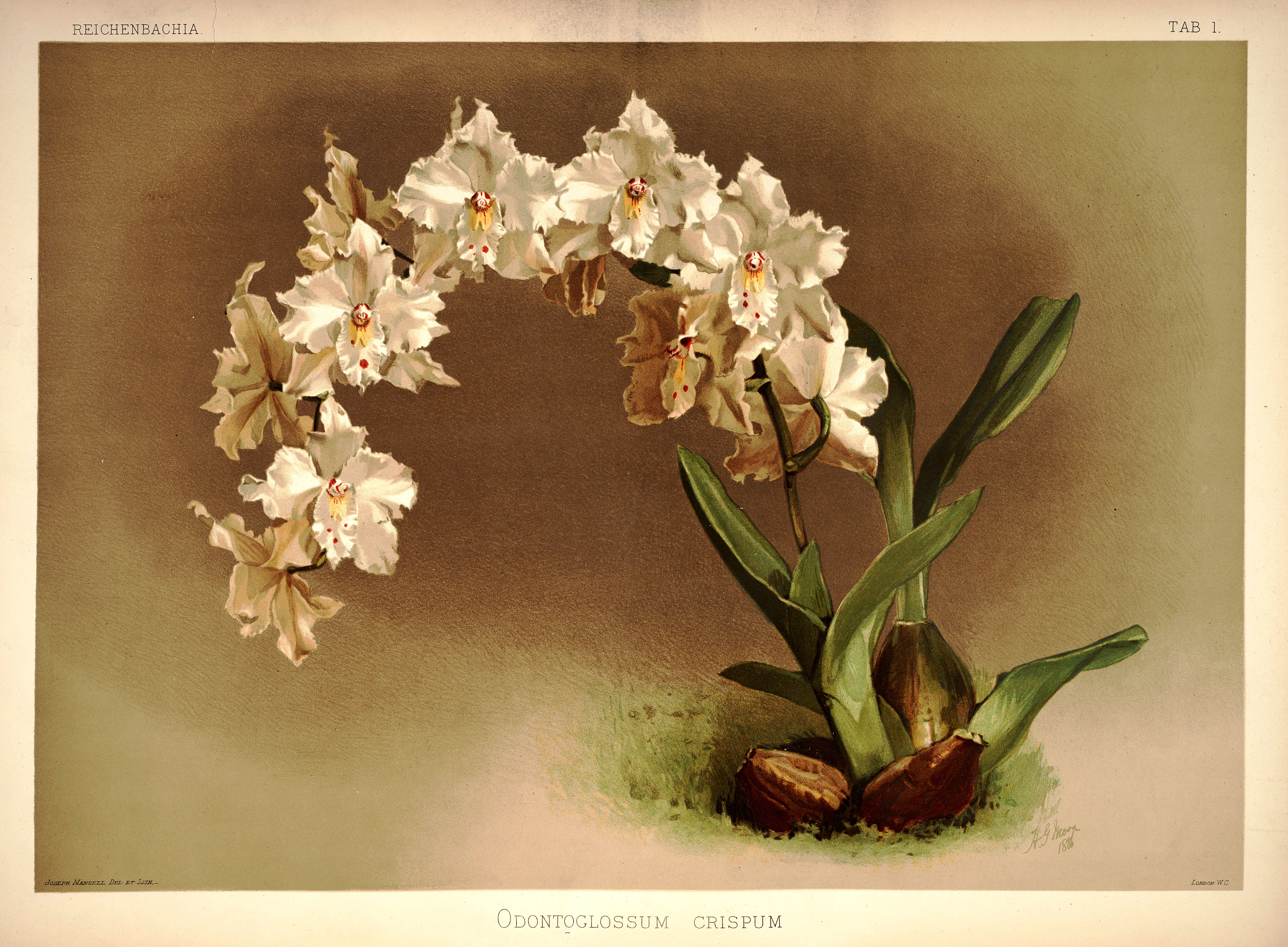
Sander's illustration of Odontoglossum crispum from Reichenbachia

Sander, on the other hand, got rid of the seed business and concentrated on orchids. His premises soon proved to be too small to house his enormous collections, and in 1881 he acquired 4 acres (16,000 m^{2}) of ground in St Albans on which to build a new nursery and home. The greatly enlarged quarters and Sander's business acumen supported the employment of up to twenty three collectors to search forests and mountainous areas in Asia and South America for new species. Some sixty greenhouses accommodated the vast stock of the finest orchids to be found. Large conservatories were given over to the production of seed, and new hybrids were constantly evaluated. Sander's of St Albans handled about two million plants in the 1880s and 1890s, becoming the focus of orchid culture in Europe, where crowned heads were familiar visitors. Sander published various addenda to his Book of Hybrids, properly titled Sander's Complete List of Orchid Hybrids (St Albans 1906).

In 1885 Sander envisioned the monumental publication Reichenbachia, which would depict orchids life-sized, with text in English, French and German. The folio edition measured a gigantic 678 mm x 510 mm (21.5 inches by 16 inches), and was bound in leather. The work appeared in two series of two volumes each. Volume one of series one was published in 1888 and had 108 pages and 48 plates. Volume two of series one appeared in 1890 with 106 pages and 48 plates. Volume one of series two appeared in 1892 with 52 plates in a 104-page volume. Volume two of series two, the final volume published, consisted of 114 pages with 55 plates. The volumes were in turn dedicated to Queen Victoria, the Empress of Germany and Queen of Prussia, the Empress of Russia, and Queen of the Belgians.

He commissioned his future son-in-law, Henry Moon, to do the illustrations for the monthly publication of what was to be called Reichenbachia, a work which would require their collaboration for the next few years. Work started in 1886 and went on until 1890, with turbulent disputes due to artistry conflicting with pragmatism. Moon married Sander's only daughter in January 1894, and spent another ten years painting orchids before his untimely death in 1905 at the relatively youthful age of 48.

With his commercial success, Sander planned American outlets in the 1880s, establishing a nursery in Summit, New Jersey, US and appointing one of his collectors, Forsterman, to manage the branch. The management logistics proved to be extremely complex, so that it was sold to John Lager and Henry Hurrell in 1896. This firm continued to operate until the 1970s, briefly moving from Summit to Lilburn, Georgia, US before being dissolved. Sander also started a nursery at St André in Bruges in 1894.

Sander is commemorated by the Orchidaceae genus Sanderella O.Kuntze as well as having an Alocasia species, Alocasia sanderiana, named after him. In 1913 he was awarded the Belgian Insignia of Chevalier of the Order of the Crown.
