= Reichenbachia: Orchids Illustrated and Described =

Four-volume 19th-century text about orchids, with text in English, French, and German

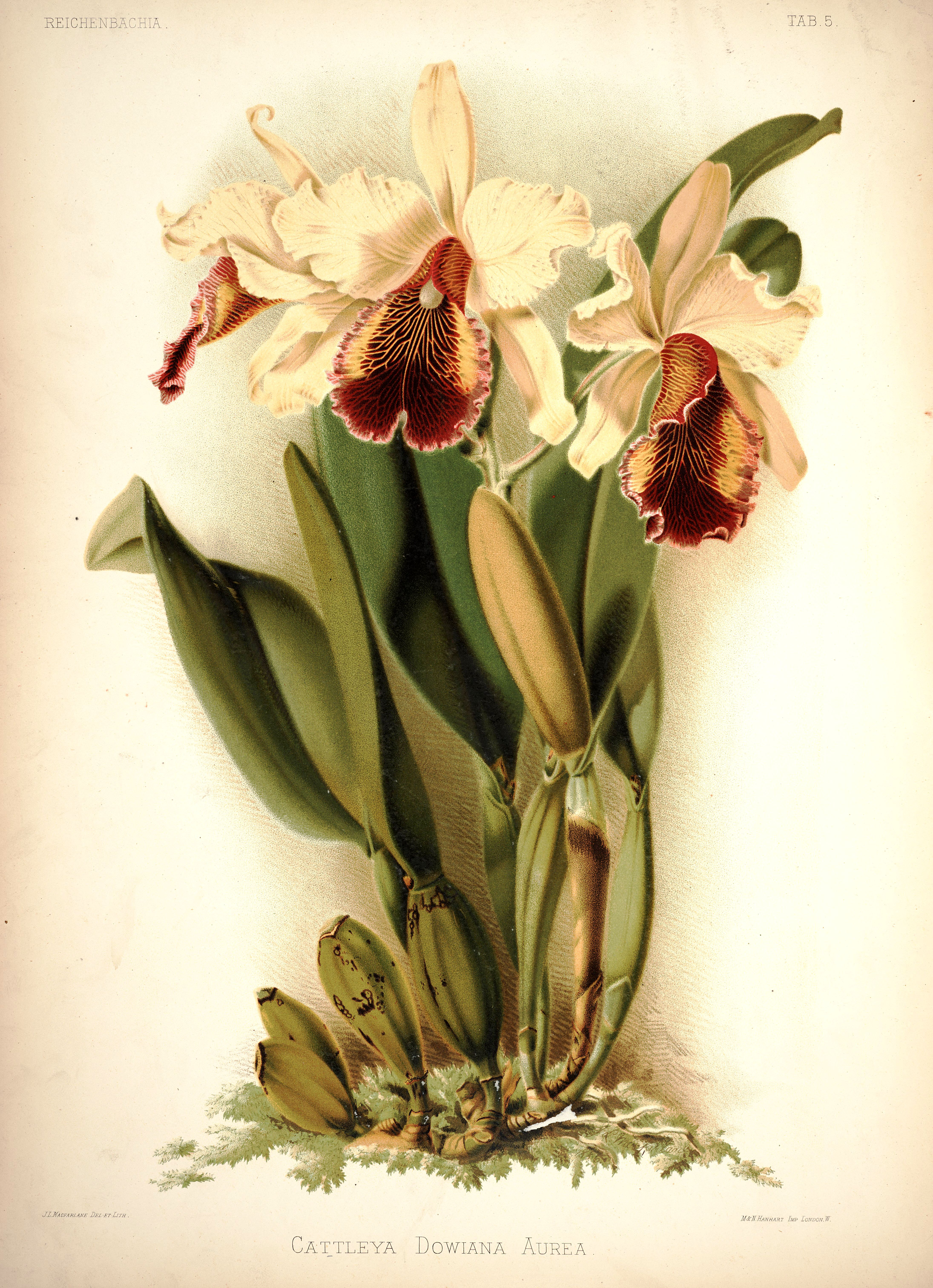
Cattleya dowiana aurea, from Reichenbachia Series I Volume I Plate 5.

Reichenbachia: Orchids Illustrated and Described is a four-volume 19th-century text created by German-born orchidologist Frederick Sander which features life-size illustrations and descriptions of nearly two hundred orchids with text in English, French, and German. Named in honor of the renowned German orchidologist Heinrich Gustav Reichenbach, Reichenbachia was a collaboration between Sander and English landscape painter Henry George Moon, who created most of the illustrations. Work on Reichenbachia began in 1886 and lasted until 1890, with the first volume being published in 1888, with the subsequent three volumes being published in two-year intervals.

Reichenbachia was created as a two-series set with two volumes per series, with two separate editions being published. Each volume contained 48 illustrations with text in German, French, and English. The folio edition measures 21.5 by 16 inches (550 by 410 mm), and the rare Imperial Edition, of which 100 copies were made, measures 29.5 by 23.5 inches (750 by 600 mm), weighing 44 pounds per volume. The four volumes were dedicated to Queen Victoria; Augusta Victoria of Schleswig-Holstein, Empress of Germany and Queen of Prussia; Maria Feodorovna, Empress of Russia; and Marie Henriette of Austria respectively.

The plates were created using woodcut blocks, chromolithography, and in a few cases hand colored. Other illustrators that contributed are W. H. Fitch, A. H. Loch, George Hansen, Charles Storer, J. Watton, and James Laird Macfarlane.
