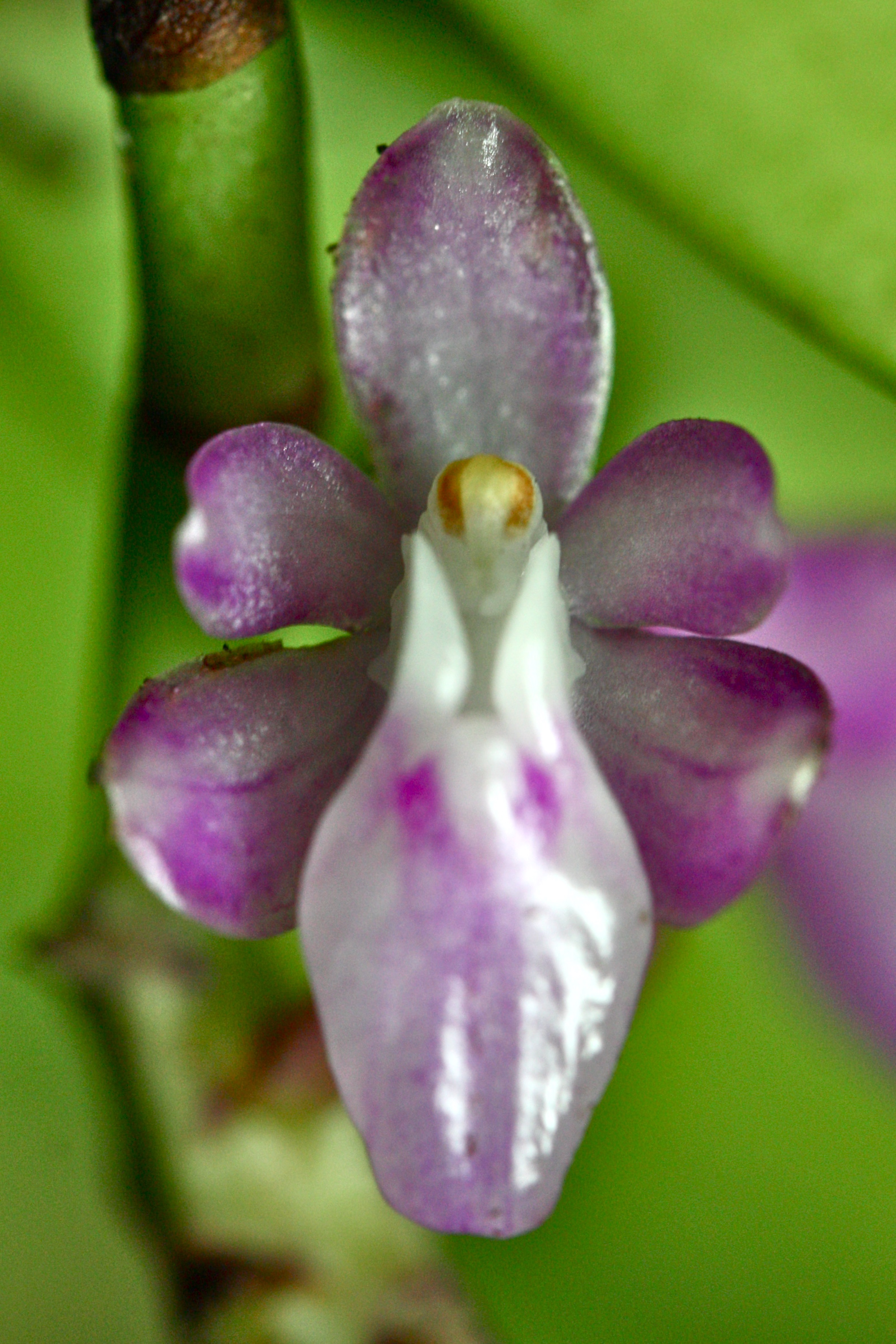
- Micropera utriculosa

Scientific classification
- Kingdom: Plantae
- Clade: Tracheophytes
- Clade: Angiosperms
- Clade: Monocots
- Order: Asparagales
- Family: Orchidaceae
- Subfamily: Epidendroideae
- Tribe: Vandeae
- Subtribe: Aeridinae
- Genus: Micropera; Lindl.

Synonyms
- Camarotis Lindl.

= Micropera =

Genus of orchids

Micropera, commonly known as dismal orchids or 小囊兰属 (xiao nang lan shu) is a genus of about twenty species of flowering plants from the orchid family, Orchidaceae. Plants in this genus are large epiphytes with thick roots, long, fibrous stems, linear leaves and whitish or yellow, non-resupinate flowers. The sepals and petals are similar to each other and the labellum is shoe-shaped or sac-like and has three lobes. It is found from Tibet to tropical Asia and the western Pacific Ocean.

== Description ==
Orchids in the genus Micropera are epiphytic, monopodial herbs with fibrous stems up to 1 metre (3.3 ft) long supported at intervals by coarse, thick roots. Widely spaced, leathery, linear leaves up to 170 millimetres (6.7 in) long and 20 millimetres (0.79 in) wide are arranged along the stems. Short flowering stems emerge oppose the leaves bearing non-resupinate, whitish, pink or yellowish flowers. The sepals and petals are narrow, fleshy and similar to and free from each other. The labellum is shoe-shaped or sac-like with a prominent spur near its base and has three lobes. The side lobes are broad and erect.

== Taxonomy and naming ==
The genus Micropera was first formally described in 1832 by John Lindley and the description was published in Edwards's Botanical Register. The name Micropera is derived from the Ancient Greek words mikros meaning "small" or "little" and pera meaning "pouch" or "wallet".

== Distribution ==
Species of Micropera are found from the Himalayas to China, Malaysia, Indonesia, the Philippines, New Guinea, the Solomon Islands and Australia.

=== Species list ===
The following is a list of Micropera species accepted by the World Checklist of Selected Plant Families as at December 2018:

- Micropera callosa (Blume) Garay - Borneo, Sumatra, Java
- Micropera cochinchinensis (Rchb.f.) Tang & F.T.Wang - Vietnam
- Micropera costulata (J.J.Sm.) Garay - Sumatra
- Micropera draco (Tuyama) P.J.Cribb & Ormerod - Micronesia
- Micropera edanoi Ormerod - Philippines
- Micropera fasciculata (Lindl.) Garay - Queensland, New Guinea, New Caledonia, Solomons
- Micropera fuscolutea (Lindl.) Garay - Malaysia, Borneo
- Micropera loheri (L.O.Williams) Garay - Luzon
- Micropera mannii (Hook.f.) Tang & F.T.Wang - Assam, Bhutan
- Micropera obtusa (Lindl.) Tang & F.T.Wang - Assam, India, Bhutan, Nepal, Myanmar, Thailand
- Micropera pallida (Roxb.) Lindl. - Assam, India, Bhutan, Nepal, Myanmar, Thailand, Cambodia, Laos, Vietnam, Malaysia, Borneo, Sumatra, Java
- Micropera philippinensis (Lindl.) Garay - Philippines
- Micropera poilanei (Guillaumin) Garay - Hainan, Vietnam
- Micropera proboscidea (J.J.Sm.) Garay - Malaysia, Sumatra
- Micropera rostrata (Roxb.) N.P.Balakr. - Arunachal Pradesh, Assam, Bangladesh
- Micropera secunda (Rolfe) Tang & F.T.Wang - Myanmar
- Micropera sheryliae P.O'Byrne & J.J.Verm. - Malaysia
- Micropera sterrophylla (Schltr.) Garay - Sulawesi
- Micropera thailandica (Seidenf. & Smitinand) Garay - Thailand, Vietnam
- Micropera tibetica X.H.Jin & Y.J.Lai – Tibet
- Micropera uncinata (Teijsm. & Binn.) Garay - Java
- Micropera utriculosa (Ames) Gara - Philippines

== See also ==
- List of Orchidaceae genera
