= Heinrich Gustav Reichenbach =

German botanist (1824–1889)

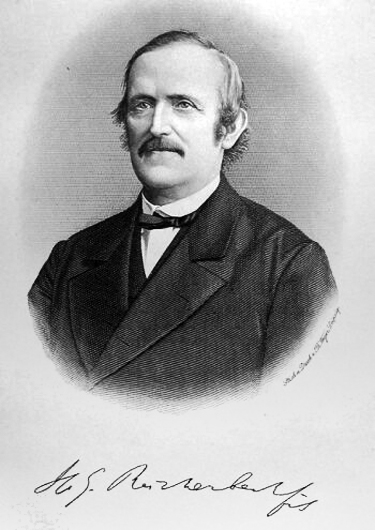
- Heinrich Gustav Reichenbach
- Born: 3 January 1823; Dresden, Saxony, German Confederation
- Died: 6 May 1889 (aged 66); Hamburg, German Empire
- Occupations: botanist and orchidologist
- Spouse: Kathelijne de Bruyn(e)
- Father: Heinrich Gottlieb Ludwig Reichenbach
- Scientific career
- Author abbrev. (botany): Rchb.f.

Heinrich Gustav Reichenbach (Dresden, 3 January 1823 – Hamburg, 6 May 1889) was a botanist and the foremost German orchidologist of the 19th century. His father Heinrich Gottlieb Ludwig Reichenbach (author of Icones Florae Germanicae et Helveticae) was also a well-known botanist.

== Biography ==
He started his study of orchids at the age of 18 and assisted his father in the writing of Icones. He became a Doctor in Botany with his work on the pollen of orchids (see ‘Selected Works’).

Soon after his graduation, Reichenbach was appointed to the post of extraordinary professor of botany at the Leipzig in 1855. He then became director of the botanical gardens at the Hamburg University (1863-1889).

At that time, thousands of newly discovered orchids were being sent back to Europe. He was responsible for identifying, describing, classifying. Reichenbach named and recorded many of these new discoveries. He probably was not the easiest of personalities, and used to boast about his many descriptions, some of which were superficial, leading to a great deal of taxonomic confusion.

H.G. Reichenbach became the world's leading authority on orchids, after the death of his friend, the 'father of orchidology' John Lindley in 1865. Reichenbach spoke English extremely well. He made many visits, sometimes lasting many weeks, to Kew and the herbarium of the British Museum, as well as visits to English professional and private growers of orchids. His last visit to England was in the autumn of 1887.

"Orchid specimens from all over the world were sent to him for identification, and these, together with his copious notes and drawings, forms an immense herbarium which rivaled that of Lindley at Kew" (Reinikka, 'A history of the orchid', p. 215).

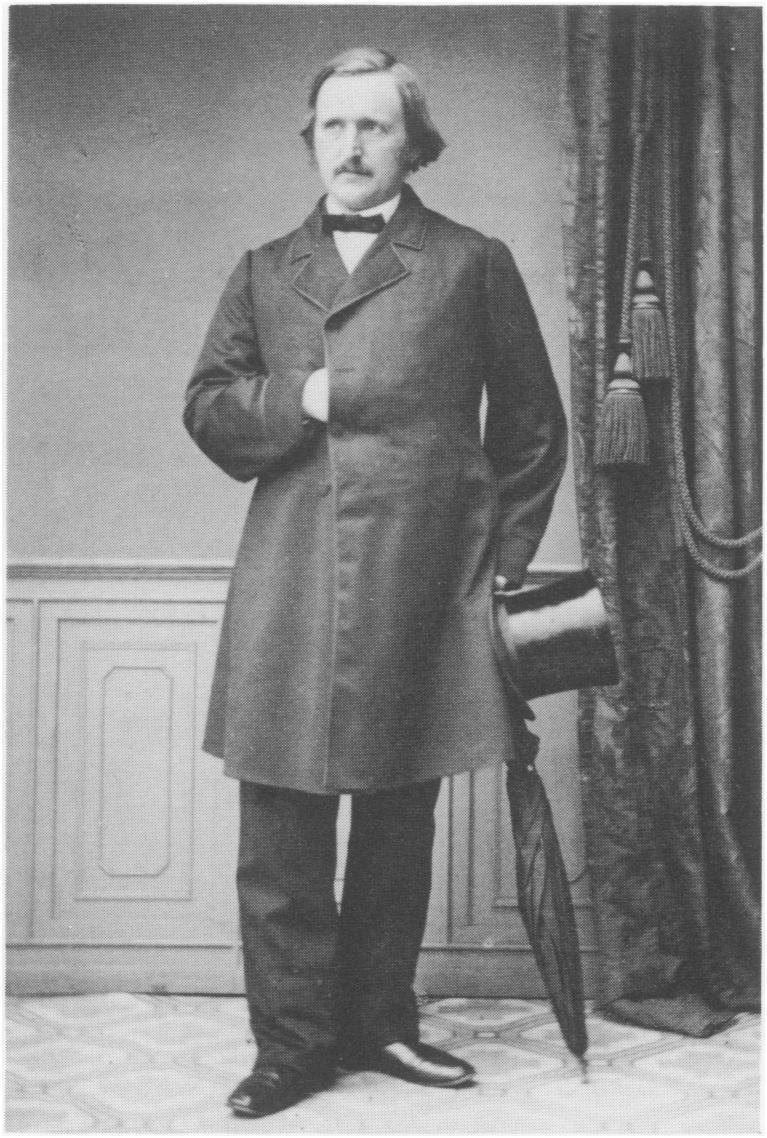

His immense herbarium and library were bequeathed to the 'Naturhistorisches Museum' in Vienna, Austria (instead, as expected, to the Kew Gardens), on the condition that it would not be consulted during the first 25 years after his death. Reichenbach probably acted this way out of resentment of the appointment of Robert Allen Rolfe, a self-taught orchid expert, as the top taxonomist at Kew. This resulted in a great number of double or multiple descriptions of orchid species, which had to be corrected afterwards.

After Reichenbach's death, his work was continued by Friedrich Wilhelm Ludwig (“Fritz”) Kraenzlin (1847-1934).

In 1886, Frederick Sander commissioned Henry George Moon (1857-1905), a pure colourist, to paint 192 watercolour plates of orchids with descriptions by Reichenbach (1888-1894). These monthly publications became known as the Reichenbachia and are the richest reference sources on orchids ever produced.

== Eponymous taxa ==
- Reichenbachanthus
- Chondrorhyncha reichenbachiana (now a synonym of Benzingia reichenbachiana (Schltr.) Dressler 2005)
- Masdevallia reichenbachiana
- Microstylis reichenbachiana
- Phalaenopsis reichenbachiana
- Pinguicula longifolia subsp. reichenbachiana
- Restrepiopsis reichenbachiana
- Sievekingia reichenbachiana
- Stanhopea reichenbachiana

== Selected works ==
- Reichenbach, H. G. (1852). De pollinis Orchidearum genesi ac structura et de Orchideis in artem ac systema redigendis. Commentatio quam ex auctoritate amplissimi philosophorum ordinis die mensis julii decimo hora decima MDCCCLII illustris ictorum ordinis concessu in auditorio juridico pro venia docendi impetranda publice defendet. (on the origin and structure of orchid pollen). Leipzig: F. Hofmeister.
- Reichenbach, H. G. (1866). Beiträge zu einer Orchideenkunde Central-Amerika's. Hamburg: T. G. Meissner.
- Reichenbach, H. G.; Kraenzlin, W. L. (1858–1900). Xenia Orchidacea. Beiträge zur Kenntniss der Orchideen. Leipzig: F. A. Brockhaus.

== See also ==
- Phalaenopsis hieroglyphica, an orchid first described by Reichenbach as a variety of P. lueddemanniana
