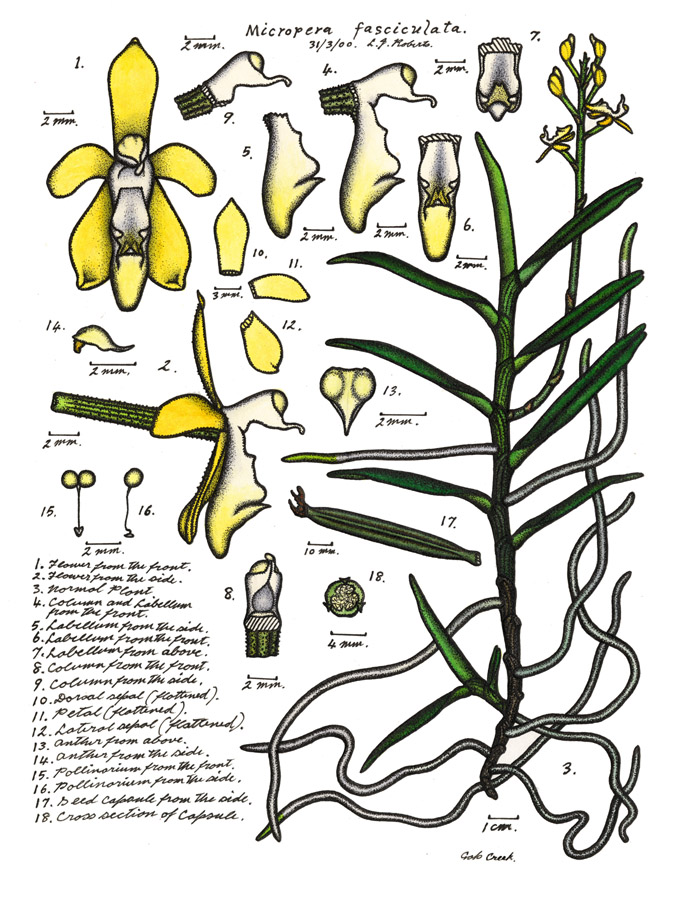
- Illustration by Lewis Roberts

Scientific classification
- Kingdom: Plantae
- Clade: Tracheophytes
- Clade: Angiosperms
- Clade: Monocots
- Order: Asparagales
- Family: Orchidaceae
- Subfamily: Epidendroideae
- Genus: Micropera
- Species: M. fasciculata

Binomial name
- Micropera fasciculata (Lindl.) Garay

Synonyms
- Gastrochilus fasciculatus (Lindl.) Kuntze; Saccolabium fasciculatum Lindl.; Camarotis copelandii (F.M.Bailey) J.J.Sm.; Camarotis keffordii (F.M.Bailey) J.J.Sm.; Camarotis papuana (J.J.Sm.) J.J.Sm.; Cleisostoma keffordii F.M.Bailey; Saccolabium copelandii F.M.Bailey; Sarcanthus papuanus J.J.Sm.; Sarcochilus keffordii (F.M.Bailey) F.Muell.

= Micropera fasciculata =

Pale dismal orchid

Species of orchid

Micropera fasciculata, commonly known as the pale dismal orchid, is a species of epiphytic or lithophytic orchid with wiry stems forming large, tangled clumps. It has stiff, leathery leaves and flowering stems with between ten and twenty cream-coloured flowers with a white labellum. This orchid occurs in New Guinea, Queensland, the Solomon Islands and New Caledonia.

== Description ==
Micropera fasciculata is an epiphytic or lithophytic herb that forms large tangled clumps and has thick roots and wiry stems 30–120 centimetres (12–47 in) long. Between five and twenty stiff, leathery, oblong leaves 80–150 millimetres (3.1–5.9 in) long, 20–30 millimetres (0.79–1.2 in) wide are arranged along the upper half of the stems. Between ten and twenty fragrant, cream-coloured flowers, 27–30 millimetres (1.1–1.2 in) long and 12–15 millimetres (0.47–0.59 in) wide are arranged on flowering stems 120–250 millimetres (4.7–9.8 in) long arising opposite the leaves. The dorsal sepal is about 9 millimetres (0.35 in) long and 3 millimetres (0.12 in) wide, the lateral sepals about 7 millimetres (0.28 in) long and 3.5 millimetres (0.14 in) wide and curved behind the labellum. The petals are similar is size to the lateral sepals. The labellum is white, erect, about 9 millimetres (0.35 in) long and 2.5 millimetres (0.098 in) wide with three lobes. The side lobes are triangular and erect and the middle lobe curves downwards with a deep, sac-like spur. Flowering occurs from March to June.

== Taxonomy and naming ==
The pale dismal orchid was first formally described in 1843 by John Lindley who gave it the name Saccolobium fasciculatum and published the description in London Journal of Botany. In 1972 Leslie Andrew Garay changed the name to Micropera fasciculata.

== Distribution and habitat ==
Micropera fasciculata forms large clumps on trees and rocks in lowland rainforest in New Guinea, the Solomon Islands, New Caledonia and the Cape York Peninsula in Queensland as far south as Townsville.
