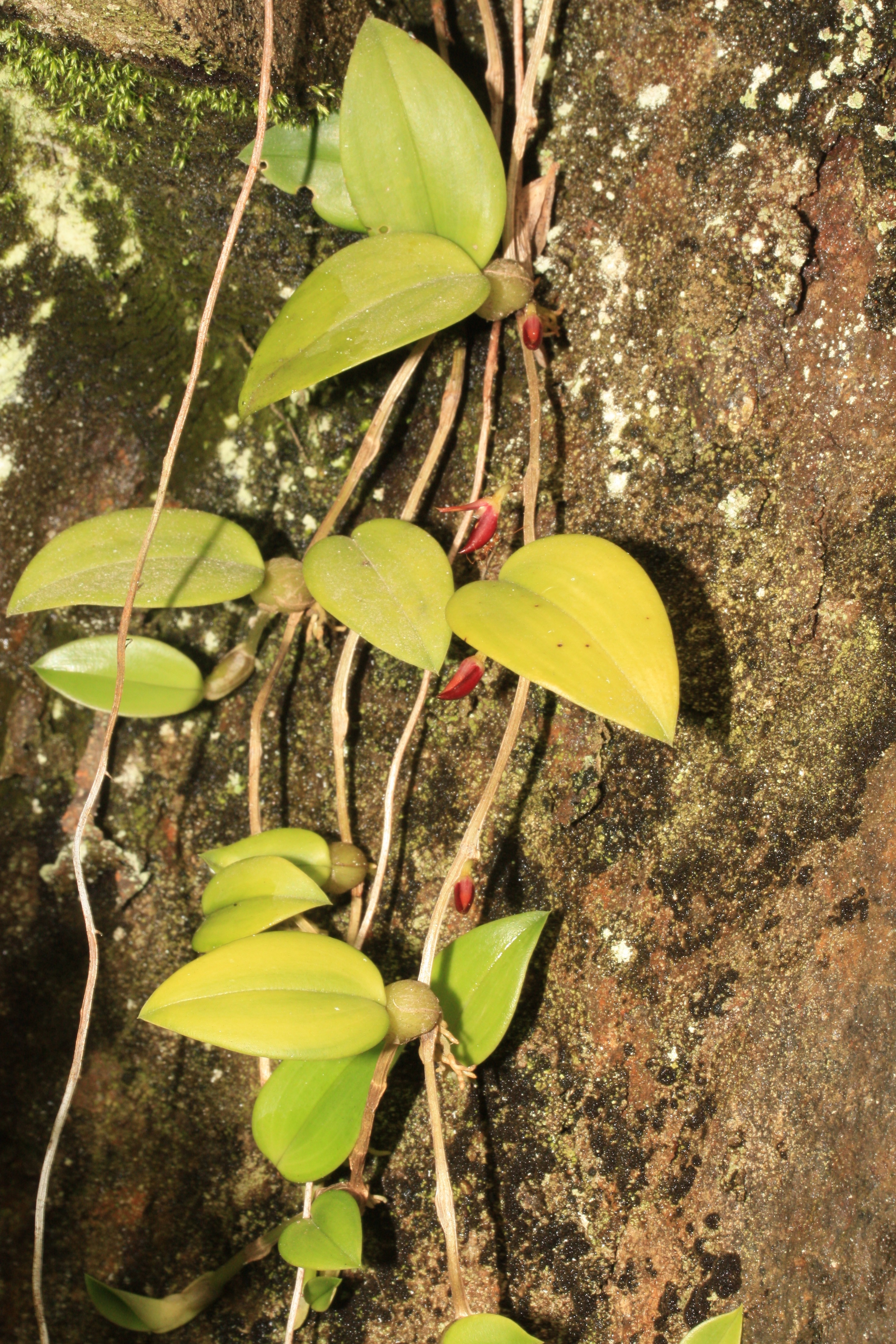

Scientific classification
- Kingdom: Plantae
- Clade: Tracheophytes
- Clade: Angiosperms
- Clade: Monocots
- Order: Asparagales
- Family: Orchidaceae
- Subfamily: Epidendroideae
- Genus: Bulbophyllum
- Species: B. membranaceum

Binomial name
- Bulbophyllum membranaceum Teijsm. & Binn.

Synonyms
- Diphyes membranacea (Teijsm. & Binn.) Szlach. & Rutk. 2008; Phyllorkis membranacea (Teijsm. & Binn.) Kuntze 1891; Bulbophyllum avicella Ridl. 1896; Bulbophyllum ciliatoides Seidenf. 1975; Bulbophyllum gibbonianum Schltr. 1921; Bulbophyllum nuruanum Schltr. 1905

= Bulbophyllum membranaceum =

Species of orchid

Bulbophyllum membranaceum is a species of orchid in the genus Bulbophyllum. It produces small maroon coloured flowers about six millimeters long. The pseudobulbs are rounded and each carries a single leaf. It is native to Papua New Guinea, Fiji, Samoa, Borneo, Sumatra, and other countries in the South East Asia region.
