= Henry Moon =

English painter

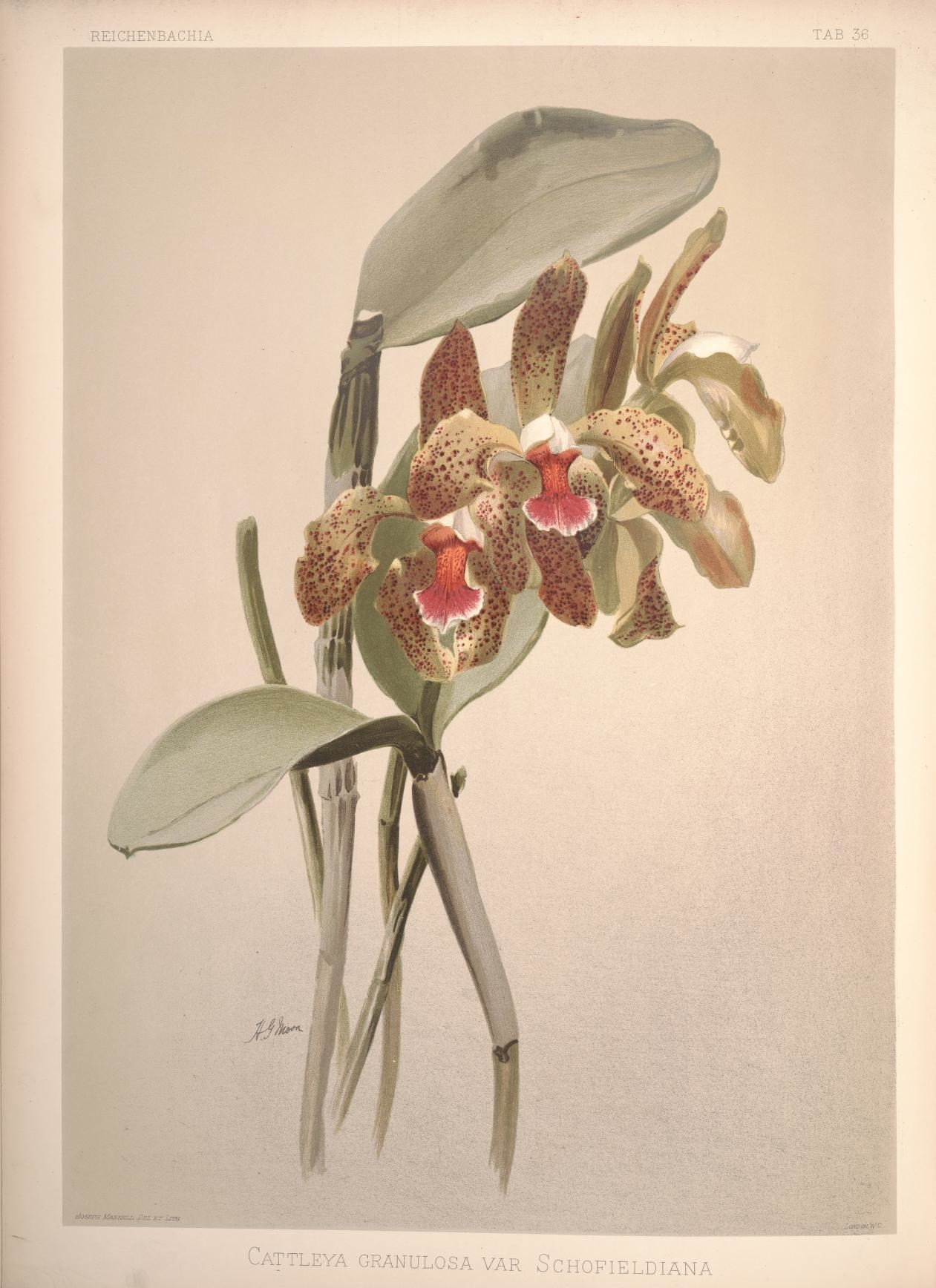
Cattleya granulosa var schofieldiana

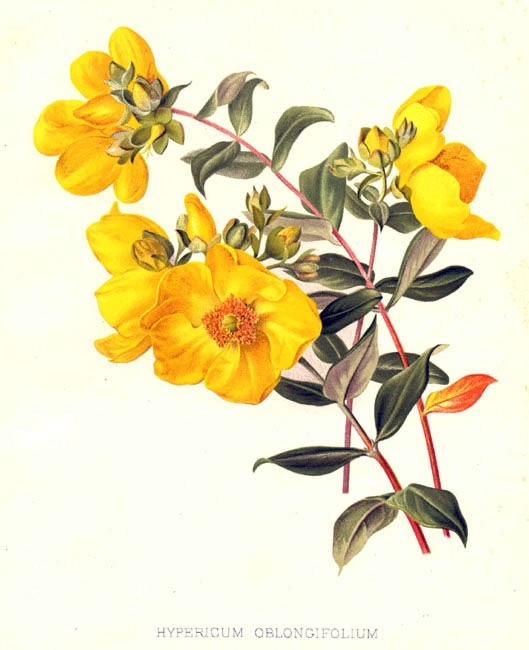
Hypericum oblongifolium

Henry George Moon (18 February 1857 Barnet, Hertfordshire – 6 October 1905 St Albans, Hertfordshire), was an English landscape and botanical painter, noted for his orchid paintings illustrating Reichenbachia, a monthly publication named in honour of Heinrich Gustav Reichenbach of Hamburg, the great orchidologist.

He was the eldest son of Henry Moon, parliamentary agent at Westminster. He received his schooling at Dr. Bell's in Barnet, and later became a student at the Birkbeck and Saint Martin's schools of art.

When he was 21, Moon worked as a legal clerk intending to become a barrister, but in 1880 his interest in art led to his joining the art team of The Garden, a fashionable horticultural journal. From then on, Moon created most of the magazine's coloured plates. He spent much time during this period furthering his interest in landscape painting, and was greatly influenced by a companion, William Edward Norton (1843–1916), an American painter. Moon also contributed art work to The English Flower Garden, Wild Garden, and Flora and Silva.

Moon first went to St Albans in 1884, visiting the orchid nursery of Frederick Sander in order to make drawings for The English Flower Garden, which was being published by William Robinson. In 1885, Sander approached him about illustrating the Reichenbachia. Moon devoted the following four years of his life to painting most of the plates, and directing the printing side which was done by hand in Sander's printing works at St Albans. Moon produced the woodcuts and the printing was carried out by a certain Mr. Moffat.

In the autumn of 1892, Moon settled permanently in St Albans with his mother and sister. Two years later he married Sander's daughter and produced a steady flow of paintings for Sander and a number of publications. He was frequently to be found in the countryside, painting and sketching.

Moon did most of the plates for Reichenbachia, with a number of other artists contributing. Some of the work is unsigned, known contributors being Walter Hood Fitch, A. H. Loch, George Hansen, Charles Storer (1817–1907), J. Watton, and J. L. Macfarlane.

He played an active and valued role in art circles as judge and critic, and often attended working sessions and exhibitions at the London sketching clubs - the Birkbeck, the Gilbert-Garrett, the Langhorn, and the Polytechnic.

Moon's already frail health suffered as a result of the constant demands placed on it - doing his own framing, and dealing with the constant claims made on his time and energy from other sources. His death at the relatively youthful age of forty-eight, brought great sorrow to his family, the firm of Sander, and the worlds of botanical art and orchid culture. He left his widow and two young sons.
