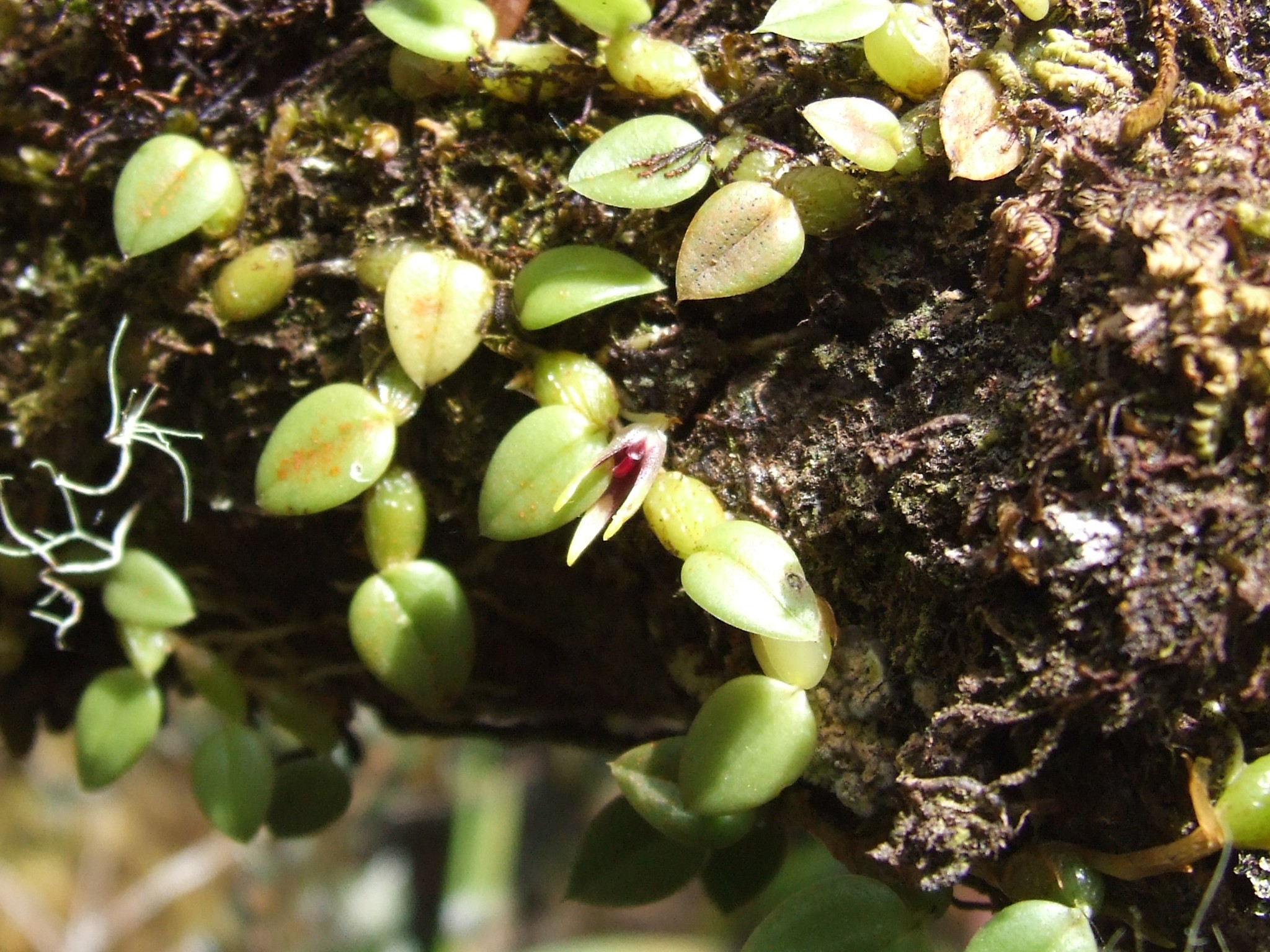
- B. depressum in Sabah, Malaysia

Scientific classification
- Kingdom: Plantae
- Clade: Tracheophytes
- Clade: Angiosperms
- Clade: Monocots
- Order: Asparagales
- Family: Orchidaceae
- Subfamily: Epidendroideae
- Genus: Bulbophyllum
- Species: B. depressum

Binomial name
- Bulbophyllum depressum King & Pantl.

Synonyms
- Bulbophyllum acutum J.J.Sm.; Bulbophyllum hastatum Tang & F.T.Wang; Bulbophyllum sundaicum J.J.Verm. & Schuit.

= Bulbophyllum depressum =

Species of orchid

Bulbophyllum depressum is a species of orchid in the family Orchidaceae.
