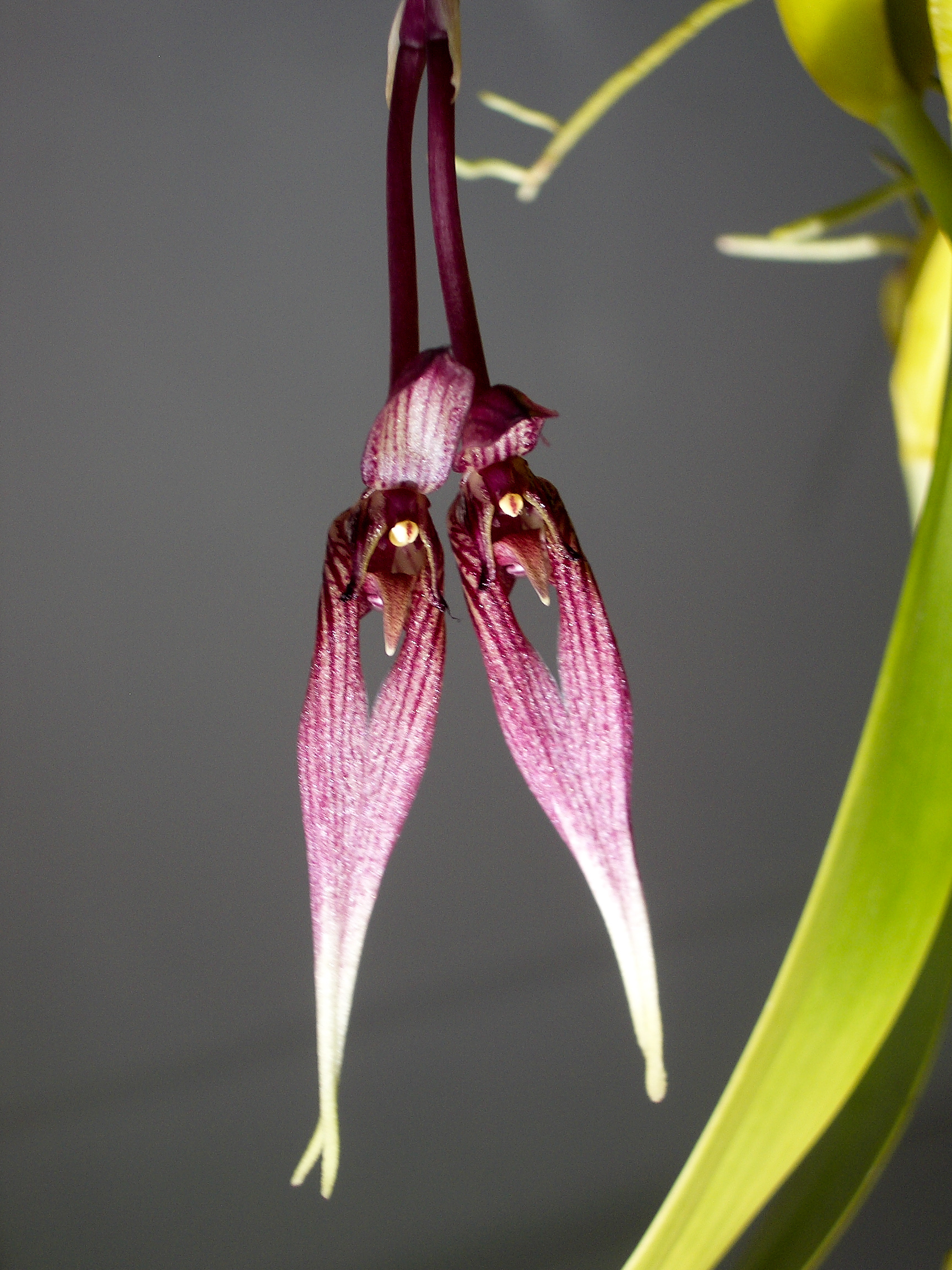

Scientific classification
- Kingdom: Plantae
- Clade: Tracheophytes
- Clade: Angiosperms
- Clade: Monocots
- Order: Asparagales
- Family: Orchidaceae
- Subfamily: Epidendroideae
- Genus: Bulbophyllum
- Species: B. biflorum

Binomial name
- Bulbophyllum biflorum Teijsm. & Binn. (1855)

Synonyms
- Phyllorkis biflora (Teijsm. & Binn.) Kuntze (1891); Cirrhopetalum biflorum (Teijsm. & Binn.) J.J.Sm. (1903); Bulbophyllum geminatum Carr (1929)

= Bulbophyllum biflorum =

Two-flowered bulbophyllum

Species of orchid from Southeast Asia

Bulbophyllum biflorum (two-flowered bulbophyllum) is a species of orchid. This species is found in southern Thailand, the Malay Peninsula, Sumatra, Java, Bali, and eastward to Wallace's Line. The inflorescence consists of exactly two flowers. The flower size is 7.5 cm long. According to Fayaz, each flower displays at least five colours; white, greenish-yellow, dark red spots, and yellowish-brown lip with purple spots.
