= Charles Storer (painter) =

American painter

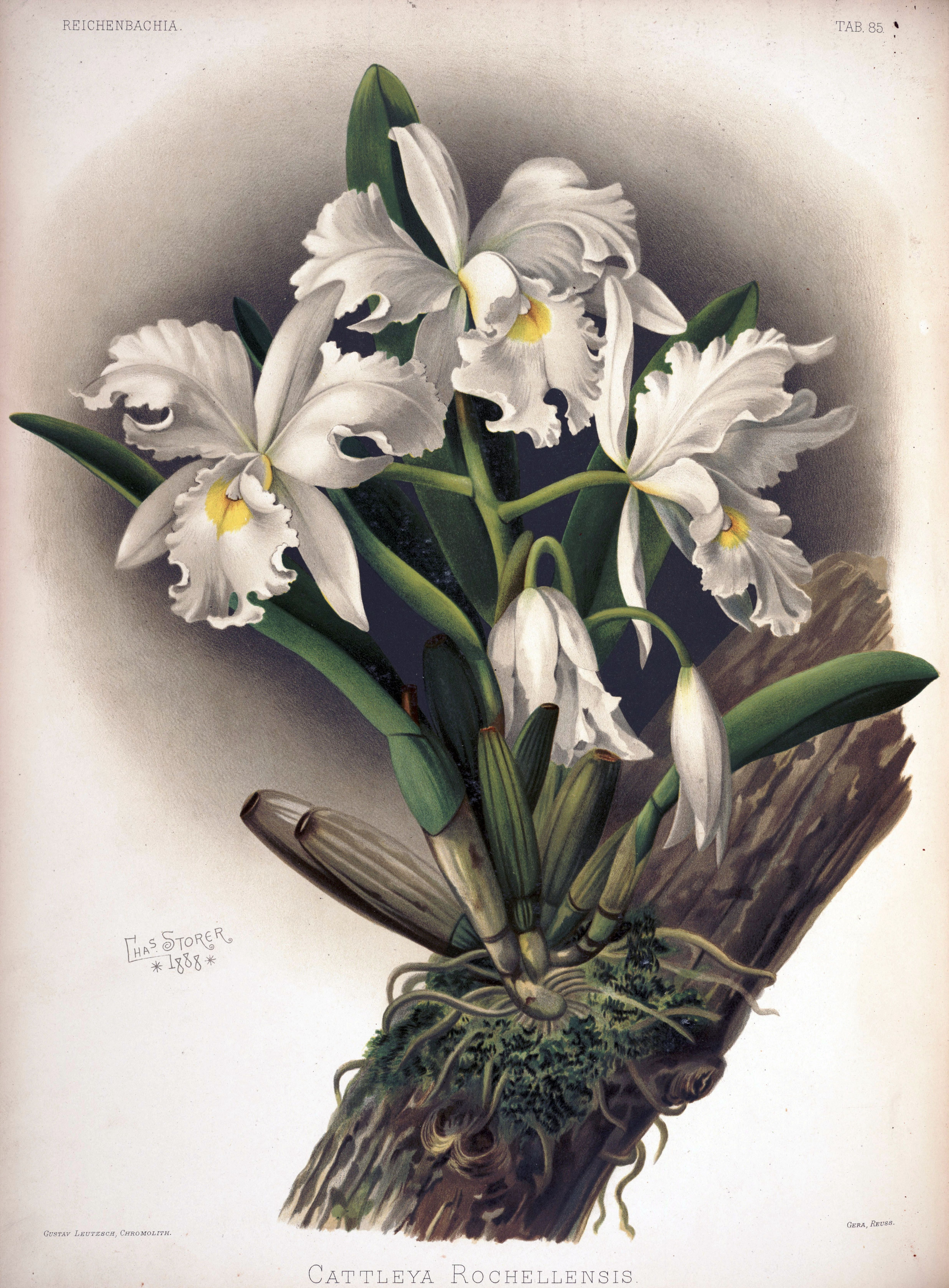
Storer's Cattleya warscewiczii in Reichenbachia: Orchids Illustrated and Described

Charles Storer (1817, Boston – 1907) was an American painter, best known for his finely detailed drawings of Orchideae and regarded as one of the most prominent floral painters of New England. Other than flowers, he was also renowned for landscapes and still-life paintings.

== Life ==
Born to a wealthy Boston family, Storer was a drafter who got into both art and orchids in his 60s. In the 1880s he was studying orchids at Langwater farm and Ames family estate collection. At 1883 he made his art debut, exhibiting at the National Academy of Design. In the years 1895-1904 he was a member of the Boston Art Club. By 1895, Storer had moved to Providence, Rhode Island, where he had his studio in the downtown Conrad Building. September 1904 article in the Orchid Review states Storer provided them with a "handsome" painting of Paphiopedilum x rolfei from J.E. Rockwell collection. The article also mentioned that Storer had been studying orchids for over twenty-five years. He contributed a painting of Cattleya warscewiczii sub. var. rochellensis to Reichenbachia: Orchids Illustrated and Described.

A lot of Storer's orchid watercolors found themself in Oakes Ames’ personal collection of orchid paintings (other works there were by the botanist himself, his wife Blanche, J.L. Macfarlane, Putzys, and several unidentified artists). The genera represented in the Ames collection are Cypripedium, Cattleya, and Selenipedium. This collection was gifted to the Massachusetts Horticultural Society by Ames.

== Gallery ==
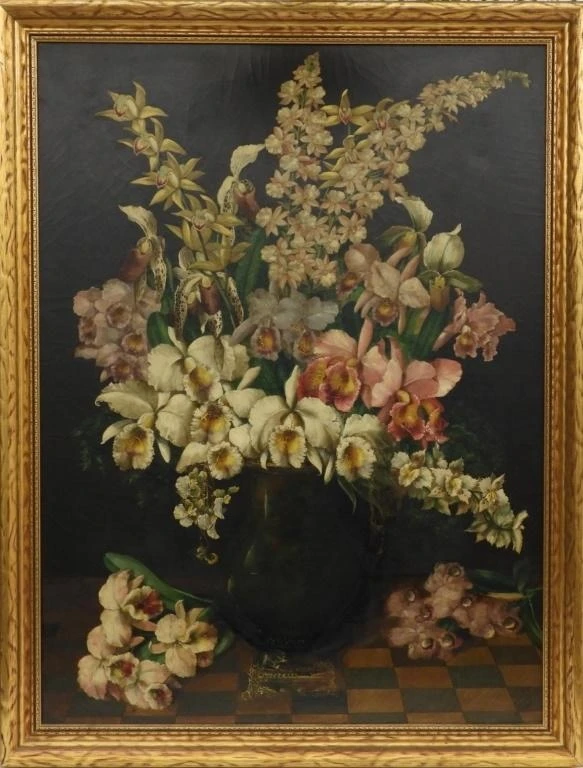
Still Life of Orchids in an Urn

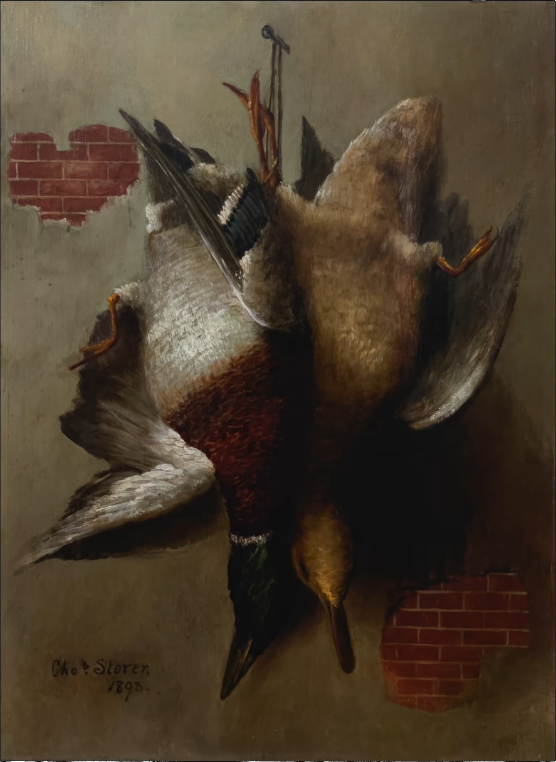
Still Life with Game Bird

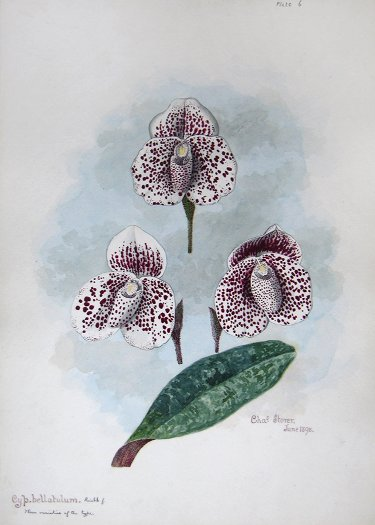
Cypripedium bellatulum
