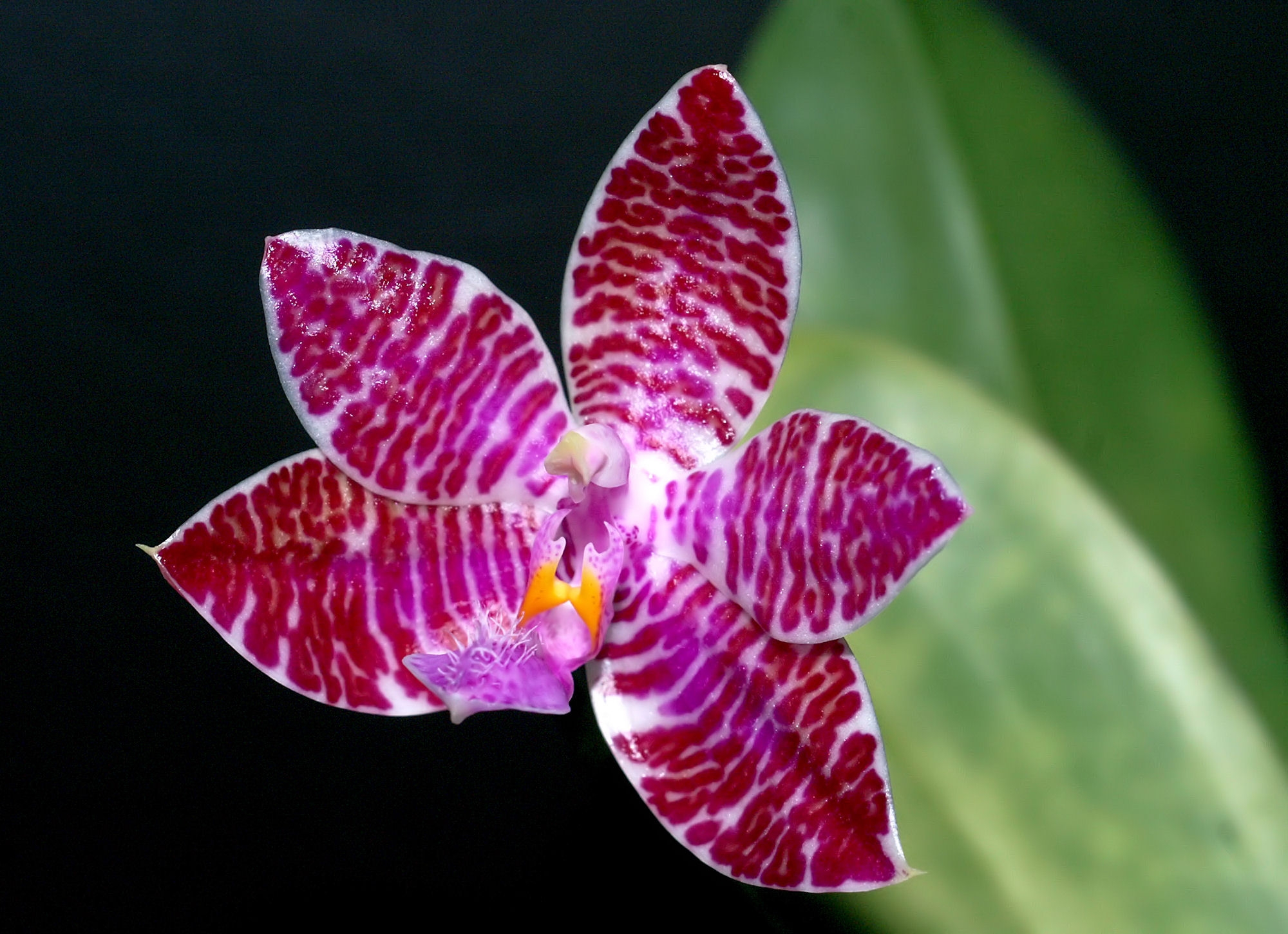
- Flower of Phalaenopsis lueddemanniana

Scientific classification
- Kingdom: Plantae
- Clade: Tracheophytes
- Clade: Angiosperms
- Clade: Monocots
- Order: Asparagales
- Family: Orchidaceae
- Subfamily: Epidendroideae
- Genus: Phalaenopsis
- Species: P. lueddemanniana

Binomial name
- Phalaenopsis lueddemanniana Rchb.f.

Synonyms
- Phalaenopsis lueddemanniana var. delicata Rchb.f.; Phalaenopsis lueddemanniana var. ochrata Rchb.f.; Phalaenopsis lueddemannii Náves; Polychilos lueddemanniana (Rchb.f.) Shim; Phalaenopsis lueddemanniana var. ochracea Rchb.f.; Phalaenopsis ochracea (Rchb.f) Carrière ex Stein; Polychilos lueddemanniana (Rchb.f.) Shim

= Phalaenopsis lueddemanniana =

Species of orchid

Phalaenopsis lueddemanniana is a species of orchid endemic to the Philippines.
