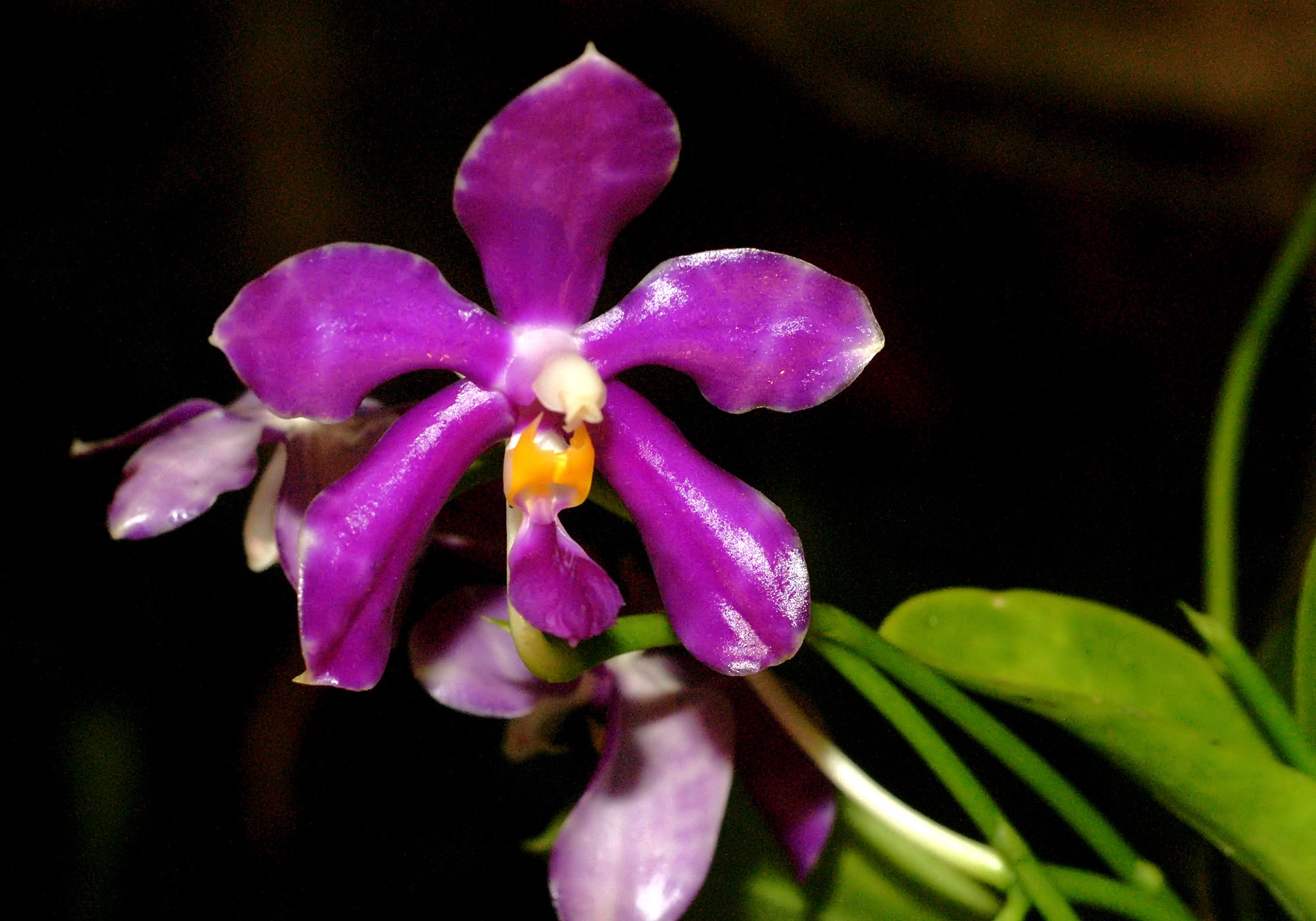
- Flower of Phalaenopsis pulchra

Scientific classification
- Kingdom: Plantae
- Clade: Tracheophytes
- Clade: Angiosperms
- Clade: Monocots
- Order: Asparagales
- Family: Orchidaceae
- Subfamily: Epidendroideae
- Genus: Phalaenopsis
- Species: P. pulchra

Binomial name
- Phalaenopsis pulchra (Rchb. f.) H.R. Sweet 1968

Synonyms
- Phalaenopsis lueddemanniana var. pulchra Rchb. f. 1875; Phalaenopsis lueddemmannia var purpurea Ames & Quis. 1932; Polychilos pulchra (Rchb. f.) Shim 1982

= Phalaenopsis pulchra =

Species of orchid

Phalaenopsis pulchra is an endemic species of orchid from the Philippines.
