= Oakes Ames (botanist) =

American biologist (1874–1950)

- Born: September 26, 1874; Massachusetts, US
- Died: April 28, 1950 (aged 75); Ormond Beach, Florida, US
- Education: Harvard University
- Spouse: Blanche Ames Ames
- Scientific career
- Fields: Botany
- Institutions: Harvard University
- Author abbrev. (botany): Ames

Oakes Ames (/eɪmz/; September 26, 1874 – April 28, 1950) was an American biologist specializing in orchids. His estate is now the Borderland State Park in Massachusetts. He was the son of Governor of Massachusetts Oliver Ames and grandson of Congressman Oakes Ames.

== Life and career ==
Ames was born into a wealthy family from North Easton, Massachusetts, the youngest son of Anna Coffin Ray and Governor Oliver Ames. At age fifteen, he collected his first orchids in Easton. He was educated at Harvard University, receiving his A.B. in Biology in 1898 and his A.M. in 1899 in Botany. He married Blanche Ames (no relation) in 1900, resulting in her married name of Blanche Ames Ames. Ames Ames was an American artist, political activist, inventor, writer, and prominent supporter of women's suffrage and birth control.

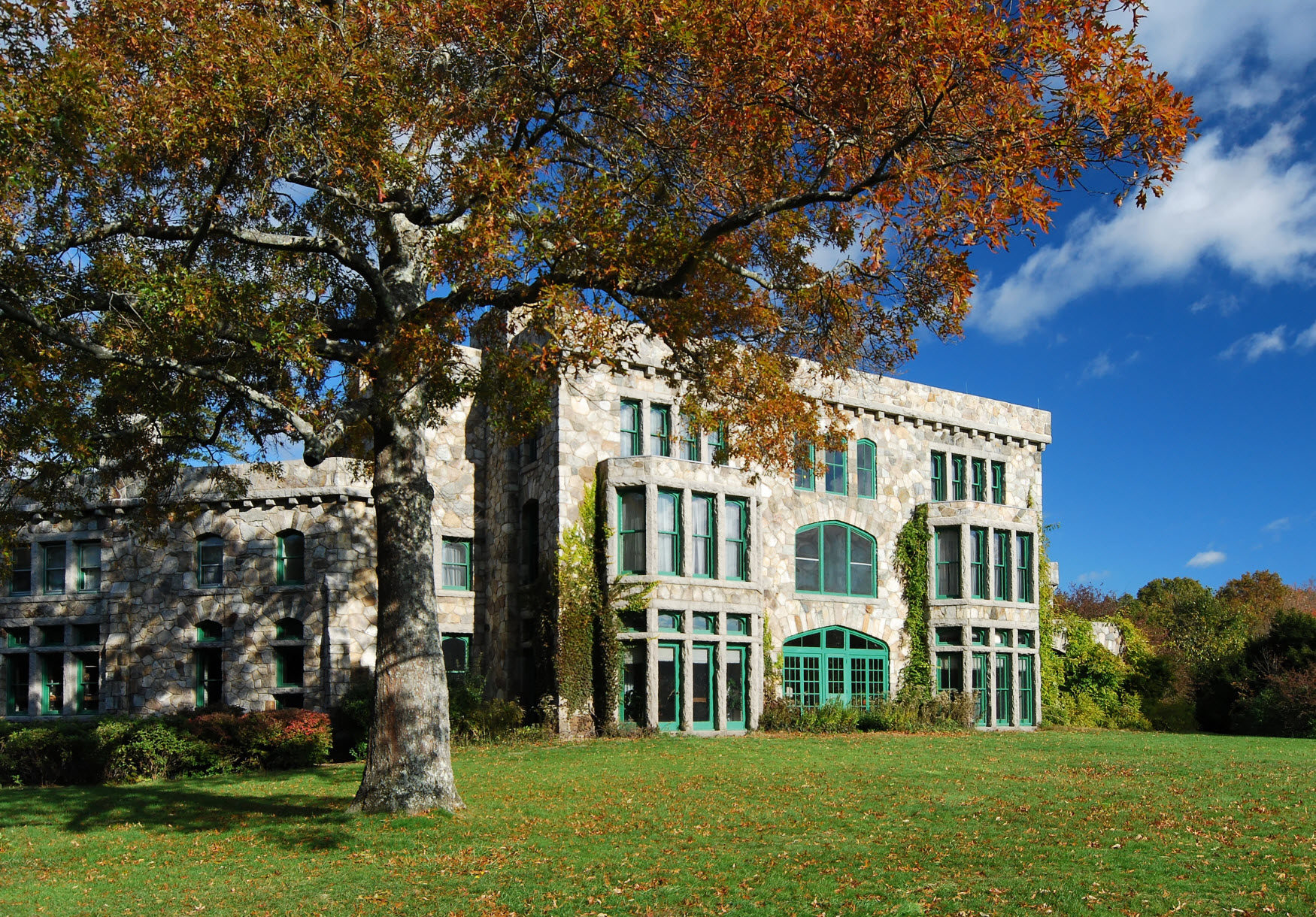
The Oakes Ames estate is now Borderland State Park

Ames spent his entire professional career at Harvard. As administrator, he was assistant director (1899–1909) and Director of the Botanic Garden (1909–1922); Curator (1923–1927), Supervisor (1927–1937), Director (1937–1945), and associate director of the Botanic Museum (1945–1950); Chairman of the Division of Biology (1926–1935) and Chairman of the Council of Botanical Collections and Supervisor of the Biological Laboratory, the Atkins Garden in Cuba, and the Arnold Arboretum (1927–1935). As teacher, he was an instructor in botany (1900–1910), associate professor of botany (1915–1926), professor of botany (1926–1932) and Arnold professor of botany (1932–1935). From 1935 to 1941 he was a research professor of botany. He was elected a Fellow of the American Academy of Arts and Sciences in 1911.

The Orchidaceae were little-known before Ames' study and classification. He made expeditions to Florida, the Caribbean, the Philippines, and Central and South America, with his wife Blanche Ames Ames creating scientifically accurate drawings of the plants they cataloged. The Ames' work was published in the seven-volume Orchidaceae: Illustrations and Studies of the Family Orchidaceae. They also developed the Ames Charts, illustrating the phylogenetic relationships of the major useful plants, which are still used.

Ames most notable accomplishment is building an extensive orchid herbarium, with library, photographs, and paintings, which he gave to Harvard in 1938. Today the Orchid Herbarium of Oakes Ames contains about 131,000 specimens, plus 3,000 flowers in glycerine, 4,000 pickled specimens, and hundreds of line drawings. Its library includes about 5,000 books, reprints, and journals. Authors of the artwork and photographs include Blanche Ames, Oakes Ames, Dorothy O. Allen, Ruth Barton, Gordon Winston Dillon, Leslie Andrew Garay, J.G. Hall, James Laird Macfarlane, Dorothy H. Marsh, Henry Moon, Magdalena Peña de Sousa, Eleanor B. Phillips, Charles Schweinfurth, Elmer W. Smith, Charles Storer, and unknown artists. This orchid Herbarium would eventually be integrated into the larger Harvard University Herbaria as Ames succeeded Professor George Lincoln Goodale as the director of Harvard's Botanical Museum (now the Harvard Museum of Natural History) in 1923.

=== The Glass Flowers ===
As the museum's second director, he oversaw the final stages of the creation of the famous Glass Flowers collection, exchanging a letter with the patron sponsor of the enterprise, Miss Mary Lee Ware during her second trip to Dresden, Germany in 1908 visiting Rudolf Blaschka, one of the Flowers' makers. This missive to Professor Ames was published on January 9, 1961, by the Harvard University Herbaria - Botanical Museum Leaflets, Harvard University Vol. 19, No. 6 - under the title "How Were The Glass Flowers Made?" and details some of Miss Ware's observations regarding Rudolf. However, Prof. Ames was not as passionate regarding the project as Goodale had been, and began his tenure as Goodale's successor with a letter of grave concern to Mary Ware:

I enclose a letter just received from Mr. Blaschka. This letter disturbs my peace of mind to its depths. It is unnecessary for me to explain why. We have discussed the situation at length. I have thought again and again about our future relations with Mr. Blaschka. Perhaps I am stupid in being at a loss for a solution of the problem. I do not see how we can throw aside a man who has become so much a part of our scheme of things. Yet, how can we avoid the danger of allowing kindness to misguide us? I will go on thinking about possibilities.

Why exactly he was disturbed is unknown, but Ames found his solution in what he referred to as "Economic Botany", asking Rudolf Blaschka to make glass Olea europaea (Olive) and Vitis vinifera (Common Grape Vine), a request which Rudolf answered with alacrity and became a series of glass fruits in both rotting and edible condition. However, Prof. Ames continues to exchange letters with Miss Ware discussing the project, namely the quality and speed of production as Rudolf ages, discussions which on Ames' part vary from controlled excitement to continued concern regarding the project and Rudolf's continuing ability to produce in a satisfactory manner. That said, in 1924 he wrote to Miss Ware to note to great success of the Glass Flowers overall: "You ought to be very happy in the realization that your great gift is one of the outstanding attractions of the country. But Tom Barbour certainly looks a bit disgusted when visitors to the Agassiz Museum asks if the giraffe is made of glass."

== See also ==
- Ames family
