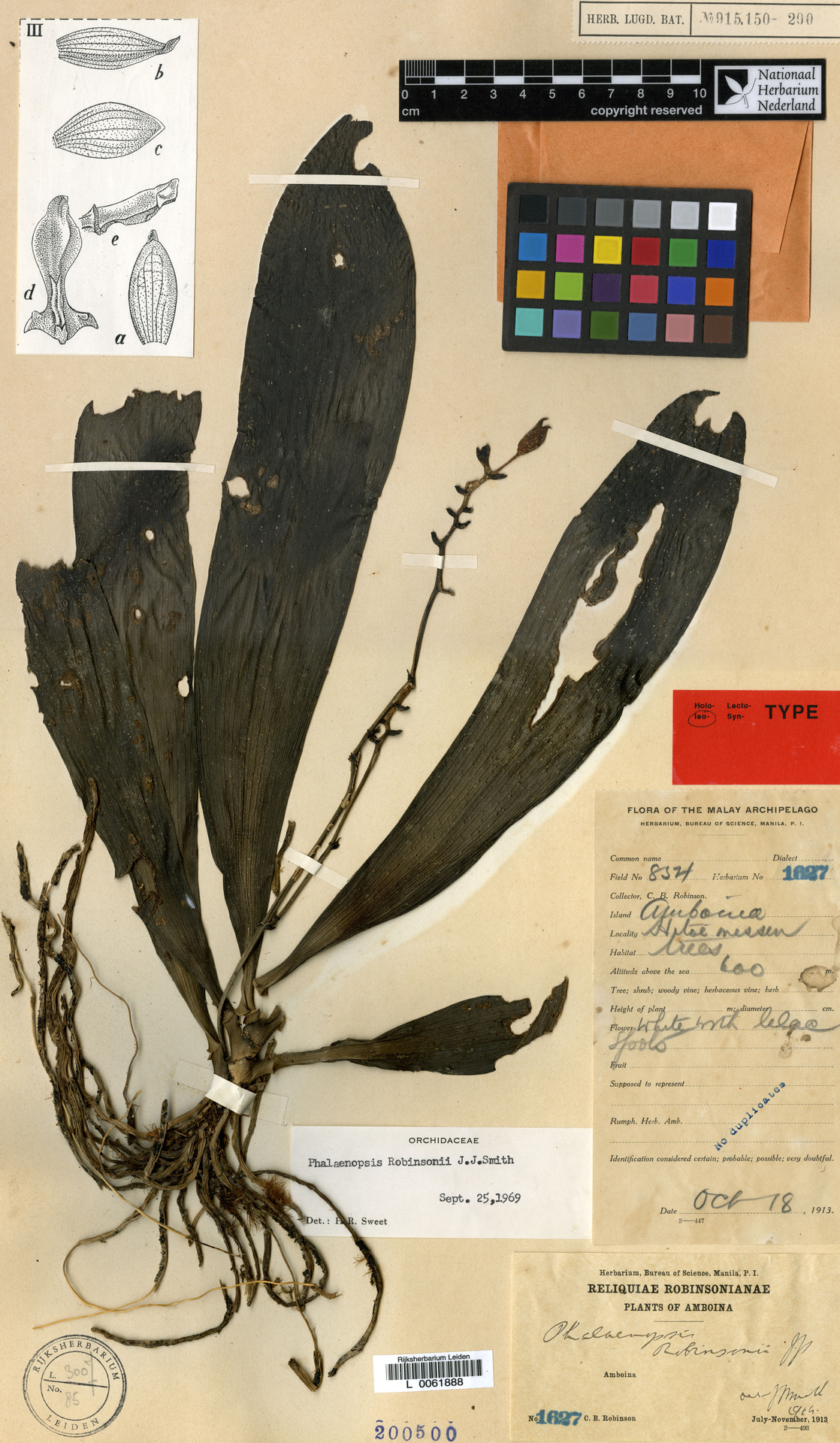
- holotype and only known specimen of Phalaenopsis robinsonii

Scientific classification
- Kingdom: Plantae
- Clade: Tracheophytes
- Clade: Angiosperms
- Clade: Monocots
- Order: Asparagales
- Family: Orchidaceae
- Subfamily: Epidendroideae
- Genus: Phalaenopsis
- Species: P. robinsonii

Binomial name
- Phalaenopsis robinsonii J.J.Sm.
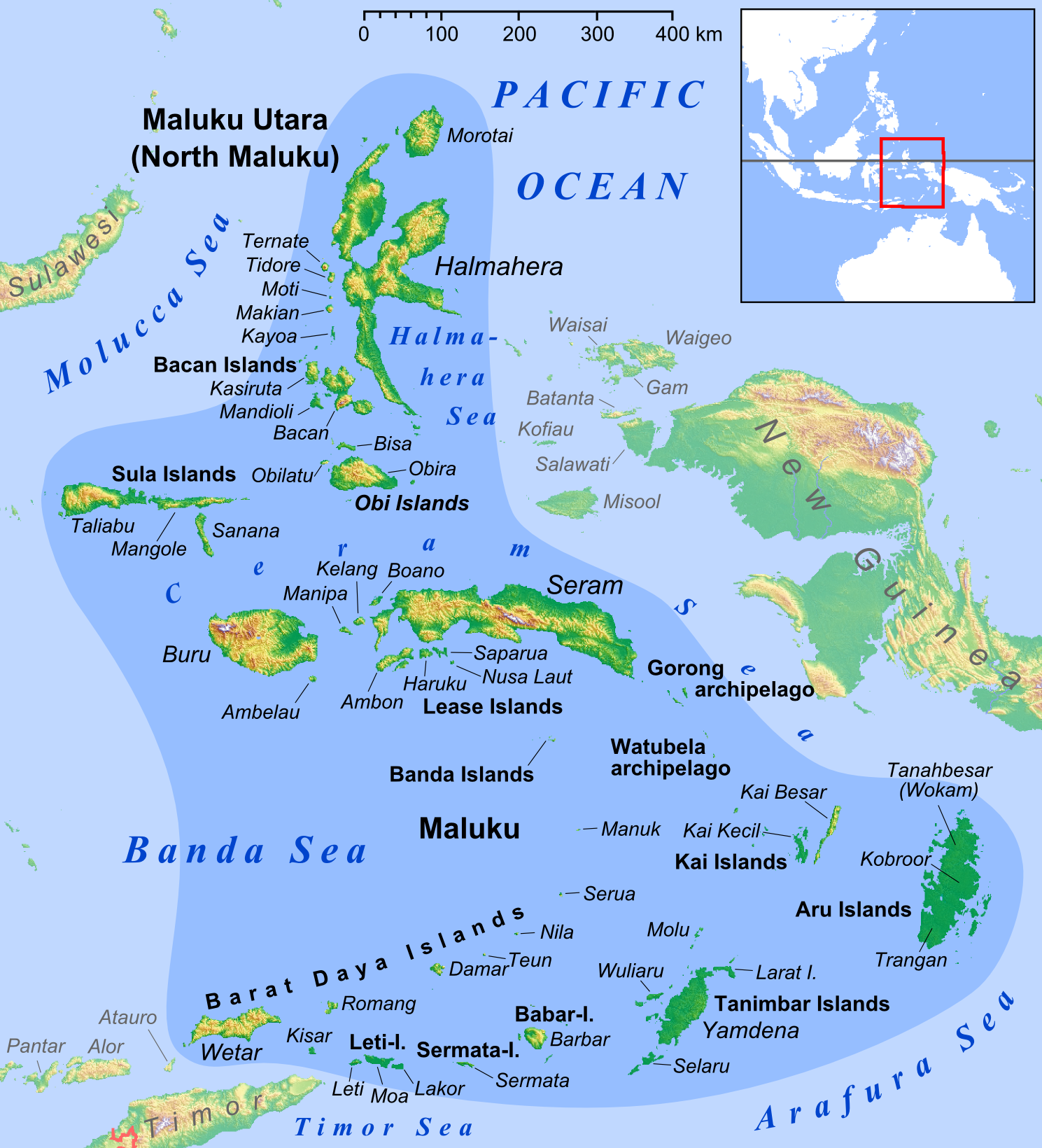
- distribution of Phalaenopsis robinsonii

Synonyms
- Polychilos robinsonii (J.J.Sm.) Shim

= Phalaenopsis robinsonii =

Species of epiphytic orchid

Phalaenopsis robinsonii is a species of orchid native to Maluku, Indonesia. The specific epithet robinsonii refers to the botanist and collector of the type specimen Charles Budd Robinson (1871-1913).

== Description ==
It is a pendulous epiphyte with 4–5, up to 31 cm long and 5.7 cm wide leaves. Fleshy, white flowers with lilac spots are produced on few-flowered, arching, branched or unbranched inflorescences. The lateral lobes of the labellum are unusually small.

== Taxonomy ==
This species is placed in the section Amboinenses of subgenus Polychilos. An affinity to Phalaenopsis amboinensis or Phalaenopsis modesta has been reported.
