= Phalaenopsis × lotubela =

Scientific classification
- Kingdom: Plantae
- Clade: Tracheophytes
- Clade: Angiosperms
- Clade: Monocots
- Order: Asparagales
- Family: Orchidaceae
- Subfamily: Epidendroideae
- Genus: Phalaenopsis
- Species: P. × lotubela

Binomial name
- Phalaenopsis × lotubela O.Gruss, Cavestro & G.Benk
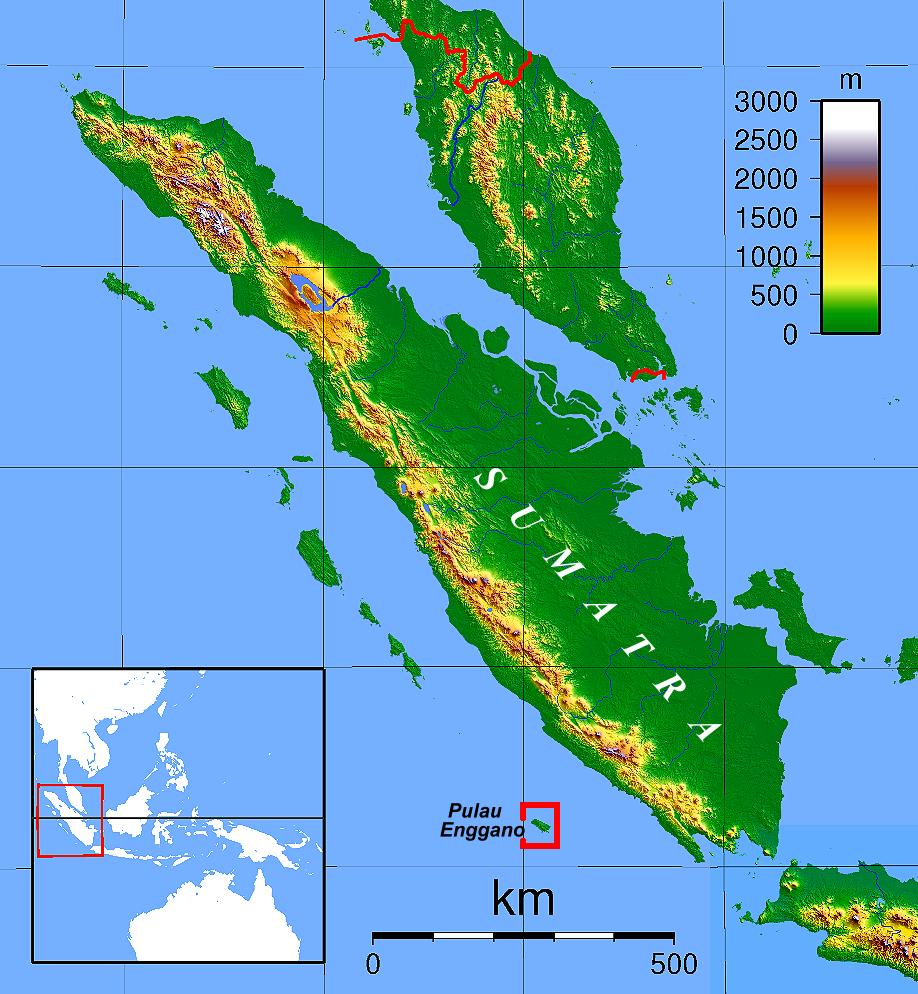
- Distribution of Phalaenopsis × lotubela

Species of orchid

Phalaenopsis × lotubela is a species of epiphytic orchid native to the island Sumatra of Indonesia. It is a hybrid of Phalaenopsis cornu-cervi and Phalaenopsis javanica.

== Discovery ==
This species was first noticed to be distinct in 2018 by Gus Benk, who had found it among other Phalaenopsis species, such as Phalaenopsis cornu-cervi, Phalaenopsis javanica and Phalaenopsis fimbriata. It had previously been known by local people.

== Etymology ==
The specific epithet lotubela is derived from the name, which local people call this species. It refers to the hill, where it was found.

== Description ==
Phalaenopsis × lotubela is an epiphytic plant with 5–7, 12–20 cm long and 6–9 cm wide leaves. The pendent, 14–18 cm long inflorescence bears 5–10, sequentially opening, 3-3.5 cm wide flowers with a yellow ground colour and reddish brown transverse barring. The sepals have acute tips. The labellum, which bears white trichomes, is 1 cm long and 0.5 cm wide.
