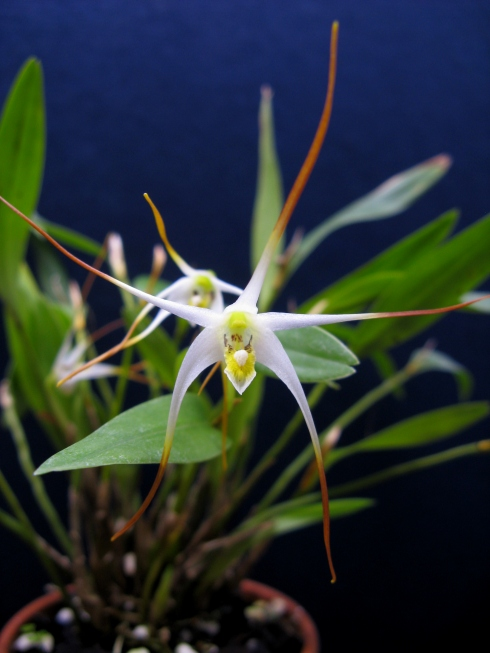

Scientific classification
- Kingdom: Plantae
- Clade: Tracheophytes
- Clade: Angiosperms
- Clade: Monocots
- Order: Asparagales
- Family: Orchidaceae
- Subfamily: Epidendroideae
- Genus: Dendrobium
- Species: D. validicolle

Binomial name
- Dendrobium validicolle J.J.Sm.

Synonyms
- Diplocaulobium validicolle (J.J.Sm.) Kraenzl.

= Dendrobium validicolle =

Strong-stemmed diplocaulobium

Species of orchid

Dendrobium validicolle is a species of orchid. Its common name is the strong-stemmed diplocaulobium.

It is found in New Guinea in lowland forests as a small to medium-sized, intermediate to hot growing epiphyte. The plants are crowded with oblong pseudobulbs carrying a single erect leaf. Blooms appear on a single inflorescence arising through a 5–10 mm long sheath. The flowers are 6 to 7 cm in diameter.

The plants are cultivated in intermediate to warm conditions mounted on cork slabs or in small pots with medium bark and need high humidity. No specific winter rest is needed. The plants can flower all year, but tend to get a flush of flowers in spring and autumn, where many flowers appear at once. The odd single flower can appear all year. What is extraordinary is that the plants only flower for a few hours, and that the inflorescences take only a few days from peeking through the sheath to flowering. This makes it hard to see plants flowering.
