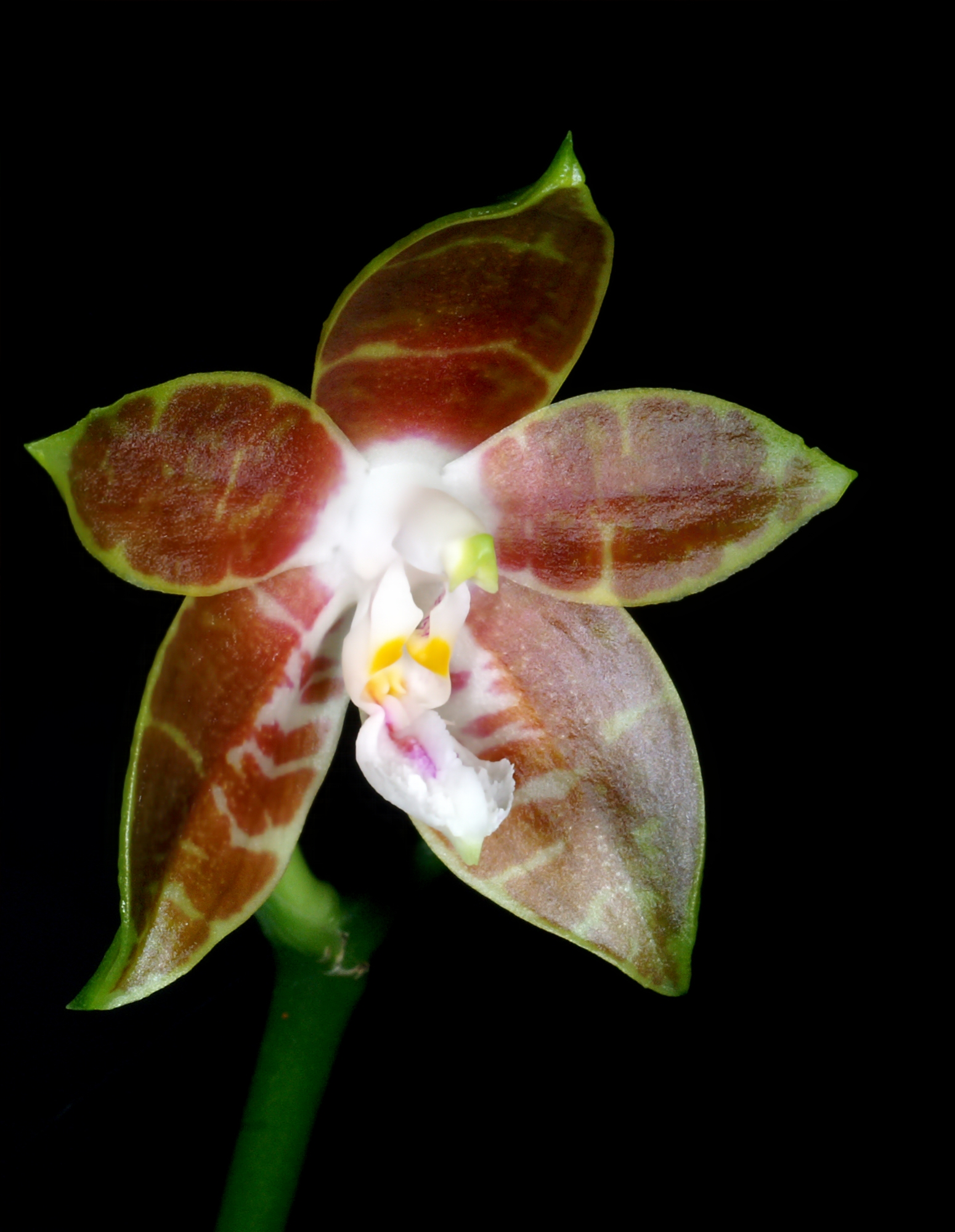
- Flower detail
- CITES Appendix II (CITES)

Scientific classification
- Kingdom: Plantae
- Clade: Tracheophytes
- Clade: Angiosperms
- Clade: Monocots
- Order: Asparagales
- Family: Orchidaceae
- Subfamily: Epidendroideae
- Genus: Phalaenopsis
- Species: P. venosa

Binomial name
- Phalaenopsis venosa Shim & Fowlie
- Distribution of Phalaenopsis venosa

Synonyms
- Polychilos venosa Shim ex Fowlie

= Phalaenopsis venosa =

Species of orchid

Phalaenopsis venosa, is a species of orchid endemic to Sulawesi, Indonesia. The specific epithet venosa, from the Latin venosus meaning veiny, refers to the floral colouration.

== Description ==
The plants usually have 3-5 10–20 cm long and 5–7.5 cm wide leaves. The 4–5 cm wide flowers with a light green anther cap are produced on erect, branched or unbranched inflorescences with a flattened rhachis. Mature specimens can produce several inflorescences at once. The base of the oblong-elliptic petals and sepals, as well as the column and the labellum is white. The ground colour of the greenish-yellow petals and sepals is almost concealed by brown colouration and transverse barring, although veins of the ground colour remain visible, which are reflected in the species name. The floral fragrance has been reported to be unpleasant. The diploid chromosome count is 2n = 38. The karyotype is bimodal and thus small and larger chromosomes are present. Large heterochromatin blocks are present at the ends of the large metacentric or submetacentric chromosomes.

== Ecology ==
This species inhabits wet lowland forests at elevations of 450–1000 m above sea level.

== Taxonomy ==
It is placed within the section Amboinenses, as it is the sister species to Phalaenopsis amboinensis. It has a wider labellum than Phalaenopsis amboinensis.

== Conservation ==
It has been reported to be threatened to extinction. Endemic species of Sulawesi are threatened with conversion of habitats to housing areas, plantations, roads and through illegal logging.
