= Jan Constantijn Costerus =

Dutch biologist

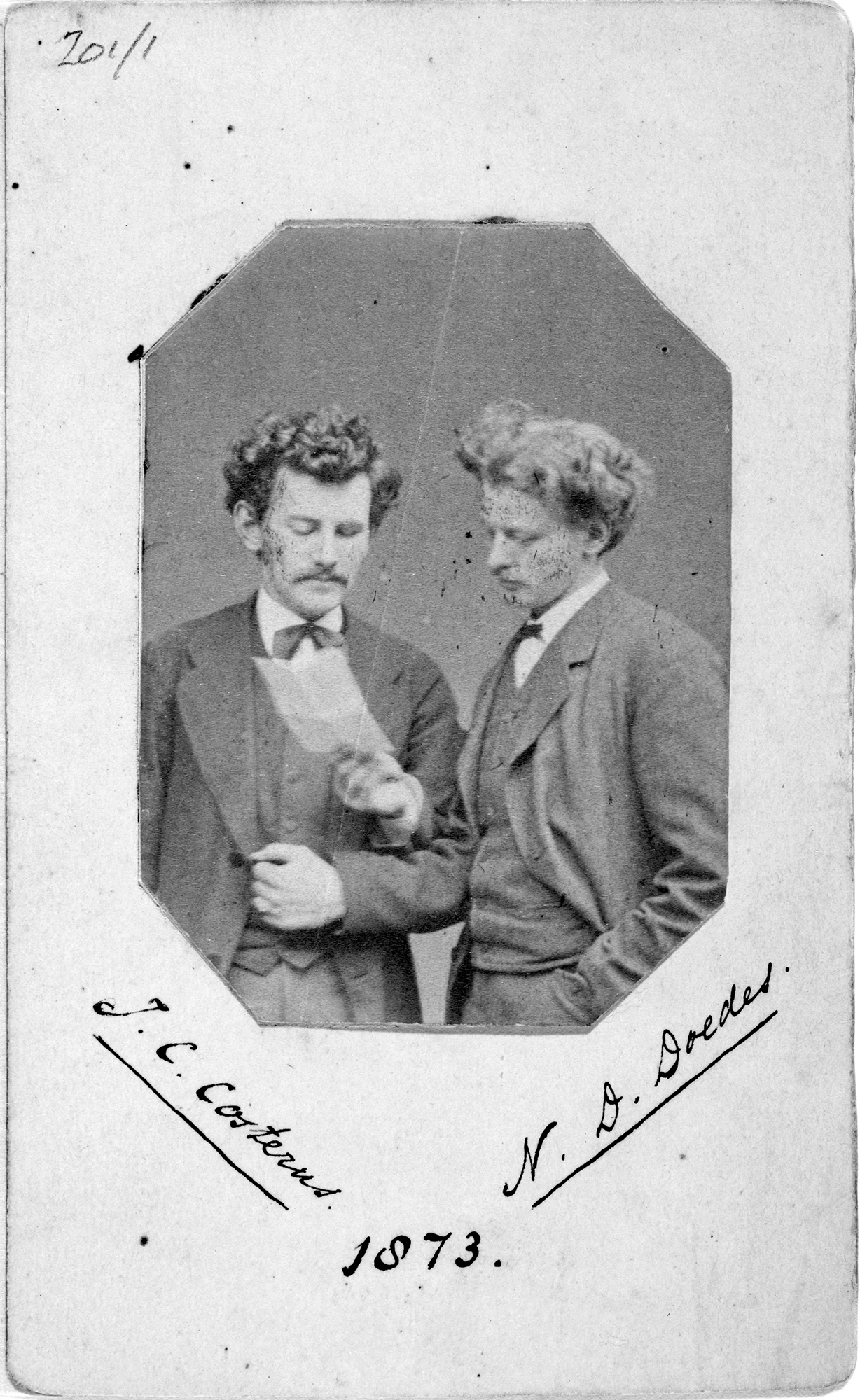
Costerus and Doedes admiring the letter they received from Charles Darwin, 1873. Photo from Darwin archives.

Jan Constantijn Costerus (29 March 1849 – 31 July 1938) was a Dutch biologist who specialized in teratology or studies on mutations in plants. A contemporary of Hugo de Vries, he also founded of a botanical garden in Hilversum. The plant genus Costera is named in his honour.

== Life and work ==
Costerus was born in Sneek to Pieter Jacob Costerus and Wilhelmina Jacoba Cornelia Teengs. His father was a school administrator. He went to study botany at the University of Utrecht. His doctoral thesis of 1875 was on the lenticels (Het wezen der lenticellen). While still a student he read a Dutch translation of Darwin's theory of natural selection. Costerus and his fellow student Nicolaas Dirk Doedes (1850–1906) wrote a letter to Darwin and received a reply. They were so thrilled that they took a photo of themselves reading Darwin's letter and sent it back in their next letter in March 1873. Darwin and Doedes had a discussion on belief in God and the position of science. Costerus studied plant variation. At the age of eleven Costerus lost an eye. Costerus became a biology teacher at the first HBS in Amsterdam becoming its director later. He wrote a botany textbook and was a passionate nature enthusiast. One of his students was Joannes Jacobus Smith with whom he continued to collaborate in botany with Smith working on plants in Dutch Java. After Costerus retired, he moved to Hilversum in 1920 where he established a garden next to the library. In this garden he wanted to introduce the public to wild plants of the Netherlands, many of which the public saw as "weeds". In 1929, the library moved, and a new garden was created at Zonnelaan. On his death in 1938 he bequeathed a sum of 1000 guilders to cover the maintenance of the garden to the Hilversum municipality. He was married to Anna Ringeling.
