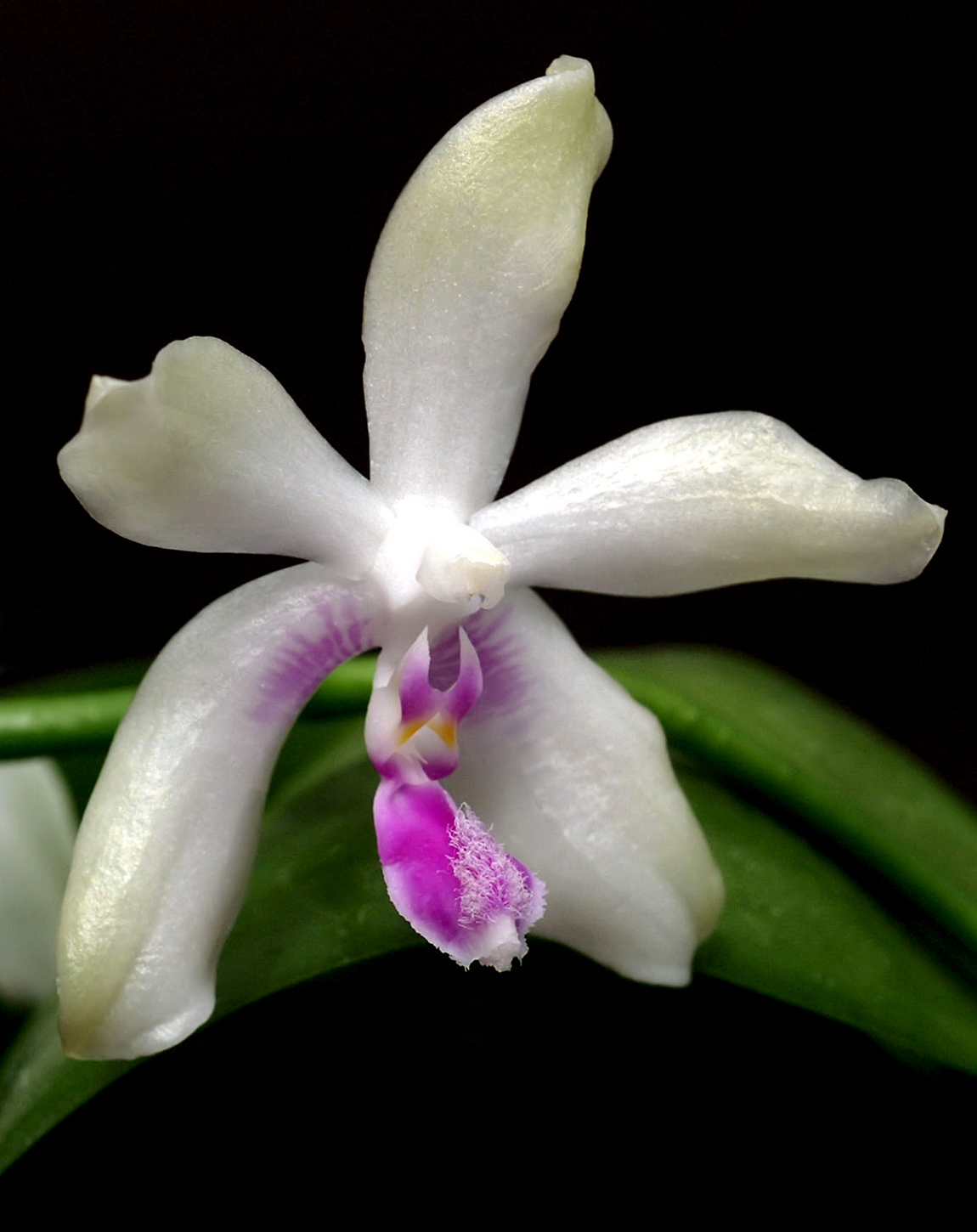
- Flower detail

Scientific classification
- Kingdom: Plantae
- Clade: Tracheophytes
- Clade: Angiosperms
- Clade: Monocots
- Order: Asparagales
- Family: Orchidaceae
- Subfamily: Epidendroideae
- Genus: Phalaenopsis
- Species: P. fimbriata

Binomial name
- Phalaenopsis fimbriata J.J.Sm.

Synonyms
- Phalaenopsis fimbriata f. alba O.Gruss & Roellke ex Christenson; Phalaenopsis fimbriata subsp. sumatrana (J.J.Sm.) Christenson; Phalaenopsis fimbriata var. tortilis O.Gruss & Roellke; Polychilos fimbriata (J.J.Sm.) Shim

= Phalaenopsis fimbriata =

Species of epiphytic orchid

Phalaenopsis fimbriata is a species of orchid native to Borneo, Java and Sumatra.

== Description ==
This species is a monopodial, epiphytic orchid with very short stems, which are covered by leaf sheaths. The thin, lanceolate to slightly oval leaves with an uneven surface are 14-23 cm long and 4-7 cm wide. The white to greenish yellow flowers are 2.5-3.5 cm wide. The labellum is 1.4-1.6 cm long and 0.6-0.8 cm wide. At its apex it is covered in trichomes, which is reflected in the specific epithet fimbriata meaning tufted. Flowering occurs from May to November. Per inflorescence 3-6 flowers open simultaneously and the anthesis lasts 2-3 weeks. This species is found in moist, primary lowland forests at altitudes of 400 m above sea level.

== Taxonomy ==
This species has been confused with Phalaenopsis tetraspis, from which it is distinguished through the absence of a hood over the anther bed. It is also similar to Phalaenopsis modesta, which has however a more glabrous labellum.

== Conservation ==
This species is protected unter the CITES appendix II regulations of international trade.
