= Phalaenopsis × valentinii =

Scientific classification
- Kingdom: Plantae
- Clade: Tracheophytes
- Clade: Angiosperms
- Clade: Monocots
- Order: Asparagales
- Family: Orchidaceae
- Subfamily: Epidendroideae
- Genus: Phalaenopsis
- Species: P. × valentinii

Binomial name
- Phalaenopsis × valentinii Rchb.f.
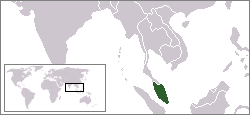
- Distribution of Phalaenopsis × valentinii

Synonyms
- Polychilos valentinii (Rchb.f.) Shim

Species of orchid

Phalaenopsis × valentinii is a species of orchid native to peninsular Malaysia. It is a natural hybrid of Phalaenopsis violacea and Phalaenopsis cornu-cervi.

== Taxonomy ==
It has been placed within the section Stauroglottis by Robert Allen Rolfe. Its hybrid nature was unknown in this placement.
