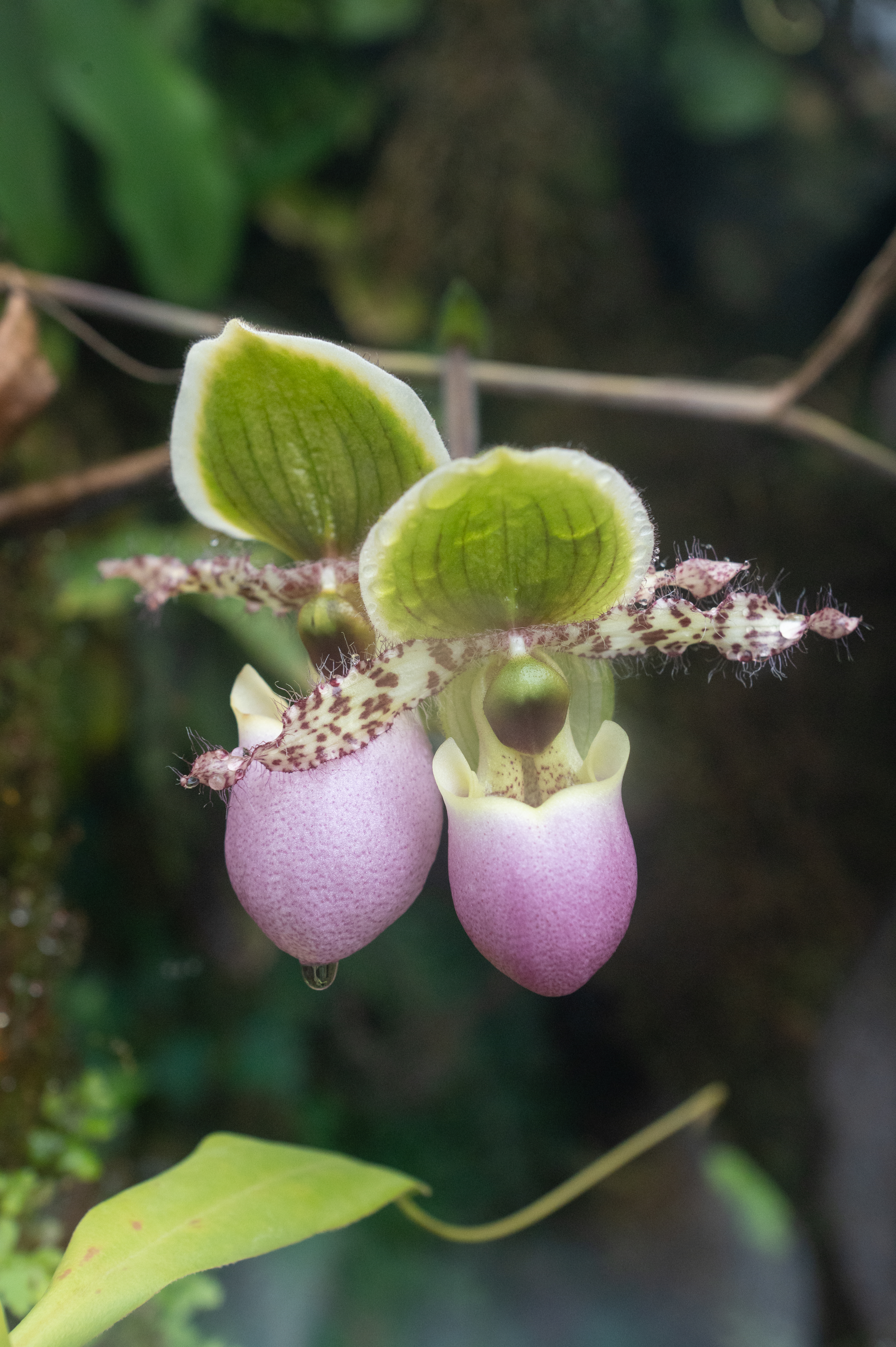

Conservation status
- Endangered (IUCN 3.1)

Scientific classification
- Kingdom: Plantae
- Clade: Embryophytes
- Clade: Tracheophytes
- Clade: Spermatophytes
- Clade: Angiosperms
- Clade: Monocots
- Order: Asparagales
- Family: Orchidaceae
- Subfamily: Cypripedioideae
- Genus: Paphiopedilum
- Species: P. glaucophyllum

Binomial name
- Paphiopedilum glaucophyllum J.J.Sm.

Synonyms
- Cypripedium glaucophyllum (J.J.Sm.) Mast.; Cordula glaucophylla (J.J.Sm.) Rolfe; Paphiopedilum victoria-regina ssp. glaucophyllum (J.J.Sm.) M.W.Wood

= Paphiopedilum glaucophyllum =

Species of orchid

Paphiopedilum glaucophyllum, common name shiny green leaf paphiopedilum or tropical lady's-slipper, is a species of flowering plant in the genus Paphiopedilum of the family Orchidaceae.

== Description ==
Paphiopedilum glaucophyllum is a terrestrial orchid 30–45 centimetres (12–18 in) tall. The leaves are waxy coated, clear blue-green, oblong-elliptic and narrow, about 30 centimetres (12 in) long. The flowers are about 8–11 centimetres (3.1–4.3 in) wide. The upper sepal is green and purple striped, the lateral petals are twisted, purple mottled and hairy, the labellum is white at the base, with a progressively increasing pink-purple dotting. The labellum reaches 4.5 centimetres (1.8 in) and its shape resembles a bag or women's shoes (hence the common name of Tropical Ladys-Slipper). This species blooms repeatedly with two flowers, producing a new one once the old one is fallen. The flowering period is very long, extending from the Spring till the Winter. This species is very similar to Paphiopedilum liemianum, but the last one has intense green leaves, while in the first one they are clearer.

== Distribution ==
This species is endemic to Southeast Asia (Indonesia, East and Southwest Java (Mount Semeru, Lumajang) and in Central Sumatra).

== Habitat ==
Paphiopedilum glaucophyllum has its natural habitat in rainy volcanic mountain slopes and moist limestone cliffs. It prefers sun to partial shade and calcareous soils with mosses, at an altitude of 200–700 metres (660–2,300 ft) above sea level.

== Gallery ==
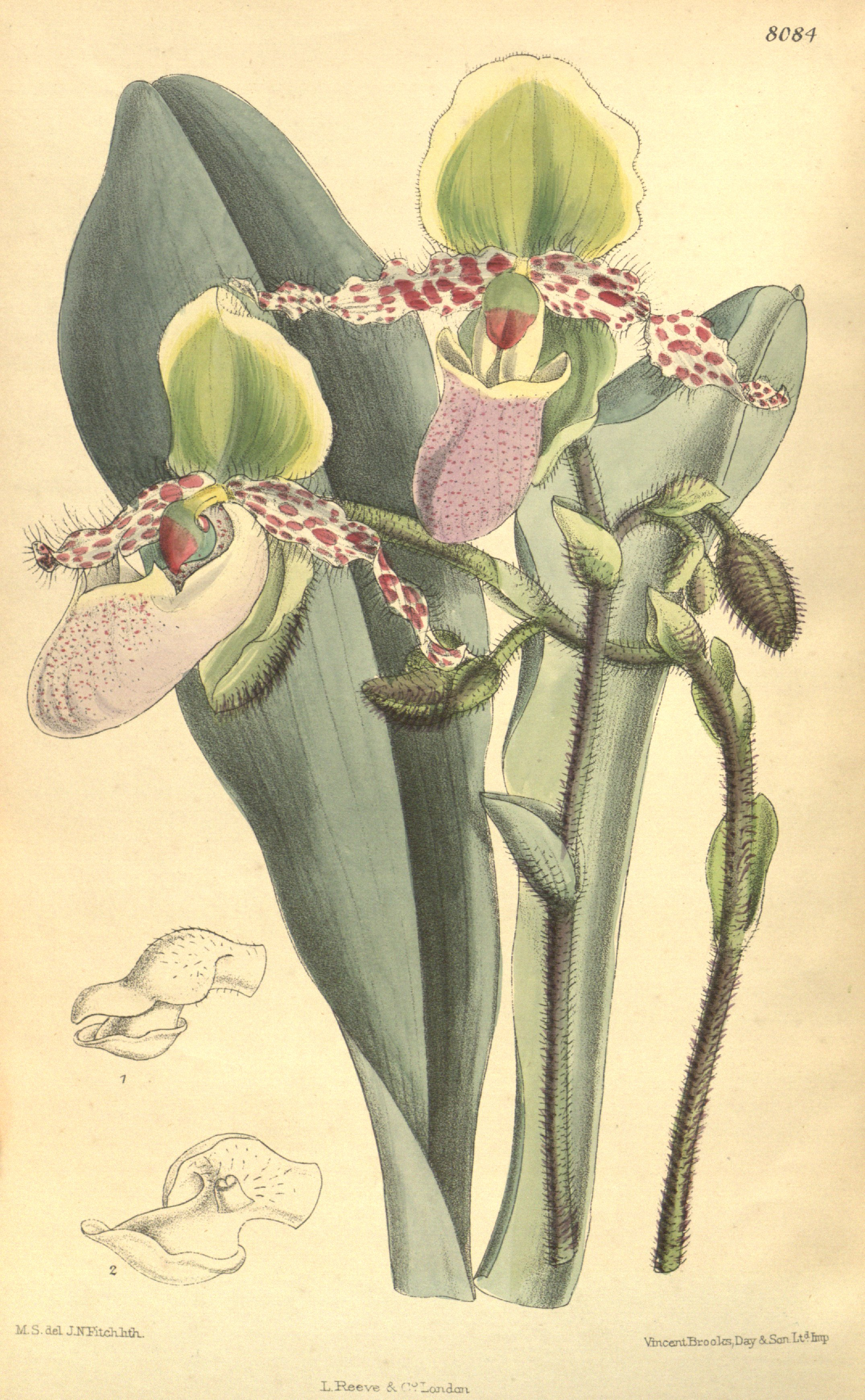
Illustration of Paphiopedilum glaucophyllum from "Curtis's Botanical Magazine" vol. 132 (Ser. 4 no. 2) tab. 8084, 1906

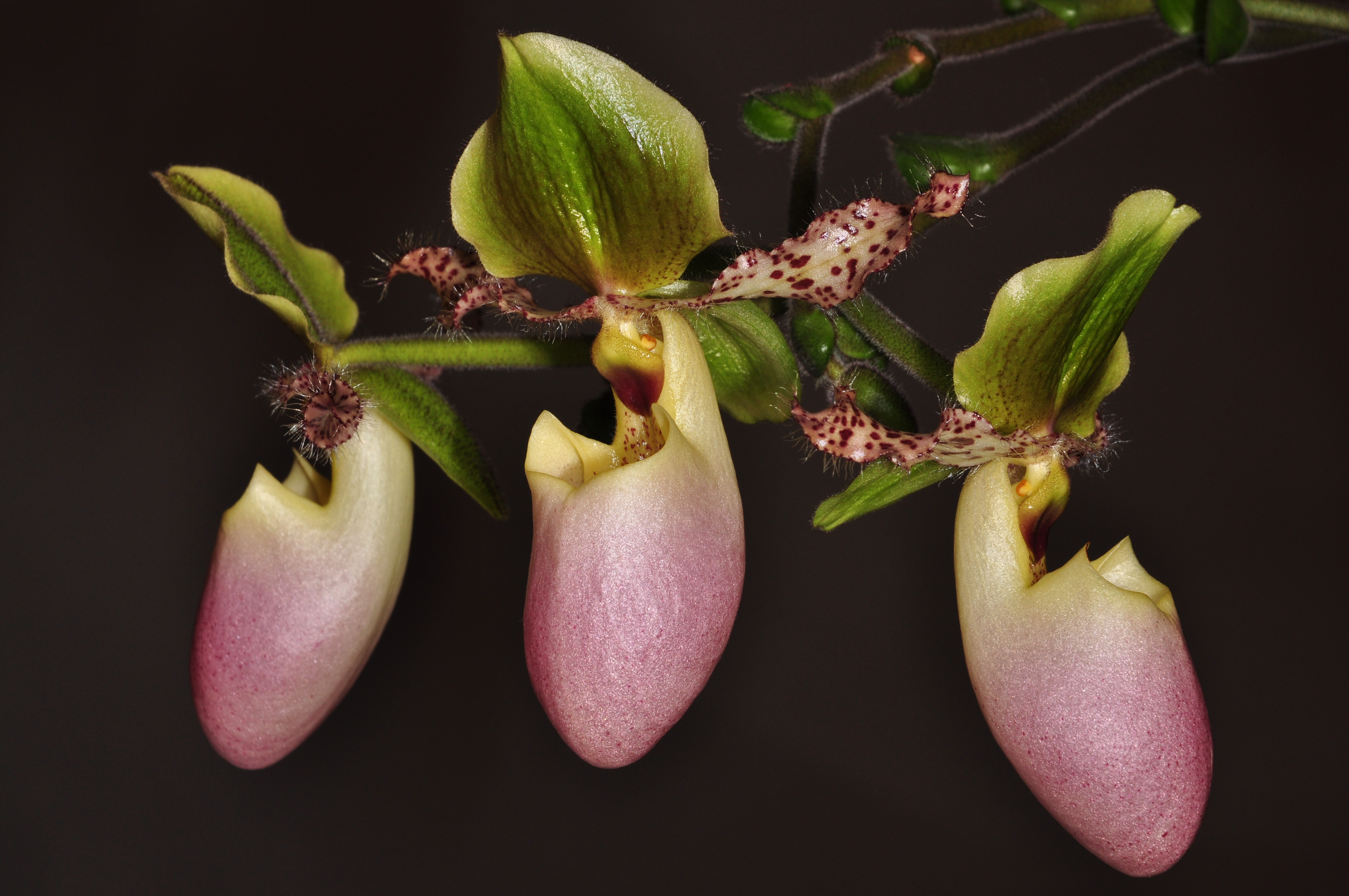
Flowers of Paphiopedilum glaucophyllum

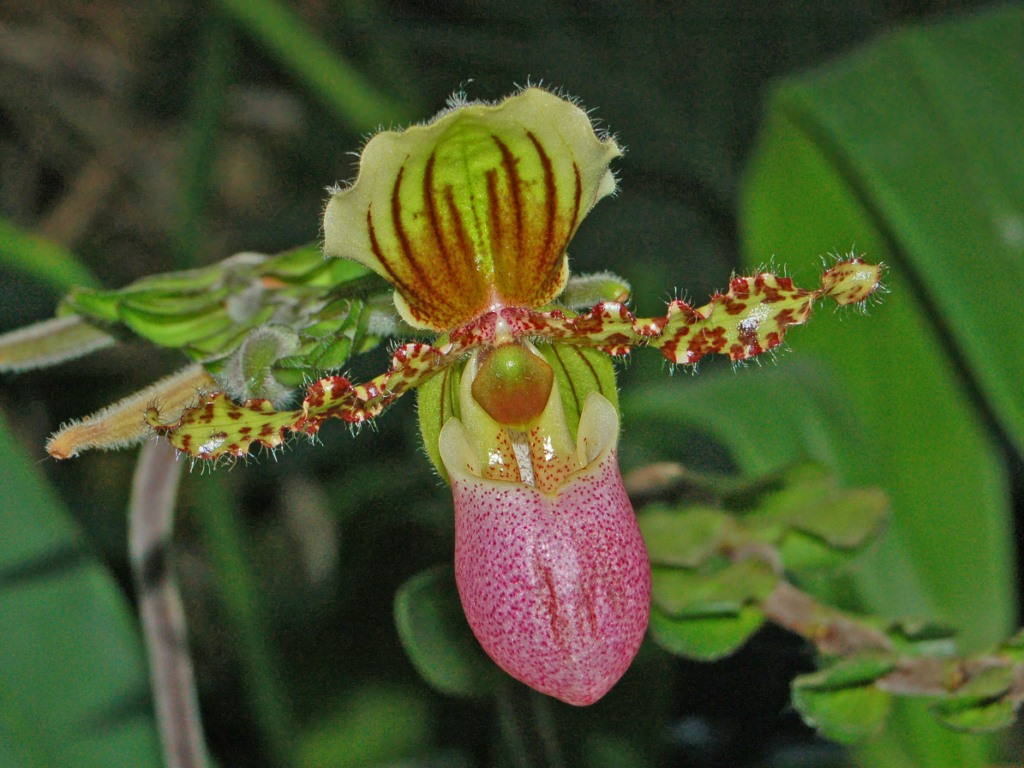
Flower of Paphiopedilum glaucophyllum

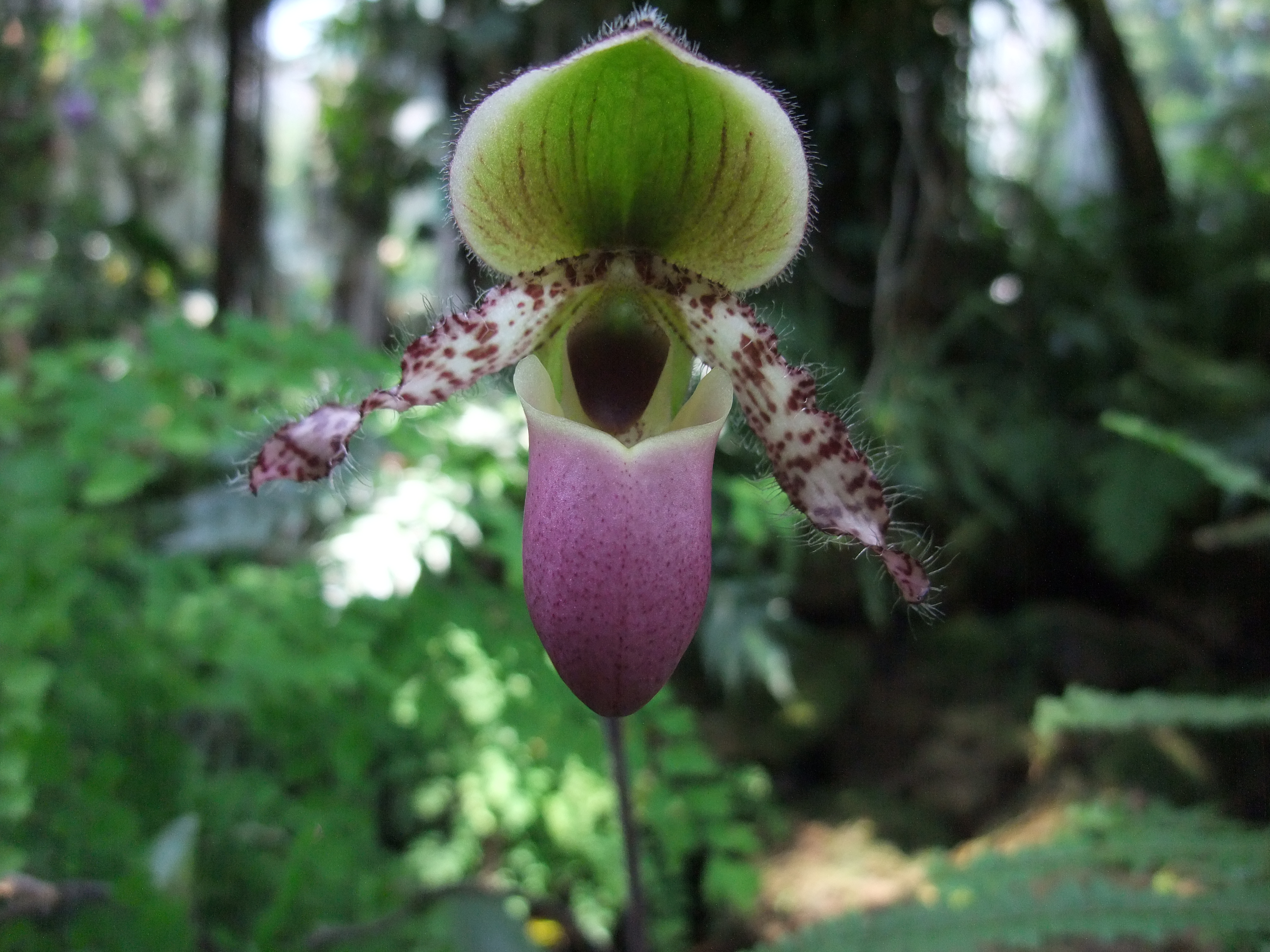
Flowers of Paphiopedilum glaucophyllum var. moquetteanum
