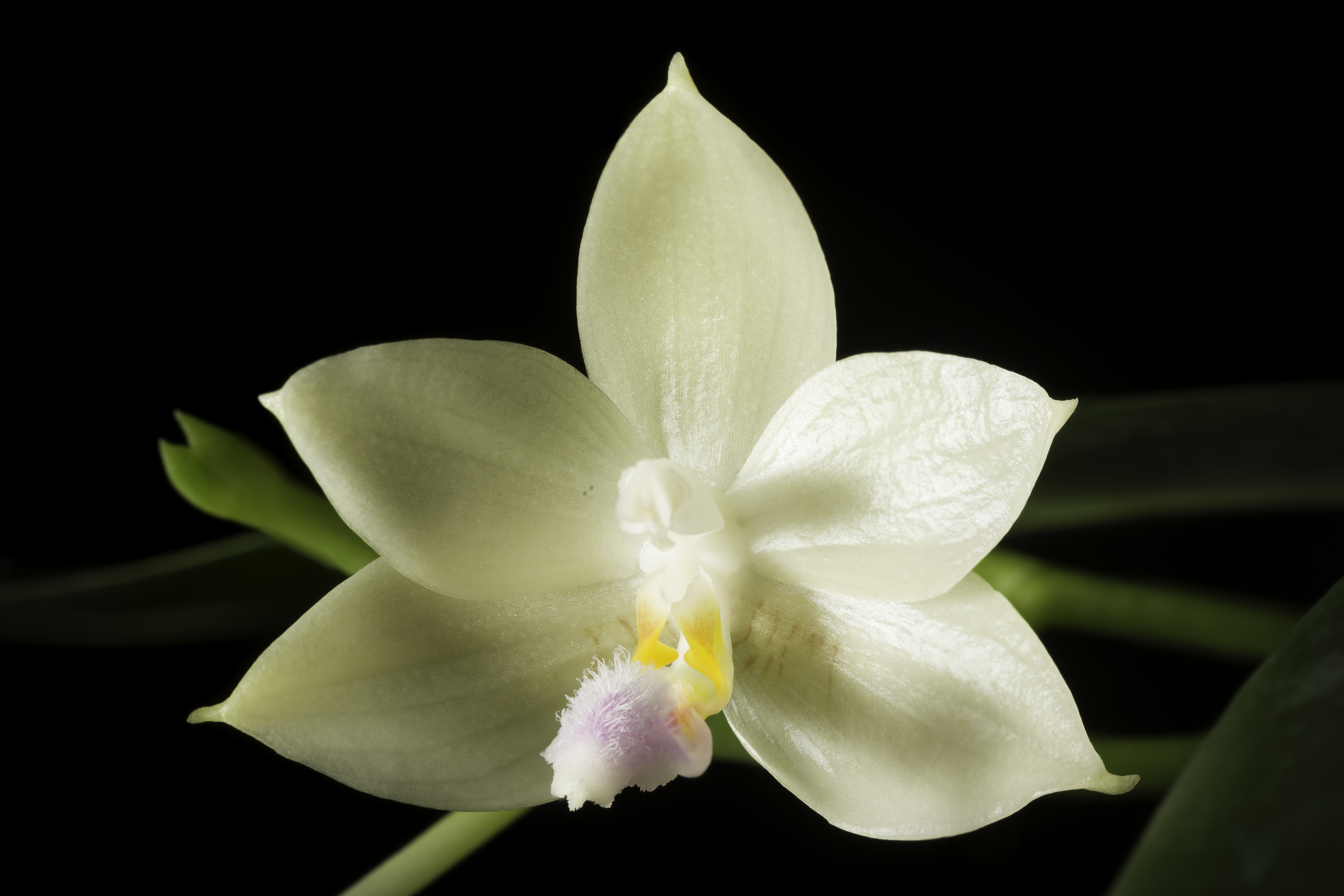
- flower detail

Scientific classification
- Kingdom: Plantae
- Clade: Tracheophytes
- Clade: Angiosperms
- Clade: Monocots
- Order: Asparagales
- Family: Orchidaceae
- Subfamily: Epidendroideae
- Genus: Phalaenopsis
- Species: P. floresensis

Binomial name
- Phalaenopsis floresensis Fowlie
- distribution of Phalaenopsis florensis

= Phalaenopsis floresensis =

Species of epiphytic orchid

Phalaenopsis floresensis is a species of orchid endemic to the Lesser Sunda Islands. This is referenced in the specific epithet floresensis, which refers to one of the Lesser Sunda Islands, Flores.

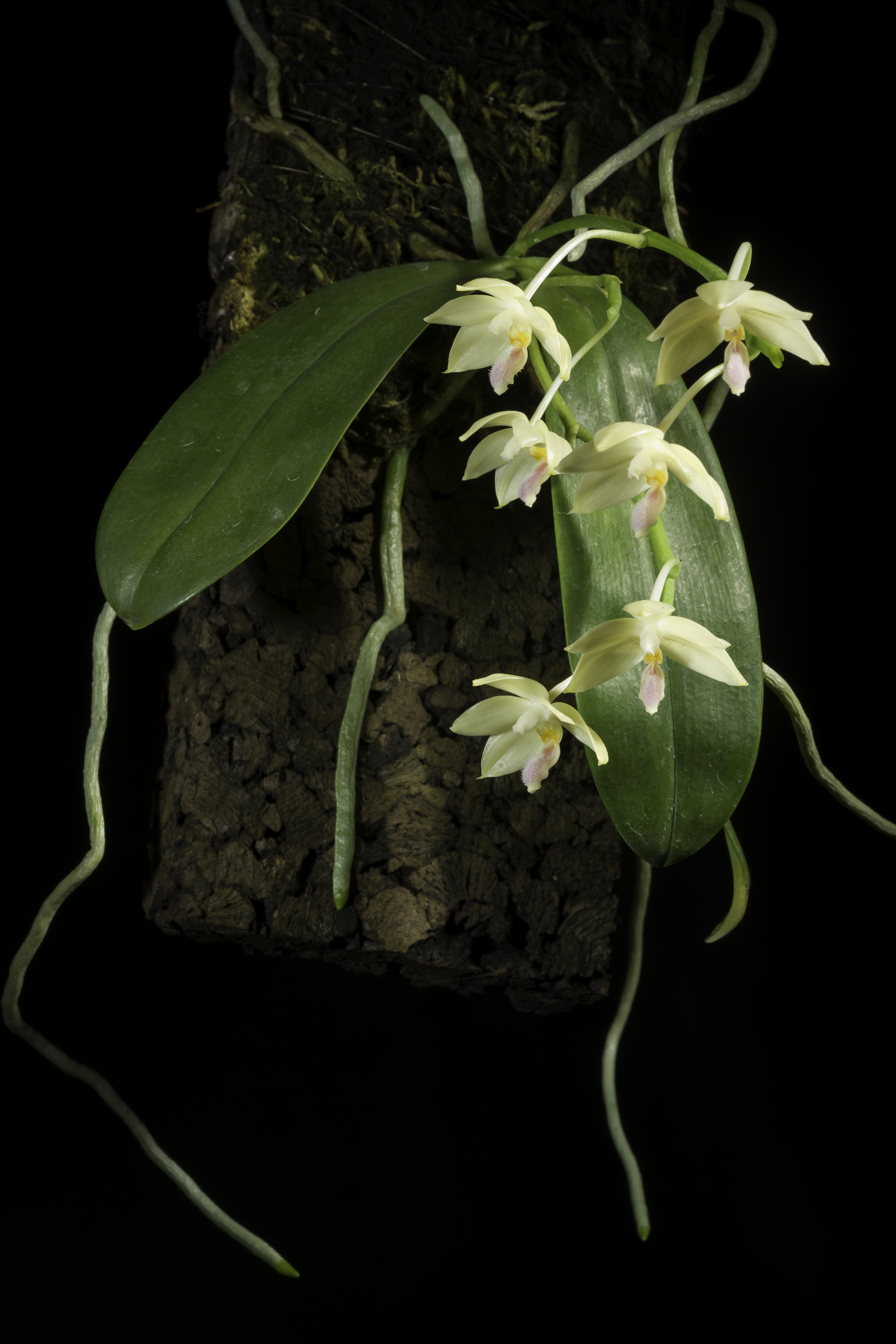
entire plant with pendent habitus

== Description ==
This species of herbaceous epiphyte has 5-7 leaves up to 25 cm in length and 9 cm in width. The leaves are longer than the 2-3 flowered inflorescences, which are 10–20 cm long and produce cream coloured flowers, which are 4 cm wide. Pale brown transverse colouration occurs at the bases of lateral sepals. The petals are plain cream white and unmarked. The midlobe of the labellum has a dull rose keel and a crenulate-denticulate apex with fleshy trichomes. The lateral lobes of the labellum are irregularly truncate. The slightly arching column is 6–8 mm long.

== Taxonomy ==
Confusion with Phalaenopsis javanica occurred, as photographs of the type specimens were taken, in which the flowers were not fully open. This led to confusion, as Phalaenopsis javanica has flowers of similar appearance, which do not open widely. This mistake was made in the first publication and subsequent second appearance in print. Phalaenopsis floresnsis flowers however do expand fully, unlike Phalaenopsis javanica flowers.

== Ecology ==
This species grows on trees at elevations of 150–300 m or 300–500 m. The information is conflicting in that regard.

== Conservation ==
Ex-situ conservation through artificial propagation has been researched. It is protected by national legislation. In addition, international trade is regulated through the CITES appendix II regulations of international trade.
