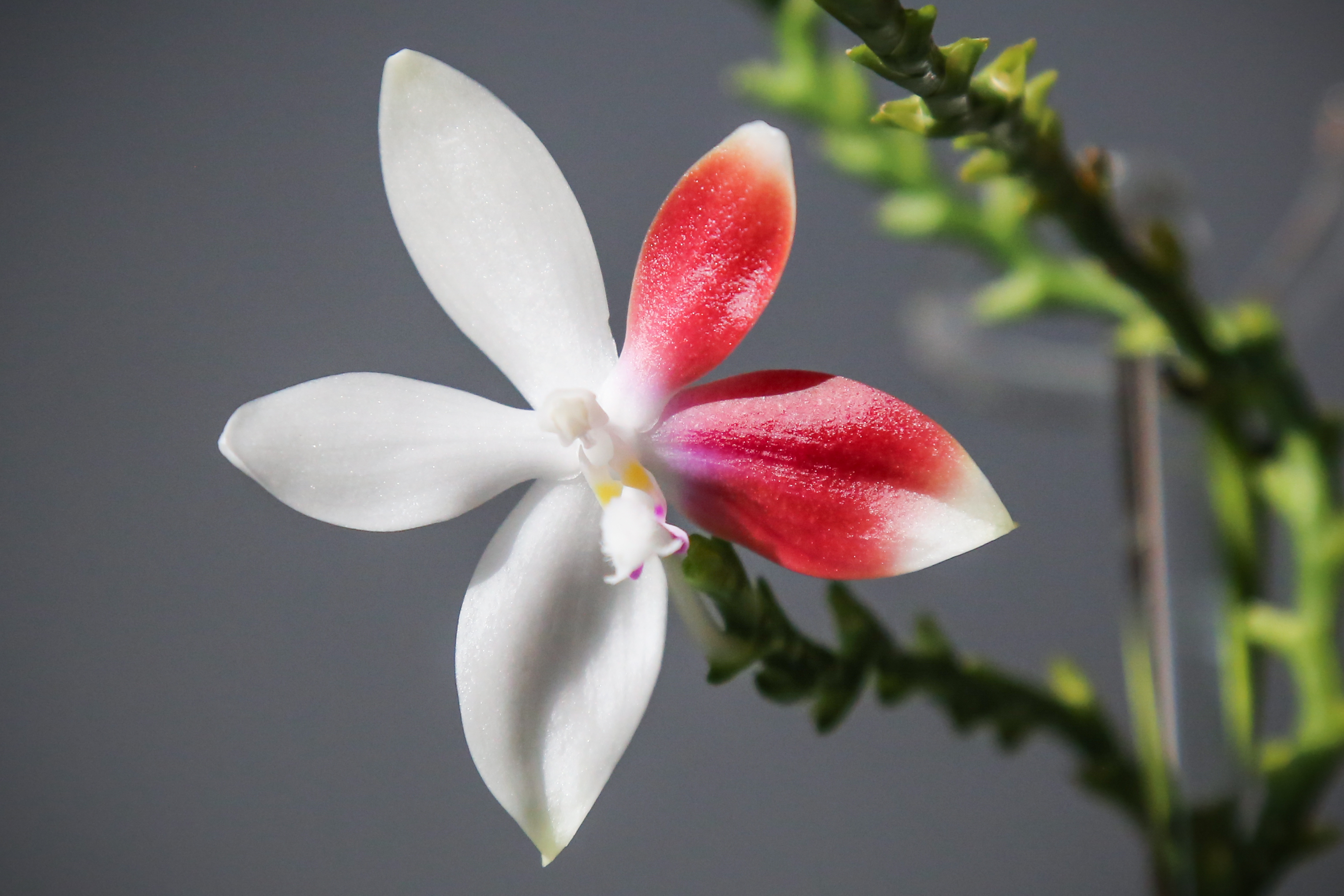
- Flower of Phalaenopsis tetraspis

Scientific classification
- Kingdom: Plantae
- Clade: Tracheophytes
- Clade: Angiosperms
- Clade: Monocots
- Order: Asparagales
- Family: Orchidaceae
- Subfamily: Epidendroideae
- Genus: Phalaenopsis
- Species: P. tetraspis

Binomial name
- Phalaenopsis tetraspis Rchb.f.

Synonyms
- Phalaenopsis barrii King ex Hook.f.; Phalaenopsis speciosa Rchb.f.; Phalaenopsis speciosa var. christiana Rchb.f.; Phalaenopsis speciosa var. imperatrix Rchb.f.; Phalaenopsis tetraspis f. alba O.Gruss & Koop.; Phalaenopsis tetraspis f. brunneola O.Gruss & Koop.; Phalaenopsis tetraspis f. christiana (E.S.Berk.) O.Gruss & W.E.Higgins; Phalaenopsis tetraspis f. imperatrix (E.S.Berk.) O.Gruss & W.E.Higgins; Phalaenopsis tetraspis f. livida O.Gruss & S.Tönne; Phalaenopsis tetraspis f. speciosa (Rchb.f.) O.Gruss & W.E.Higgins; Polychilos speciosa (Rchb.f.) Shim

= Phalaenopsis tetraspis =

Species of orchid

Phalaenopsis tetraspis is a species of epiphytic orchid endemic to the Andaman Islands, the Nicobar Islands and northwestern Sumatra. It was originally erroneously published as a Himalayan species by Reichenbach, which was corrected by James Veitch 23 years after Heinrich Gustav Reichenbachs publication. Mature specimens may have up to nine leaves, but usually plants have 4–5, elliptic-obovate, acute to obtuse, 20 cm long and 8 cm wide leaves. Showy, fleshy, fragrant flowers are produced on axillary, arching to subpendent racemes or panicles. A prominent feature of this species is the midlobe of the labellum, which is oblong, obtuse-subacute, and the apex is covered in dense trichomes. The karyotype is asymmetric and nonuniform.

== Confusion with Phalaenopsis speciosa ==
Both names were assigned on the basis of preserved specimens by Heinrich Gustav Reichenbach. He saw differences in leaf colouration, in addition to floral and root morphology. These differences are however insignificant and both taxa differ solely in their floral colouration. The colouration is however a very transitory trait and various intermediate forms between red and white occur. The floral phenotype even shows temporal variations within singular individuals in subsequent seasons. Therefore, the sole reason of separation, which was the floral colouration, cannot be seen as a hard fact, but rather as a transitory characteristic, which does not legitimise a separate species status. Based on these observations Phalaenopsis speciosa was reduced to a synonym of Phalaenopsis tetraspis.

== Horticulture ==
As of February 2022, the International Orchid Register of the Royal Horticultural Society lists 187 registered hybrids involving Phalaenopsis tetraspis under the inclusion of its synonym Phalaenopsis speciosa. The taxonomic changes have only been sparingly adapted in horticulture and plants are often still sold as Phalaenopsis speciosa.

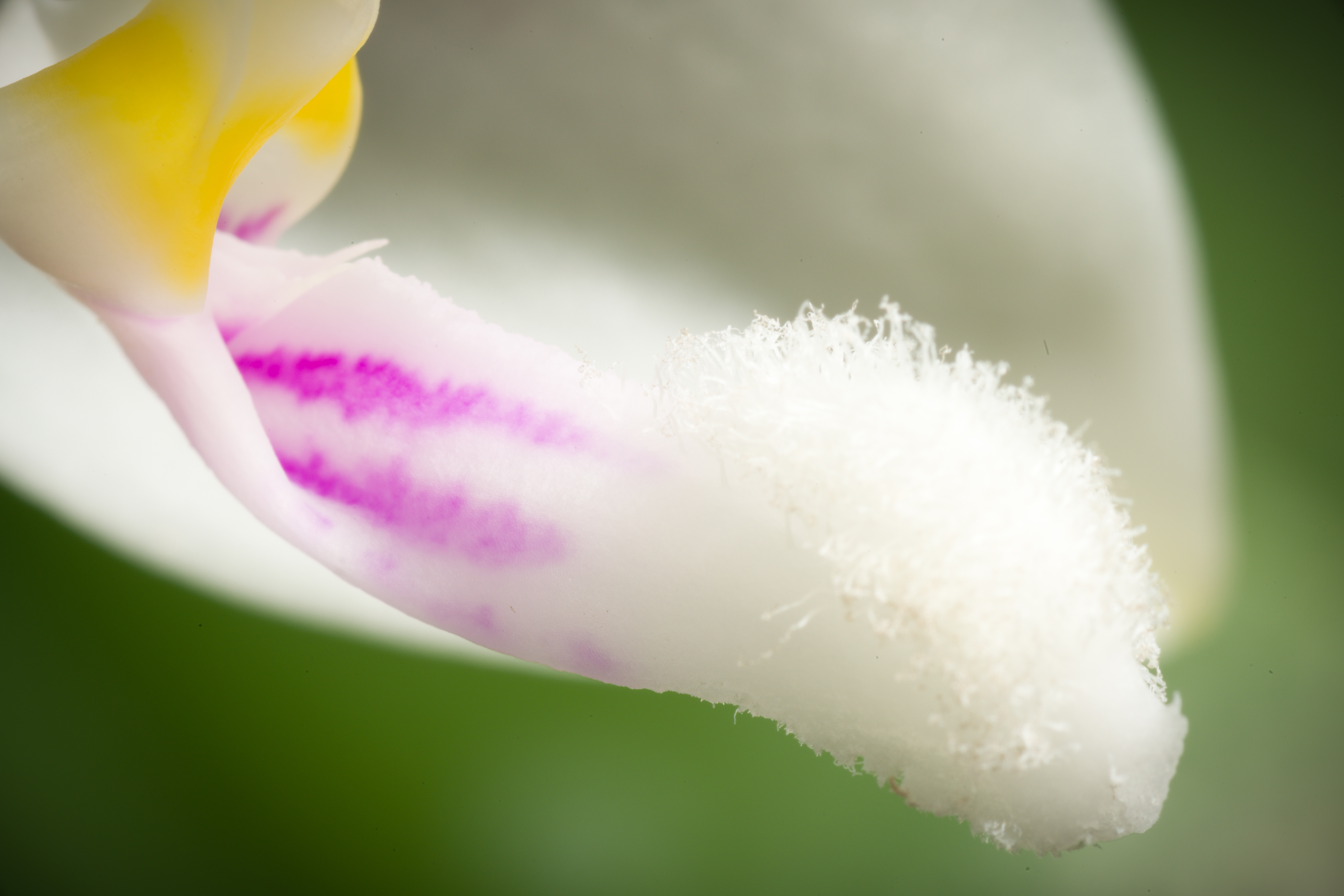
midlobe of the labellum densely covered in trichomes

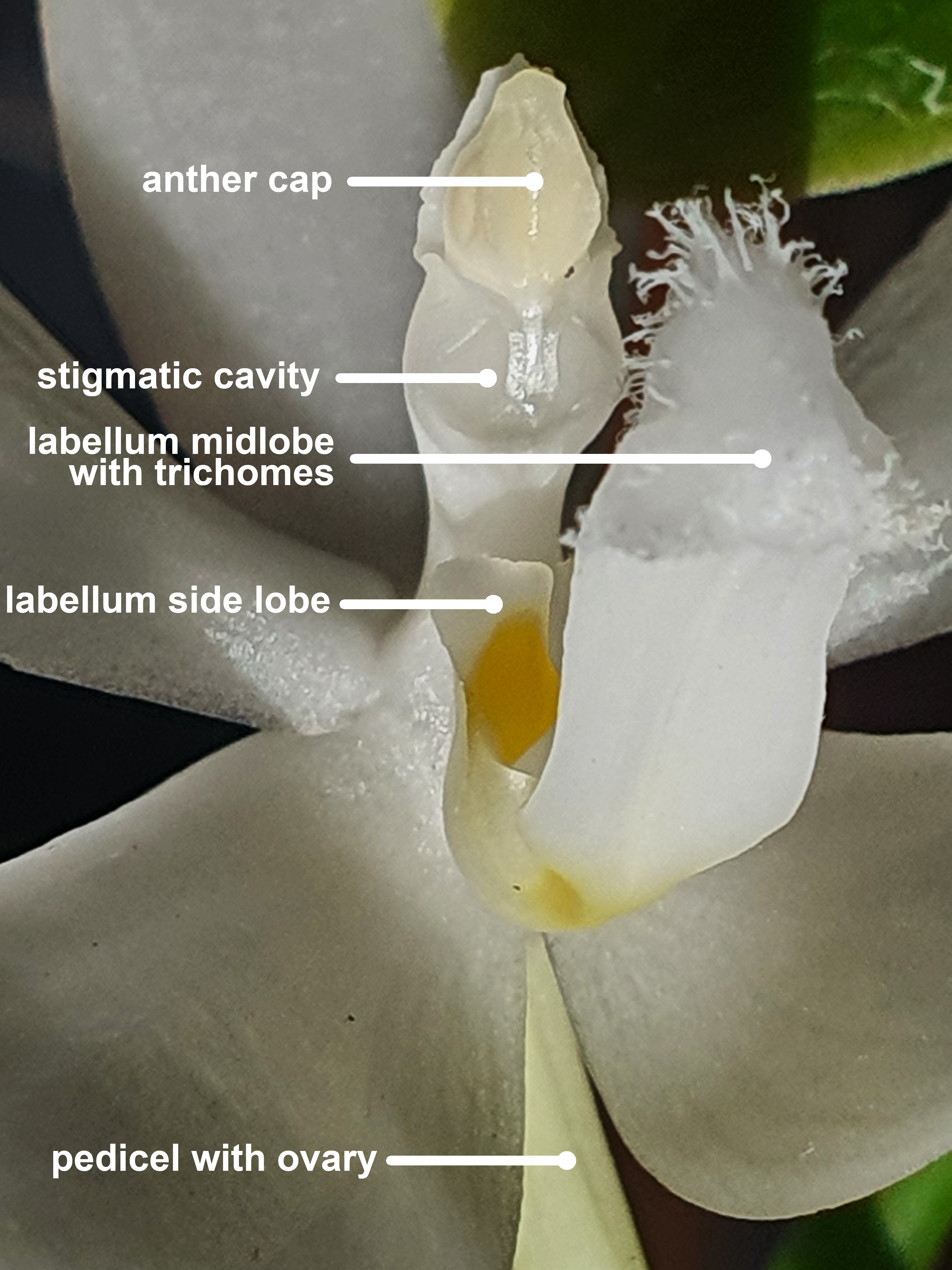
close-up of flower with labeling
