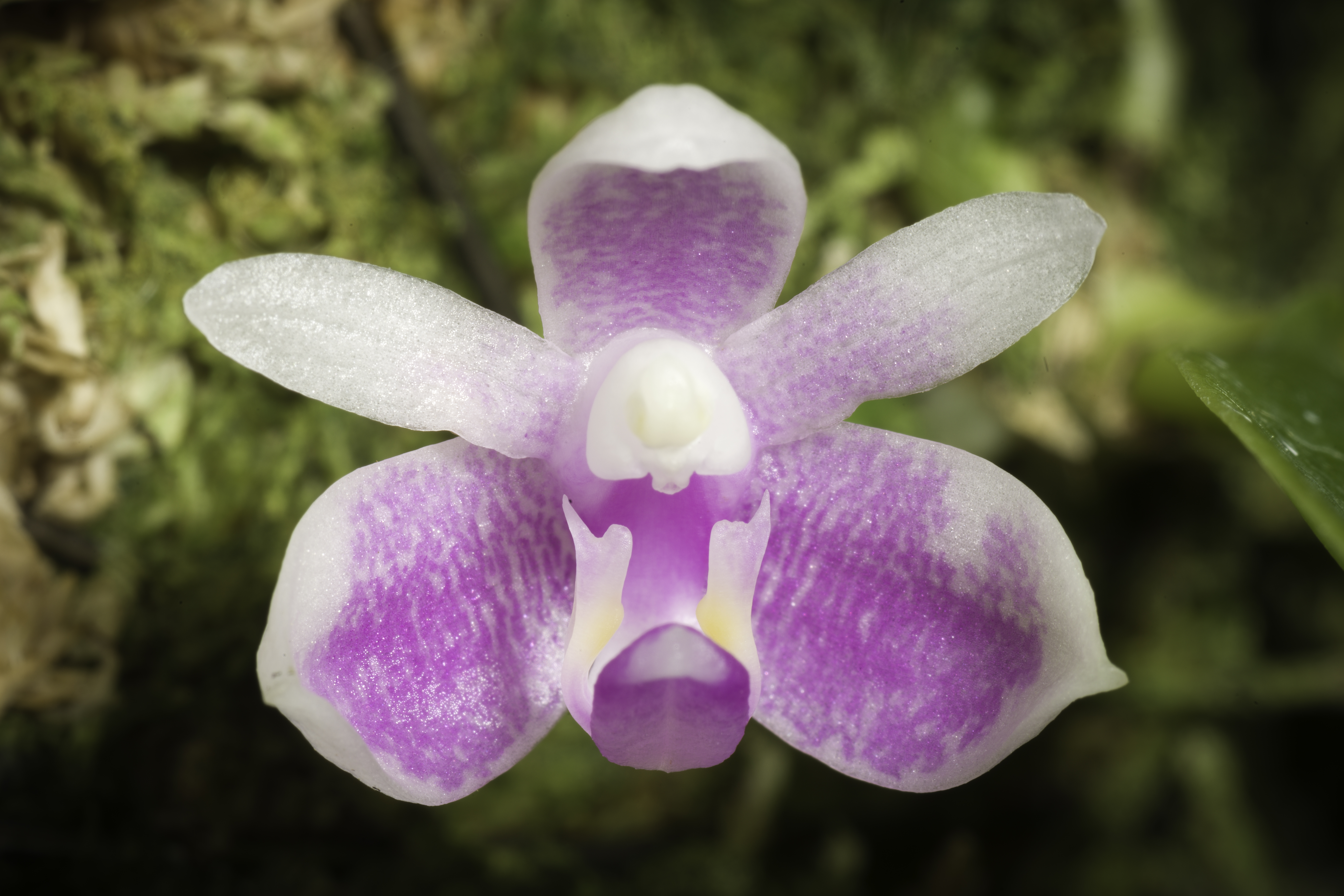
- flower detail

Scientific classification
- Kingdom: Plantae
- Clade: Tracheophytes
- Clade: Angiosperms
- Clade: Monocots
- Order: Asparagales
- Family: Orchidaceae
- Subfamily: Epidendroideae
- Genus: Phalaenopsis
- Species: P. modesta

Binomial name
- Phalaenopsis modesta J.J.Sm.
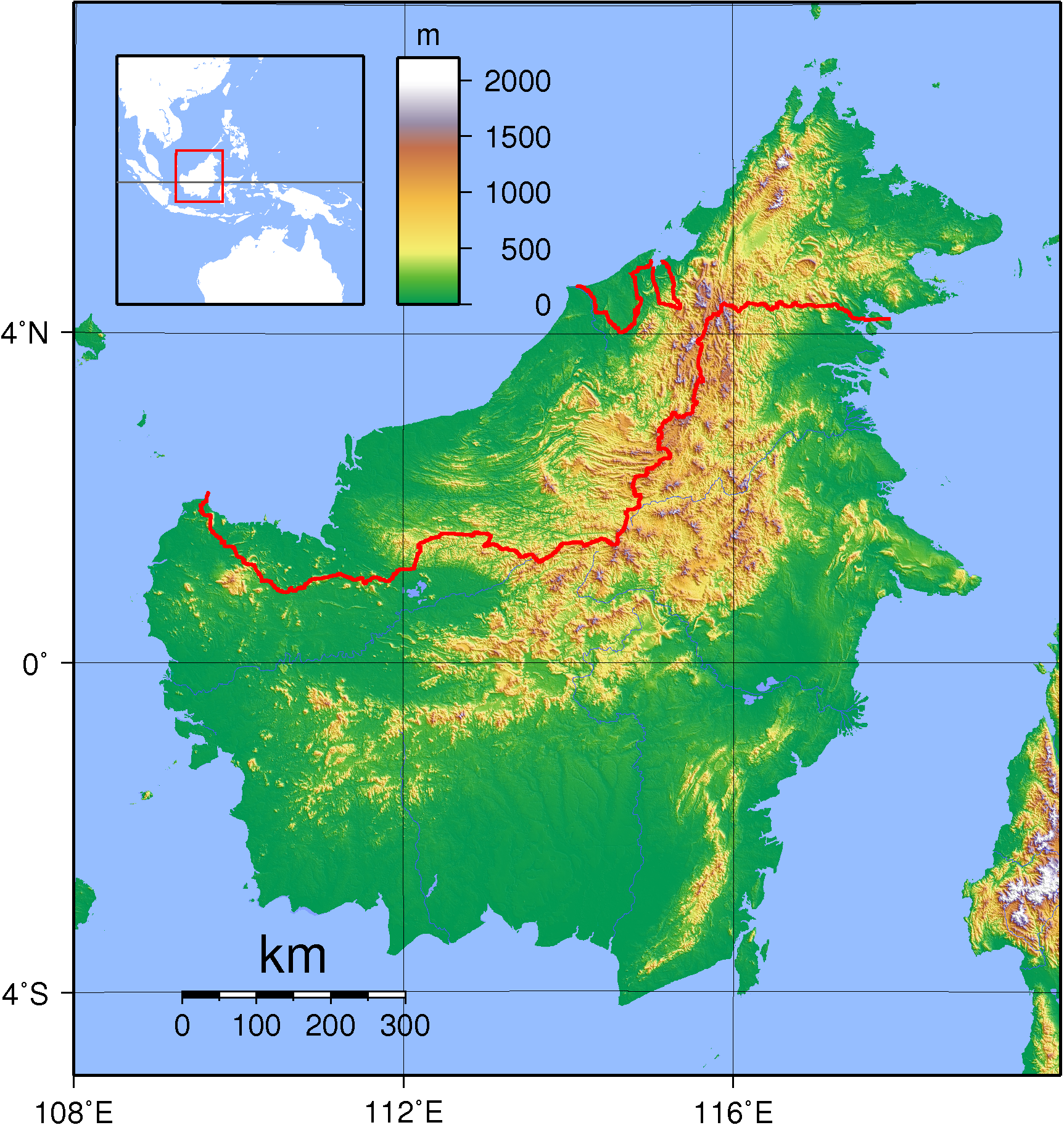
- distribution of Phalaenopsis modesta

Synonyms
- Phalaenopsis modesta f. alba O.Gruss & Roeth; Polychilos modesta (J.J.Sm.) Shim; Phalaenopsis modesta subsp. sabahensis Fowlie nom. nud., ex icon.; Phalaenopsis modesta var. bella Gruss & Röllke

= Phalaenopsis modesta =

Species of epiphytic orchid

Phalaenopsis modesta is a species of orchid endemic to Borneo. The specific epithet modesta, from the Latin modestus, means unassuming, moderate or modest.

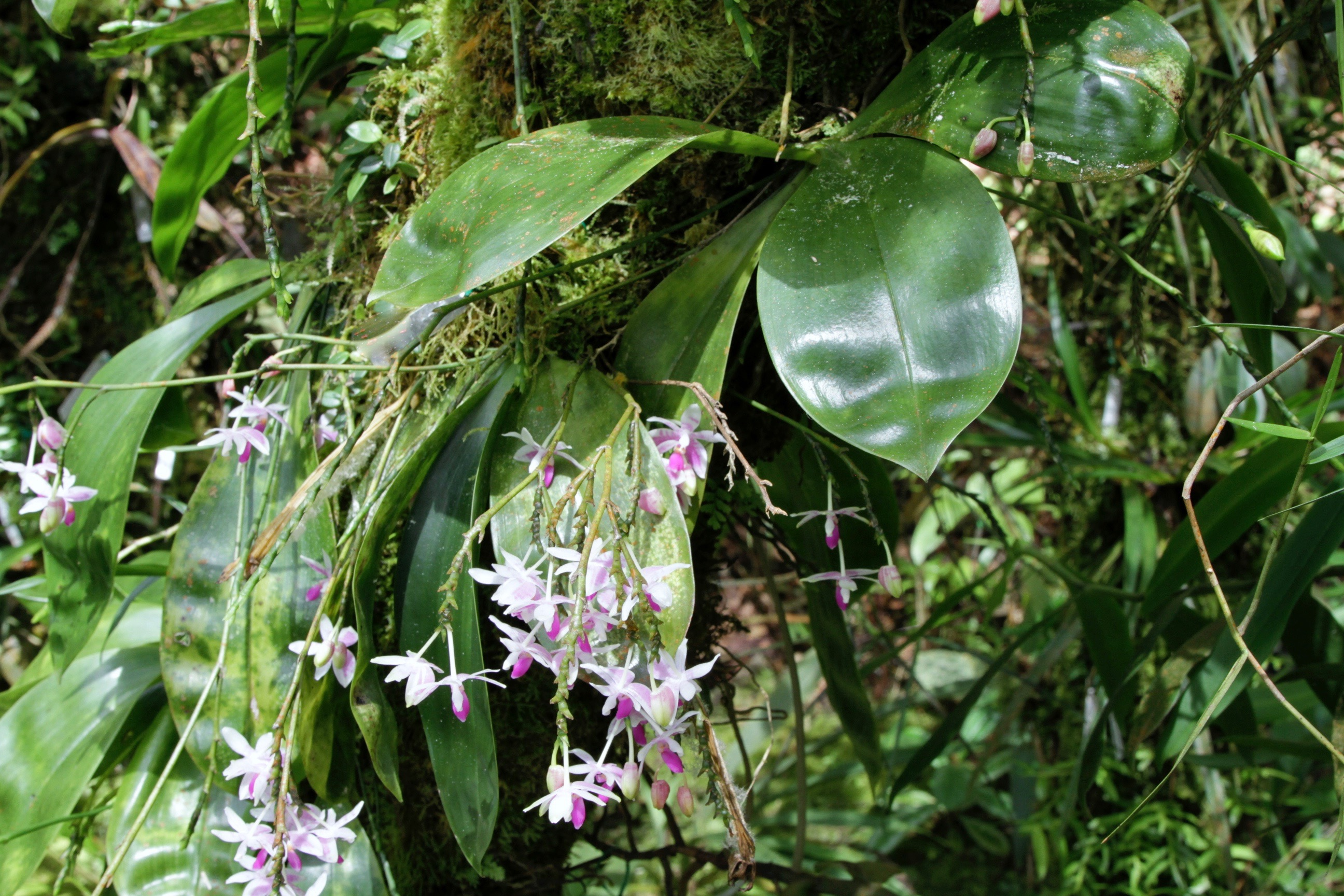
Phalaenopsis modesta in situ

== Description ==
This epiphytic species is usually found at the base of the phorophytes. The plants have 1–4 elliptic-obovate, glossy, 23 cm long and 6 cm wide leaves. Fragrant, white flowers with purple transverse barring are produced on pendent, branched or unbranched inflorescences. The labellum lacks trichomes. Flowering occurs from September to November and from May to June.

== Ecology ==
Phalaenopsis modesta occurs at elevations of 50–900 m above sea level.

== Taxonomy ==
The variety Phalaenopsis modesta var. bella Gruss & Röllke is suspected of being a hybrid of Phalaenopsis javanica and Phalaenopsis modesta.
Phalaenopsis modesta is said to be closely related to Phalaenopsis violacea based on floral characteristics. This is not supported by genetic evidence.

== Conservation ==
This species has been categorized as vulnerable (V)
