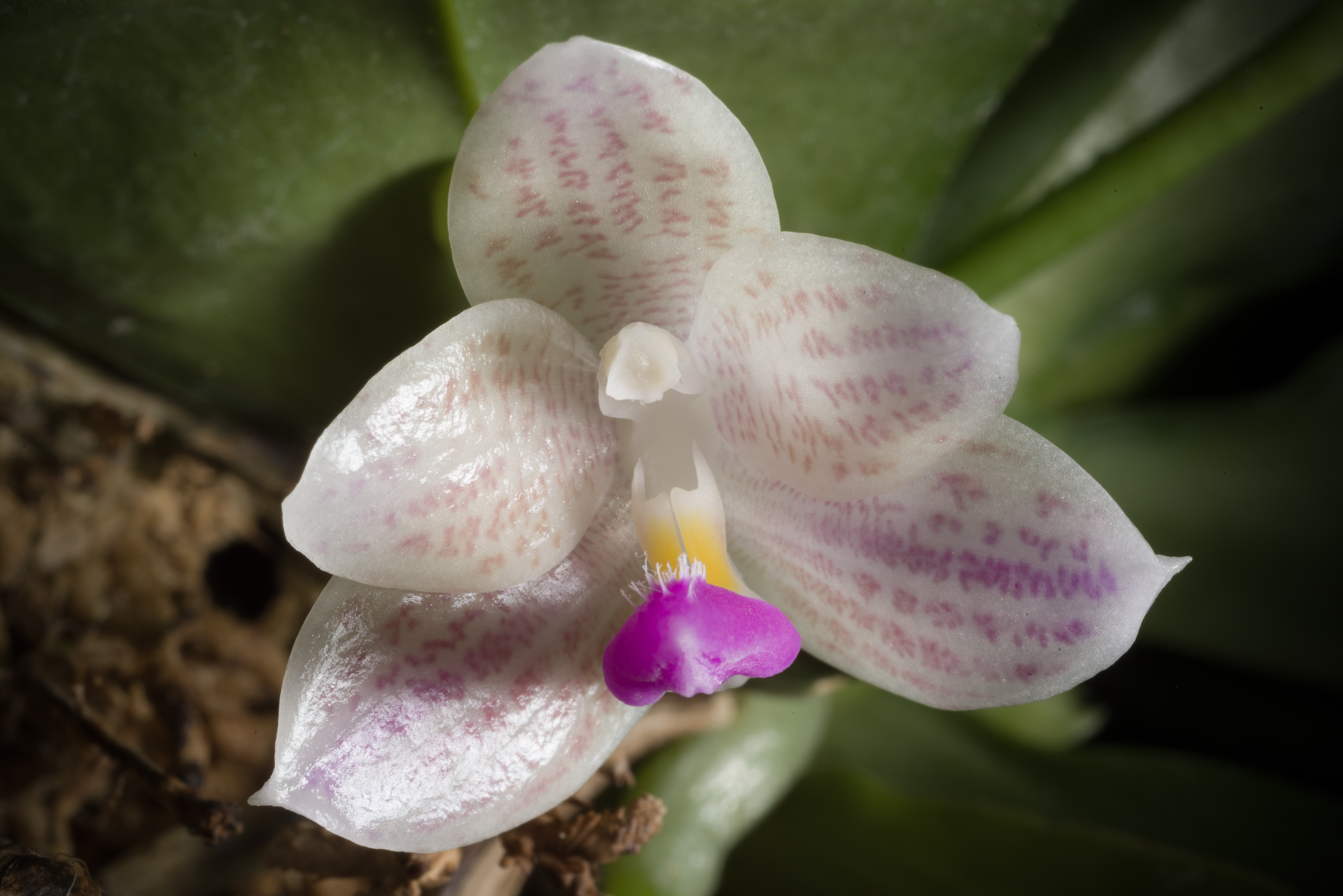
- flower detail

Scientific classification
- Kingdom: Plantae
- Clade: Tracheophytes
- Clade: Angiosperms
- Clade: Monocots
- Order: Asparagales
- Family: Orchidaceae
- Subfamily: Epidendroideae
- Genus: Phalaenopsis
- Species: P. javanica

Binomial name
- Phalaenopsis javanica J.J.Sm.
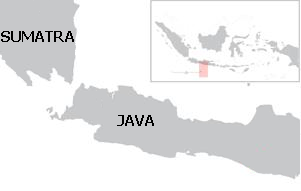
- distribution of Phalaenopsis javanica

Synonyms
- Phalaenopsis javanica f. alba O.Gruss & Roellke ex Christenson; Phalaenopsis latisepala Rolfe; Polychilos javanica (J.J.Sm.) Shim

= Phalaenopsis javanica =

Species of epiphytic orchid

Phalaenopsis javanica is a species of orchid native to Java and Sumatra. The specific epithet javanica refers to the Indonesian island Java.

== Description ==
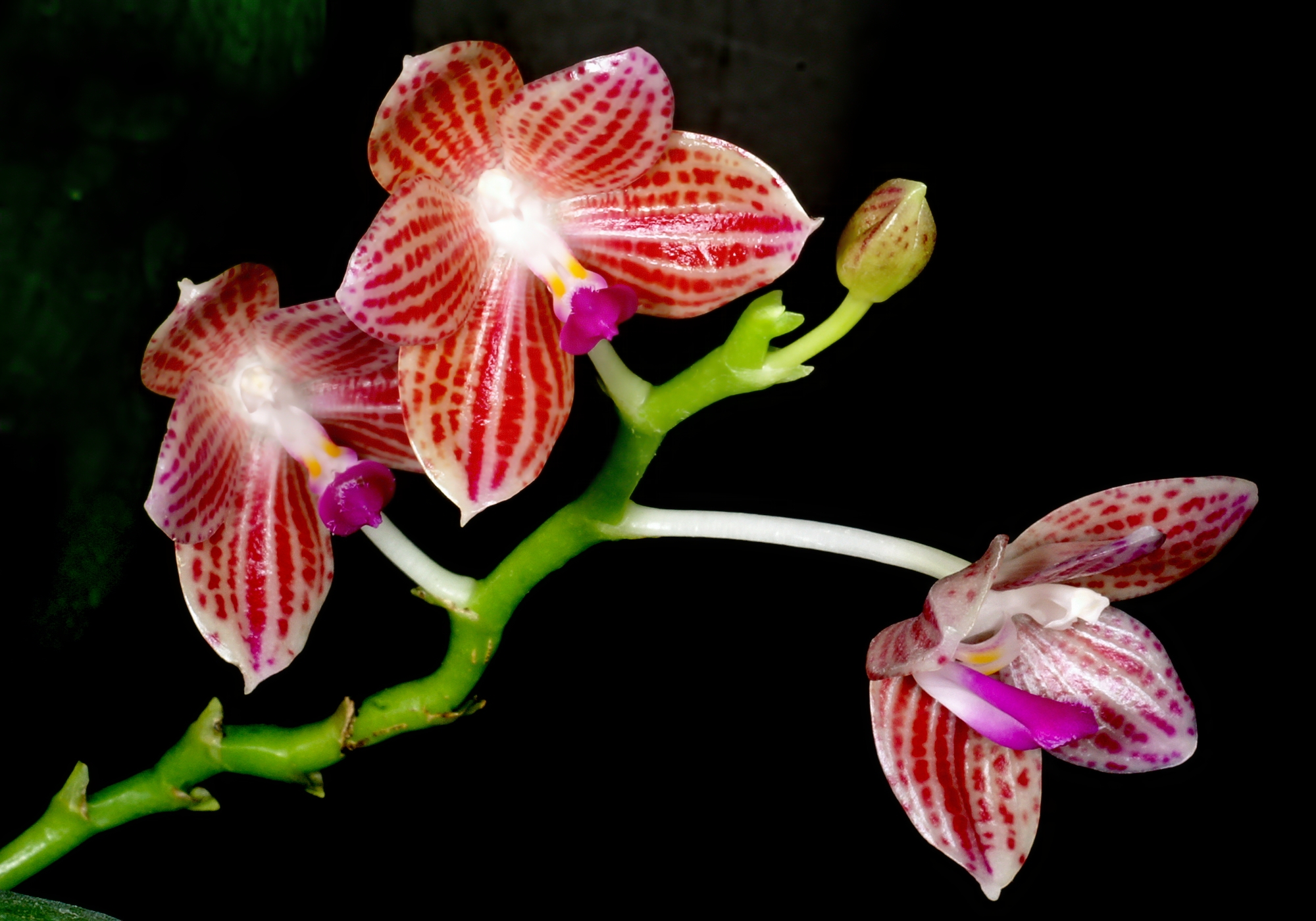
Red colour morph of the species

These epiphytic plants have numerous, shiny, waxy elliptic-obovate, distichously arranged leaves up to 22 cm in length and 10 cm in width. Suberect racemes or panicles up to 25 cm long arise from the leaf axils. They produce 3 cm wide flowers with striped colouration on petals and sepals. The flowers with a cream white to yellowish ground colour are fleshy and do not open widely. Fleshy trichomes arise from the apex of the labellum.

In hybridisation, the colour pattern is inherited at the diploid level. Despite the colouration, it has not been widely used in hybridisation, as the flowers are strongly cupped and have other underireable traits, which are expressed in offspring. Despite these drawbacks, 120 hybrids have been registered with the International Orchid Register of the Royal Horticultural Society.

The colouration is variable. White forms of this species are categorized as Phalaenopsis javanica f. alba O.Gruss & Roellke ex Christenson. This colour morph is however more yellow, rather than pure white and the forma alba might be misleading. True white colouration has not been observed.

== Taxonomy ==
After the publication of Phalaenopsis floresensis taxonomic confusion arose, due to the misleading photographs, which were taken of not yet fully open flowers. Phalaenopsis javanica has flowers of similar appearance as Phalaenopsis floresensis, however the flowers of Phalaenopsis floresensis open widely, while flowers of Phalaenopsis javanica never open fully. This mistake was reinforced by second appearance in print, in which Phalaenopsis floresensis again were photographed in a premature stage.

This species is closely related to Phalaenopsis patherina. This species pair is closely related to Phalaenopsis cornu-cervi.

== Conservation ==
After the discovery of one population in the 1970s on a mountain in West Java, it was completely destroyed through poaching. This species is limited in its distribution and it is classified as rare. The conservation status is classified as threatened. It is said to be extinct in the wild. Ex situ conservation through artificial propagation has been researched.

International trade is regulated through the CITES appendix II regulations of international trade.
