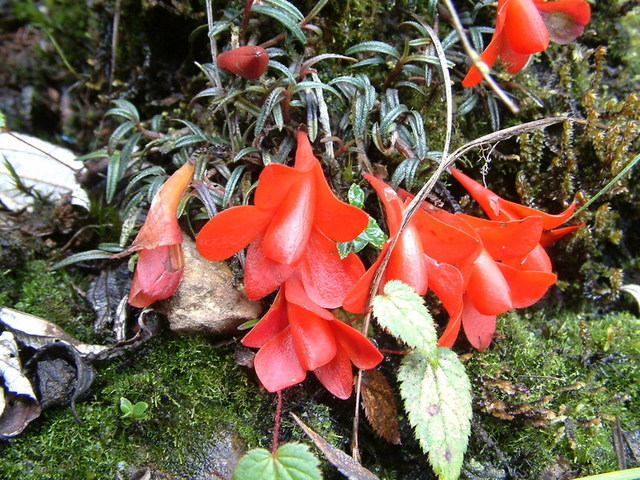

Scientific classification
- Kingdom: Plantae
- Clade: Tracheophytes
- Clade: Angiosperms
- Clade: Monocots
- Order: Asparagales
- Family: Orchidaceae
- Subfamily: Epidendroideae
- Genus: Dendrobium
- Species: D. cuthbertsonii

Binomial name
- Dendrobium cuthbertsonii F. Muell.

Synonyms
- Pedilonum cuthbertsonii (F.Muell.) Brieger in F.R.R.Schlechter; Maccraithea cuthbertsonii (F.Muell.) M.A.Clem. & D.L.Jones; Dendrobium agathodaemonis J.J.Sm.; Dendrobium asperifolium J.J.Sm.; Dendrobium sophronites Schltr.; Dendrobium trachyphyllum Schltr.; Dendrobium coccinellum Ridl.; Dendrobium euphues Ridl.; Dendrobium laetum Schltr.; Dendrobium atromarginatum J.J.Sm.; Dendrobium lichenicola J.J.Sm.; Pedilonum asperifolium (J.J.Sm.) Brieger in F.R.R.Schlechter; Pedilonum trachyphyllum (Schltr.) Brieger in F.R.R.Schlechter; Pedilonum coccinellum (Ridl.) Rauschert; Pedilonum euphues (Ridl.) Rauschert; Pedilonum sophronites (Schltr.) Rauschert; Maccraithea agathodaemonis (J.J.Sm.) M.A.Clem. & D.L.Jones; Maccraithea asperifolia (J.J.Sm.) M.A.Clem. & D.L.Jones; Maccraithea atromarginata (J.J.Sm.) M.A.Clem. & D.L.Jones; Maccraithea coccinella (Ridl.) M.A.Clem. & D.L.Jones; Maccraithea euphues (Ridl.) M.A.Clem. & D.L.Jones; Maccraithea lichenicola (J.J.Sm.) M.A.Clem. & D.L.Jones; Maccraithea sophronites (Schltr.) M.A.Clem. & D.L.Jones; Maccraithea trachyphylla (Schltr.) M.A.Clem. & D.L.Jones

= Dendrobium cuthbertsonii =

Species of orchid

Dendrobium cuthbertsonii is a species of orchid in the genus Dendrobium. It grows epiphytically at up to 10,000 feet (3,000 m) above sea level in New Guinea and the Bismarck Archipelago. It is targeted by commercial collectors who harvest it for export. It has one of the longest floral durations of any orchid, with individual flowers remaining open for up to nine months. Another source says ten months. Its stems are 1–2 centimetres (0.4–0.8 in) tall and 4–7 millimetres (0.16–0.28 in) wide; the flowers are 25–40 mm (1.0–1.6 in) long, 13–35 mm (0.5–1.4 in) wide, and extremely variable in colour., ranging from crimson through orangey-red.

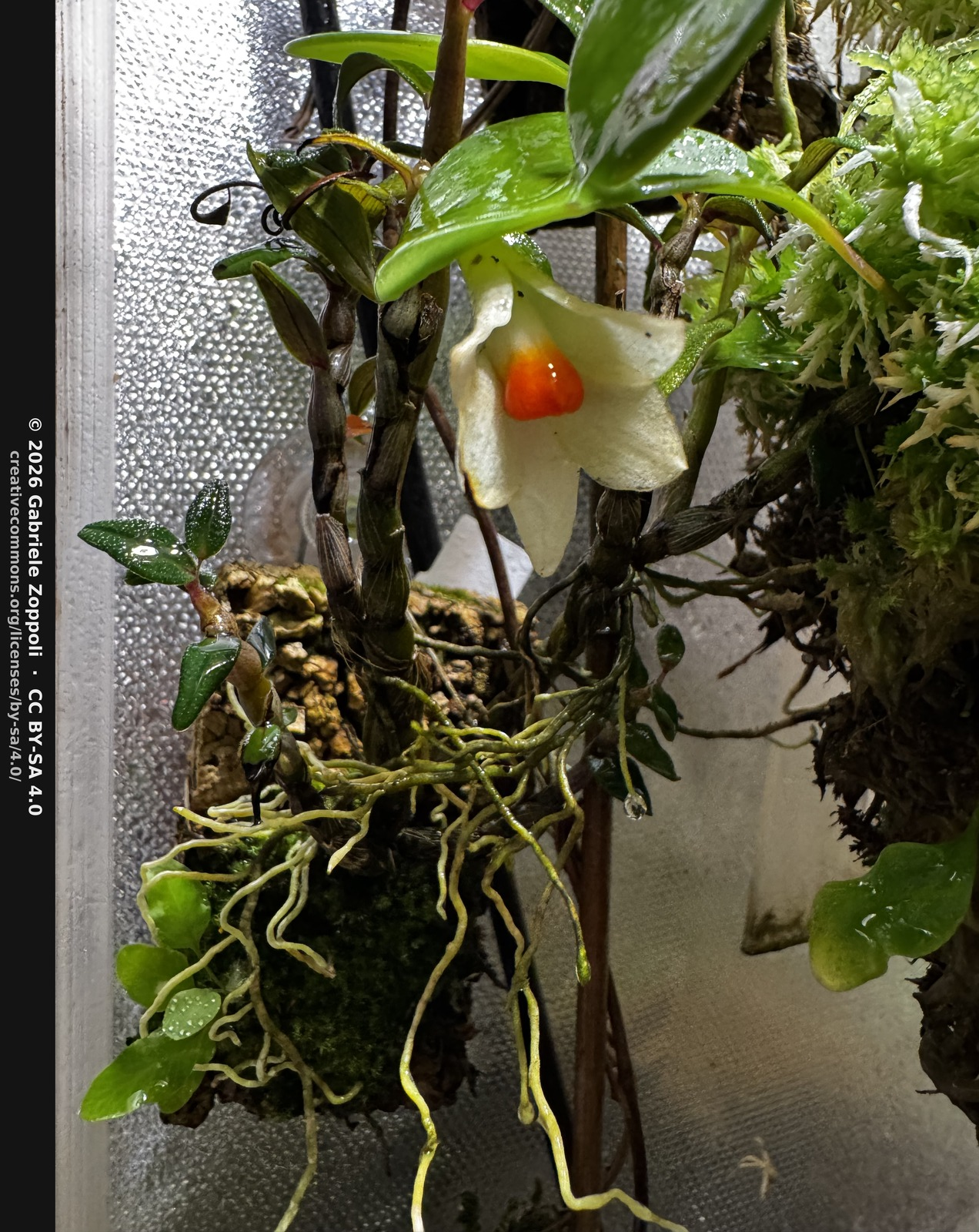
Yellow colour form of D. cuthbertsonii; flower colour is extremely variable in this species.
