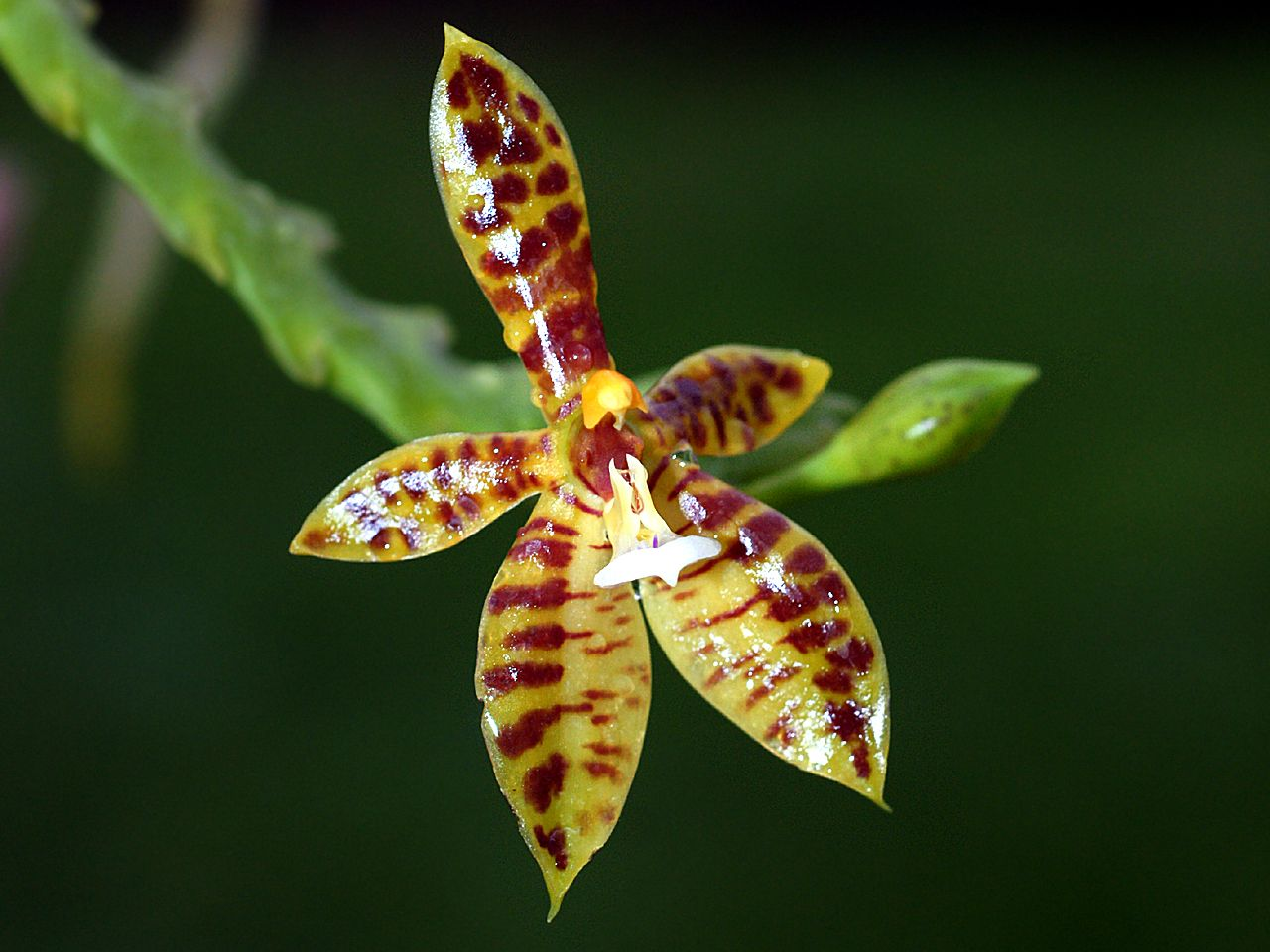
- Flower of Phalaenopsis cornu-cervi

Scientific classification
- Kingdom: Plantae
- Clade: Tracheophytes
- Clade: Angiosperms
- Clade: Monocots
- Order: Asparagales
- Family: Orchidaceae
- Subfamily: Epidendroideae
- Genus: Phalaenopsis
- Species: P. cornu-cervi

Binomial name
- Phalaenopsis cornu-cervi (Breda) Blume & Rchb.f.

Synonyms
- Polychilos cornu-cervi Breda (basionym); Polystylus cornu-cervi (Breda) Hasselt ex Hassk.; Polystylus cornu-cervi var. picta Hassk.; Phalaenopsis de-vriesiana Rchb.f.; Phalaenopsis lamelligera H.R.Sweet; Polychilos lamelligera (H.R.Sweet) Shim; Phalaenopsis thalebanii Seidenf.; Phalaenopsis cornu-cervi var. flava Braem ex Holle-De Raeve; Phalaenopsis borneensis Garay; Phalaenopsis cornu-cervi f. flava (Braem ex Holle-De Raeve) Christenson; Phalaenopsis cornu-cervi f. sanguinea Christenson; Phalaenopsis cornu-cervi f. thalebanii (Seidenf.) Christenson; Phalaenopsis cornu-cervi f. chattaladae D.L.Grove; Phalaenopsis cornu-cervi f. borneensis (Garay) O.Gruss & M.Wolff; Phalaenopsis cornu-cervi f. picta (Hassk.) O.Gruss & M.Wolff; Phalaenopsis borneensis Garay

= Phalaenopsis cornu-cervi =

Species of orchid

Phalaenopsis cornu-cervi is a species of orchid occurring from Indochina to western Malesia and the Philippines.

== Taxonomy ==
It is one of the parent species of the natural hybrid Phalaenopsis × valentinii, as well as the natural hybrid Phalaenopsis × lotubela.
