= Joannes Jacobus Smith =

Dutch botanist

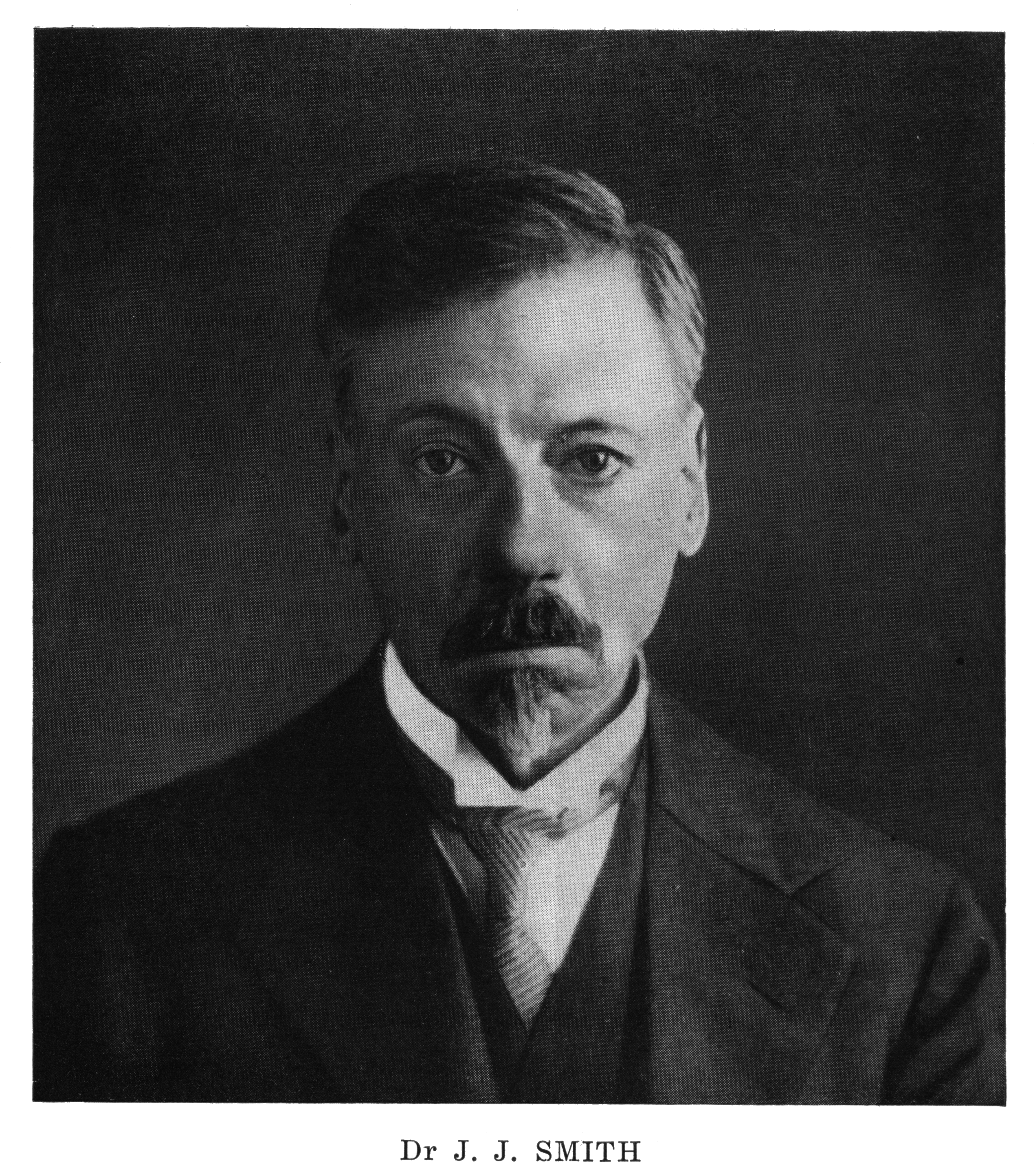
- Born: 29 June 1867; Antwerp
- Died: 14 January 1947 (aged 79); Oegstgeest, South Holland
- Education: Utrecht University (Honorary PhD 1810)
- Known for: Describing New Guinea orchids
- Scientific career
- Fields: Botany
- Institutions: Buitenzorg Botanical Gardens
- Author abbrev. (botany): J.J.Sm.

Joannes Jacobus Smith (Antwerp 29 June 1867 – Oegstgeest 14 January 1947) (also written as Johannes Jacobus Smith) was a Dutch botanist who, between years 1905 to 1924, crossed the islands of the Dutch East Indies (mainly Java), collecting specimens of plants and describing and cataloguing the flora of these islands. The standard botanical author abbreviation J.J.Sm. is applied to plants described by J.J. Smith.

The description of the flowers of the western half of New Guinea (then a Dutch territory) is largely based on his work. He was, next to Rudolf Schlechter, the most prolific author on New Guinea orchids. He also described numerous plants from other families, such as Ericaceae and Euphorbiaceae.

== Biography ==
Smith was born in Antwerp where his father worked in the postal department. The family moved to Utrecht in 1872 and to Amsterdam in 1875. He took an interest in growing plants and keeping animals. One of his secondary school teachers was Jan Costerus who advised him to study horticulture. Smith then went to learn at the company of Messrs Groenewegen & Co., Amsterdam, where he took a special interest in orchids. Smith moved to Dutch Java in 1891 and became assistant curator at the Buitenzorg Botanical Gardens (near Batavia), now Bogor. He made several expeditions in Java, Celebes (now Sulawesi), the Ambon Islands and the Moluccas. He continued to collaborate with Costerus on plant mutations and variations. In 1905 he was promoted to assistant of the herbarium. He was awarded an honorary Ph.D. degree at the Utrecht University in 1910. Finally, he was appointed the director of the Botanical Gardens at Buitenzorg from 1913 till his retirement in 1924. He then returned to Holland, settled in Utrecht and later in Oegstgeest, near Leiden. He continued describing orchids till shortly before his death in 1947, such as naming the Sumatran orchid Dendrochilum atjehense J.J.Sm. 1943.

== Botanical accomplishments ==
J.J.Smith studied and described hundreds of orchid species, amongst others :

- Aerides reversa J.J.Sm. (1912)
- Bulbophyllum borneense (Schltr.) J.J.Sm. (1912)
- Bulbophyllum brunendijkii J.J.Sm. (1906)
- Bulbophyllum echinolabium J.J.Sm. (1934)
- Calanthe veratrifolia var. dupliciloba J.J.Sm. (1922)
- Calanthe veratrifolia var. lancipetala J.J.Sm. (1930)
- Cirrhopetalum biflorum (Teijsm. & Binn.) J.J.Sm. (1903)
- Coelogyne salmonicolor var. virescentibus J.J.Sm. ex Dakkus (1935)
- Dendrobium acaciifolium J.J.Sm. (1917)
- Dendrobium acanthophippiiflorum J.J.Sm. (1915)
- Dendrobium agathodaemonis J.J.Sm. (1910)
- Dendrobium asperifolium J.J.Sm. (1911)
- Dendrobium atromarginatum J.J.Sm. (1929)
- Dendrobium capitellatum J.J.Sm. (1906)
- Dendrobium carstensziense J.J.Sm. (1929)
- Dendrobium confusum J.J.Sm. (1911)
- Dendrobium ephemerum J.J.Sm. (1917)
- Dendrobium halmaheirense J.J.Sm.
- Dendrobium lichenicola J.J.Sm. (1929)
- Dendrobium papilioniferum J.J.Sm. (1905)
- Dendrobium papilioniferum var. ephemerum J.J.Sm. (1905)
- Dendrobium quadrialatum J.J.Sm. (1922)
- Paphiopedilum glaucophyllum J.J.Smith (1905)
- Phalaenopsis amboinensis J.J.Sm. (1911)
- Phalaenopsis denevei J.J.Sm. (1925)
- Phalaenopsis fimbriata J.J.Sm. (1921)
- Phalaenopsis fimbriata var. sumatrana J.J.Sm. (1932)
- Phalaenopsis pulcherrima J.J.Sm. (1933)
- 67 Dendrochilum species
- and many more

He named several orchid genera:

- Abdominea J.J. Sm.1914.
- Ascocentrum Schlechter ex- J.J. Sm. 1914.

== Selected publications ==
He was the author of many taxonomic papers.

- Smith, Joannes Jacobus. : ‘Orchidaceae van Ambon. - Batavia, 1905. (in Dutch)
- Smith, Joannes Jacobus. Aanteekeningen over orchideeën. - [S.l.], 1920. - 5 dl. (in Dutch)
- Smith, Joannes Jacobus. : The Orchidaceae of Dr. W. Kaudern's expedition to Selebes. - [S.l.], 1926
- Smith, Joannes Jacobus. : Enumeration of the Orchidaceae of Sumatra and neighbouring islands. - Dahlem bei Berlin, 1933.
- Smith, J.J. Beiträge zur Kenntnis der Saprophyten Javas. XII-XIV: Burmannia tuberosa Becc. Leiden.. 102-138 pp. 16 lithogr. plts.
- Koorders, S.H. & J.J.Smith. Ericacea - Gentianaceae - Corsiaceae - Polugalaceae. Leiden, 1912. 14 pp. 46 lithogr. plts.
- Koorders, Sijfert Hendrik, Theodoric Valeton & Johannes Jacobus Smith: Bijdrage no. 1 [-13] tot de kennis der boomsoorten op Java. Additamenta ad cognitionem Florae javanicae … Batavia & ‘s Gravenhage, G. Kolff, 1894–1914, 13 volumes (J.J.Smith is the sole author of volume 12 and of volume 13 in collaboration with Theodoric Valeton)
- J.J. Smith et al. - 's Lands Plantentuin Buitenzorg. Gedenkschrift ter gelegenheid van het honderdjarig bestaan op 18 mei 1917. Eerste gedeelte. (Buitenzorg, 1917) (in Dutch)
- J.J. Smith - Geïllustreerde gids voor 's Lands Plantentuin Buitenzorg pp 60 pb Buitenzorg, zj ±1925 (in Dutch)

== Reference works ==
- Blumea, Suppl. 1, SMITH vol., 1937, with dedications, photographs, etc. Naturalis.
- D. F. van Slooten: Bulletin du Jardin Botanique de Buitenzorg sér. 3, vol. 14, 1937, p. 99–114, incl. bibliogr. & portr. Internet Archive.
- Wie is dat? ed. 3-4; Orchideeën, June 1942, 6 pp (in Dutch)
- Bull. Bot. Gard. Buitenzorg III, 17, 1948, p. 381-382
- Orchideeën, March 1949, p. 23-31 + portr.
