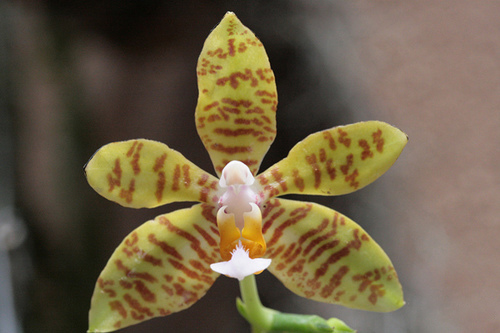
- Phalaenopsis amboinensis found in Maluku

Scientific classification
- Kingdom: Plantae
- Clade: Tracheophytes
- Clade: Angiosperms
- Clade: Monocots
- Order: Asparagales
- Family: Orchidaceae
- Subfamily: Epidendroideae
- Genus: Phalaenopsis
- Species: P. amboinensis

Binomial name
- Phalaenopsis amboinensis J.J.Sm.

Synonyms
- Polychilos amboinensis (J.J.Sm.) Shim; Phalaenopsis psilanthaSchltr.; Phalaenopsis hombronii Finet; Phalaenopsis amboinensis var. flavida Christenson; Phalaenopsis amboinensis f. flavida (Christenson) O.Gruss & M.Wolff

= Phalaenopsis amboinensis =

Species of flower

Phalaenopsis amboinensis, also known as the month Sulawesi orchid, is a species of monopodial epiphytic orchid flower native to eastern Indonesia.

This orchid species along with other Phalaenopsis species are highly valued in the market due to their resilience and beautiful flowers and are frequently hybridized with one another to create prettier flowers.

== Description ==
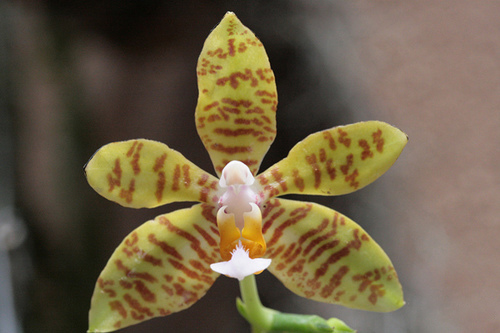
Phalaenopsis amboinensis found in Maluku.

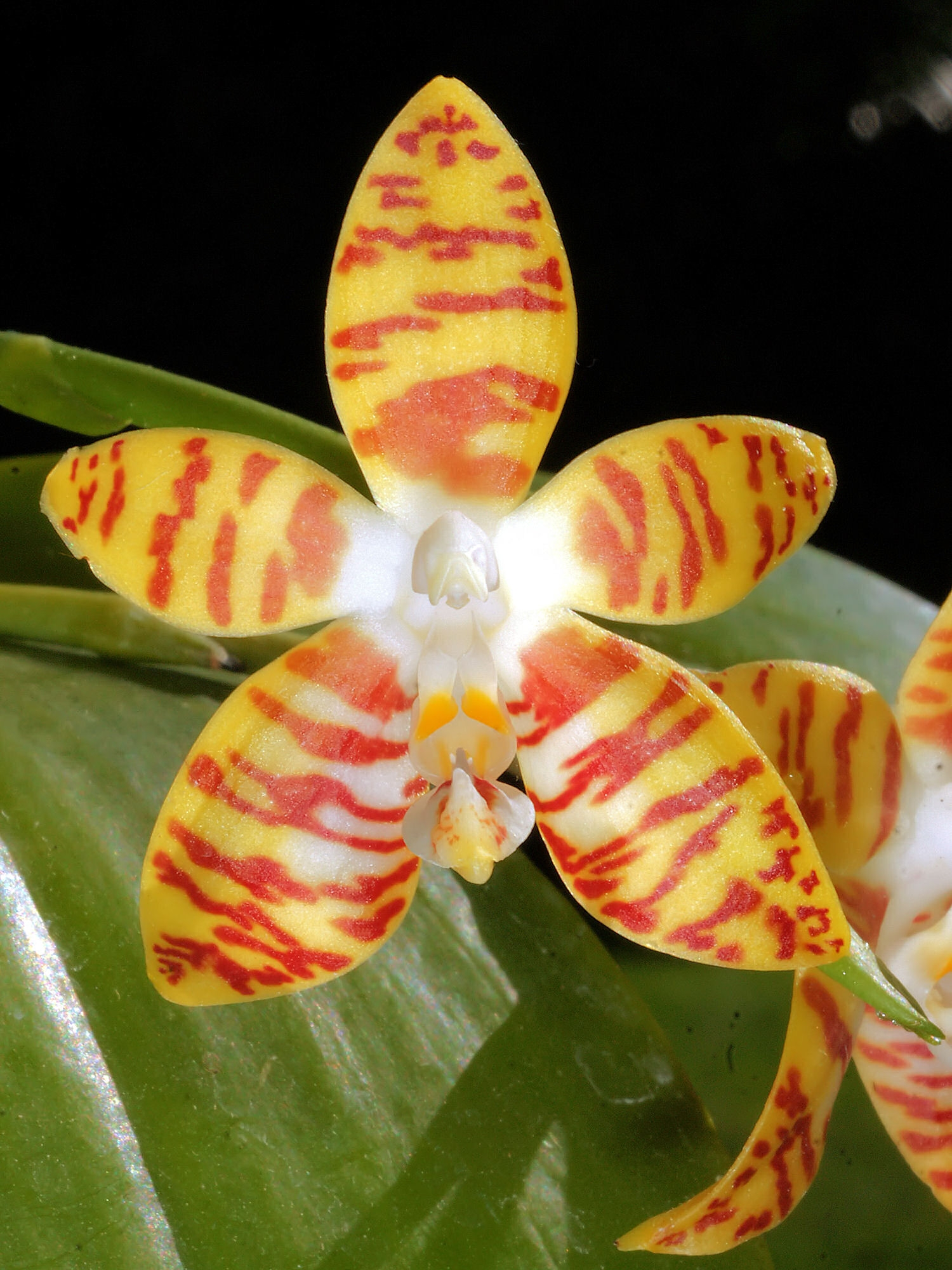
Phalaenopsis amboinensis found in Sulawesi

Phalaenopsis amboinensis has two flower variations. The orchids in the Sulawesi region have dark yellow flowers with thick dark brown lines. The orchids in the Maluku region have light yellow flowers with thin light brown lines. The orchid's flowers bloom late winter to early spring lasting throughout the summer. The flowers range from 4.5–5 centimeters (1.7–2 in) in size and have elliptical petals. Multiple flowering stems grow 15–20 centimeters (5.9–7.9 in) from the base of the orchid which creates several fragrant, long-lasting flowers at once. Five to six leaves grow in a distichous arrangement at the base of the plant. The leaves are elliptical in shape ranging from 22–25 centimeters (8.6–9.8 in) in length and 7–8 centimeters (2.8–3.1 in) in width and are thick and glabrous.

== Habitat ==
Phalaenopsis amboinensis can be found ranging from Sulawesi and Maluku. The orchid grows at elevations of 500-700m in well shaded areas beneath the tree canopy of the rain forest. The temperature of the rain forest range from 31°–32°C (87.8°– 89.6°F) during the summer and 29°–30°C (84.2°–86°F) during the winter and humidity ranges from 70% to 90%.

== Conservation ==
Phalaenopsis amboinensis is considered an endangered species and is protected by the Government Regulation No.7/1999 in Indonesia. Habitat exploitation and land deforestation are the main threat to the orchid species' native population. In Situ and Ex situ conservation methods are both being practiced to help conserve this orchid species. However, it was found challenging to nurse the orchid to maturity due to its extensive juvenile phase. Various propagation methods have been developed and tested to successfully develop the plant.
