= Monkey flower =

Monkey flower can refer to:

- Several genera of the plant family Phrymaceae, including:
  - Diplacus
  - Erythranthe
  - Mimulus
- Various snapdragon-like Lamiales, including:
  - Linaria vulgaris
  - Phyllocarpus septentrionalis, monkey-flower tree

== See also ==
- Monkey orchid
