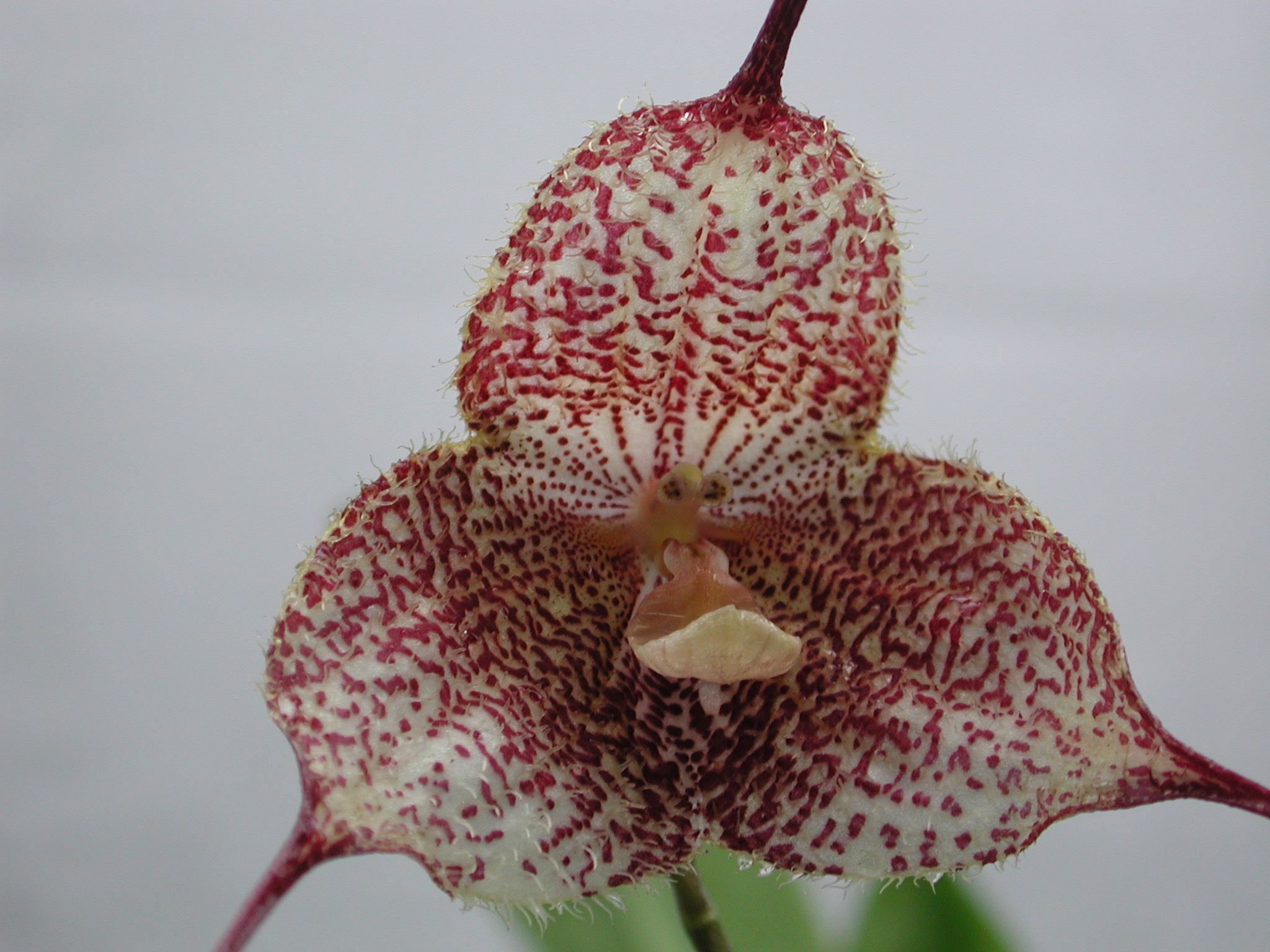
- Close-up of flower

Conservation status
- Endangered (IUCN 3.1)

Scientific classification
- Kingdom: Plantae
- Clade: Embryophytes
- Clade: Tracheophytes
- Clade: Spermatophytes
- Clade: Angiosperms
- Clade: Monocots
- Order: Asparagales
- Family: Orchidaceae
- Subfamily: Epidendroideae
- Genus: Dracula
- Species: D. gorgona

Binomial name
- Dracula gorgona (A.H.Kent) Luer & R.Escobar

Synonyms
- Masdevallia chimaera var. gorgona A.H.Kent

= Dracula gorgona =

Species of plant

Dracula gorgona is a species of flowering plant in the family Orchidaceae. It is native to western Colombia. An epiphyte, it is found in wet tropical forests in only 5 locations at elevations from 1,900 to 2,900 m (6,200 to 9,500 ft). It has been assessed as Endangered due to habitat destruction and to collection of individuals in the wild for the orchid fancier trade.
