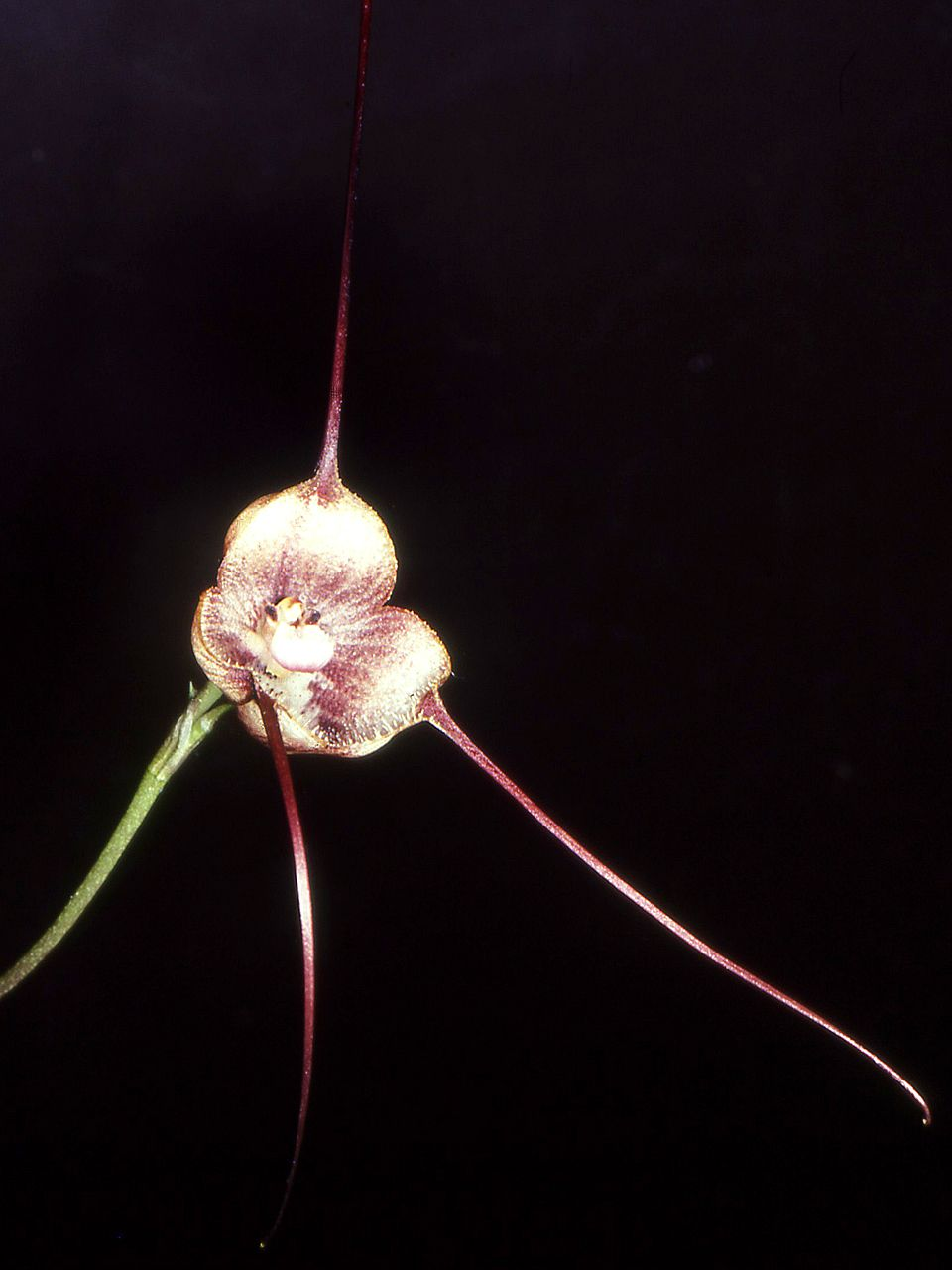

Scientific classification
- Kingdom: Plantae
- Clade: Tracheophytes
- Clade: Angiosperms
- Clade: Monocots
- Order: Asparagales
- Family: Orchidaceae
- Subfamily: Epidendroideae
- Genus: Dracula
- Species: D. syndactyla

Binomial name
- Dracula syndactyla Luer

= Dracula syndactyla =

Species of orchid

Dracula syndactyla is a species of orchid.
