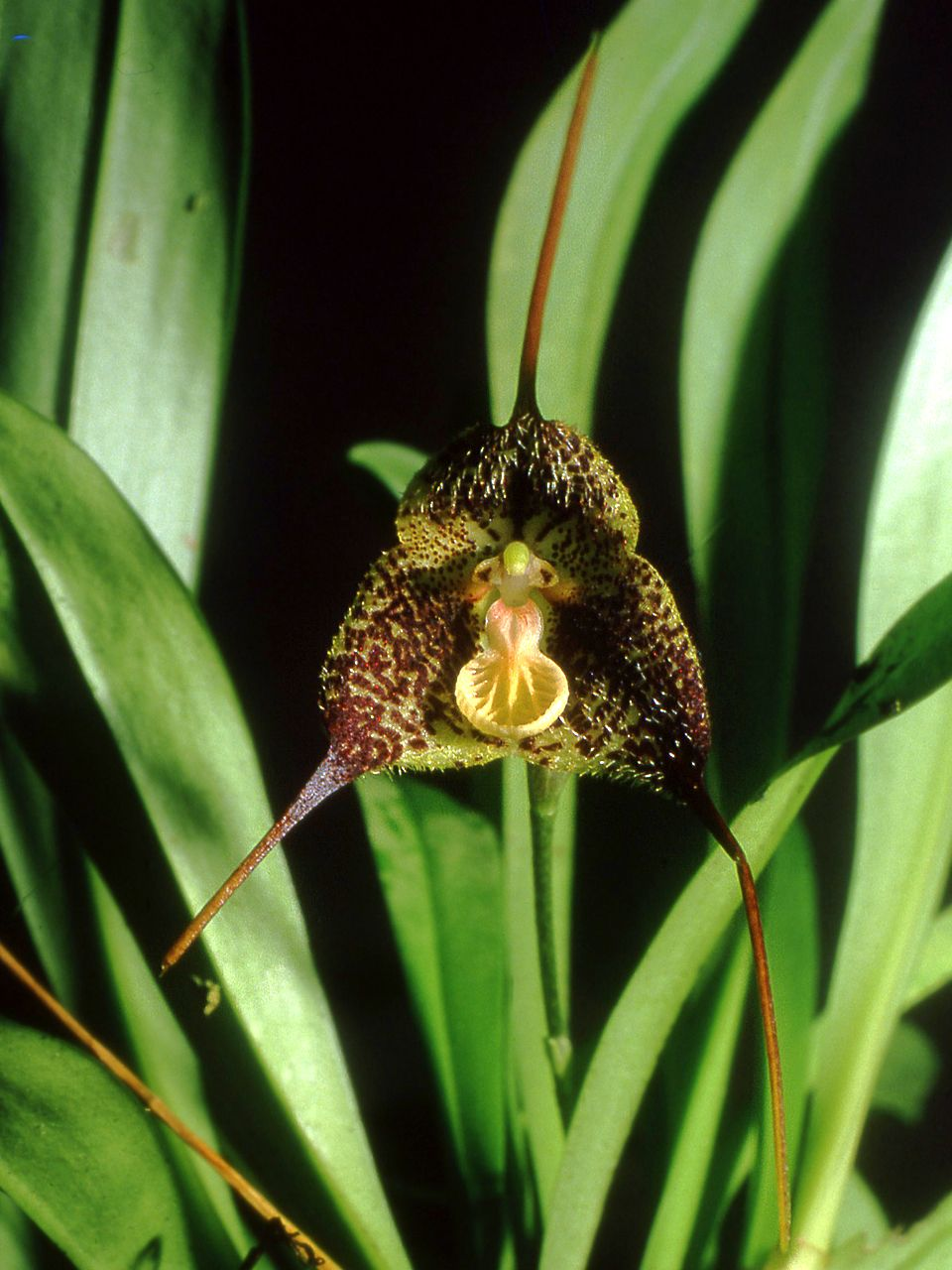

Scientific classification
- Kingdom: Plantae
- Clade: Tracheophytes
- Clade: Angiosperms
- Clade: Monocots
- Order: Asparagales
- Family: Orchidaceae
- Subfamily: Epidendroideae
- Genus: Dracula
- Species: D. ubangina

Binomial name
- Dracula ubangina Luer & Andreetta

Synonyms
- Dracula vampira var. ubangina (Luer & Andreetta) O. Gruss & M. Wolff

= Dracula ubangina =

Species of orchid

Dracula ubangina is a species of orchid. It was classified in the 1980s and is native to Ecuador.
