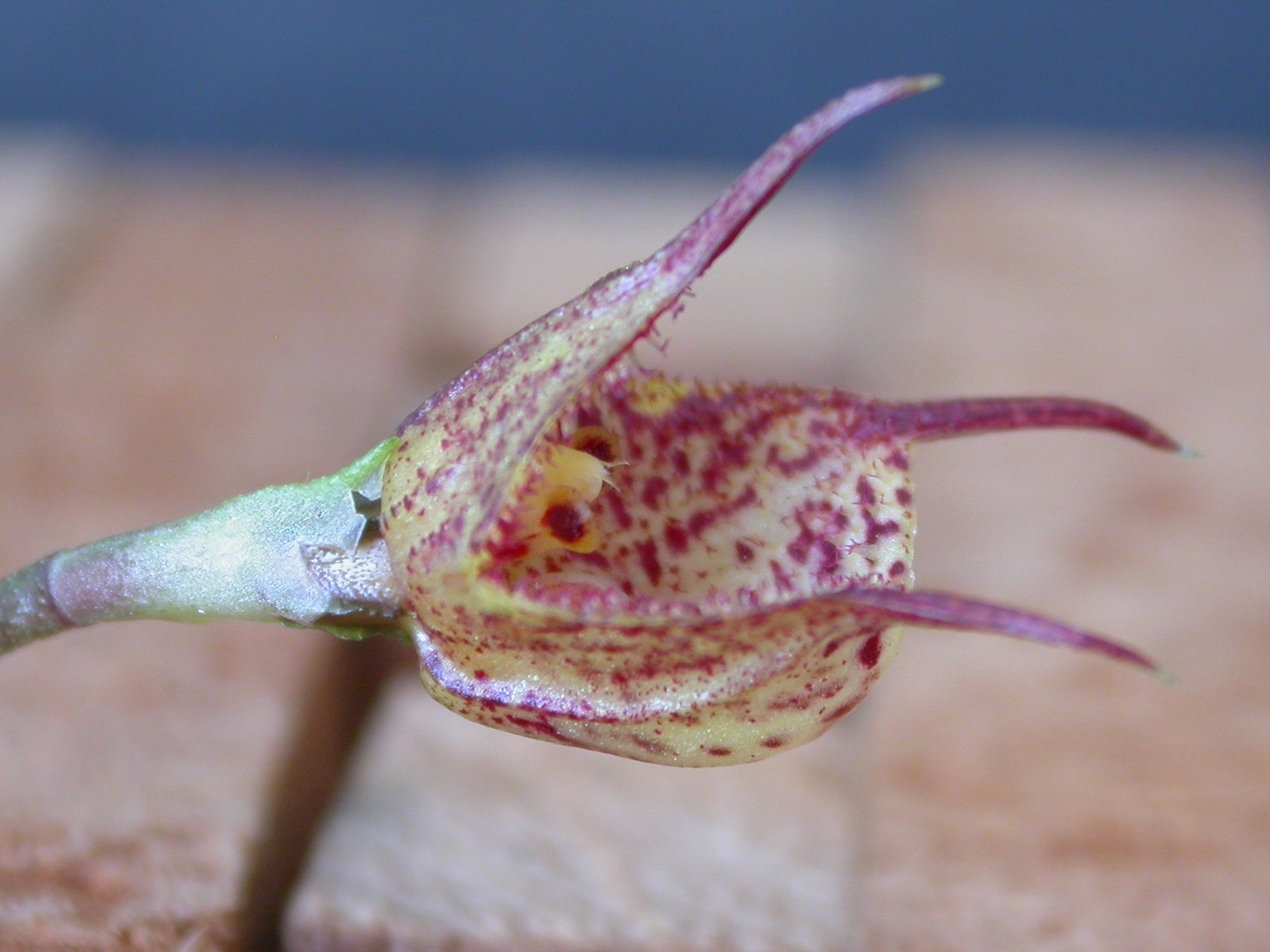

Scientific classification
- Kingdom: Plantae
- Clade: Embryophytes
- Clade: Tracheophytes
- Clade: Angiosperms
- Clade: Monocots
- Order: Asparagales
- Family: Orchidaceae
- Subfamily: Epidendroideae
- Genus: Dracula
- Species: D. mopsus

Binomial name
- Dracula mopsus (F.Lehm. & Kraenzl.) Luer

Synonyms
- Masdevallia mopsus Schltr. (Basionym)

= Dracula mopsus =

Species of orchid

Dracula mopsus is a species of orchid.
