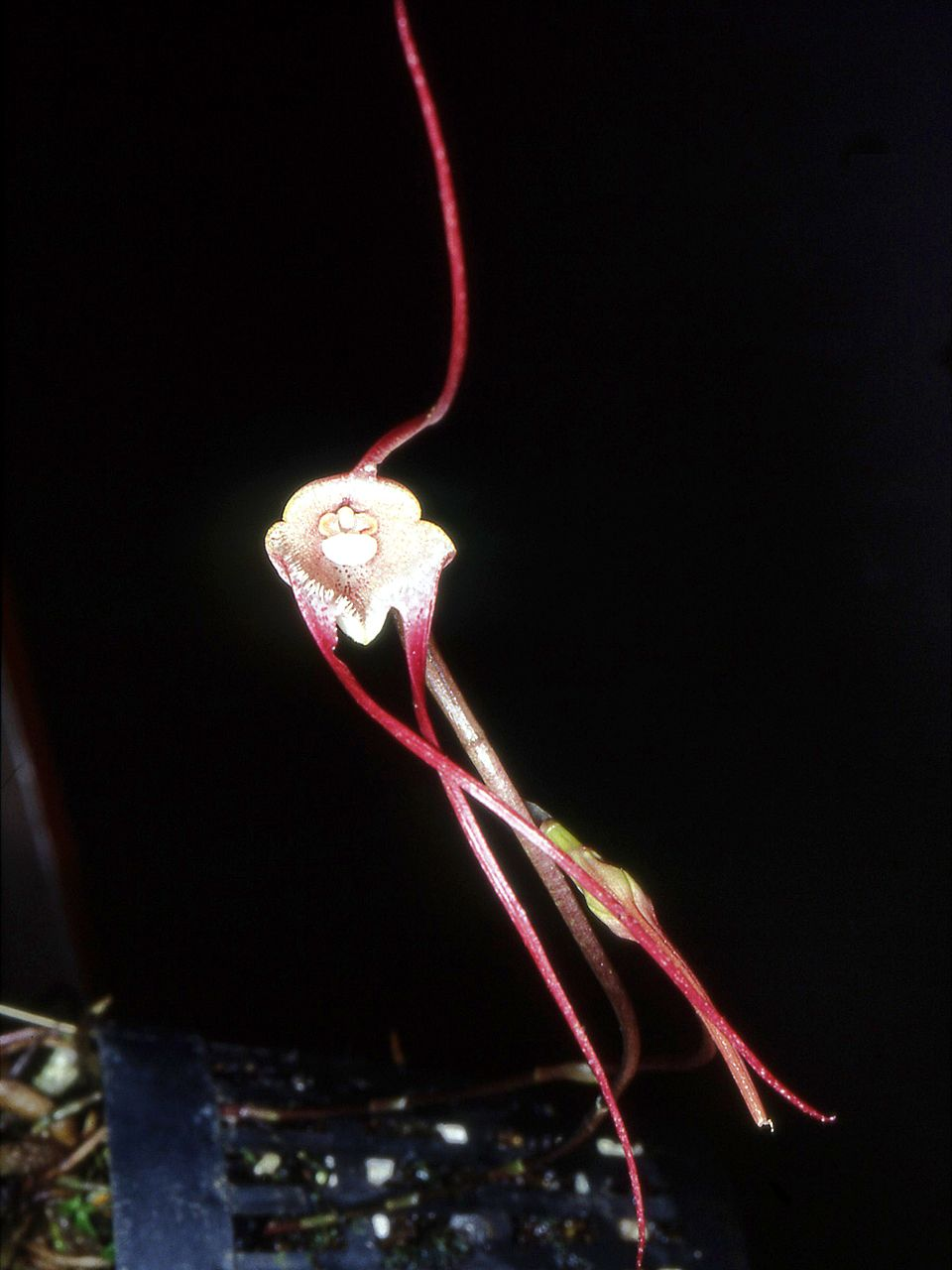

Scientific classification
- Kingdom: Plantae
- Clade: Embryophytes
- Clade: Tracheophytes
- Clade: Angiosperms
- Clade: Monocots
- Order: Asparagales
- Family: Orchidaceae
- Subfamily: Epidendroideae
- Genus: Dracula
- Species: D. psittacina

Binomial name
- Dracula psittacina (Rchb.f.) Luer & R. Escobar

Synonyms
- Masdevallia psittacina Rchb.f. (Basionym)

= Dracula psittacina =

Species of plant

Dracula psittacina is a species of orchid.
