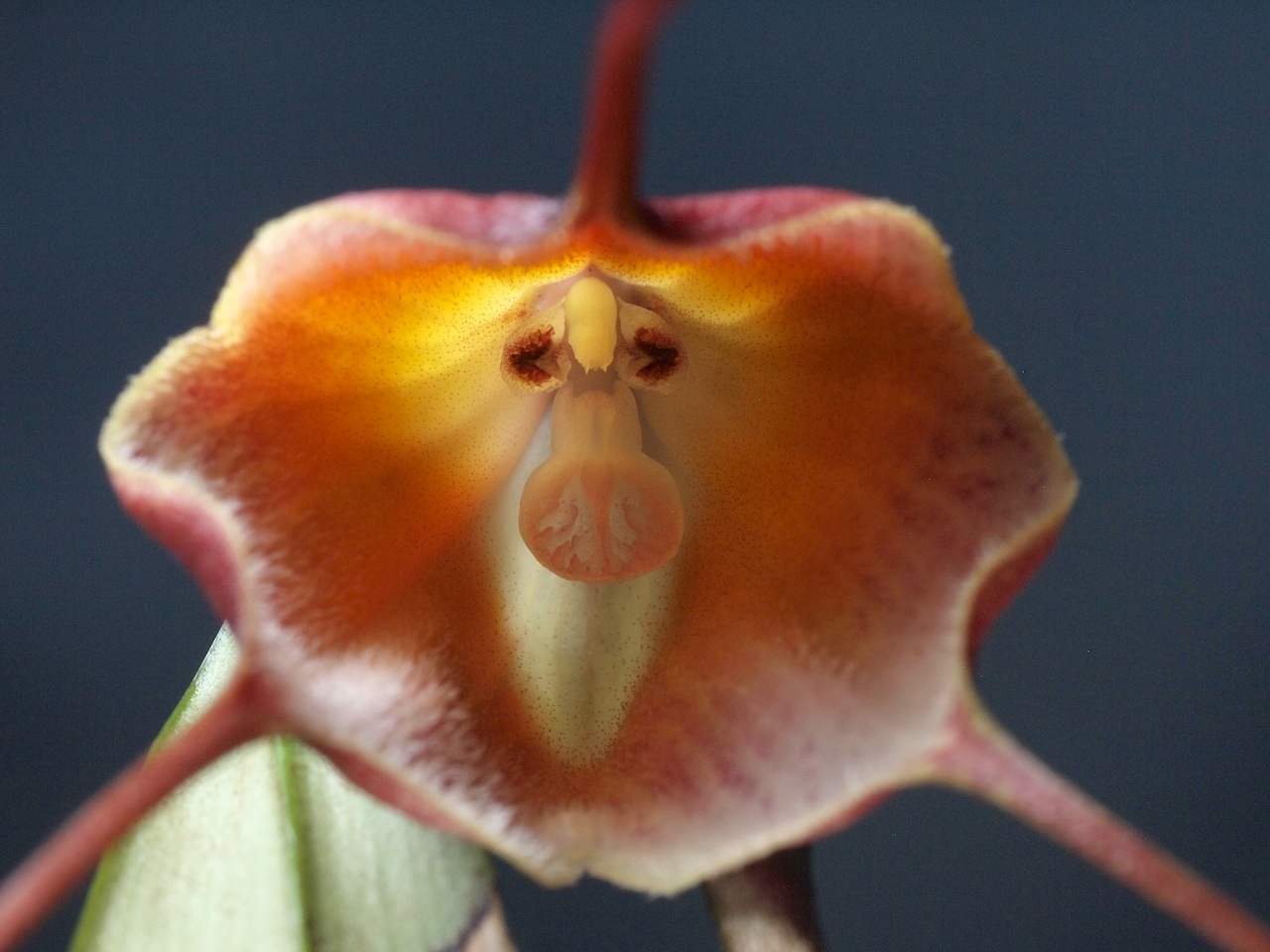
- Close-up of flower
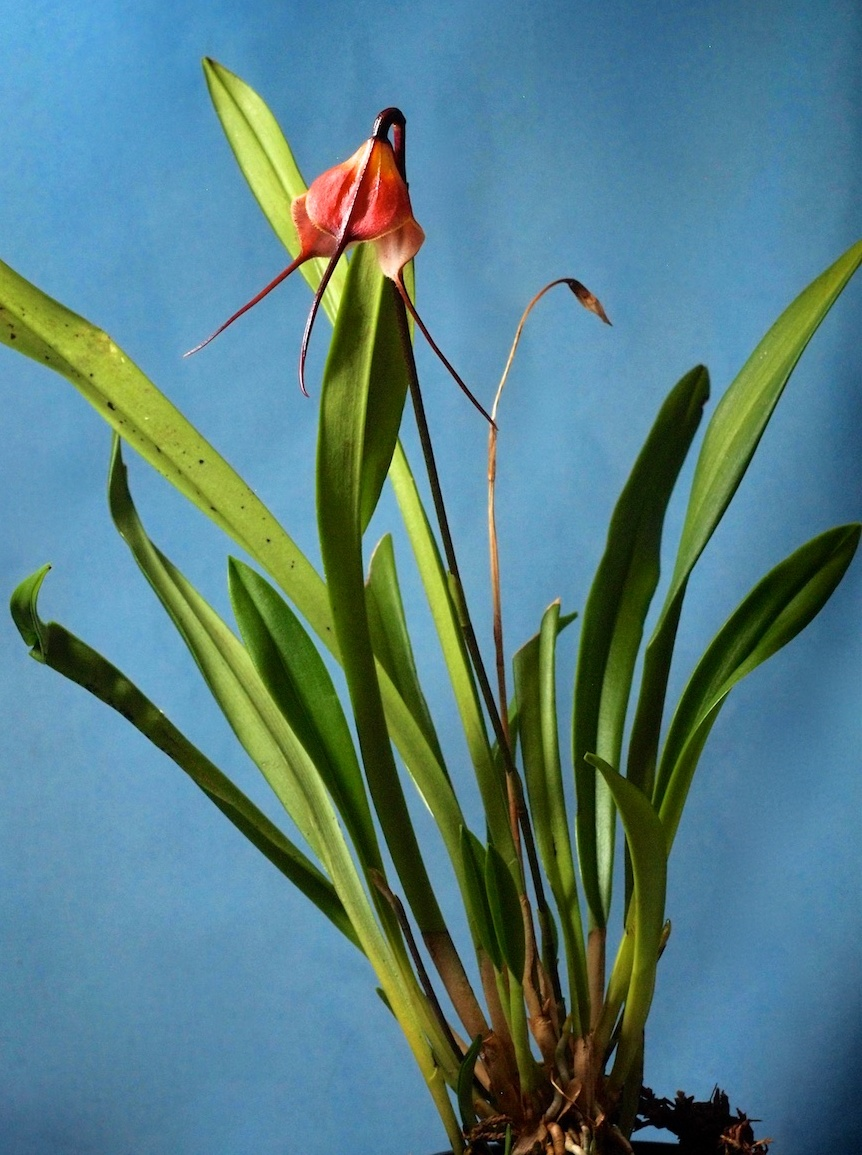
- Habit

Scientific classification
- Kingdom: Plantae
- Clade: Embryophytes
- Clade: Tracheophytes
- Clade: Spermatophytes
- Clade: Angiosperms
- Clade: Monocots
- Order: Asparagales
- Family: Orchidaceae
- Subfamily: Epidendroideae
- Genus: Dracula
- Species: D. sijmii

Binomial name
- Dracula sijmii Luer

= Dracula sijmii =

Species of plant

Dracula sijmii is a species of flowering plant in the family Orchidaceae. It is probably native to Ecuador. An epiphyte of the wet tropics, there is speculation that it is a hybrid species, with its parents being Dracula erythrocodon (75%) and D. fuliginosa (25%).
