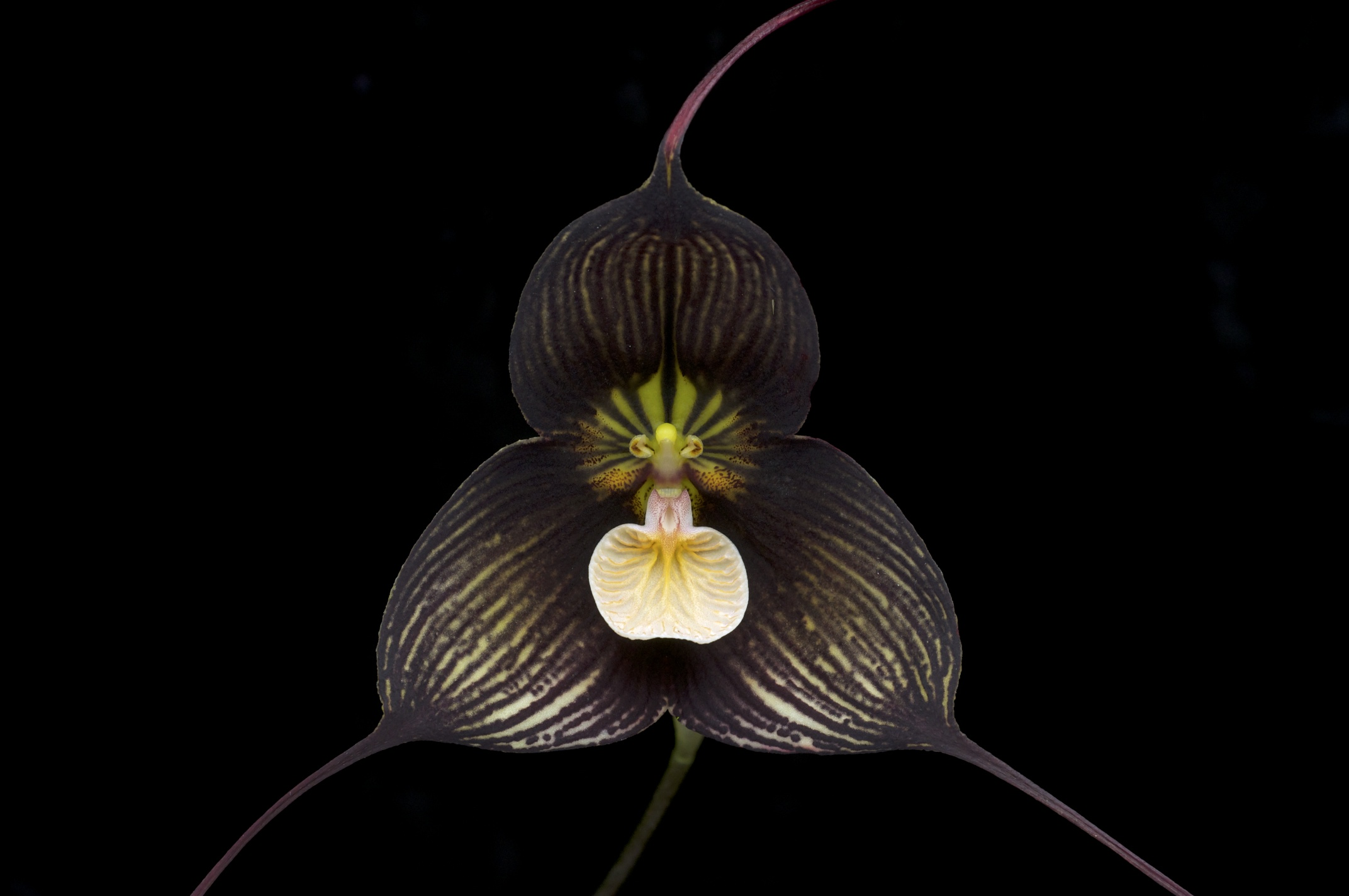
- Dracula vampira

Scientific classification
- Kingdom: Plantae
- Clade: Embryophytes
- Clade: Tracheophytes
- Clade: Spermatophytes
- Clade: Angiosperms
- Clade: Monocots
- Order: Asparagales
- Family: Orchidaceae
- Subfamily: Epidendroideae
- Tribe: Epidendreae
- Subtribe: Pleurothallidinae
- Genus: Dracula; Luer, 1978

Type species
- Masdevallia chimaera (syn of Dracula chimaera) Rchb. f.

Species
- See text

= Dracula (plant) =

Dracula orchids

Genus of orchid

The orchid genus Dracula, abbreviated as Drac in horticultural trade, consists of 118 species native to Mexico, Central America, Colombia, Ecuador and Peru. The name Dracula literally means "little dragon", an allusion to the mythical Count Dracula, a lead character in numerous vampire novels and films. The name was applied to the orchid because of the blood-red color of several of the species, and the strange aspect of the long spurs of the sepals. The plants were once included in the genus Masdevallia, but became a separate genus in 1978. This genus has been placed in the subtribe Pleurothallidinae.

== Description ==
They are epiphytic and terrestrial species distributed in Central America and the northwest Andes. Almost half the species are found in Ecuador. They prefer shade and rather cool temperatures.

These caespitose orchids grow in tufts from a short rhizome, with a dense pack of stems. They lack pseudobulbs. On each stem grows one large, thin, plicate leaf with a sharply defined midrib. These glabrous, light to dark green leaves may be spongy, taking over the function of the missing pseudobulb. They are tipped with a mucro (a short tip).

The flower stalks grow either horizontally from the base of the plant or descend, often for great distances. A few species grow upright flower stalks. The long-tailed terminal flowers are basically triangular. The flowers are borne singly or successively. Three species (sodiroi, decussata/neisseniae, and papillosa) may have up to three simultaneously open flowers on a single stalk. In general, though, if there is more than one flower bud on the raceme, they open up with long intervals. These flowers have a weird aspect, due to the long tails on each sepal. The petals are small and somewhat thickened. Quite commonly, various species of Dracula are known for blooms resembling the faces of primates, a notable example being Dracula simia. However, this likeness to monkeys' faces seems to be purely a natural coincidence to the primates living in the same forests. In fact, these flowers are pollinated by the common fungus gnat; the bloom's lip is often quite large (for a pleurothallid), and from the fungus gnat's perspective, resembles an irresistible mushroom or fungus. Research by biologists at the University of Oregon indicates that D. lafleurii also possesses a uniquely volatile chemistry, similar to localized species of mushrooms. This mimicry attracts mushroom-associated flies which play a role in pollination. The basal part of the lip (hypochile) is cleft. The terminal part (epichile) is rounded and concave. The margins of the perianth are often fringed. There is a well-developed column with two pollinia.

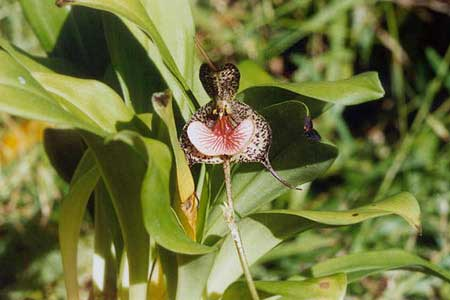
Dracula chestertonii

== Taxonomy ==
The species of Dracula have tentatively been divided into three subgenera, with sections and subsections within one of the subgenera.

- Subgenus Dracula : This subgenus contains all the species of the genus except two exceptional species (D. sodiroi and D. xenos)
  - Section Andreettaea : Monotypic: Dracula andreettae
  - Section Chestertonia : two species: Dracula chestertonii, D. cutis-bufonis
  - Section Cochliopsia : Monotypic: Dracula cochliops
  - Section Dodsonia : Four species: Dracula dodsonii, D. insolita, D. iricolor, D. portillae
  - Section Dracula : largest section
    - Subsection Costatae : e.g. Dracula bella, D. vespertilio
    - Subsection Dracula :
      - Series Dracula : e.g. Dracula chimaera, D. tubeana, D. vampira
      - Series Grandiflorae-Parvilabiatae : e.g. Dracula gigas, D. platycrater
      - Series Parviflorae : e.g. Dracula houtteana, D. lotax
- Subgenus Sodiroa : Two Dracula sodiroi, D. erythrocodon
- Subgenus Xenosia : Monotypic : Dracula xenos

- Dracula adrianae (Colombia)
- Dracula alcithoe (SW. Colombia to NE. Ecuador)
- Dracula amaliae (W. Colombia)
- Dracula andreettae (W. Colombia to NE. Ecuador)
- Dracula anthracina (NW. Colombia)
- Dracula antonii (Colombia)
- Dracula aphrodes (W. Colombia)
- Dracula astuta (Costa Rica)
- Dracula barrowii (Peru)
- Dracula bella (WC. Colombia)
- Dracula bellerophon (W. Colombia)
- Dracula benedictii (WC. Colombia)
- Dracula berthae (Colombia)
- Dracula brangeri (C. Colombia)
- Dracula callithrix (Colombia)
- Dracula carcinopsis (W. Colombia)
- Dracula carlueri (Costa Rica)
- Dracula chestertonii (W. Colombia)
- Dracula chimaera (W. Colombia)
- Dracula chiroptera (SW. Colombia to NE. Ecuador)
- Dracula christineana (Ecuador)
- Dracula circe (Colombia)
- Dracula citrina (Colombia)
- Dracula cochliops (SW. Colombia)

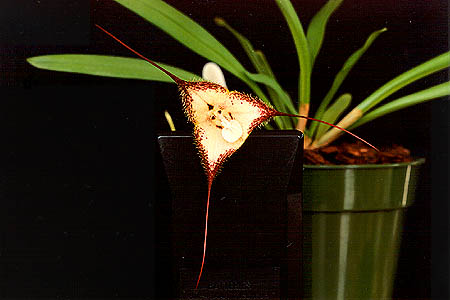
Dracula cordobae

- Dracula cordobae (SW. Ecuador)
- Dracula cutis-bufonis (NW. Colombia)
- Dracula dalessandroi (SE. Ecuador)
- Dracula dalstroemii (NW. Ecuador)
- Dracula decussata (Colombia)
- Dracula deltoidea (SE. Ecuador)
- Dracula deniseana (Peru)
- Dracula diabola (Colombia)
- Dracula diana (W. Colombia)
- Dracula dodsonii (Colombia to NC. Ecuador)
- Dracula erythrochaete (Costa Rica to W. Panama)
- Dracula erythrocodon (Ecuador)
- Dracula exasperata ( SW. Colombia)
- Dracula fafnir (SE. Ecuador)
- Dracula felix (SW. Colombia to NW. Ecuador)
- Dracula fuligifera (C. Ecuador)
- Dracula gastrophora (Ecuador)
- Dracula gigas (W. Colombia to NW. Ecuador)
- Dracula gorgona (W. Colombia)
- Dracula gorgonella (Colombia)
- Dracula hawleyi (NW. Ecuador)
- Dracula hirsuta (SE. Ecuador)
- Dracula hirtzii (SW. Colombia to NW. Ecuador)

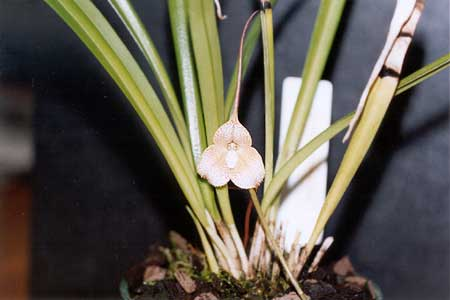
Dracula houtteana

- Dracula houtteana (Colombia)
- Dracula immunda (Panama)
- Dracula inaequalis (W. Colombia)
- Dracula incognita (Colombia)
- Dracula inexperata (Costa Rica)
- Dracula insolita (W. Colombia)
- Dracula janetiae (C. Peru)
- Dracula kareniae (Ecuador)
- Dracula lafleurii (NW. Ecuador)
- Dracula lehmanniana (SW. Colombia)
- Dracula lemurella (Colombia)
- Dracula leonum (Peru)
- Dracula levii (SW. Colombia to NW. Ecuador)
- Dracula ligiae (Colombia)
- Dracula lindstroemii (NW. Ecuador)
- Dracula lotax (Ecuador)
- Dracula mantissa (SW. Colombia to NW. Ecuador)
- Dracula marsupialis (NW. Ecuador)
- Dracula mendozae Luer & V.N.M.Rao (Ecuador)
- Dracula minax (Colombia)
- Dracula mopsus (Ecuador)
- Dracula morleyi (NW. Ecuador)
- Dracula navarrorum (Ecuador)
- Dracula nigritella (Ecuador)
- Dracula nosferatu (Colombia)
- Dracula nycterina (Colombia)
- Dracula octavioi (SW. Colombia)
- Dracula olmosii (Panama)

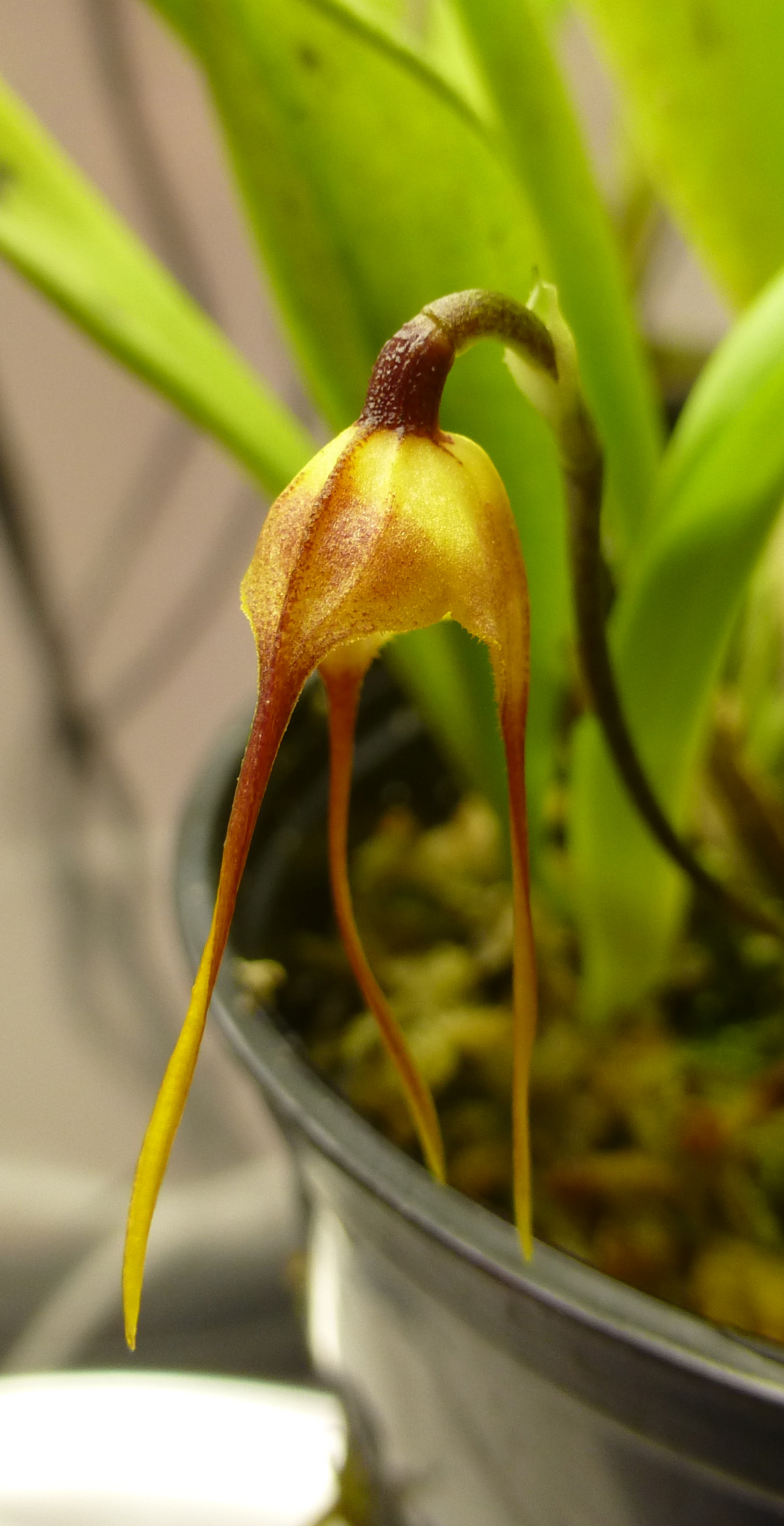
Dracula olmosii

- Dracula ophioceps (SW. Colombia)
- Dracula orientalis (NE. Colombia)
- Dracula ortiziana (W. Colombia)
- Dracula papillosa (NW. Ecuador)
- Dracula pholeodytes (NE. Colombia)
- Dracula pileus (W. Colombia)
- Dracula platycrater (Colombia)
- Dracula polyphemus (NW. Ecuador)
- Dracula portillae (SE. Ecuador)
- Dracula posadarum (Colombia)
- Dracula presbys (Colombia)
- Dracula psittacina (Colombia)
- Dracula psyche (NW. Ecuador)
- Dracula pubescens (Ecuador)
- Dracula pusilla (SE. Mexico to C. America)
- Dracula radiella (NW. Ecuador)
- Dracula radiosa (E. Colombia to NW. Ecuador)
- Dracula rezekiana (Ecuador)
- Dracula ripleyana (Costa Rica)
- Dracula robledorum (Colombia)
- Dracula rojasii (Colombia)
- Dracula roezlii (W. Colombia)
- Dracula saulii (Peru)
- Dracula schudelii (Ecuador)
- Dracula senex-furens(Colombia)
- Dracula sergioi (Colombia)
- Dracula severa (NW. Colombia)
- Dracula sibundoyensis (SW. Colombia to NW. Ecuador)
- Dracula sijmii (Ecuador)
- Dracula simia (SE. Ecuador)

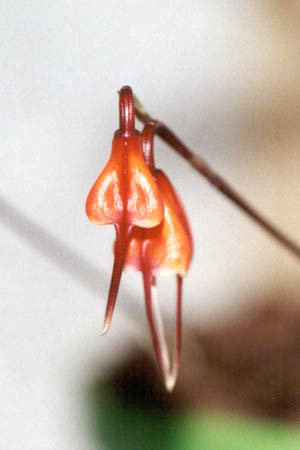
Dracula sodiroi

- Dracula sodiroi (Ecuador)
- Dracula syndactyla (SW. Colombia)
- Dracula terborchii (Ecuador)
- Dracula trichroma (W. Colombia to NW. Ecuador)
- Dracula trinympharum (NW. Ecuador)
- Dracula tsubotae (Colombia)
- Dracula tubeana (Ecuador)
- Dracula ubangina (Ecuador)
- Dracula vampira (Ecuador)
- Dracula veliziana (Colombia)
- Dracula velutina (NW. Colombia)
- Dracula venefica (W. Colombia)
- Dracula venosa (W. Colombia to NW. Ecuador)
- Dracula verticulosa (W. Colombia)
- Dracula vespertilio (Nicaragua to NW. Ecuador)
- Dracula villegasii (Colombia)
- Dracula vinacea (NE. Colombia)
- Dracula vlad-tepes (NE. Colombia)
- Dracula wallisii (W. Colombia)
- Dracula woolwardiae (Ecuador)
- Dracula xenos (Colombia)

== Hybrids ==
- Dracula × anicula (D. cutis-bufonis × D. wallisii) (Colombia).
- Dracula × radiosyndactyla (D. radiosa × D. syndactyla) (SW. Colombia).
