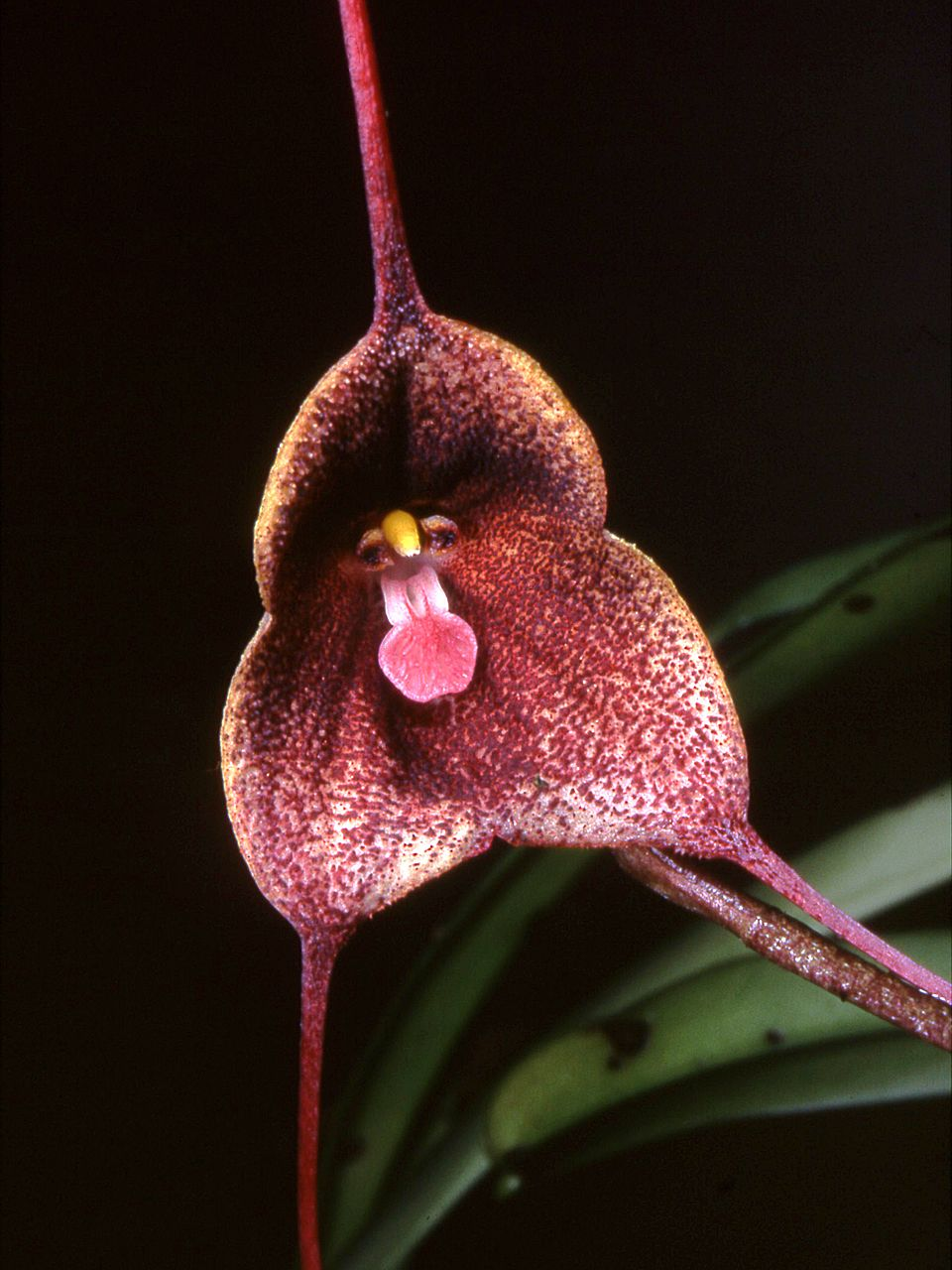

Scientific classification
- Kingdom: Plantae
- Clade: Tracheophytes
- Clade: Angiosperms
- Clade: Monocots
- Order: Asparagales
- Family: Orchidaceae
- Subfamily: Epidendroideae
- Genus: Dracula
- Species: D. diabola

Binomial name
- Dracula diabola Luer & R.Escobar

= Dracula diabola =

Species of orchid

Dracula diabola is a species of orchid that only grows in a single valley in the Boyacá Department, northeast of Bogotá, Colombia. Its specific epithet, diabola, comes from diabolus, the Latin word for devil. The plant is an epiphyte growing at an altitude of 2200–2600 m in the Eastern Cordillera.
