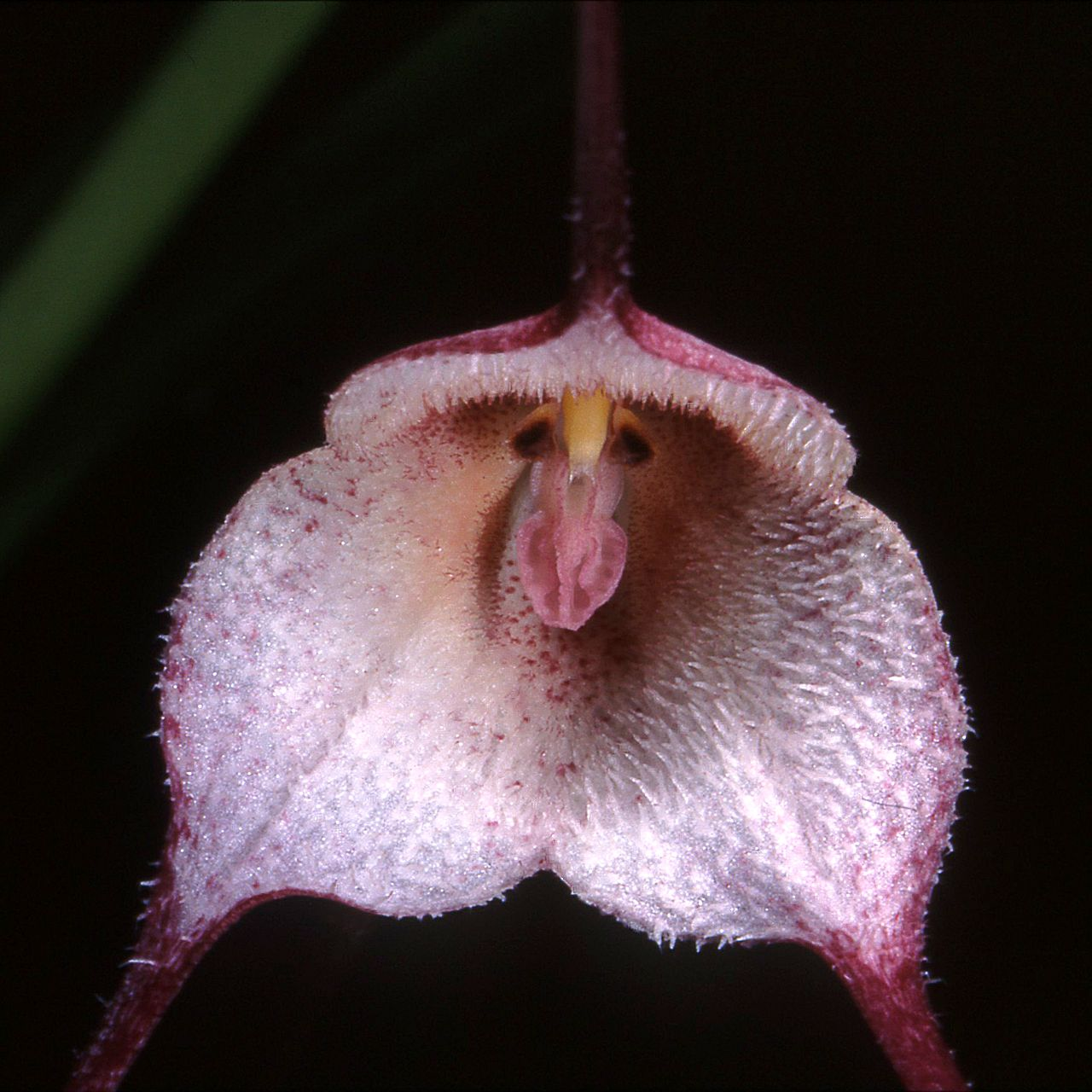

Scientific classification
- Kingdom: Plantae
- Clade: Embryophytes
- Clade: Tracheophytes
- Clade: Angiosperms
- Clade: Monocots
- Order: Asparagales
- Family: Orchidaceae
- Subfamily: Epidendroideae
- Genus: Dracula
- Species: D. velutina

Binomial name
- Dracula velutina (Rchb.f.) Luer

Synonyms
- Masdevallia velutina Rchb.f. (Basionym); Masdevallia microglochin Rchb.f.; Masdevallia trinema Rchb.f.; Masdevallia lactea Kraenzl.; Dracula lactea (Kraenzl.) Luer; Dracula microglochin (Rchb.f.) Luer; Dracula trinema (Rchb.f.) Luer

= Dracula velutina =

Species of orchid

Dracula velutina is a species of orchid.
