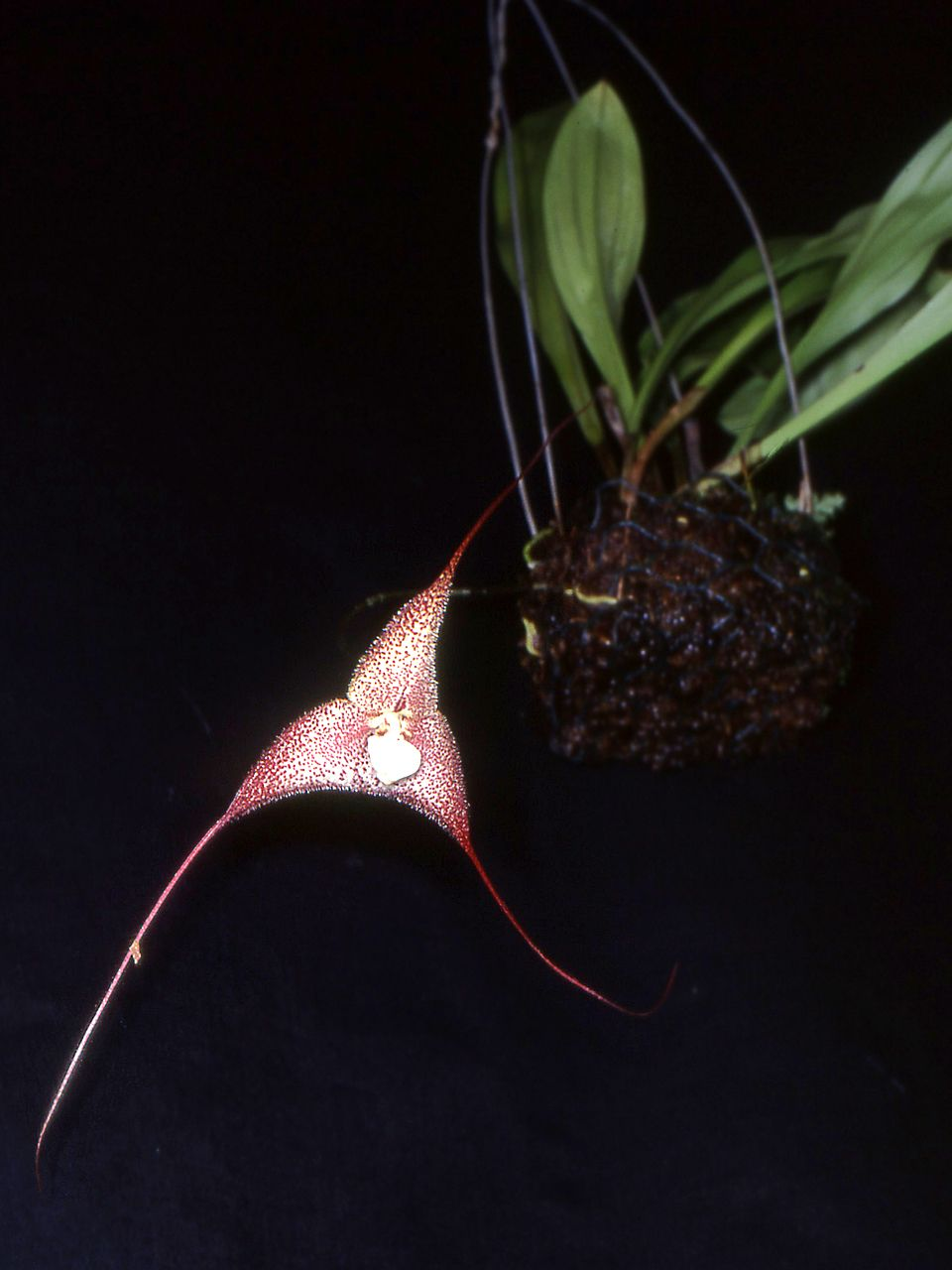

Scientific classification
- Kingdom: Plantae
- Clade: Embryophytes
- Clade: Tracheophytes
- Clade: Angiosperms
- Clade: Monocots
- Order: Asparagales
- Family: Orchidaceae
- Subfamily: Epidendroideae
- Genus: Dracula
- Species: D. polyphemus

Binomial name
- Dracula polyphemus (Luer) Luer

Synonyms
- Masdevallia polyphemus Luer (Basionym)

= Dracula polyphemus =

Species of orchid

Dracula polyphemus is a species of orchid.
