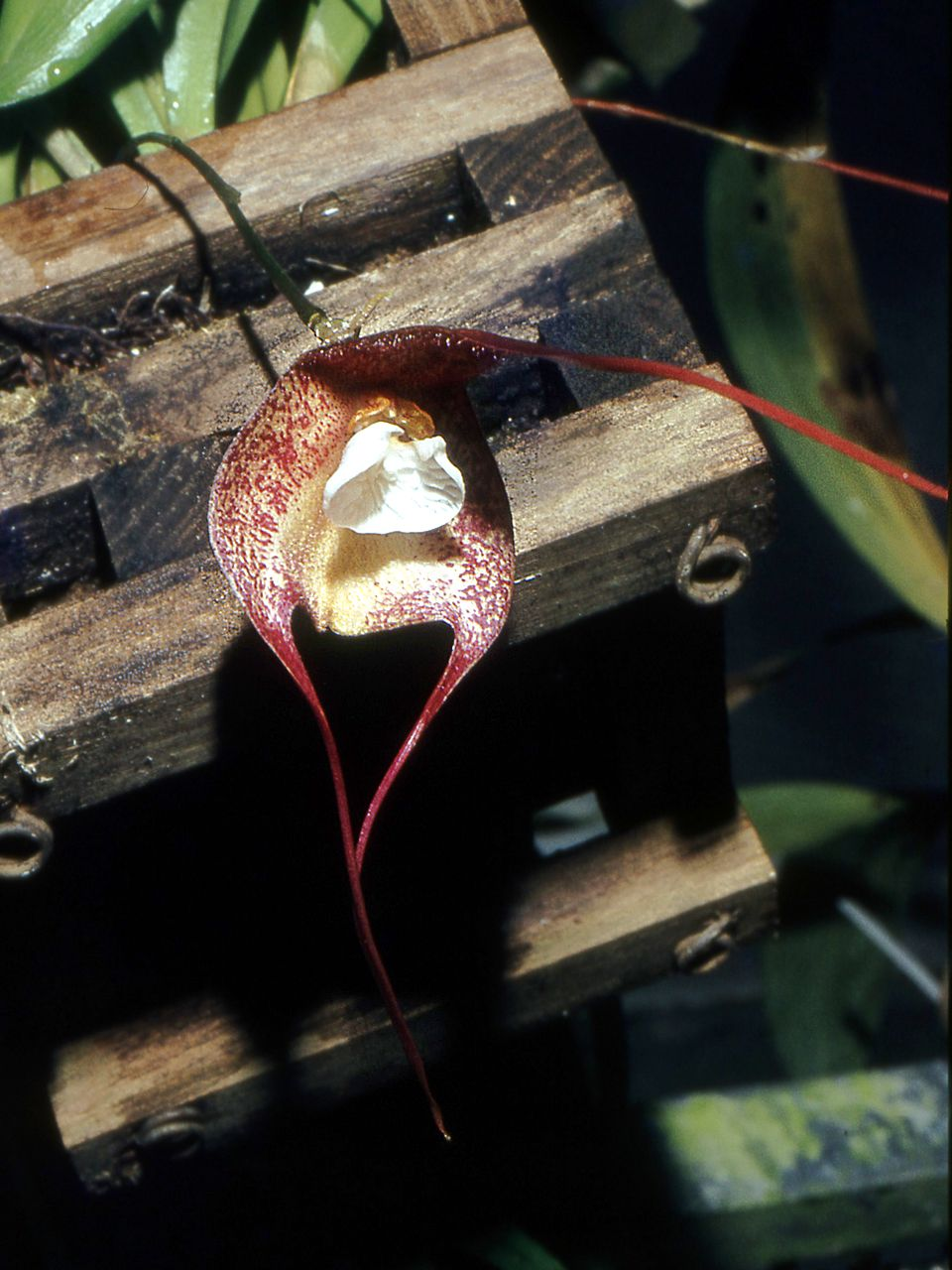

Scientific classification
- Kingdom: Plantae
- Clade: Tracheophytes
- Clade: Angiosperms
- Clade: Monocots
- Order: Asparagales
- Family: Orchidaceae
- Subfamily: Epidendroideae
- Genus: Dracula
- Species: D. bella

Binomial name
- Dracula bella (Rchb.f.) Luer 1978

Synonyms
- Masdevallia bella Rchb.f. (Basionym, 1878)

= Dracula bella =

Species of orchid

Dracula bella is a species of orchid endemic to Colombia.
