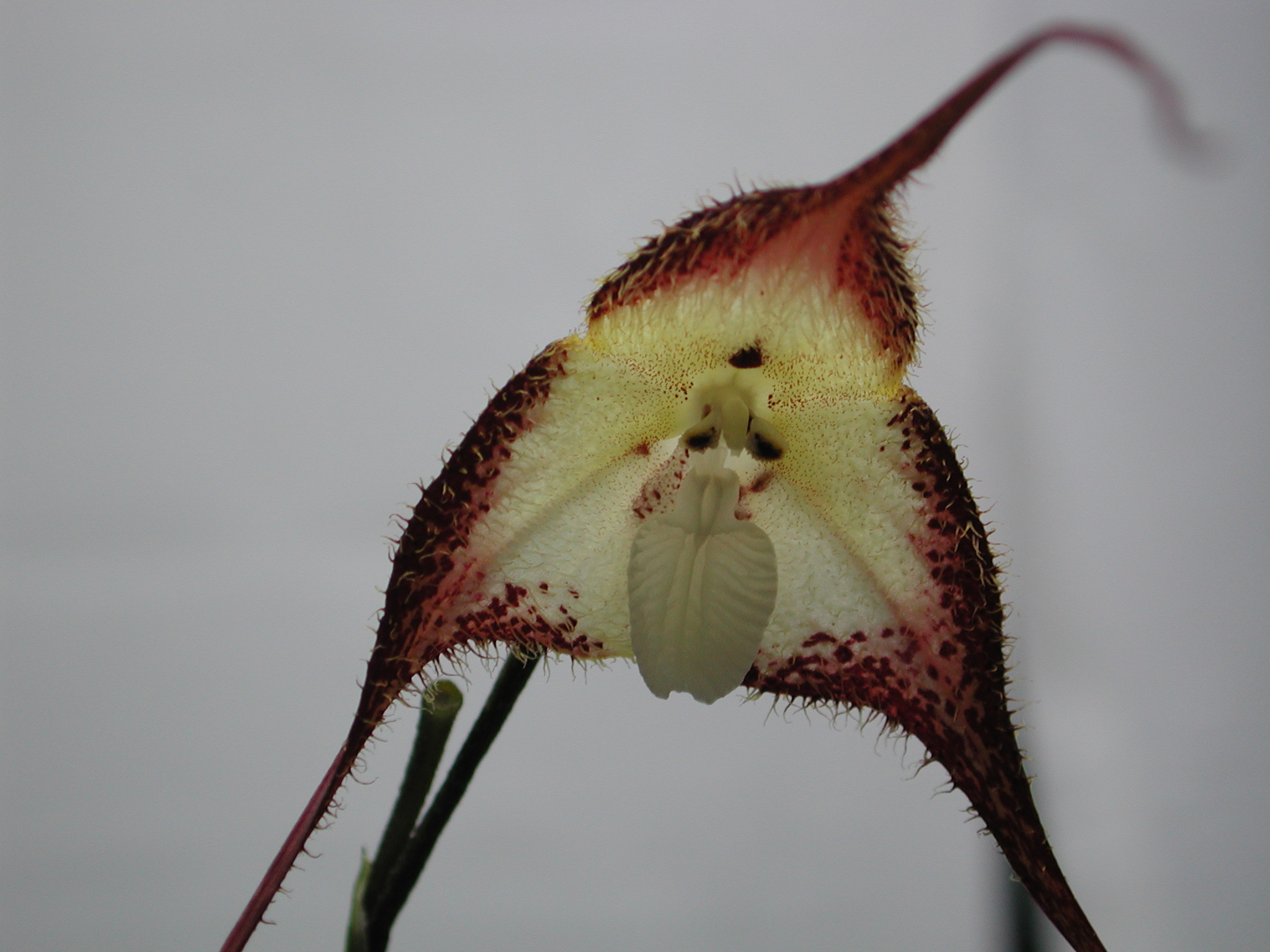

Conservation status
- Vulnerable (IUCN 2.3)

Scientific classification
- Kingdom: Plantae
- Clade: Tracheophytes
- Clade: Angiosperms
- Clade: Monocots
- Order: Asparagales
- Family: Orchidaceae
- Subfamily: Epidendroideae
- Genus: Dracula
- Species: D. cordobae

Binomial name
- Dracula cordobae Luer 1979

= Dracula cordobae =

Species of orchid

Dracula cordobae is a species of orchid found in the montane cloud forest of south western Ecuador at elevations of 750 to 1000 meters.

== Description ==
It is a medium-sized orchid, with an epiphyte habit and with very short ramicaules basally wrapped by 2 to 3 acuminate tubular sheaths and bearing a single, apical, narrowly obovate leaf that is conduplicated below the petiole. It blooms in a lateral inflorescence, from the base of the ramicaule, with successively a single flower that heads below the plant.

== Taxonomy ==
The type species was discovered by Sr. Clever Córdova in El Oro, Ecuador at 800 meters, July 19, 1979 and described in the journal Selbyana by Carlyle A. Luer
