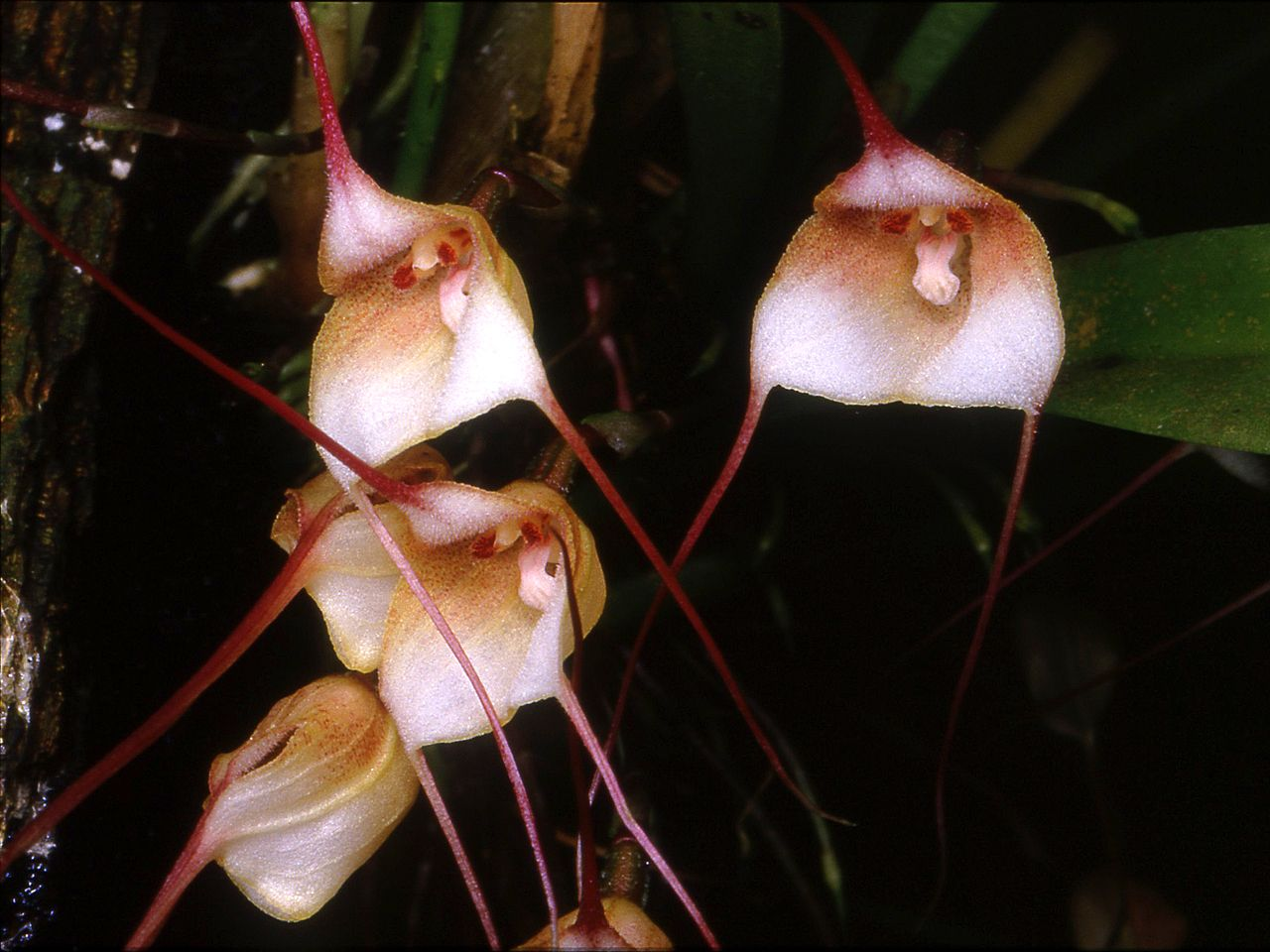

Scientific classification
- Kingdom: Plantae
- Clade: Tracheophytes
- Clade: Angiosperms
- Clade: Monocots
- Order: Asparagales
- Family: Orchidaceae
- Subfamily: Epidendroideae
- Genus: Dracula
- Species: D. venosa

Binomial name
- Dracula venosa (Rolfe) Luer

Synonyms
- Masdevallia venosa Rolfe (basionym)

= Dracula venosa =

Species of orchid

Dracula venosa is a species of orchid.
