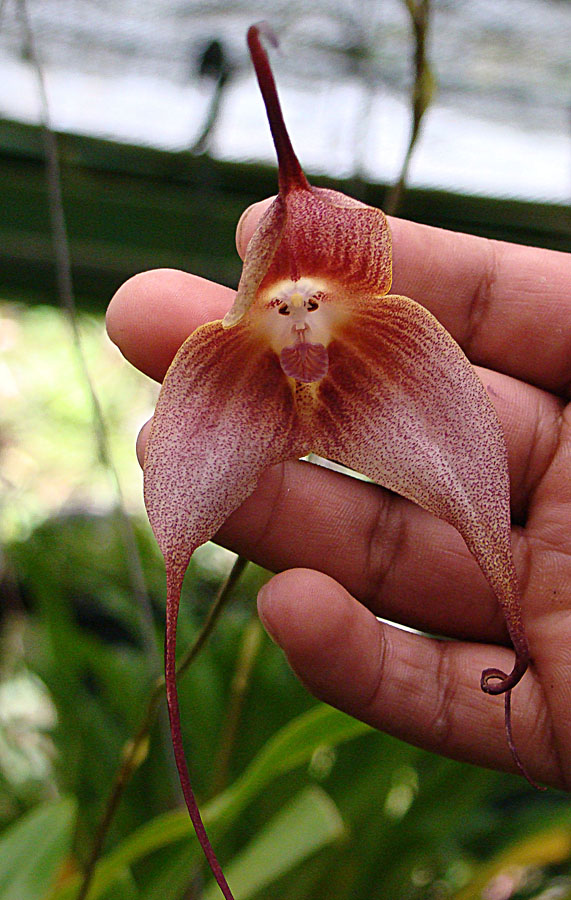

Scientific classification
- Kingdom: Plantae
- Clade: Tracheophytes
- Clade: Angiosperms
- Clade: Monocots
- Order: Asparagales
- Family: Orchidaceae
- Subfamily: Epidendroideae
- Genus: Dracula
- Species: D. simia

Binomial name
- Dracula simia (Luer) Luer

Synonyms
- Masdevallia simia Luer

= Dracula simia =

Species of plant

Dracula simia, known also as the monkey-like Dracula, is an epiphytic orchid originally described as part of the genus Masdevallia, but later reclassified as part of genus Dracula. The arrangement of column, petals and lip resembles a monkey's face. The plant blooms at any season with several flowers on the inflorescence that open successively. Flowers are fragrant with the scent of a ripe orange. The monkey orchid is native to the cloud forests of Ecuador. Currently, this orchid is in danger of extinction due to habitat destruction and over-collection.

== See also ==
- Monkey orchid (disambiguation)
