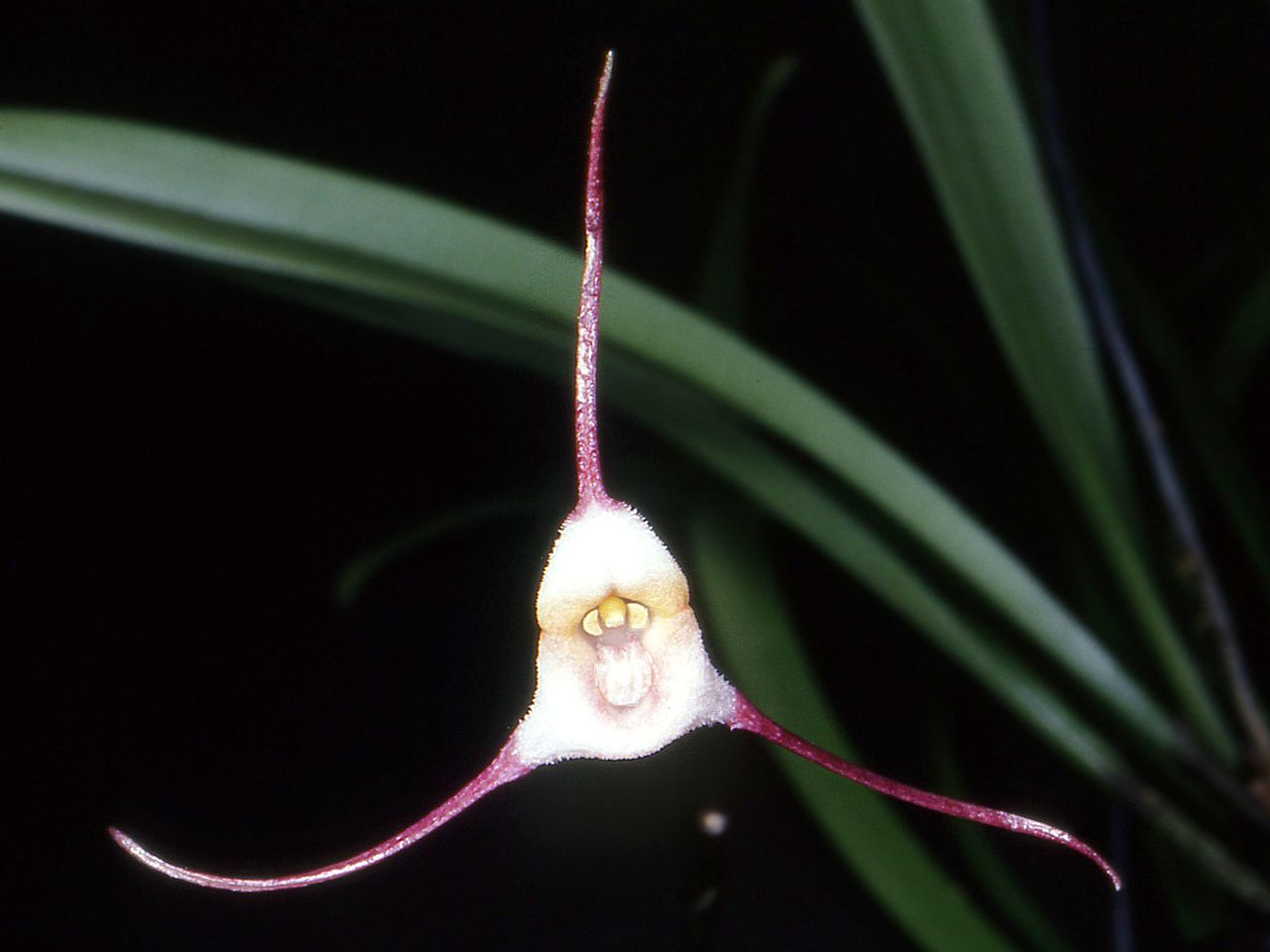

Scientific classification
- Kingdom: Plantae
- Clade: Embryophytes
- Clade: Tracheophytes
- Clade: Angiosperms
- Clade: Monocots
- Order: Asparagales
- Family: Orchidaceae
- Subfamily: Epidendroideae
- Genus: Dracula
- Species: D. sergioi

Binomial name
- Dracula sergioi Luer & R. Escobar

= Dracula sergioi =

Species of orchid

Dracula sergioi is an epiphytic species of orchid in the genus Dracula. Most dracula orchids grow in Antioquia, Colombia at elevations around 1950 meters.
