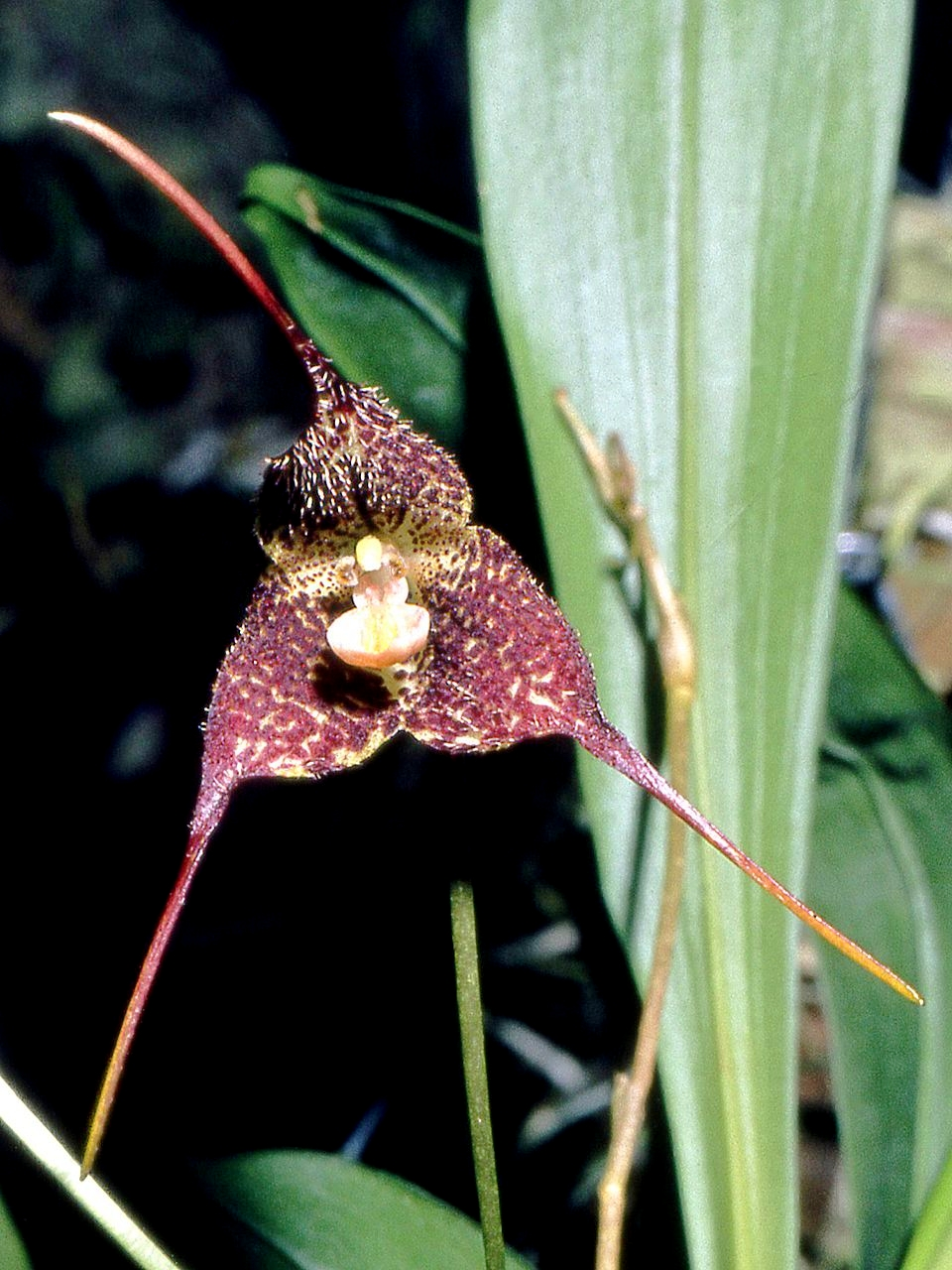

Scientific classification
- Kingdom: Plantae
- Clade: Tracheophytes
- Clade: Angiosperms
- Clade: Monocots
- Order: Asparagales
- Family: Orchidaceae
- Subfamily: Epidendroideae
- Genus: Dracula
- Species: D. minax

Binomial name
- Dracula minax Luer & R. Escobar

= Dracula minax =

Species of orchid

Dracula minax is an epiphytic species of orchid found in Colombia. Its flowers have a 5 cm diameter.
