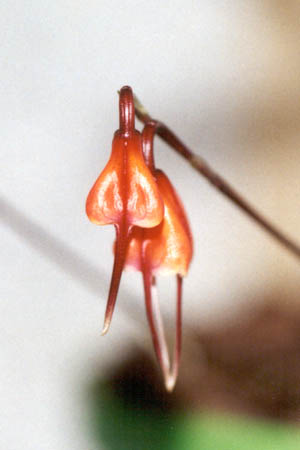

Scientific classification
- Kingdom: Plantae
- Clade: Embryophytes
- Clade: Tracheophytes
- Clade: Spermatophytes
- Clade: Angiosperms
- Clade: Monocots
- Order: Asparagales
- Family: Orchidaceae
- Subfamily: Epidendroideae
- Genus: Dracula
- Species: D. sodiroi

Binomial name
- Dracula sodiroi (Schltr.) Luer

Synonyms
- Masdevallia sodiroi Schltr.in Repert. Spec. Nov. Regni Veg. 14: 120 (1915) (Basionym)

= Dracula sodiroi =

Species of orchid

Dracula sodiroi is a species of orchid. It is an epiphyte and grows in wet tropical areas of north-western and northern Ecuador.

The specific epithet of sodiroi refers to Luis Sodiro (1836–1909), who was an Italian Jesuit priest and a field botanist, who collected many plants in Ecuador.

It was first published in Selbyana vol.2 on page 197 in 1978.
