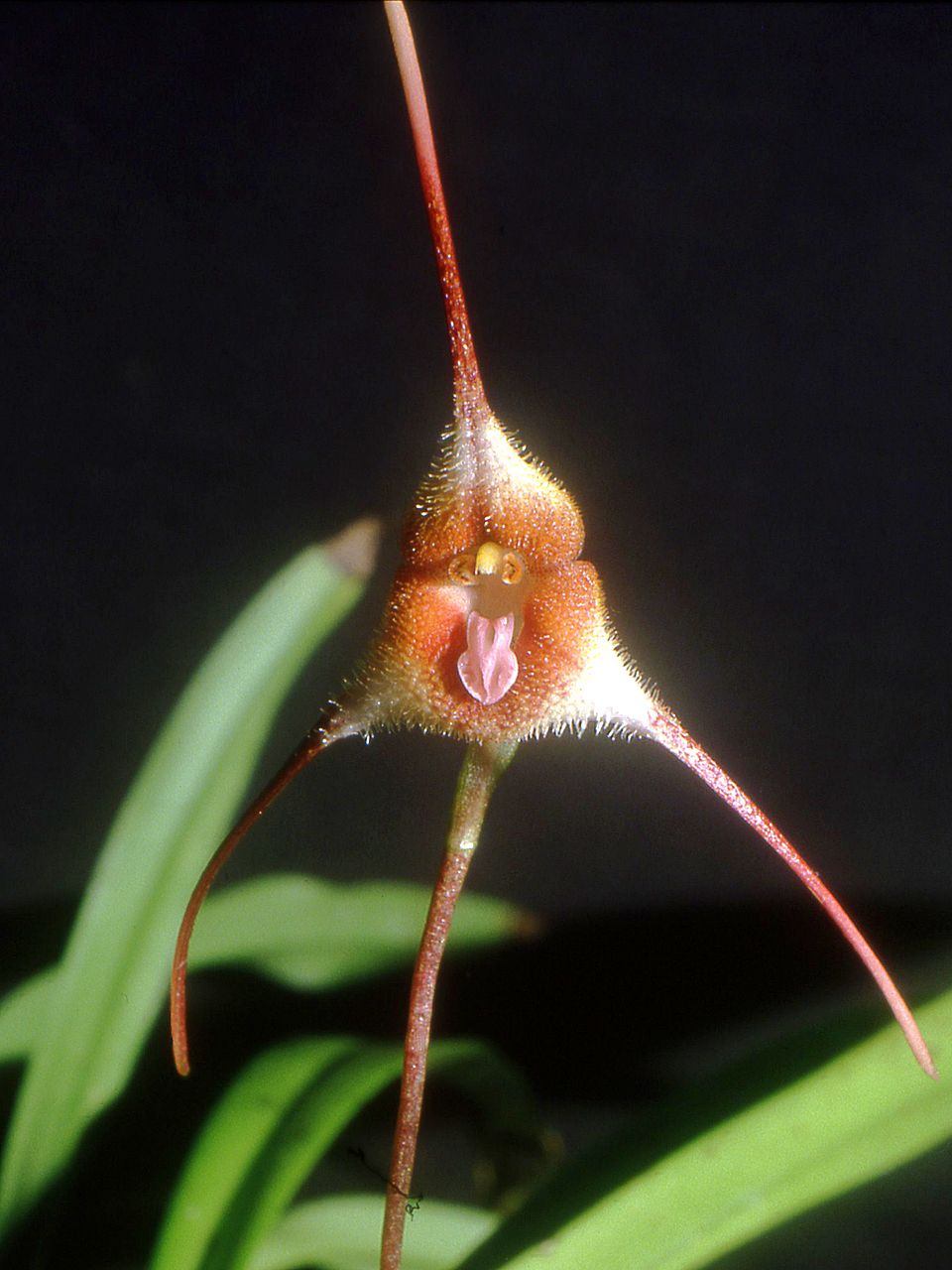

Scientific classification
- Kingdom: Plantae
- Clade: Tracheophytes
- Clade: Angiosperms
- Clade: Monocots
- Order: Asparagales
- Family: Orchidaceae
- Subfamily: Epidendroideae
- Genus: Dracula
- Species: D. posadarum

Binomial name
- Dracula posadarum (Luer & R. Escobar)

= Dracula posadarum =

Species of orchid

Dracula posadarum or the Posada's dracula is a species of orchid.
