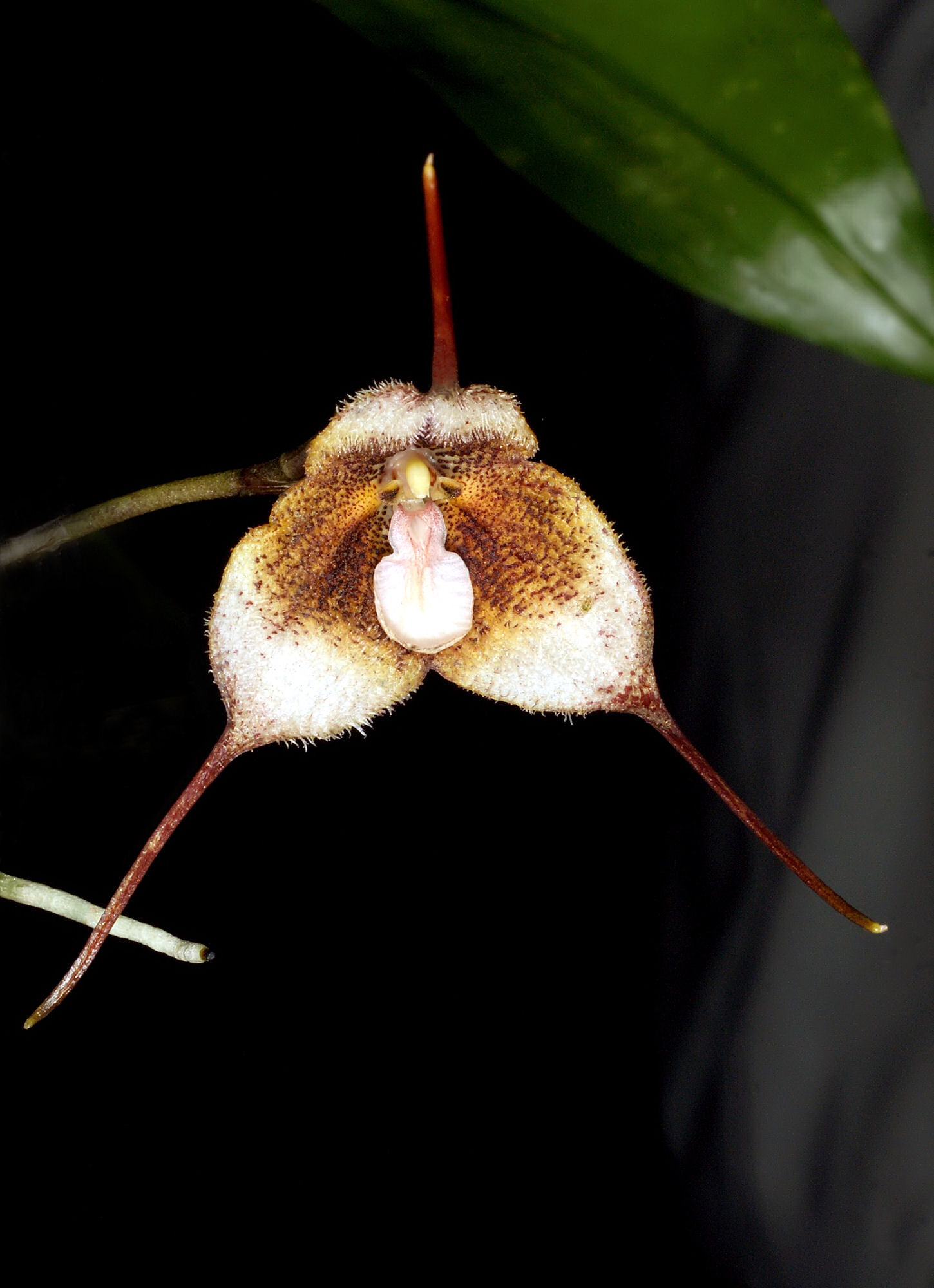
- Close-up of flower
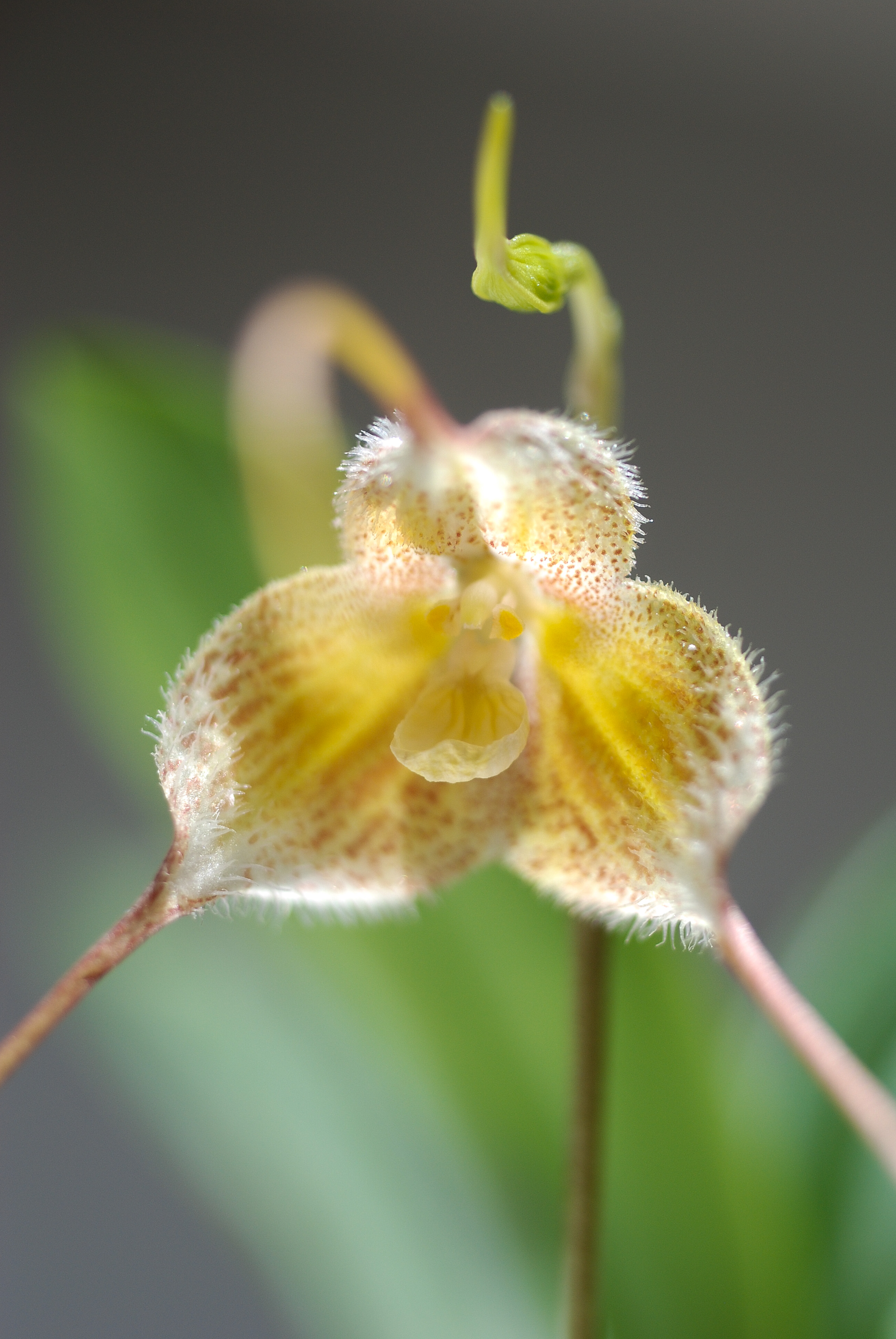
- A yellow morph

Conservation status
- Endangered (IUCN 3.1)

Scientific classification
- Kingdom: Plantae
- Clade: Embryophytes
- Clade: Tracheophytes
- Clade: Spermatophytes
- Clade: Angiosperms
- Clade: Monocots
- Order: Asparagales
- Family: Orchidaceae
- Subfamily: Epidendroideae
- Genus: Dracula
- Species: D. diana

Binomial name
- Dracula diana Luer & R.Escobar

= Dracula diana =

Species of plant

Dracula diana is a species of flowering plant in the family Orchidaceae. It is native to western Colombia. An epiphyte, it is found in cloud forests in only four locations at elevations from 1,400 to 1,800 m (4,600 to 5,900 ft). It has been assessed as Endangered due to collection of individuals in the wild for the orchid fancier trade.
