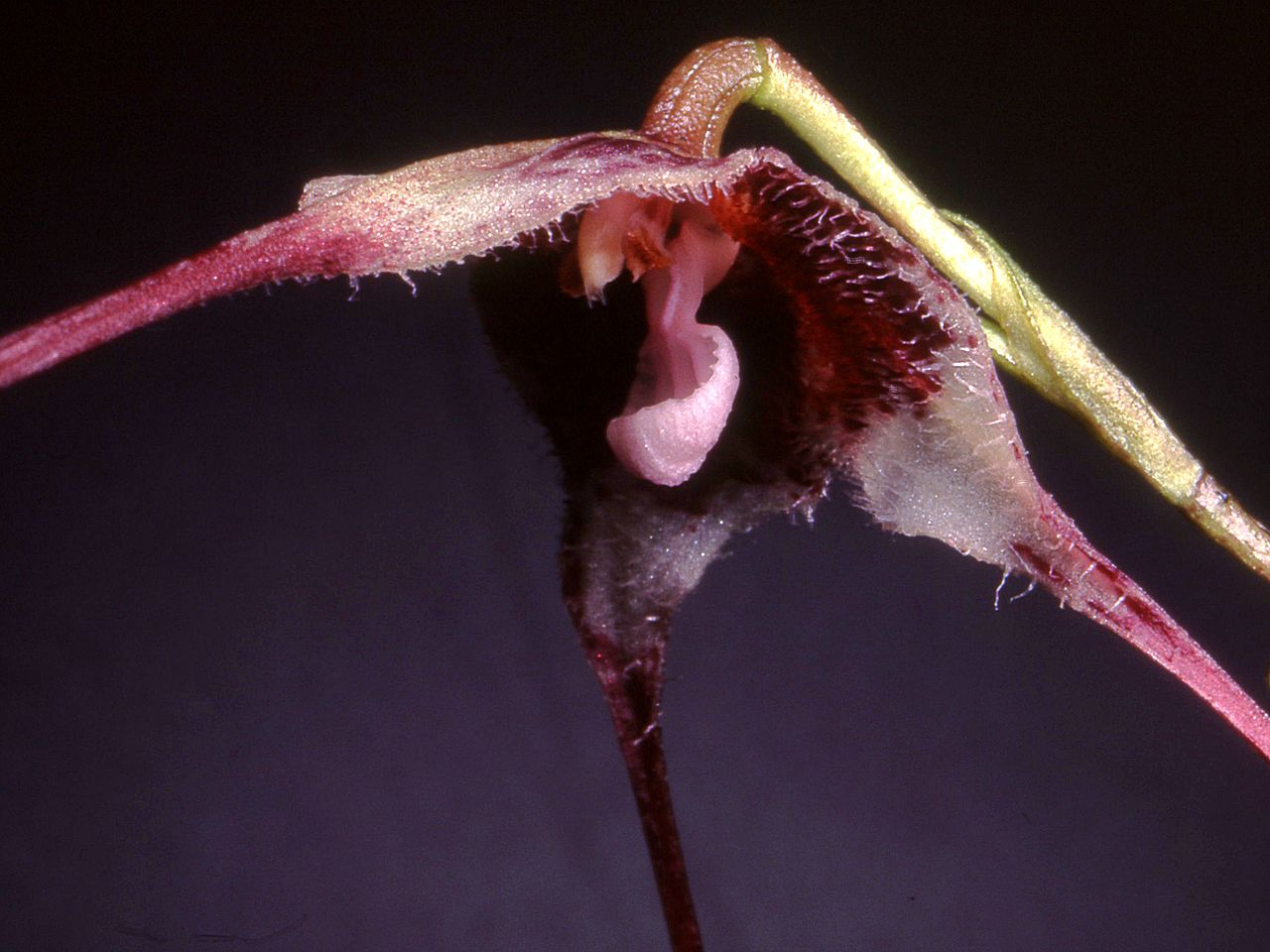

Scientific classification
- Kingdom: Plantae
- Clade: Tracheophytes
- Clade: Angiosperms
- Clade: Monocots
- Order: Asparagales
- Family: Orchidaceae
- Subfamily: Epidendroideae
- Genus: Dracula
- Species: D. ripleyana

Binomial name
- Dracula ripleyana Luer

= Dracula ripleyana =

Species of orchid

Dracula ripleyana is a species of orchid. It can be found in Costa Rica.
