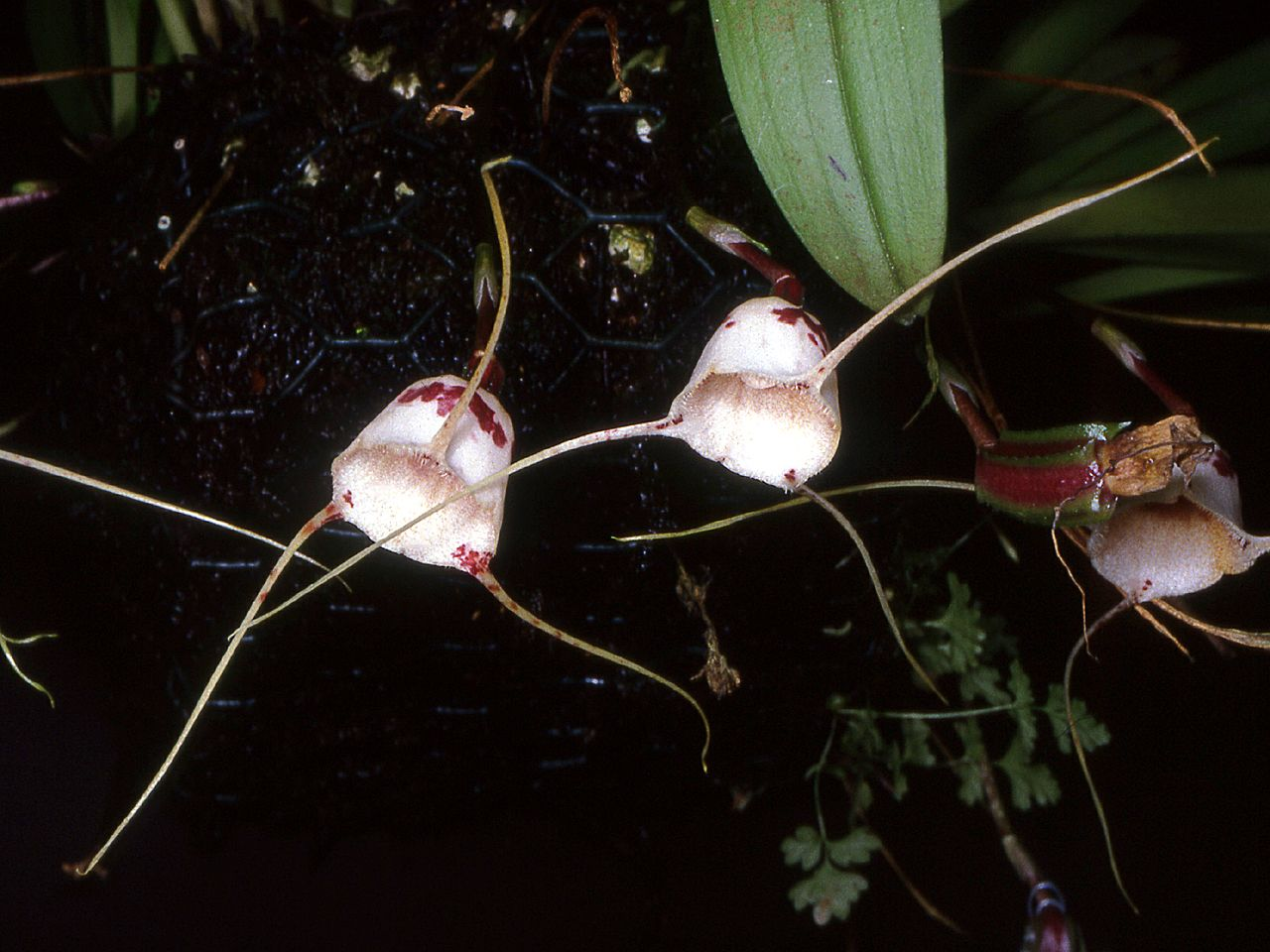

Scientific classification
- Kingdom: Plantae
- Clade: Embryophytes
- Clade: Tracheophytes
- Clade: Angiosperms
- Clade: Monocots
- Order: Asparagales
- Family: Orchidaceae
- Subfamily: Epidendroideae
- Genus: Dracula
- Species: D. inaequalis

Binomial name
- Dracula inaequalis (Rchb.f.) Luer & R. Escobar

Synonyms
- Masdevallia inaequalis Rchb.f. (Basionym); Masdevallia carderi Rchb.f.; Dracula carderi (Rchb.f.) Luer

= Dracula inaequalis =

Species of orchid

Dracula inaequalis is a species of orchid.
