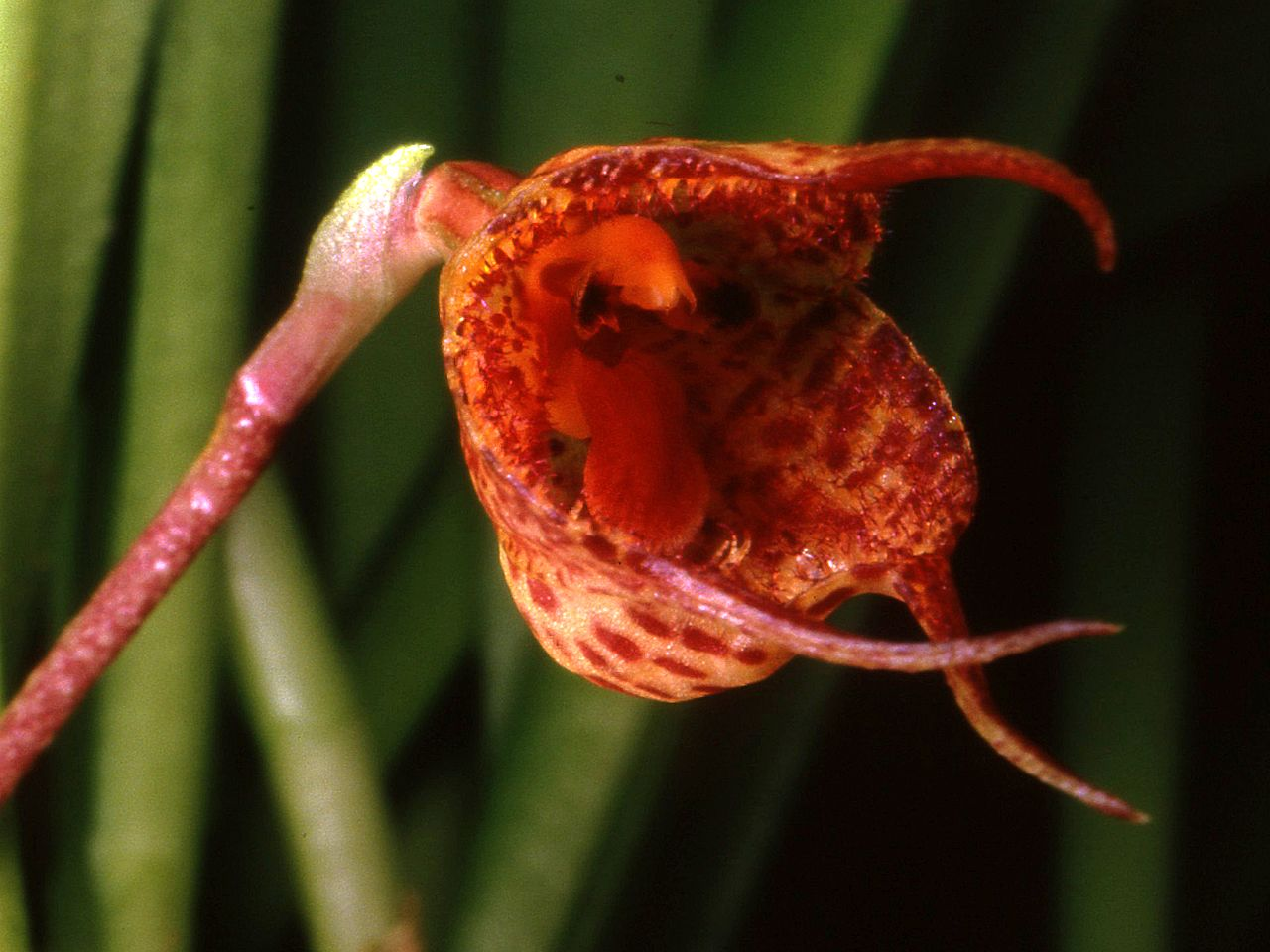

Scientific classification
- Kingdom: Plantae
- Clade: Embryophytes
- Clade: Tracheophytes
- Clade: Angiosperms
- Clade: Monocots
- Order: Asparagales
- Family: Orchidaceae
- Subfamily: Epidendroideae
- Genus: Dracula
- Species: D. pusilla

Binomial name
- Dracula pusilla (Rolfe) Luer

Synonyms
- Masdevallia pusilla Rolfe (Basionym); Masdevallia johannis Schltr.; Dracula vagabunda Luer & R. Escobar

= Dracula pusilla =

Species of orchid

Dracula pusilla is a species of orchid.
