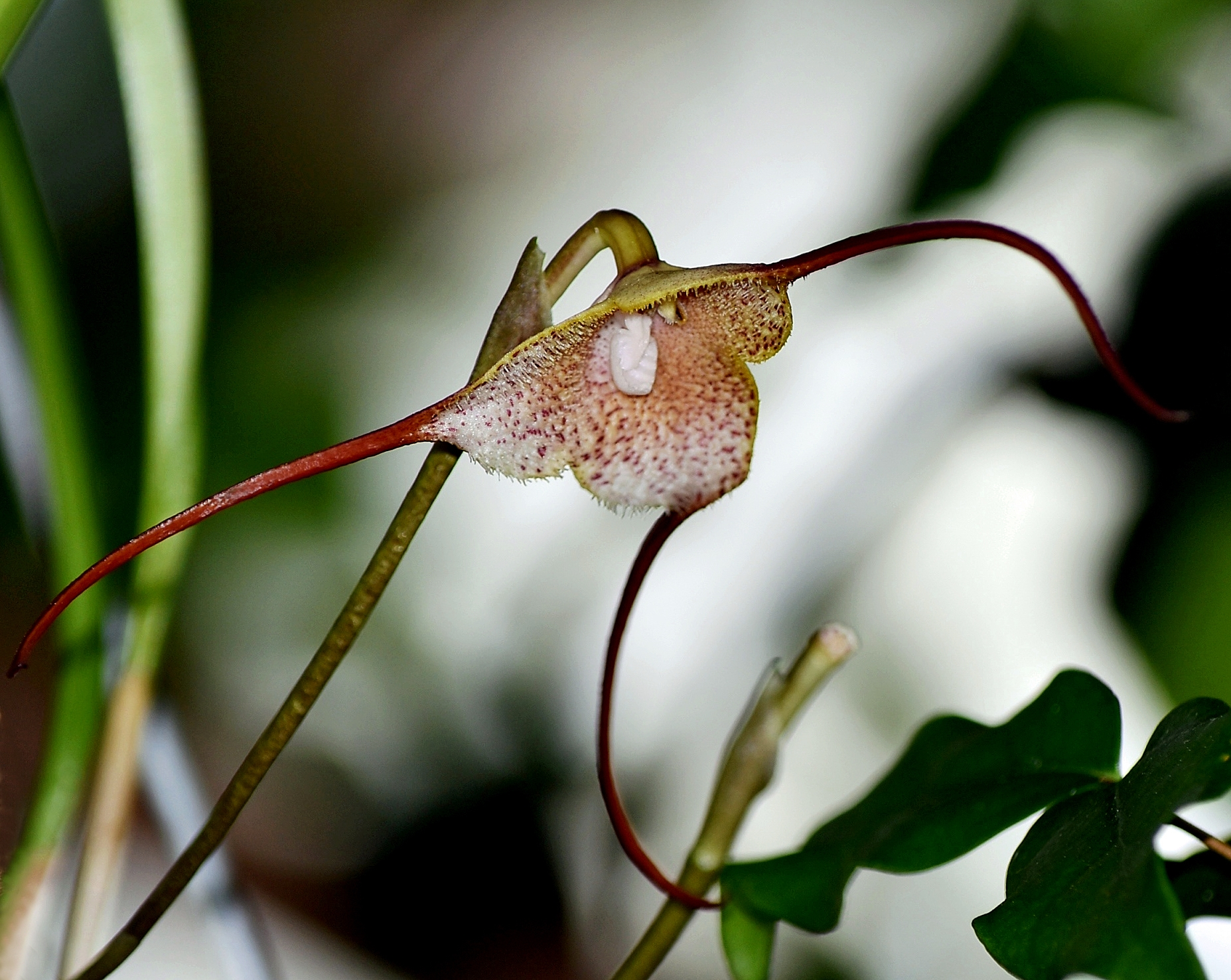

Scientific classification
- Kingdom: Plantae
- Clade: Embryophytes
- Clade: Tracheophytes
- Clade: Angiosperms
- Clade: Monocots
- Order: Asparagales
- Family: Orchidaceae
- Subfamily: Epidendroideae
- Genus: Dracula
- Species: D. houtteana

Binomial name
- Dracula houtteana (Rchb.f.) Luer

Synonyms
- Masdevallia houtteana Rchb.f. (Basionym); Masdevallia callifera Schltr.; Masdevallia carderiopsis F. Lehm. & Kraenzl.; Masdevallia mosquerae (Kraenzl.) F. Lehm. & Kraenzl.; Masdevallia carderi var. mosquerae Kraenzl.; Dracula callifera (Schltr.) Luer; Dracula carderiopsis (F. Lehm. & Kraenzl.) Luer; Dracula mosquerae (F. Lehm. & Kraenzl.) Luer

= Dracula houtteana =

Species of orchid

Dracula houtteana is a species of orchid.
