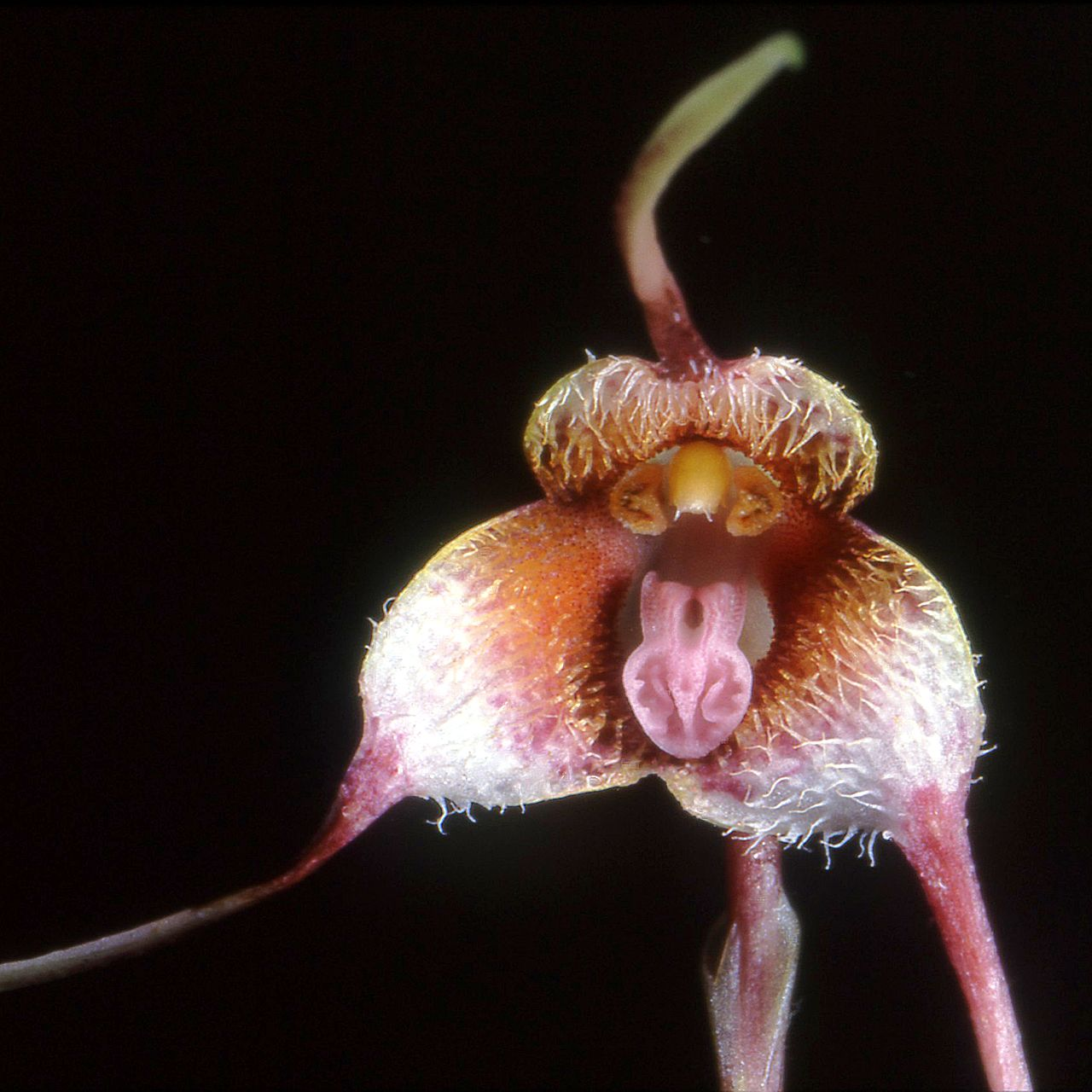

Scientific classification
- Kingdom: Plantae
- Clade: Embryophytes
- Clade: Tracheophytes
- Clade: Angiosperms
- Clade: Monocots
- Order: Asparagales
- Family: Orchidaceae
- Subfamily: Epidendroideae
- Genus: Dracula
- Species: D. lotax

Binomial name
- Dracula lotax (Luer) Luer

Synonyms
- Masdevallia lotax Luer (Basionym)

= Dracula lotax =

Species of orchid

Dracula lotax is a species of orchid found in Ecuador and Colombia. Dracula Lotax is known as the monkey orchid. A small species with long, ovate leaves. Flower spikes of this species shoot to the side or up instead of going down.
