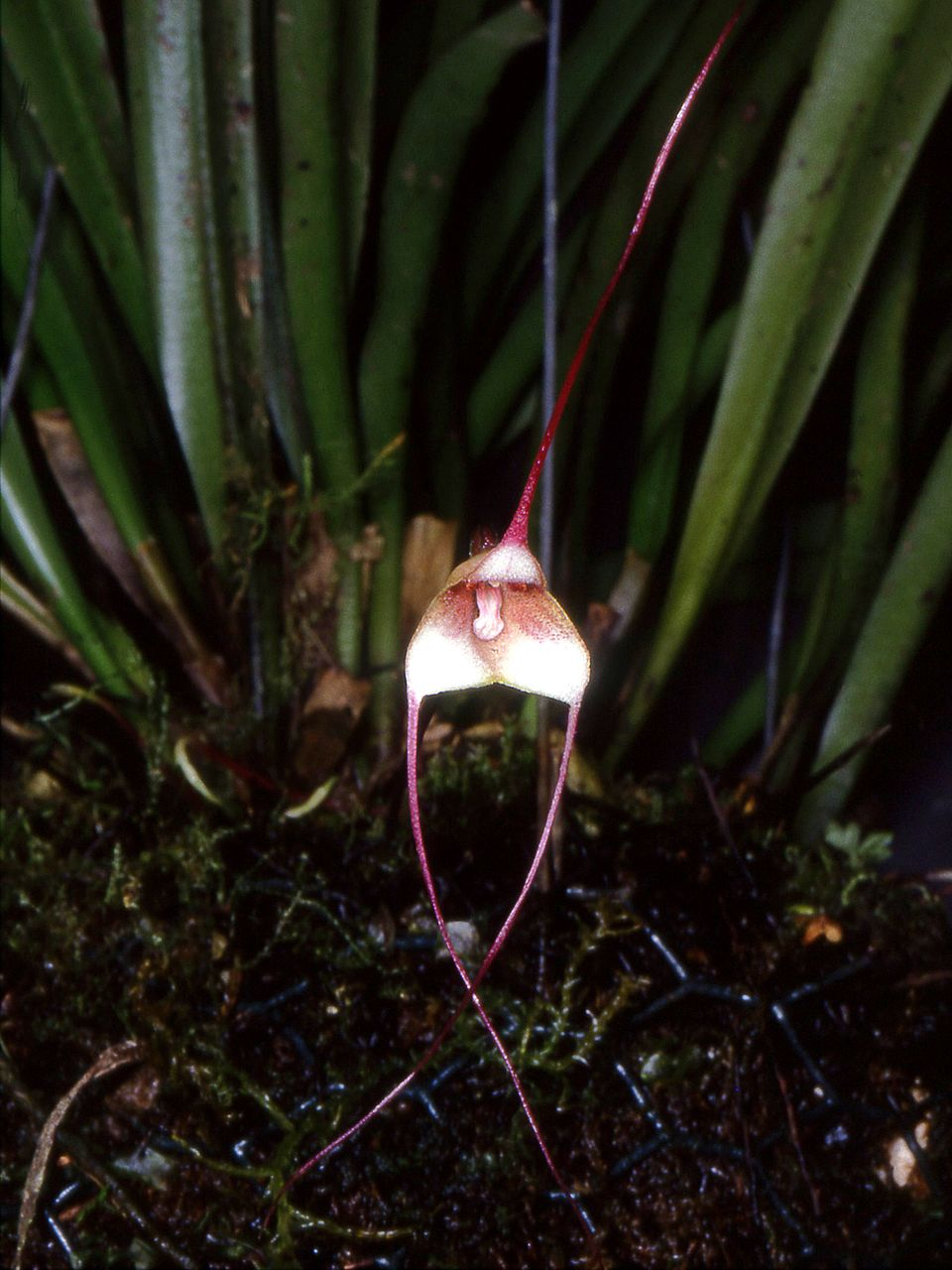

Scientific classification
- Kingdom: Plantae
- Clade: Embryophytes
- Clade: Tracheophytes
- Clade: Angiosperms
- Clade: Monocots
- Order: Asparagales
- Family: Orchidaceae
- Subfamily: Epidendroideae
- Genus: Dracula
- Species: D. felix

Binomial name
- Dracula felix (Luer) Luer

Synonyms
- Masdevallia felix Luer (Basionym)

= Dracula felix =

Species of orchid

Dracula felix is a species of orchid.
