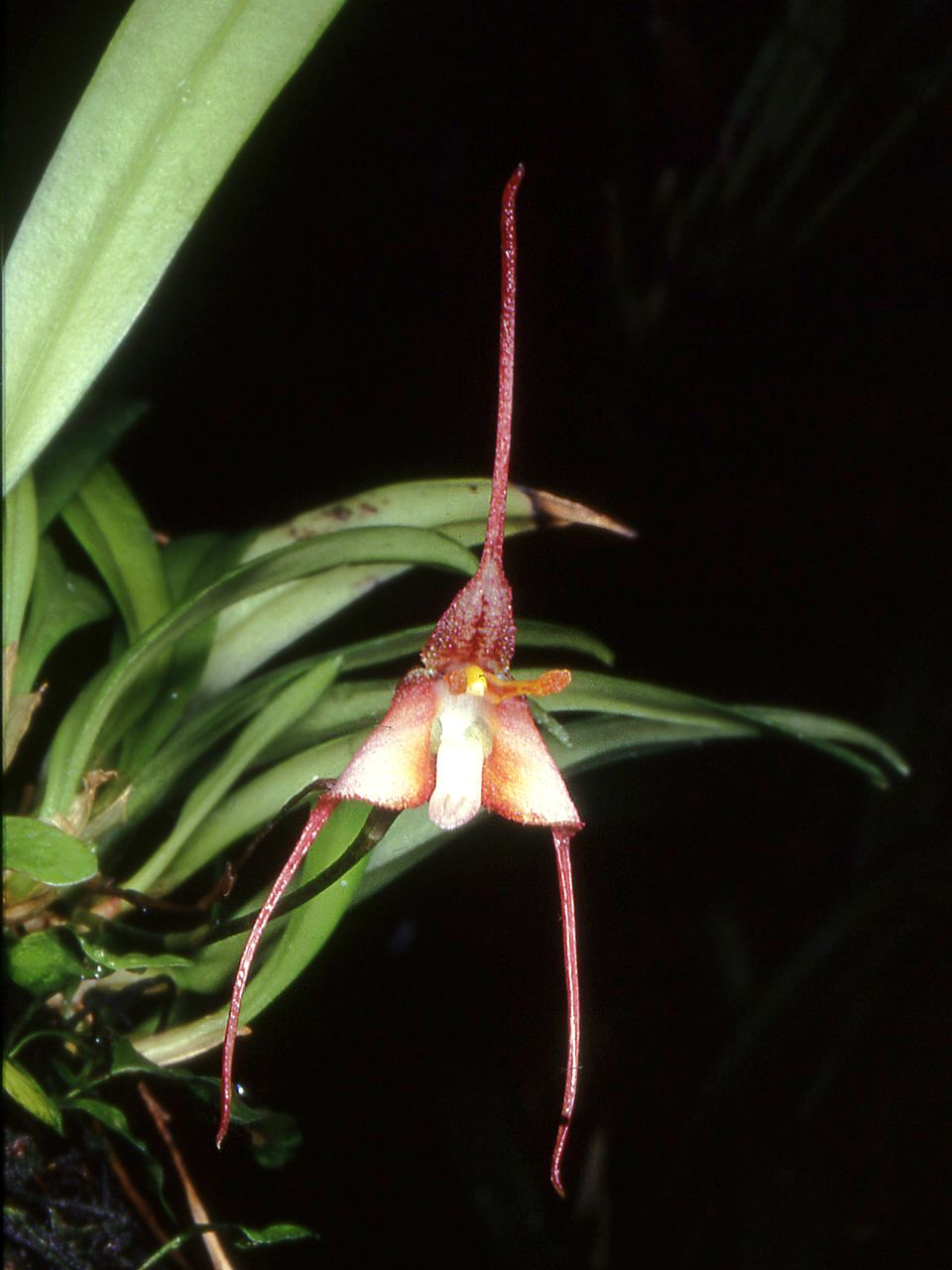

Scientific classification
- Kingdom: Plantae
- Clade: Tracheophytes
- Clade: Angiosperms
- Clade: Monocots
- Order: Asparagales
- Family: Orchidaceae
- Subfamily: Epidendroideae
- Genus: Dracula
- Species: D. cochliops

Binomial name
- Dracula cochliops Luer & R. Escobar

= Dracula cochliops =

Species of orchid

Dracula cochliops is a species of orchid found in Colombia.
