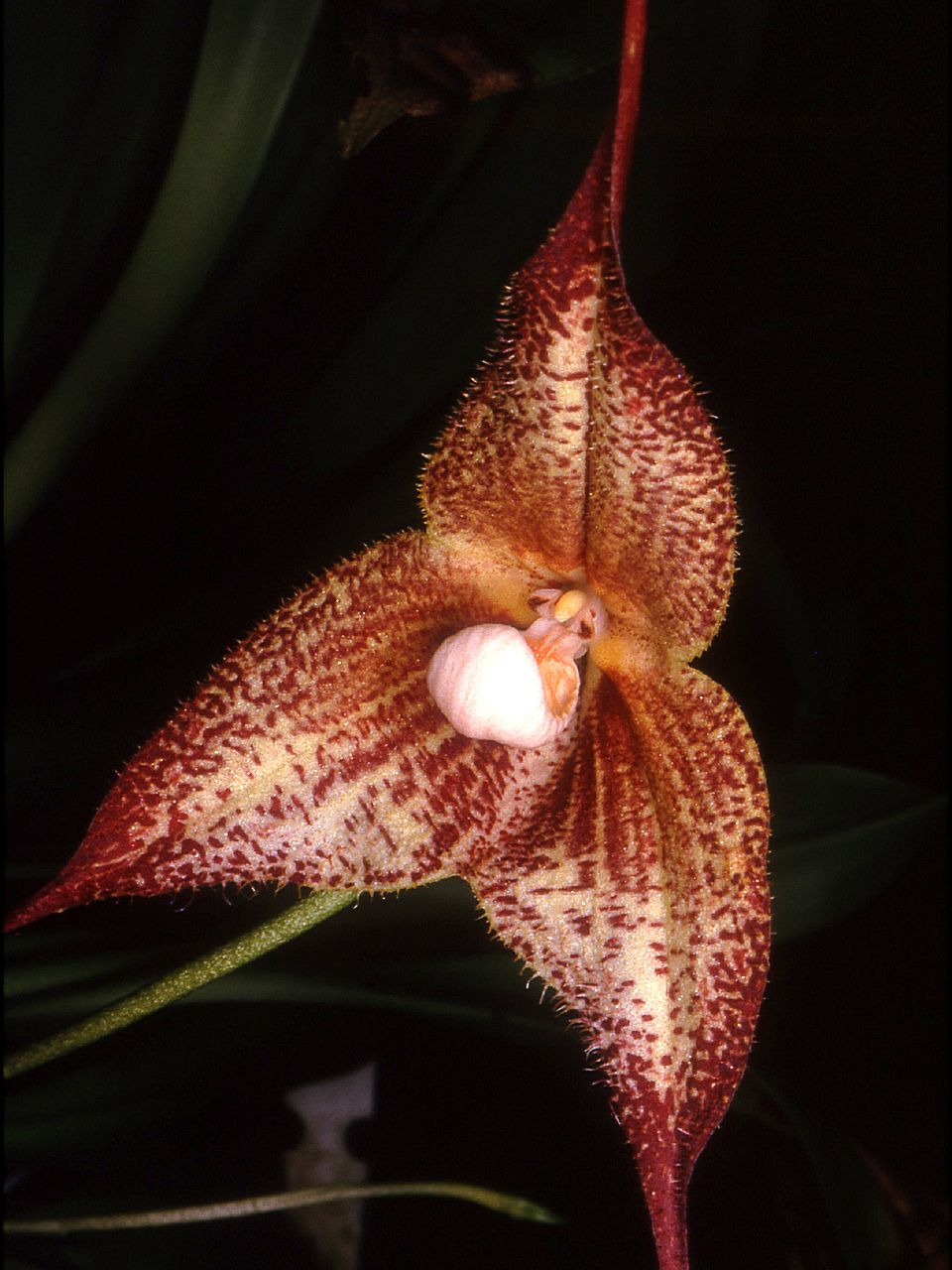

Scientific classification
- Kingdom: Plantae
- Clade: Embryophytes
- Clade: Tracheophytes
- Clade: Angiosperms
- Clade: Monocots
- Order: Asparagales
- Family: Orchidaceae
- Subfamily: Epidendroideae
- Genus: Dracula
- Species: D. chimaera

Binomial name
- Dracula chimaera (Rchb.f.) Luer

Synonyms
- Masdevallia chimaera Rchb.f. (Basionym); Masdevallia backhousiana Rchb.f.; Masdevallia senilis Rchb.f.; Masdevallia wallisii var. stupenda Rchb.f.; Masdevallia chimaera var. backhousiana (Rchb.f.) H.J. Veitch; Masdevallia chimaera var. senilis (Rchb.f.) H.J. Veitch; Dracula senilis (Rchb.f.) Luer

= Dracula chimaera =

Species of orchid

Dracula chimaera is the type species of the orchid genus Dracula.
