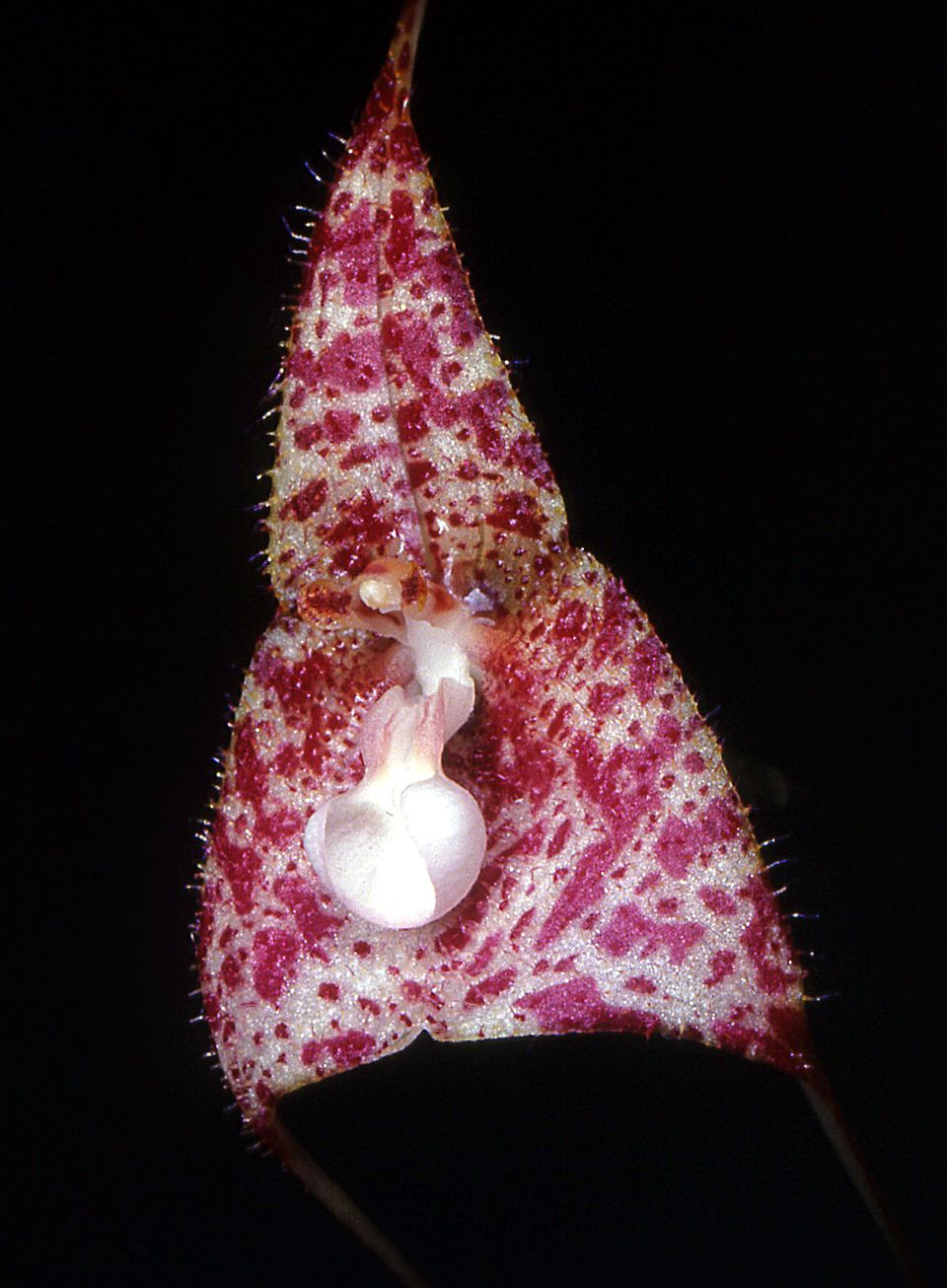

Scientific classification
- Kingdom: Plantae
- Clade: Embryophytes
- Clade: Tracheophytes
- Clade: Angiosperms
- Clade: Monocots
- Order: Asparagales
- Family: Orchidaceae
- Subfamily: Epidendroideae
- Genus: Dracula
- Species: D. vespertilio

Binomial name
- Dracula vespertilio (Rchb.f.) Luer

Synonyms
- Masdevallia vespertilio Rchb.f. (Basionym)

= Dracula vespertilio =

Species of orchid

Dracula vespertilio is a species of orchid.
