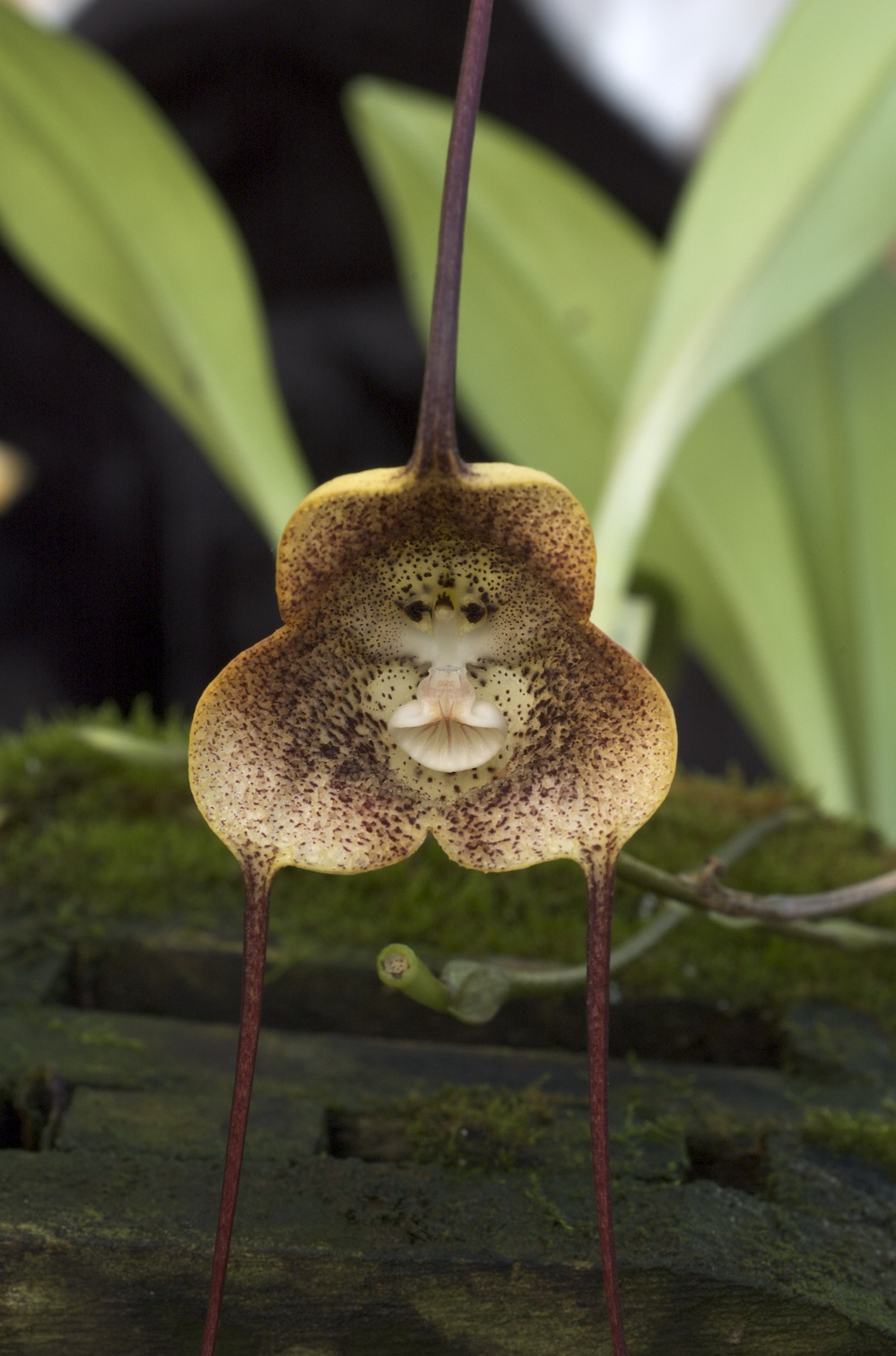

Scientific classification
- Kingdom: Plantae
- Clade: Embryophytes
- Clade: Tracheophytes
- Clade: Angiosperms
- Clade: Monocots
- Order: Asparagales
- Family: Orchidaceae
- Subfamily: Epidendroideae
- Genus: Dracula
- Species: D. radiosa

Binomial name
- Dracula radiosa (Rchb.f.) Luer

Synonyms
- Masdevallia radiosa Rchb.f. (Basionym); Masdevallia medellinensis Kraenzl.; Dracula medellinensis (Kraenzl.) Luer

= Dracula radiosa =

Species of orchid

Dracula radiosa is a species of orchid endemic to Colombia.
