= Dracula nosferatu =

Scientific classification
- Kingdom: Plantae
- Clade: Tracheophytes
- Clade: Angiosperms
- Clade: Monocots
- Order: Asparagales
- Family: Orchidaceae
- Subfamily: Epidendroideae
- Genus: Dracula
- Species: D. nosferatu

Binomial name
- Dracula nosferatu Luer & R.Escobar

Species of plant

Dracula nosferatu is a species of orchid in the subtribe Pleurothallidinae (family Orchidaceae), native to Antioquia Department, Colombia. An epiphyte found only in a few locales in a degraded cloud forest, it is nonetheless cultivated by Dracula enthusiasts, by cloning.
