= Monkey orchid =

Monkey orchid is a common name for several plants and may refer to:

- Calanthe tricarinata, native to southeast and east Asia
- Dracula gigas, native to South America
- Dracula simia, native to South America
- Orchis simia, native to Europe and western Asia
