= Gardens by the Bay =

Nature park in Singapore

- Taman di Persisiran (Malay) 滨海湾花园 (Chinese) வளைகுடா தோட்டம் (Tamil)
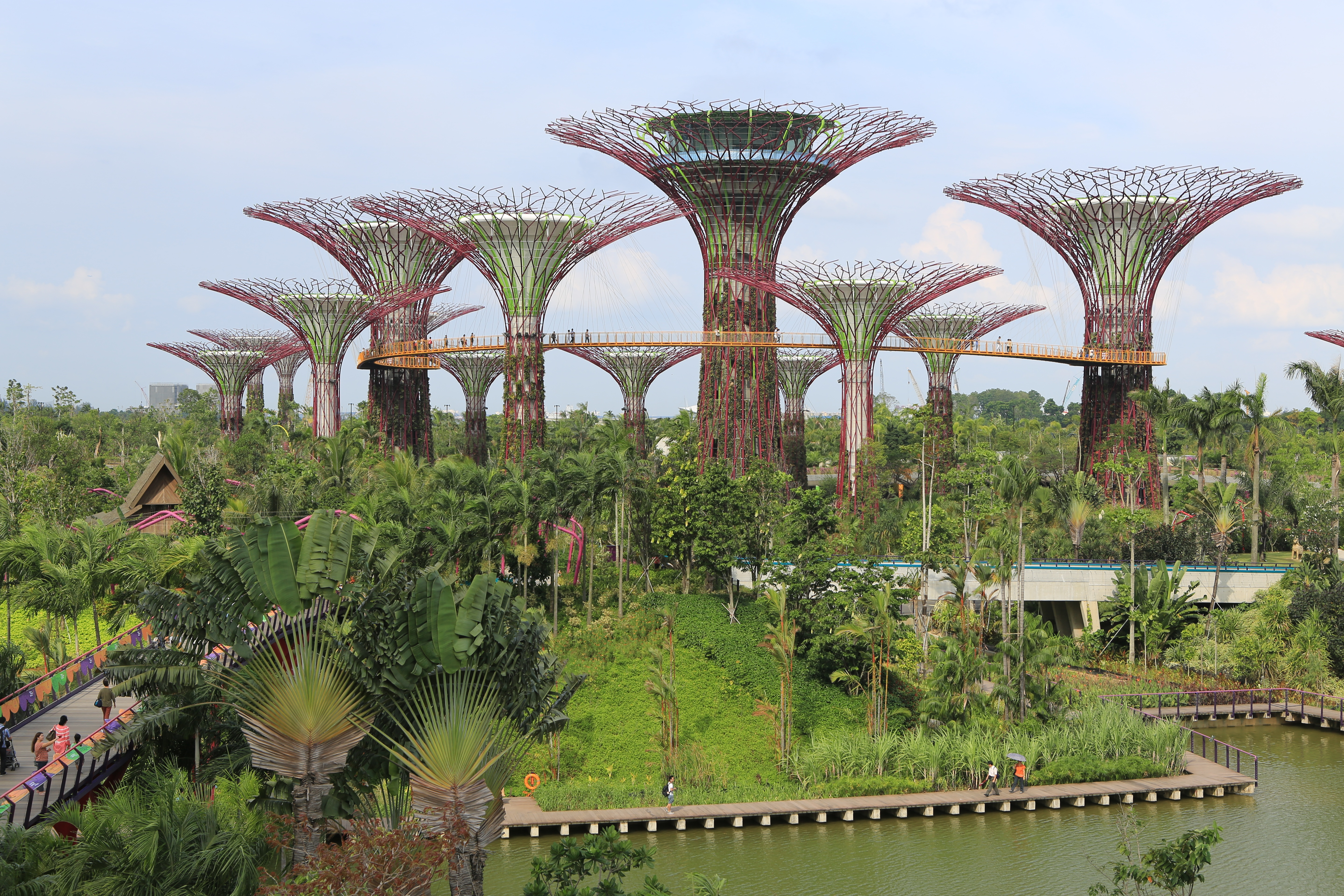
- Gardens By The Bay Supertree view
- Interactive map of Gardens by the Bay
- Type: Urban park
- Location: Downtown Core, Kallang, Marina East, Marina South, Singapore
- Coordinates: 1°17′5″N 103°51′54″E
- Area: 105 hectares (260 acres)
- Opened: 29 June 2012; 14 years ago
- Operator: Gardens by the Bay (previously National Parks Board)
- Visitors: 50 million (as of October 2018)
- Open: Daily
- Public transit: TE22 Gardens by the Bay; CC34 DT16 Bayfront; TE22A Founders' Memorial (Bay East Garden / Founders' Memorial, from 2027)
- Website: www.gardensbythebay.com.sg

The Gardens by the Bay (GBTB) is an urban park spanning 105 hectares (260 acres) in the Central Region of Singapore, adjacent to the Marina Reservoir. The park consists of three waterfront gardens: Bay South Garden in Marina South, Bay East Garden with the Founders' Memorial in Marina East, and Bay Central Garden in the Downtown Core and Kallang. The largest of the gardens at 54 hectares (130 acres) is the Bay South Garden, designed by Grant Associates. Its Flower Dome is the largest glass greenhouse in the world.

Gardens by the Bay was part of the nation's plans to transform its "Garden City" to a "City in a Garden", with the aim of raising the quality of life by enhancing greenery and flora in the city. First announced by Prime Minister Lee Hsien Loong at Singapore's National Day Rally in 2005, Gardens by the Bay was intended to be Singapore's premier urban outdoor recreation space and one of the country's national icons.

A popular tourist attraction in Singapore, the park had 6.4 million visitors in 2014, and had had 20 million by November 2015 and over 50 million by 2018. In 2024, TripAdvisor's Traveler's Choice Awards Best of the Best ranked it the eighth-best attraction in the world and the best in Asia.

== Bay Central Garden ==
Bay Central Garden acts as a link between Bay South and Bay East Gardens. It stands at 15 hectares (37 acres) with a 3-kilometre (1.9 mi) waterfront promenade that allows for scenic walks stretching from the city centre to the east of Singapore.

== Bay East Garden ==
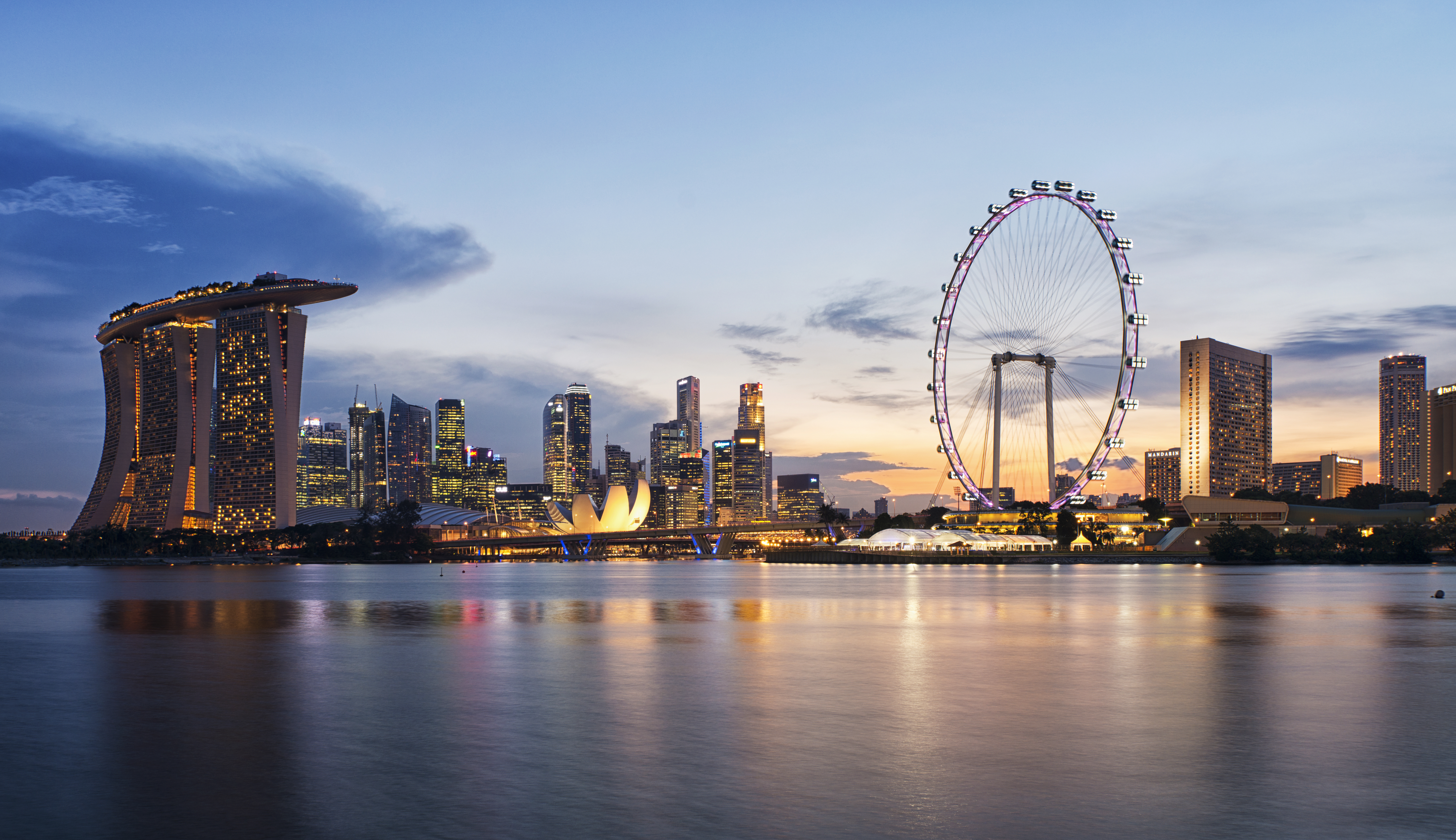
The Singapore skyline viewed from Bay East Garden

Bay East Garden is 32 hectares (79 acres) in size and has a 2-kilometre (1.2 mi) promenade frontage bordering the Marina Reservoir. An interim park was developed at Bay East Garden in support of the 2010 Summer Youth Olympics. The first phase of the garden was opened to the public in October 2011, allowing alternative access to the Marina Barrage.

It is designed as a series of large tropical leaf-shaped gardens, each with its own specific landscaping design, character and theme. There will be five water inlets aligned with the prevailing wind direction, maximizing and extending the shoreline while allowing wind and water to penetrate the site to help cool areas of activity around them. Bay East Garden provides visitors with an unobstructed view of the city skyline.

In 2018, Bay East Garden was designated as the future site of the Founders' Memorial, which will open at the end of 2028. Bay East Garden was closed in 2023 to facilitate a major redevelopment of the area, which will open in tandem with the Founders' Memorial.

== Bay South Garden ==
Bay South Garden opened to the public on 29 June 2012. It is the largest of the three gardens at 54 hectares (130 acres) and designed to show the best of tropical horticulture and garden artistry.

The overall concept of its master plan by Grant Associates draws inspiration from an orchid as it is representative of the tropics and of Singapore, being the country's national flower, the Vanda 'Miss Joaquim'. The orchid takes root at the waterfront (conservatories), while the leaves (landforms), shoots (paths, roads and linkways) and secondary roots (water, energy and communication lines) then form an integrated network with blooms (theme gardens and Supertrees) at key intersections.

=== Conservatories ===
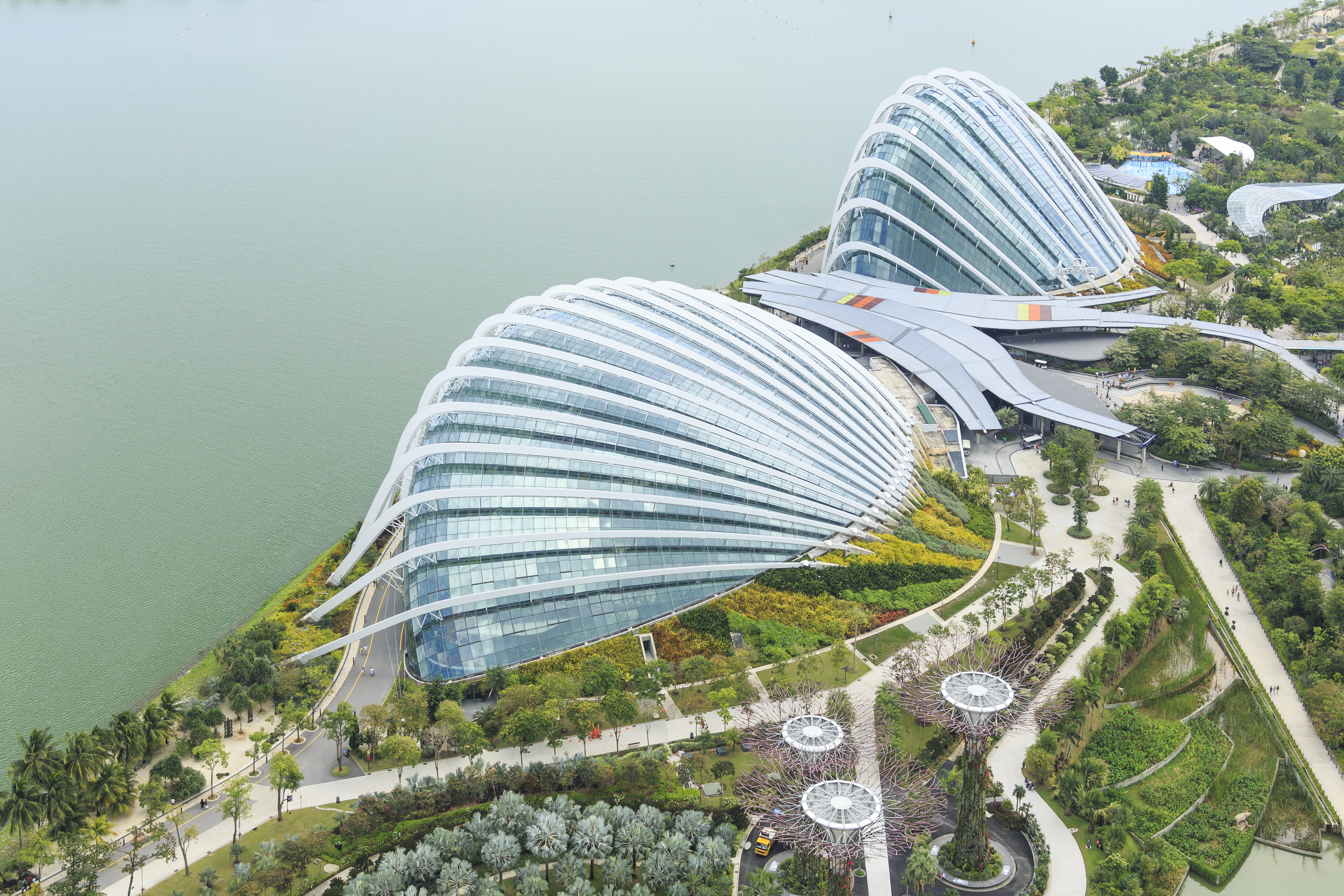
Gardens by the Bay conservatories Flower Dome (center) and Cloud Forest (upper right), with three Supertrees visible at bottom right.

The conservatory complex at Gardens by the Bay comprises two cooled conservatories – the Flower Dome and the Cloud Forest, situated along the edge of Marina Reservoir. The conservatories, designed by WilkinsonEyre and led by Andrew Grant of Grant Associates, are intended to be an energy-efficient showcase of sustainable building technologies and to provide an all-weather edutainment space within the Gardens. Both are very large (around 1 hectare (2.5 acres)), and the Flower Dome is the world's largest columnless glasshouse.

The construction of glasshouses is special: having such a large glass roof without additional interior support (such as columns) and aiming to minimize the environmental footprint. Rainwater is collected from the surface and circulated in the cooling system connected to the Supertrees. The Supertrees are used to vent hot air and cool circulated water.

=== Flower Dome ===
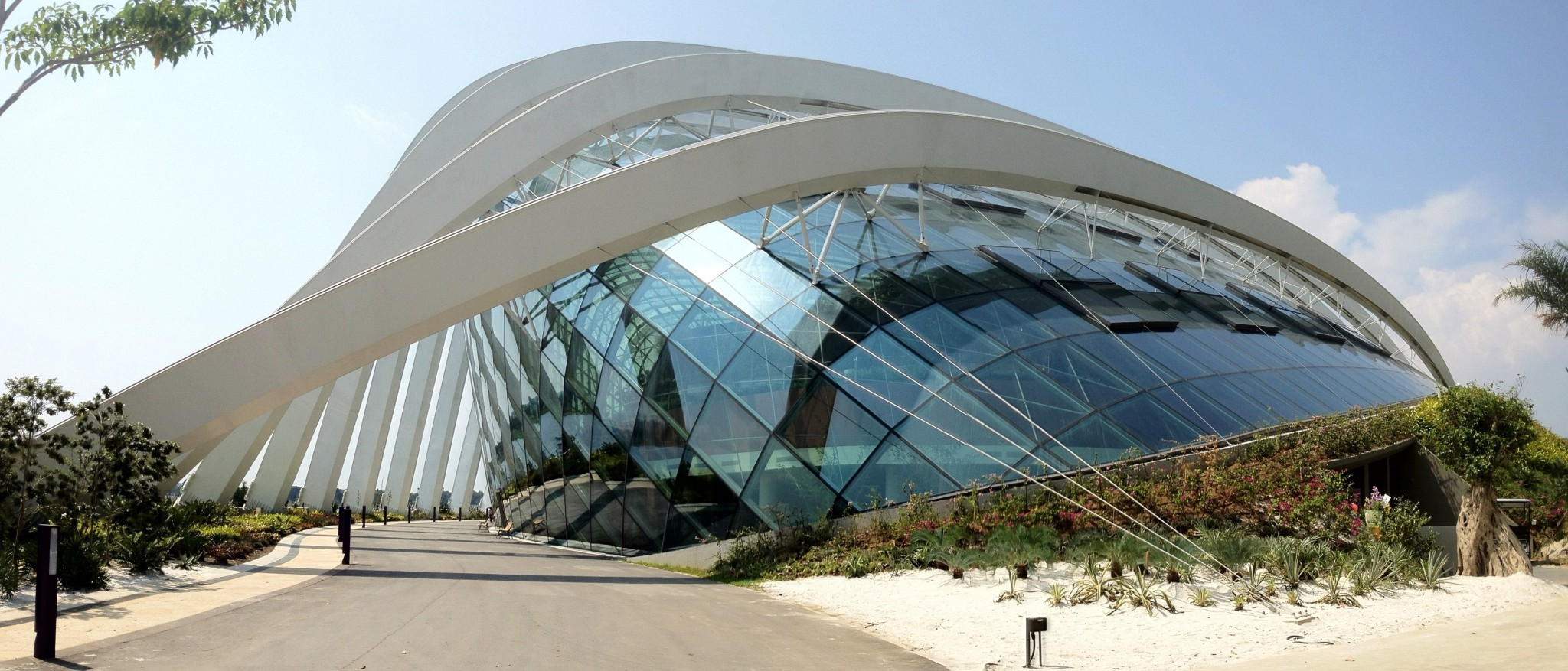
The Flower Dome

The Flower Dome was the largest greenhouse in the world as listed in the 2015 Guinness Book of World Records at 1.2 hectares (3.0 acres) and replicates a cool-dry mediterranean climate. It features a changing display area, the flower field, and eight other themed gardens, namely The Baobabs, Succulent Garden, Australian Garden, South African Garden, South American Garden, Olive Grove, California Garden and the Mediterranean Garden. These eight gardens exhibit exotic flowers and plants from the Mediterranean and semi-arid regions from five continents.

Here is the list of some plants growing in the Flower Dome:

- Adansonia digitata
- Adansonia grandidieri
- Adansonia madagascariensis
- Adenanthos sericeus
- Agave guiengola
- Agave victoriae-reginae
- Aloidendron barberae
- Anigozanthos species and cultivars
- Araucaria araucana
- Bombax ceiba bonsai
- Brachychiton rupestris
- Bulbine namaensis
- Camellia japonica
- Carnegiea gigantea
- Ceiba chodatii
- Cleistocactus winteri
- Cyphostemma juttae
- Dendrobium speciosum var. speciosum
- Dorstenia gigas
- Dracaena draco
- Echinocactus grusonii
- Faucaria tigrina
- Ferocactus pottsii
- Fouquieria columnaris
- Geranium maderense
- Grevillea hybrids
- Jubaea chilensis
- Olea europaea
- Phoenix canariensis
- Phoenix dactylifera
- Protea cynaroides
- Xanthorrhoea glauca

The flower displays, located predominantly in the flower field, are six to eight horticulturally-themed shows held annually. Each flower display reflects different seasons and festivals, focused on one type or a collection of plants and flowers such as dahlias, cherry blossoms, tulips, roses, and poinsettias.

The Flower Dome also features several sculptures, such as a collection of 40 different driftwood animals by James Doran-Webb, Bruno Catalano's La Famille De Voyageurs, and Yayoi Kusama's Kei-Chan.

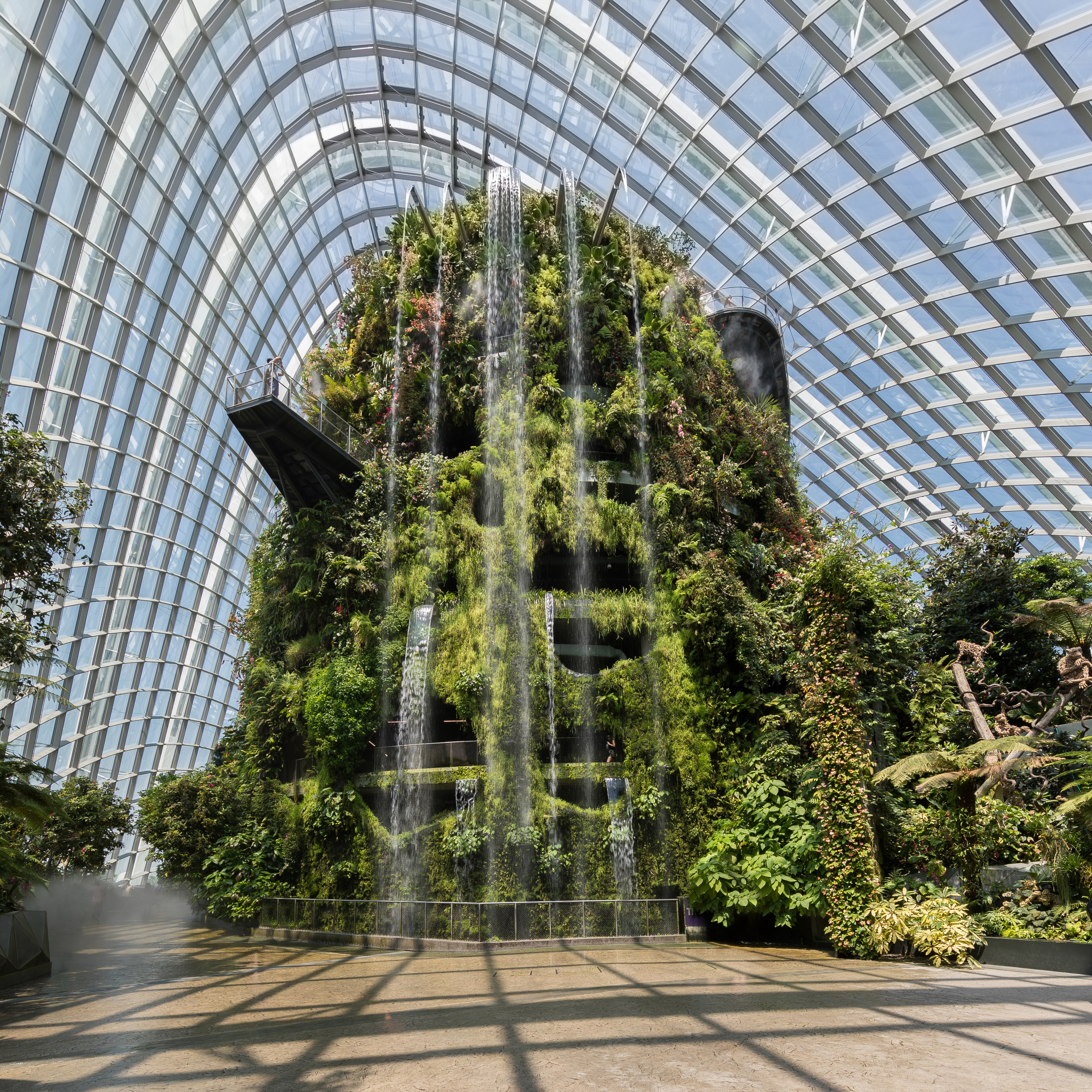
The Cloud Fountain, the world's second tallest indoor waterfall

=== Cloud Forest ===
The Cloud Forest is higher but slightly smaller at 0.8 hectares (2.0 acres). It replicates the cool moist conditions found in tropical mountain regions between 1,000 metres (3,300 ft) and 3,000 metres (9,800 ft) above sea level, found in South-East Asia and in Central and South America. It features a 42-metre (138 ft) "Cloud Mountain". After ascending to the top by an elevator, visitors descend the mountain via a circular path which crosses underneath the 35-metre (115 ft) waterfall multiple times.

The "Cloud Mountain" itself is an intricate structure entirely clad in epiphytes such as orchids, ferns, spikemosses and clubmosses, bromeliads and anthuriums. The Maiden Hair Fungus inspired the design by Grant Associates and consists of many levels, each with a different theme, including The Lost World, The Cavern, The Waterfall View, The Crystal Mountain, The Cloud Forest Gallery, The Cloud Forest Theatre and The Secret Garden.

The following is a partial list of plants growing in the Cloud Forest:

- Adiantum pedatum ('Maidenhair Fern')
- Aechmea sp.
- Anguloa clowesii
- Anthurium andraeanum ('Flamingo Flower')
- Anthurium scherzerianum ('Pigtail' Anthurium)
- Anthurium veitchii ('King Anthurium')
- Anthurium warocqueanum ('Queen Anthurium')
- Arundina graminifolia
- Begonia luxurians
- Brugmansia suaveolens
- Caryota zebrina
- Chambeyronia macrocarpa
- Cochliostema odoratissimum
- Dendrobium victoriae-reginae
- Deppea splendens
- Dicksonia antarctica
- Dischidia nummularia
- Dischidia ruscifolia ('million-hearts')
- Doryanthes palmeri
- Dracula gigas
- Encephalartos kisambo
- Episcia sp.
- Howea forsteriana
- Hoya linearis
- Ludisia discolor
- Magnolia grandiflora
- Masdevallia ayabacana
- Medinilla magnifica
- Neoregelia sp.
- Nepenthes sp.
- Odontoglossum cirrhosum
- Paphiopedilum maudiae
- Paphiopedilum rothschildianum
- Pellionia repens
- Peperomia fraseri
- Peperomia verticillata
- Phalaenopsis schilleriana
- Pilea glauca
- Pinguicula sp. (butterworts)
- Sarracenia sp. (N. American pitcher plants)
- Sequoia sempervirens
- Strongylodon macrobotrys ('Jade Vine')
- Thunbergia mysorensis
- Tillandsia usneoides ('Spanish Moss')
- Wollemia nobilis
- Worsleya procera

In April 2022, a Māori kūwaha (meeting house) sculpture was presented to Singapore by Prime Minister Jacinda Ardern, of New Zealand, during her first official trip abroad since the 2020 pandemic. Symbolising strong ties and a friendship between New Zealand and Singapore, it is the work of master carvers from the New Zealand Māori Arts and Crafts Institute.

Other sculptures in the Cloud Forest include Dale Chihuly's Ethereal White Persians, Marc Quinn's The Rush of Nature, Paul Baliker's A Matter of Time, and a series of four botanical "hybrid" sculptures by Makoto Azuma.

=== Supertree Grove ===
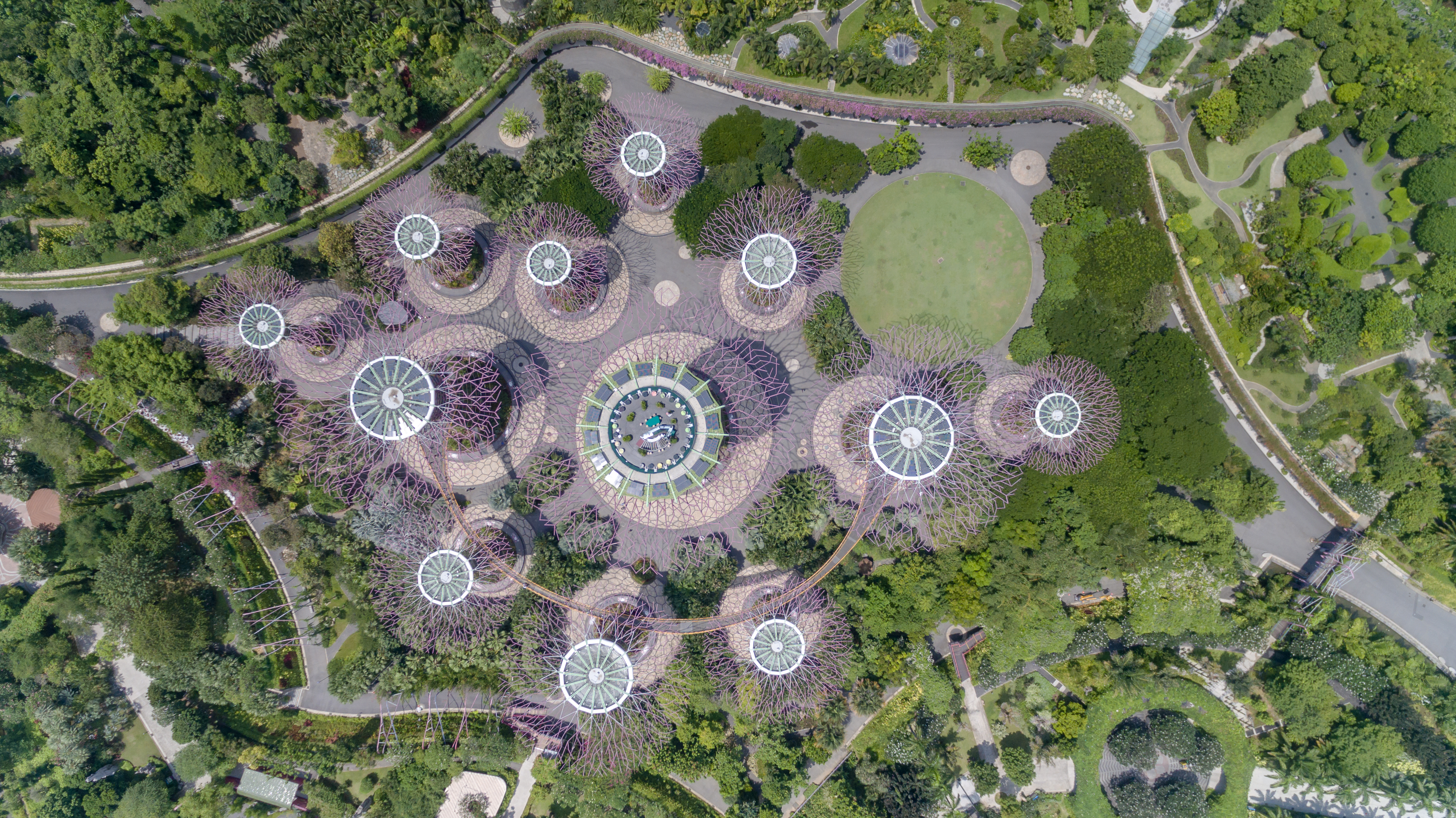
Supertree Grove, Singapore

Supertrees are the 18 tree-like structures that dominate the Gardens' landscape, with heights that range between 25 metres (82 ft) and 50 metres (160 ft). Grant Associates conceived and designed them with the imaginative engineering of Atelier One and Atelier Ten. They are vertical gardens that perform a multitude of functions, which include planting, shading and working as environmental engines for the gardens.

The Supertrees are home to enclaves of unique and exotic ferns, vines, orchids and also a vast collection of bromeliads such as Neoregelia and Tillandsia, amongst other plants. They are fitted with environmental technologies that mimic the ecological function of trees: photovoltaic cells that harness solar energy which can be used for some of the functions of the Supertrees (such as lighting), similar to how trees photosynthesize, and collection of rainwater for use in irrigation and fountain displays, similar to how trees absorb rainwater for growth. The Supertrees also serve air intake and exhaust functions as part of the conservatories' cooling systems.

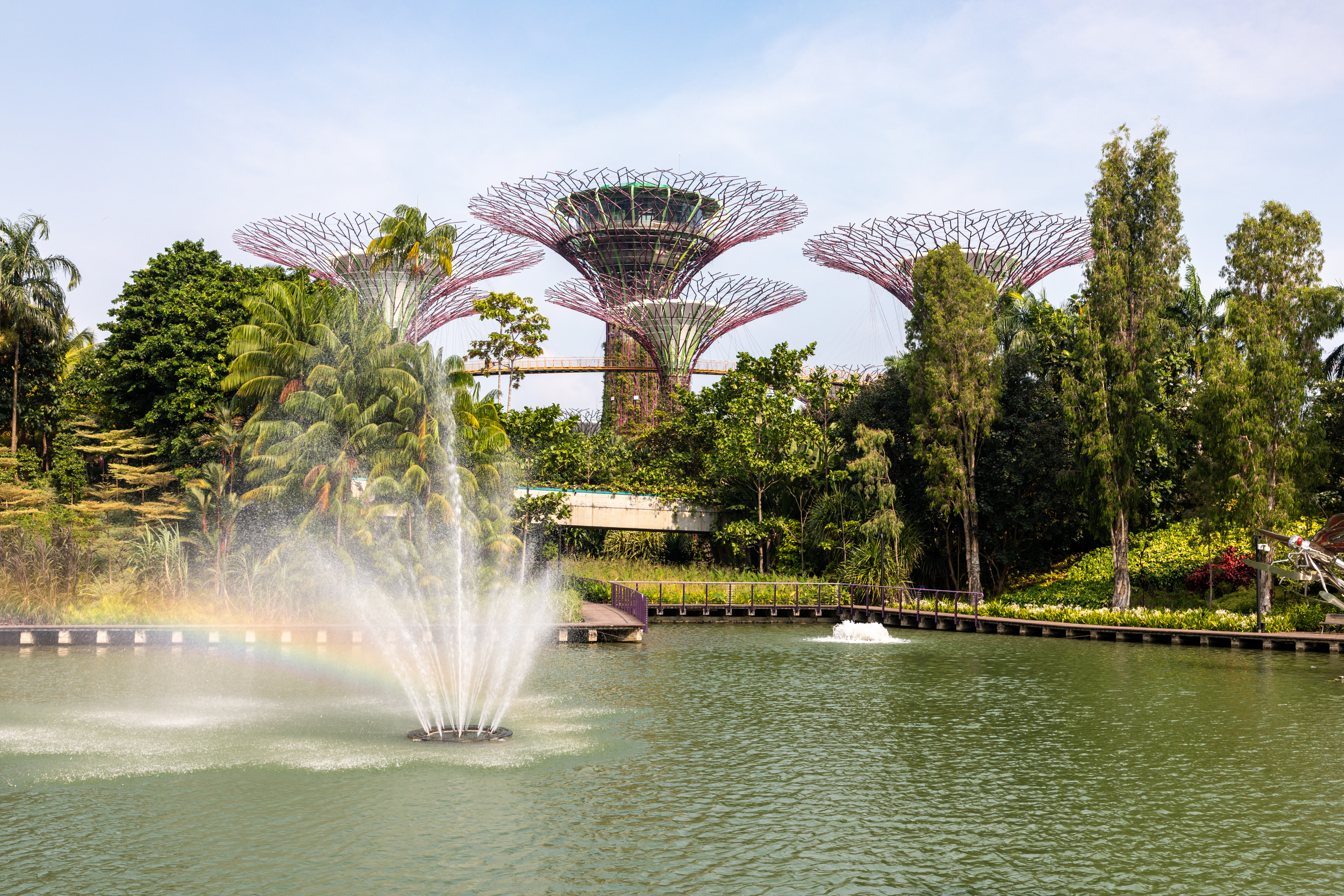
Supertrees with elevated walkway

There is an elevated walkway, the OCBC Skyway, between two larger Supertrees for visitors to enjoy a panoramic view of the Gardens. Every night, at 7:45pm and 8:45pm, the Supertree Grove comes alive with a coordinated light and music show known as the Garden Rhapsody. The accompanying music to the show changes every month or so, with selected themes such as "A World of Wonder" and "A Night of Musical Theatre", which features excerpts/pieces from films like The Little Mermaid (1989 film) and Pinocchio (1940 film).

The Supertree Observatory, opened on 27 December 2019, is housed inside the tallest Supertree, which is 50 metres tall. It comprises three levels, the ground floor, the Observatory Space and the Open-Air Rooftop Deck. Visitors would take the elevator up to the Observatory Space and thereafter take a flight of stairs up to the Rooftop Deck. The Observatory Space is located one level below the rooftop deck, and it consists of an indoor area with full-height glass windows and a peripheral outdoor walkway. Here, visitors can also experience a message about the effects of climate change conveyed through digital media. The Open-Air Rooftop Deck, which is an open-air observation deck on the canopy of this Supertree, offers 360-degree unblocked views of the Gardens and the Marina Bay area.

Italy's Pavilion in Expo 2015 featured a structure called Albero Della Vita (or "Tree of Life" in Italian), which proved visually similar to Singapore's Supertrees.

=== Far East Organization Children's Garden ===
Designed by Grant Associates, which also designed Gardens by the Bay, the Children's Garden was fully funded by Far East Organization for $10 million. This attraction was opened on 21 January 2014. The children's garden is near the treehouse and the adventure trail. The adventure trail consists of trampolines, balancing beams, hanging bridges and more.

It is open from Tuesdays to Fridays from 10 a.m. to 7 p.m. and on Saturdays, Sundays and public holidays from 9 a.m. to 9 p.m. It is closed on Mondays, or the next working day if Monday is a public holiday.

=== Horticultural-themed gardens ===
There are two distinctly different sets of horticultural-themed gardens, which centre on the horticultural heritage of the various cultural groups in Singapore and on the biology and ecology of the tropical rainforest. These gardens are an important part of the Gardens' edutainment programme, which aims to bring plant knowledge to the public.

The Heritage Gardens emphasize the various cultural groups in Singapore, the significant role that plants play in their respective cultures, and the country's colonial history. It also focuses on economically important plants in Singapore and Southeast Asia. The four gardens are the Indian Garden, the Chinese Garden, the Malay Garden and the Colonial Garden.

The World of Plants features a curated selection of plants that showcase the biodiversity of the tropical rainforest. It consists of six subthemes illustrated by six sub-gardens: Discovery, Web of Life, Fruits and Flowers, Understorey, World of Palms, and Secret Life of Trees.

=== Bayfront Plaza and Floral Fantasy ===
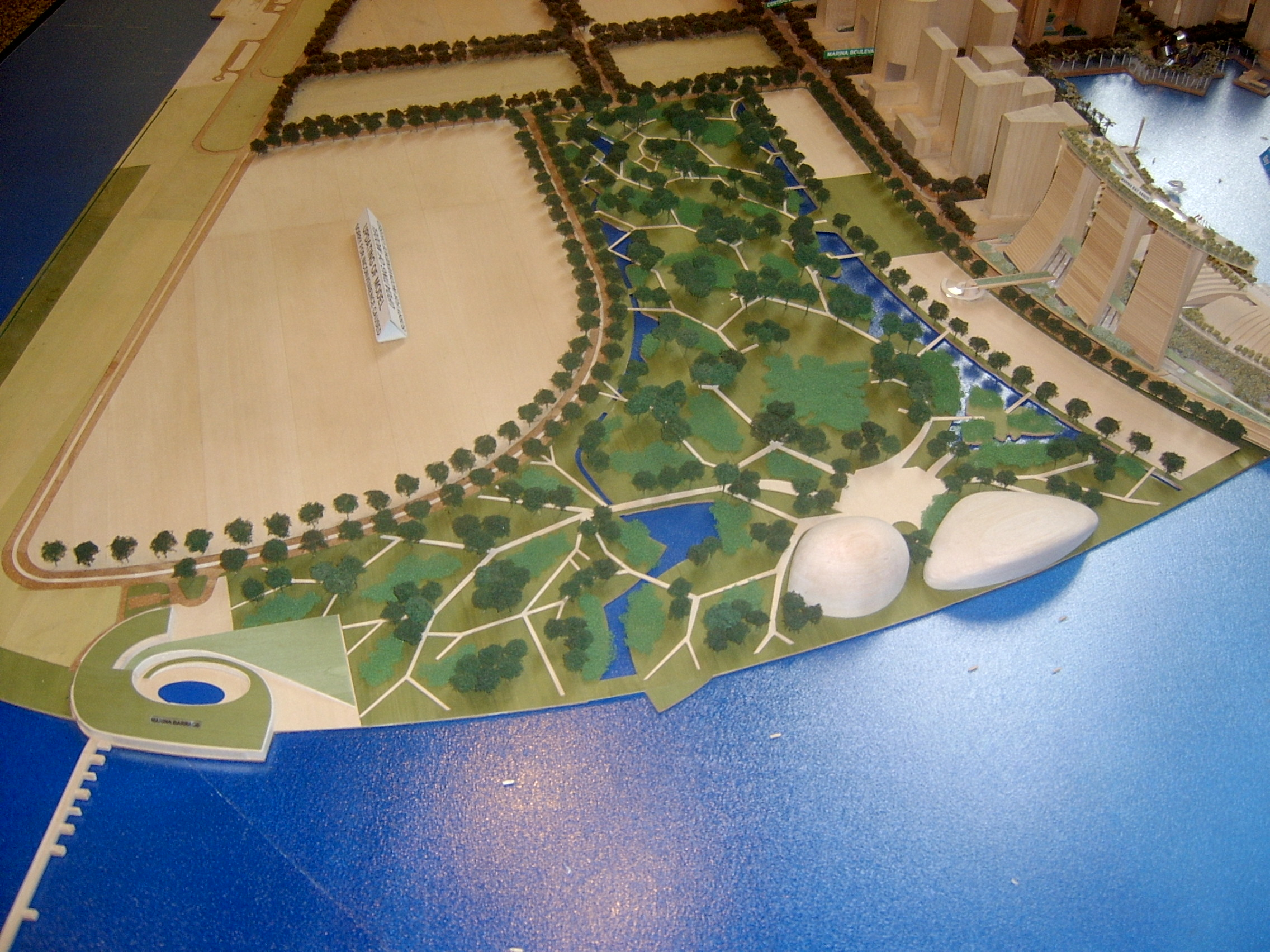
A model by the Urban Redevelopment Authority of the future garden at Marina South

The Bayfront Plaza is the main entry precinct into the Gardens from Bayfront MRT station. It includes Floral Fantasy, a 1,500-square-metre (16,000 sq ft) indoor attraction consisting of four floral artistry garden landscapes and a 4D multimedia ride simulating the journey of a dragonfly's flight path through Gardens by the Bay. Other venues within the Bayfront Plaza includes an indoor events space, the Bayfront Pavilion, a cafe and a pop-up market on weekends.

== Future Developments ==
=== Wetlands By The Bay ===
Wetlands by the Bay was announced on 4 March 2026 in Parliament by Minister of State for National Development Alvin Tan as a new attraction located in Bay South Gardens. Planned to open in stages starting from the end of 2028, it will consist of the current Kingfisher Wetlands, which would be expanded to contain over 50,000 plants of varying species, a new 1.2ha museum set up by teamLab, an international artist collective, and the current Satay by the Bay, which will be replaced by a two-storey block. Satay by the Bay is slated to close on 1 October 2026. In total, Wetlands by the Bay will occupy approximately 5ha. According to Alvin Tan, the attraction will funded by Gardens by the Bay. However, the cost of the attraction was not stated.

A new bridge, expected to open in 2027 at a cost of SG$75.7 million, will also be built to link up Bay South Garden and Bay East Garden. The bridge will be roughly 550m long and have a maximum width of 5.8m, and can be used by pedestrians, cyclists, and persons using mobility aids.

== Budget ==
The final construction cost for the project, not including the price of the land but including an access road, drainage works, and soil improvement, was within a $1.035 billion allocated budget. The annual operating cost was expected to be approximately $58 million, of which $28 million was for operation of the Conservatory buildings. The project received 1.7 million visitors between June and October 2012, who had free admission to most portions of the park but were required to purchase tickets for entering the Conservatories.

In 2006, an international competition for the design of the park was held, attracting more than 70 entries submitted by 170 firms from 24 countries. Two British firms – Grant Associates and Gustafson Porter – were awarded the contracts for the Bay South and Bay East Gardens respectively.

Alongside the lead designers Grant Associates, the design team for Bay South included WilkinsonEyre, Atelier Ten (environmental design consultants) and Atelier One (structural engineers). They were supported by a number of Singapore firms including CPG Consultants (architecture, civil and structural, mechanical and electrical), Meinhardt Infrastructure (civil and structural), Langdon & Seah (cost consultants) and PMLink (project management).

== Transportation ==
GBTB is well connected by public transportation. The nearest Mass Rapid Transit (MRT) train stations are its namesake Gardens by the Bay MRT station on the Thomson–East Coast Line (TEL), as well as Bayfront MRT station on the Circle (CCL) and Downtown (DTL) lines.

The public bus service of 400, operated by SBS Transit, also serves GBTB.

== In popular culture ==
- The planet of Xandar in the film adaptation of Guardians of the Galaxy took inspiration from the location.
- The documentary series Planet Earth II features the Supertree Grove in Episode 7, "A World of Wonder."
- The park was featured in the 2015 film Hitman: Agent 47.
- An entire mission is set within the gardens in the 2015 video game Call of Duty: Black Ops III.
- The anime series Plastic Memories features locations inspired by the supertrees in the gardens.
- The Supertree Grove in the park was featured in the 2018 film Crazy Rich Asians.
- The Singapore track in the video game Asphalt Legends Unite incorporates the Gardens by the Bay.
- Some of the illustrations for the Neom project were borrowed from the Gardens by the Bay in Singapore, leading commentators to observe that using an actual image of Singapore to represent a future construction project in Saudi Arabia is an unusual choice.
- The Singapore Speedway track in the video games Mario Kart Tour and Mario Kart 8 Deluxe incorporates the Gardens by the Bay as a prominent feature of the Singapore landscape. The racers drive up and over the OCBC Skywalk past the Supertrees.

== Events ==
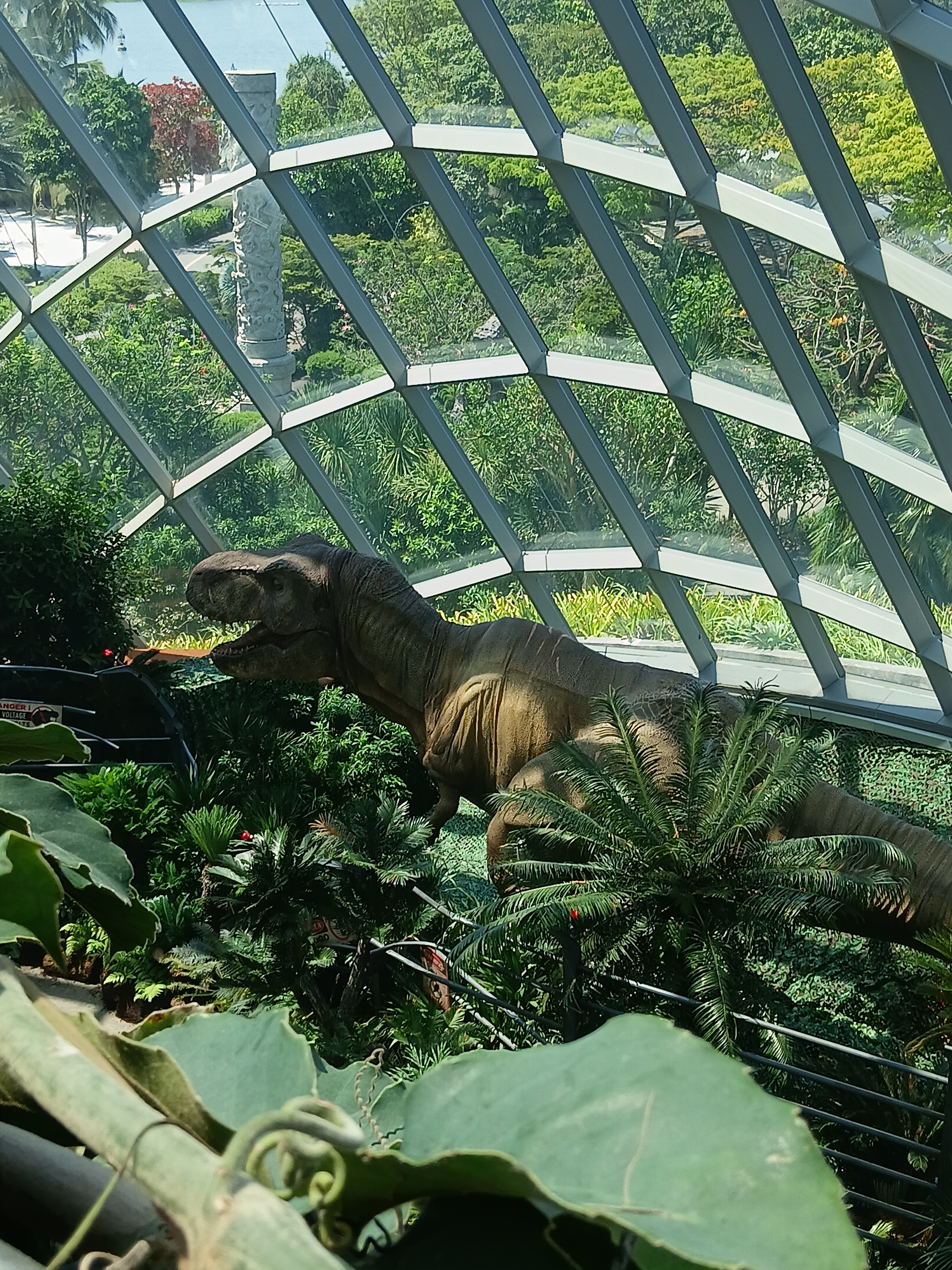
T-Rex model during the Jurassic World exhibition in the Cloud Forest

Gardens by the Bay hosts different events and exhibitions throughout the year, including during festivals such as the Lunar New Year, National Day, Mid-Autumn Festival and Christmas.

== Gallery ==
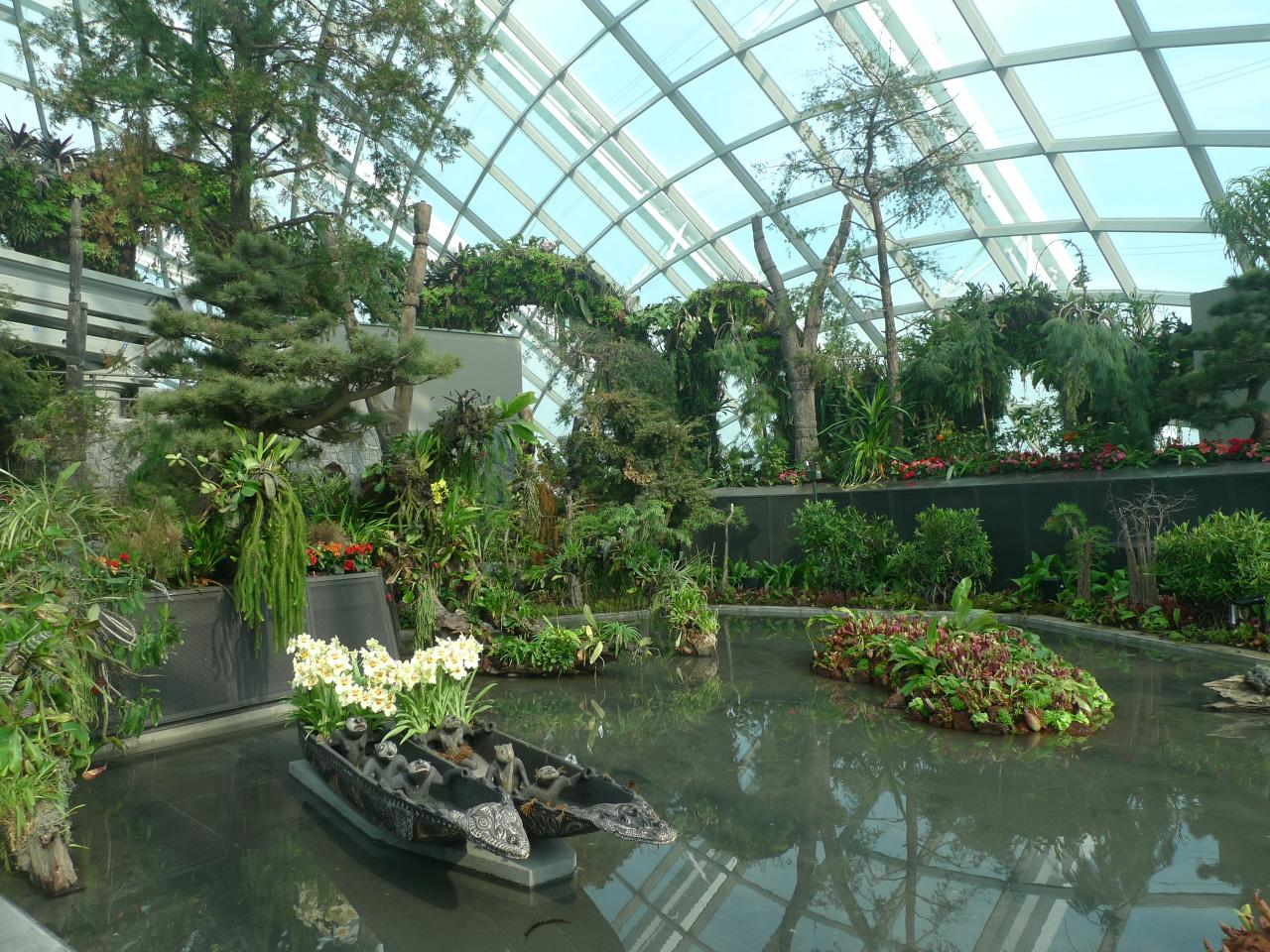
The Lost World

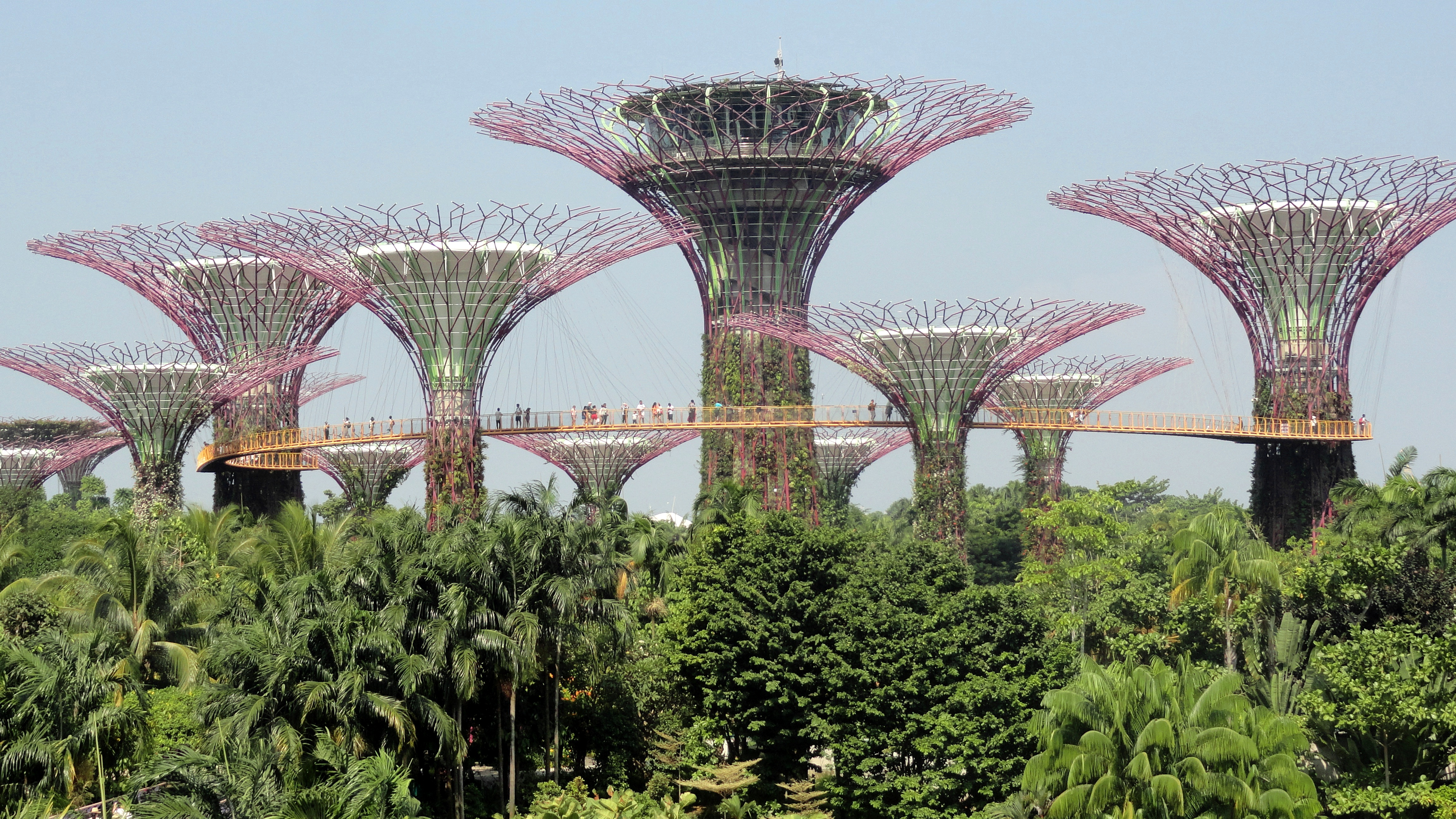
Supertree Grove

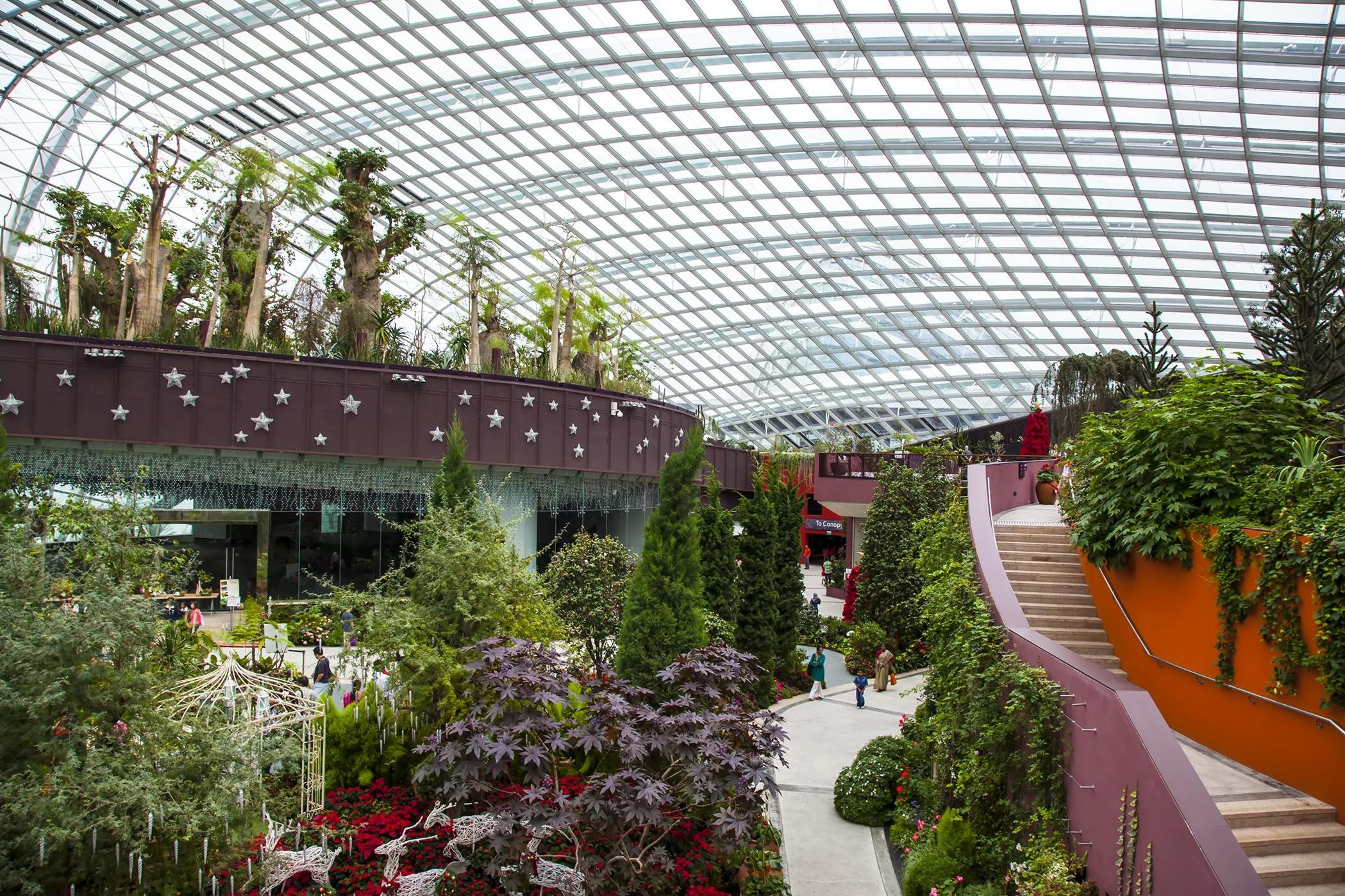
Interior of the Flower Dome

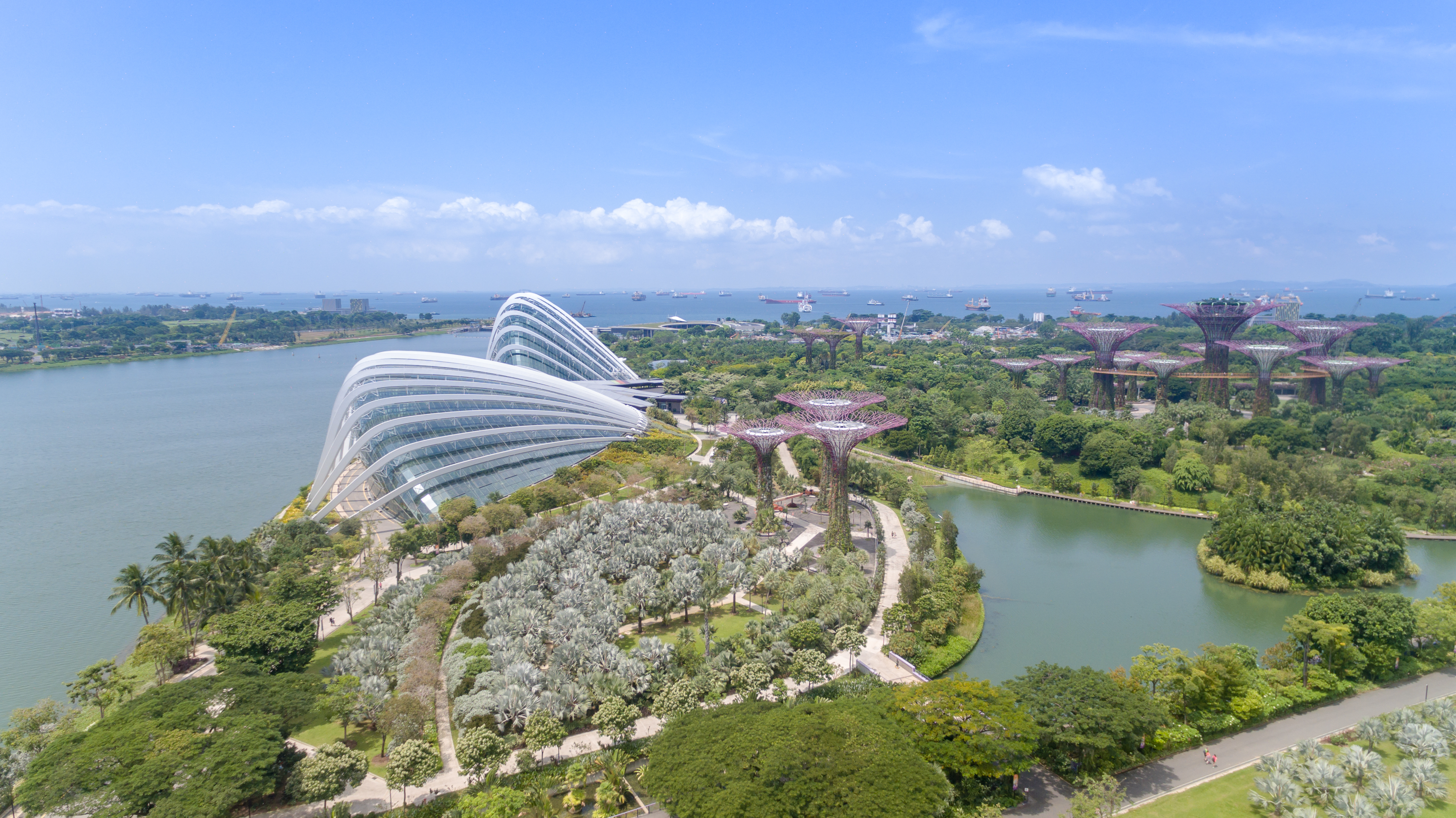
Aerial shot of Gardens by the Bay

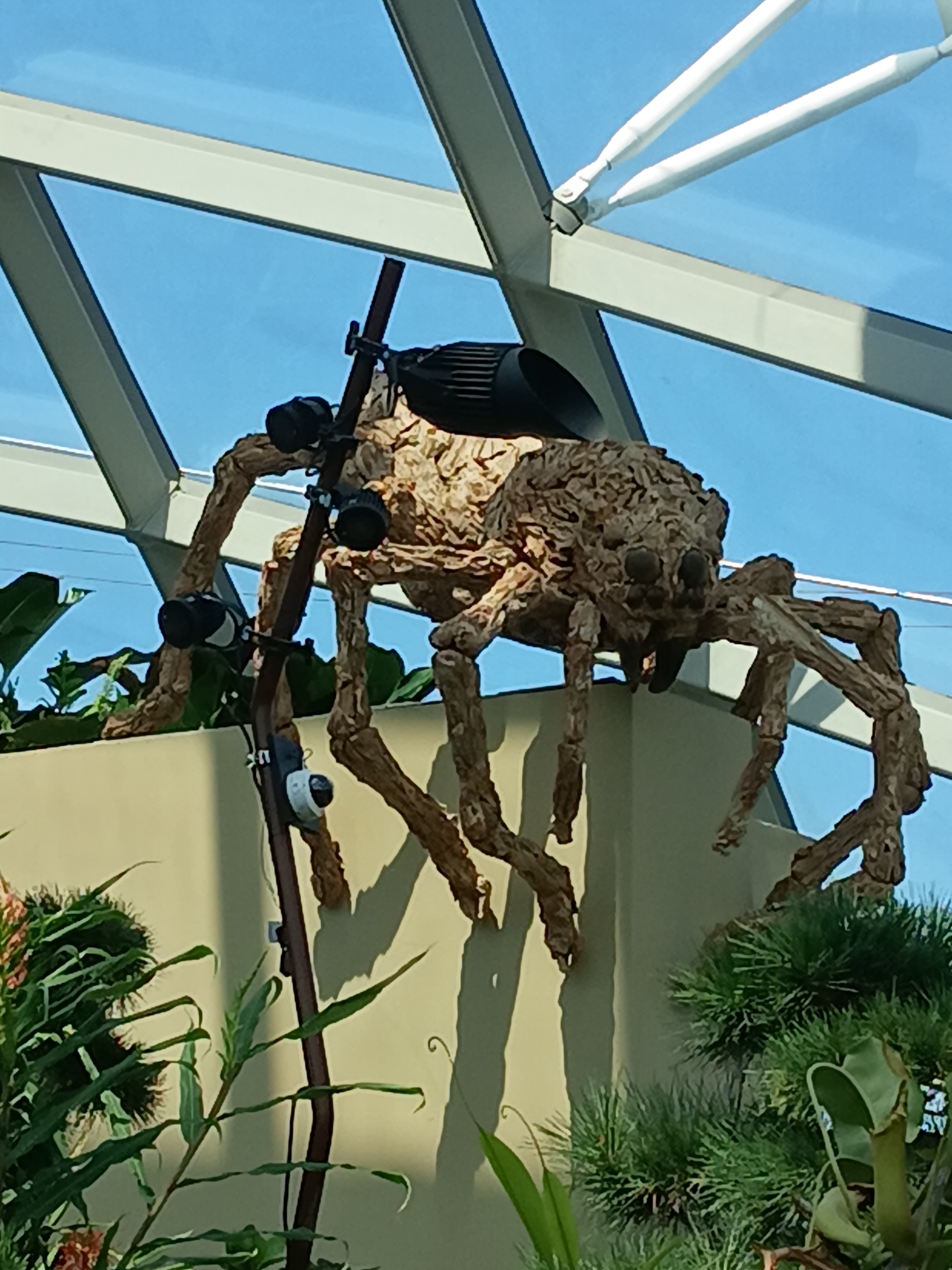
Spider model in Gardens By The Bay (Singapore)

== See also ==
- List of parks in Singapore
- National Parks Board
