= Andrew Grant (landscape architect) =

British landscape architect

Andrew Steven Grant (born October 1958) is a British landscape architect. He studied landscape architecture at Edinburgh College of Art under the tutorage of David Skinner, graduating in 1982. He is best known as the founder and director of Grant Associates, with offices in Bath, UK and Singapore. His notable works include Singapore’s Gardens by the Bay, which won the World Building Project of the Year in 2012. He was a TEDxBath speaker in 2020 and is a Design Review Panellist for Design West.

In 1997, he founded Grant Associates, a practice focuses on ecology, biodiversity, and climate resilience in landscape architecture. The studio has delivered projects across Europe, Asia, and Australia, often in collaboration with architects, ecologists, and engineers.

== Work ==
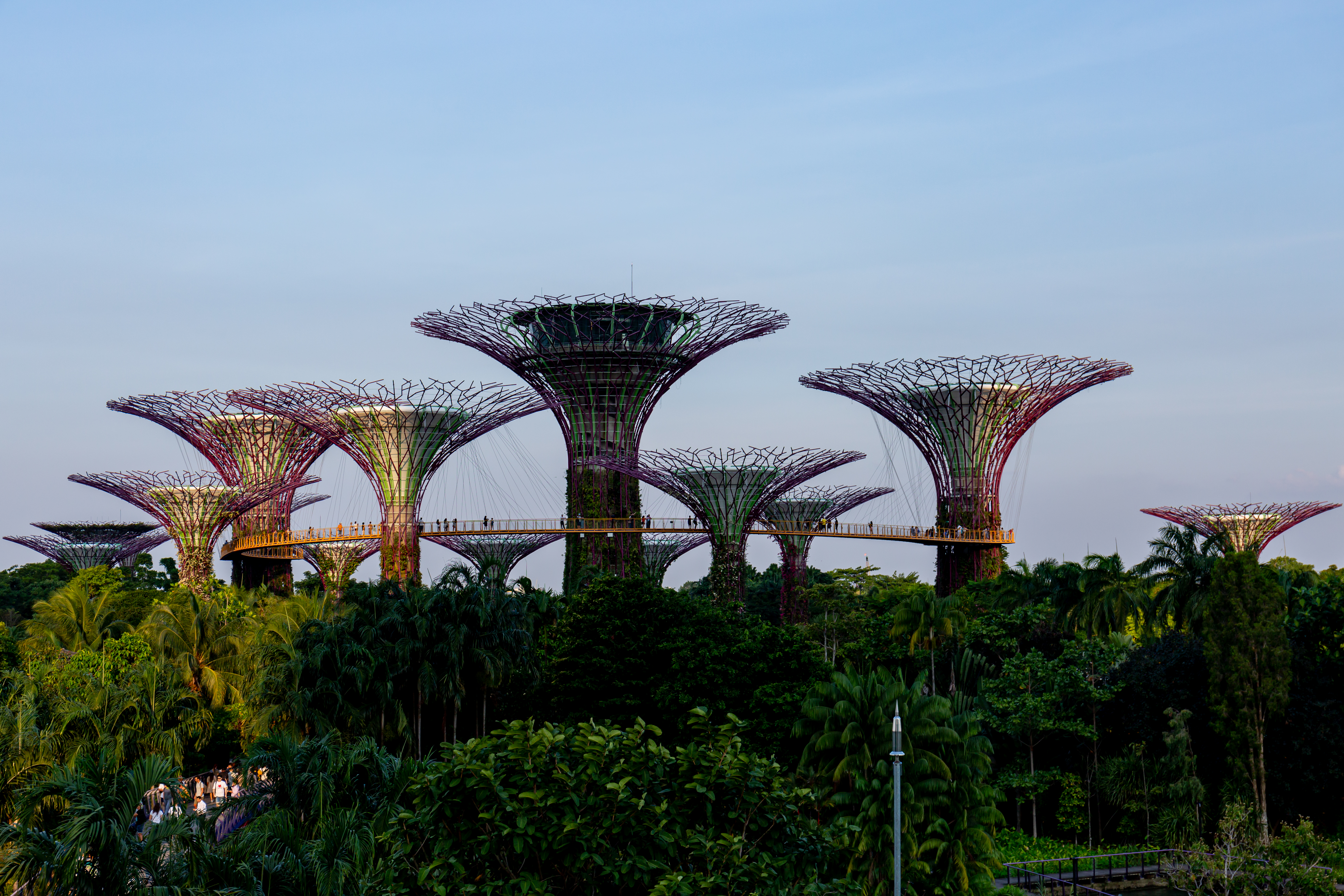
The Supertree Grove in the Gardens by the Bay.

=== Gardens by the Bay, Singapore ===
A 54-hectare landmark horticultural and ecological park completed in 2012 as part of Singapore’s strategy to become a “City in a Garden” now known as Gardens by the Bay, Singapore. The project was led by Grant Associates (landscape architects) with WilkinsonEyre (architects). It features the iconic cooled conservatories, the Supertree Grove with vertical planting and environmental technologies, and extensive gardens. The design integrates biodiversity, water-sensitive systems, and visitor experience, establishing as an ambitious examples of urban landscape architecture and ecological design. The Supertrees at Gardens by the Bay were featured in David Attenborough BBC’s Planet Earth II TV series, episode 6 in 2016.

=== Accordia, Cambridge ===
A housing scheme designed with architects Feilden Clegg Bradley Studios, Alison Brooks Architects, and Maccreanor Lavington, with Grant Associates. Completed in 2006, with communal garden, green corridors, and play spaces prioritised over private gardens. In 2008, it became the first housing development to win the RIBA Stirling Prize.

=== Kempegowda International Airport Terminal 2, Bengaluru, India ===
Known as the “Garden Terminal”, T2 opened in 2022 with a biophilic design approach. The project, designed by Skidmore, Owings & Merrill (SOM) with landscape architecture by Grant Associates, integrates extensive planting throughout, including indoor hanging gardens, outdoor courtyards, green walls, and large areas of native planting.

=== Appleby Blue Almshouse, London ===
Completed in 2023 for the United St Saviour's Charity and designed by Witherford Watson Mann with Grant Associates, the project reinterprets the traditional almshouse model. It provides 57 affordable homes for older people arranged around a landscaped courtyard with gardens, terraces and shared spaces intended to support community life. The design incorporates accessible routes and communal outdoor areas to promote social connection and wellbeing. The project won the RIBA Stirling Prize in 2025.

== Awards and honours ==
- Appointed Royal Designer for Industry (RDI) in 2012 for contributions to landscape architecture.
- Awarded an Honorary Doctorate of Letters by Bath Spa University in 2023.
- Honorary Fellow of the Royal Institute of British Architects (RIBA) in 2011

== Academic and civic roles ==
- Visiting Professor for the Department of Landscape, University of Sheffield
- Member of the National Infrastructure Commission Design Group
- Chair of the Bathscape Landscape Partnership and member of the Bath World Heritage Site Advisory Board.
- Co-founder of Forest of Imagination, an annual Bath-based arts and ecology festival.

== Publications ==
- Authored the essay “Landscape Cities” in Cities of Opportunities: Connecting Culture and Innovation (Routledge, 2020), promoting cities defined by living landscapes and ecological sustainability.
