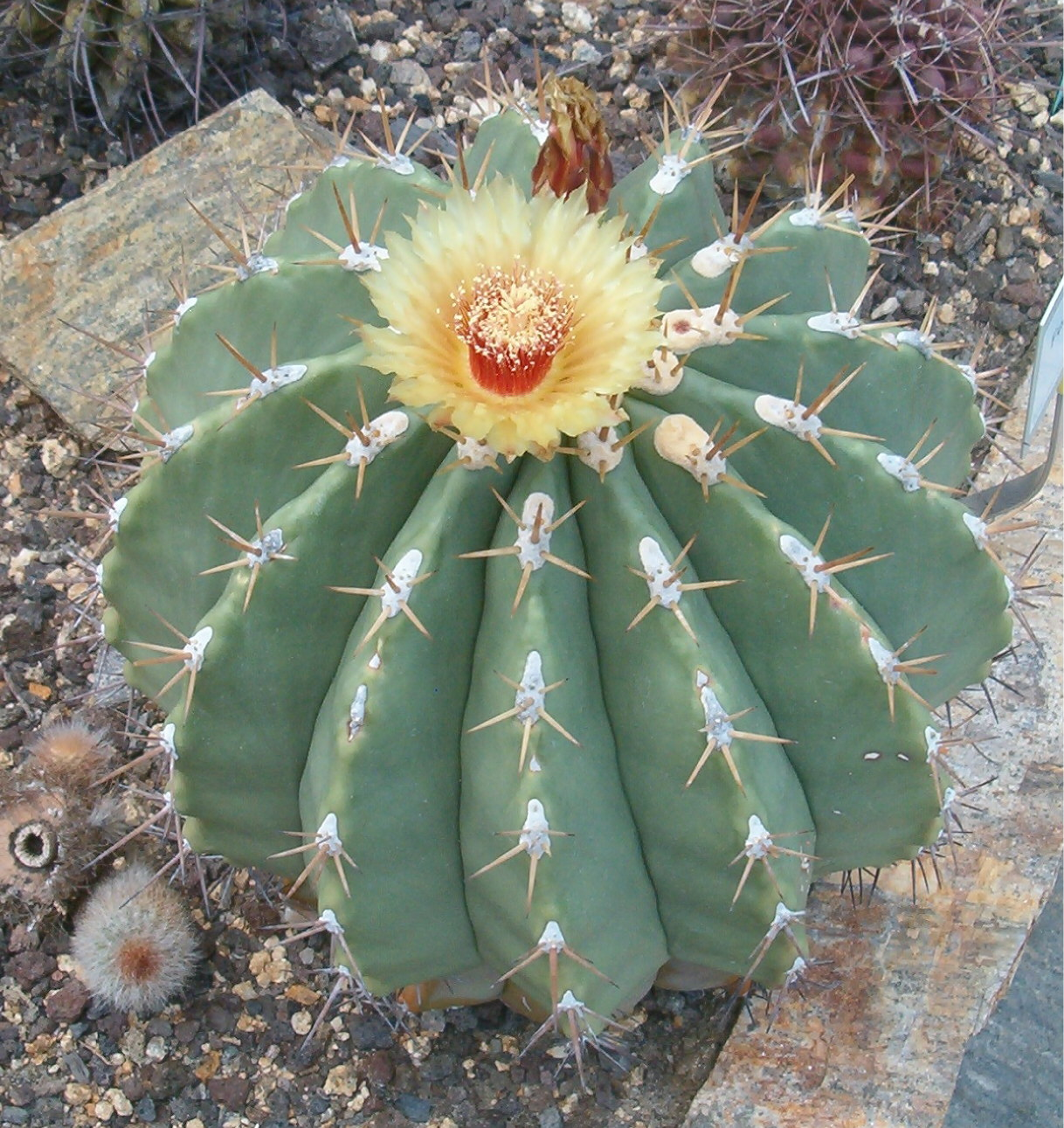

Conservation status
- Near Threatened (IUCN 3.1)

Scientific classification
- Kingdom: Plantae
- Clade: Tracheophytes
- Clade: Angiosperms
- Clade: Eudicots
- Order: Caryophyllales
- Family: Cactaceae
- Subfamily: Cactoideae
- Genus: Ferocactus
- Species: F. pottsii

Binomial name
- Ferocactus pottsii (Salm-Dyck) Backeb. 1961

Synonyms
- Echinocactus bicolor f. pottsii (Salm-Dyck) Voss 1894; Echinocactus pottsii Salm-Dyck 1850; Thelocactus bicolor var. pottsii (Salm-Dyck) Backeb. 1961; Thelocactus pottsii (Salm-Dyck) Britton & Rose 1923; Echinocactus bicolor var. pottsii Salm-Dyck 1850

= Ferocactus pottsii =

Species of cactus

Ferocactus pottsii is a species of Ferocactus from Mexico. The specific epithet has also been spelt pottsi.

== Description ==
Ferocactus pottsii is a solitary cactus with spherical to short cylindrical, glaucous green shoots. It grows up to 1 meter tall and 50 cm (20 in) in diameter, with 13 to 25 broad, blunt ribs. The areoles are elongated and woolly, about 1.5 mm (0.059 in) long, with straight gray spines. The central spine can reach up to 7.5 cm (3.0 in) long, while the three to eight radial spines reach up to 4.5 cm (1.8 in) in length.

Its cup-shaped, yellow flowers can grow up to 4.5 cm (1.8 in) long and 3.5 cm (1.4 in) in diameter. The spherical fruits are yellow and can reach up to 4 cm (1.6 in) in length.

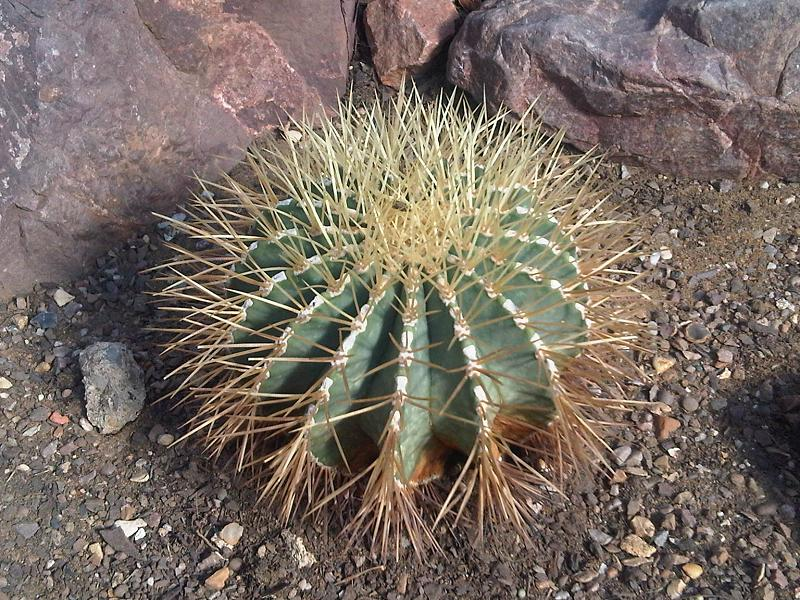
Plant

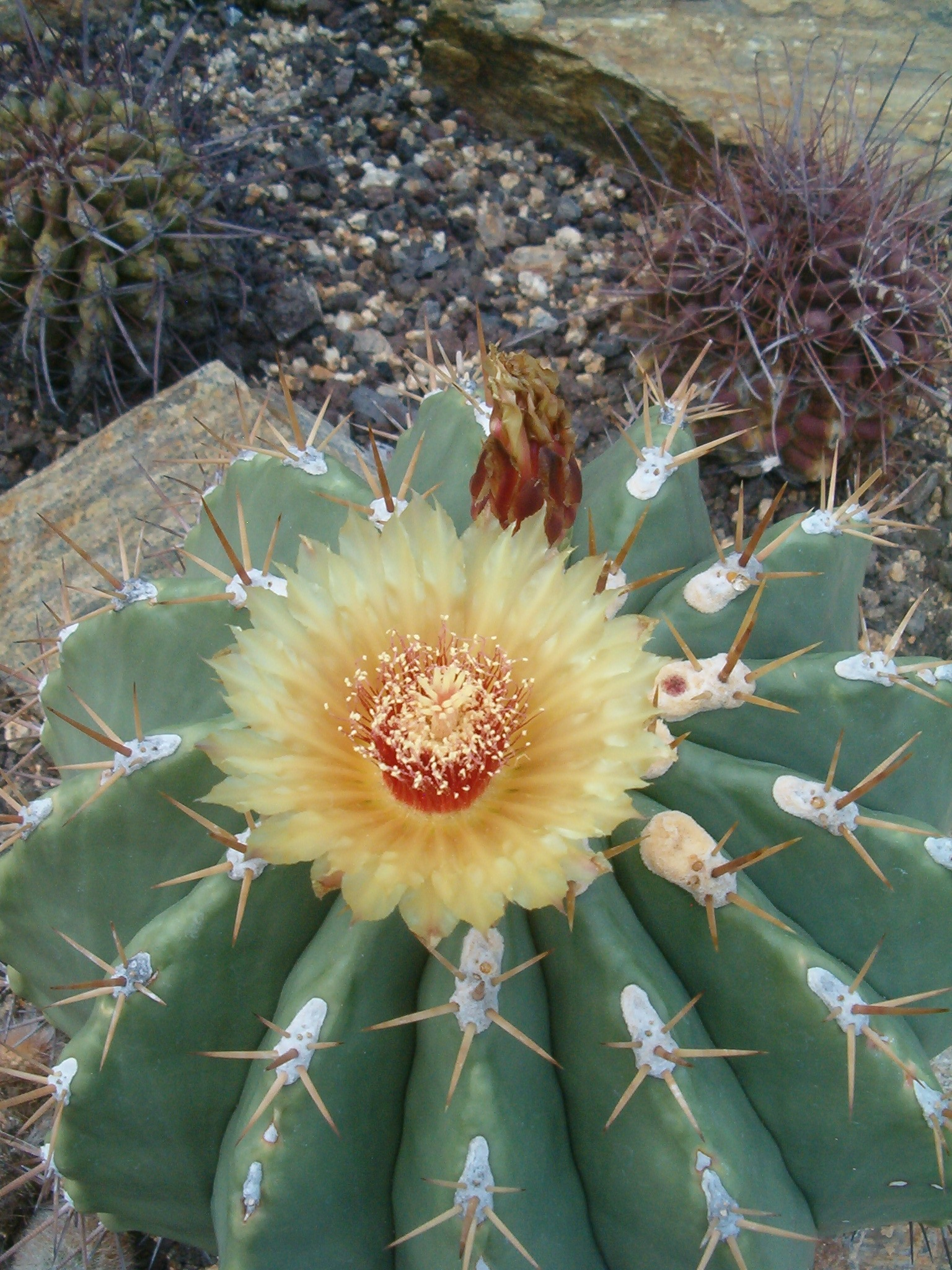
Flower

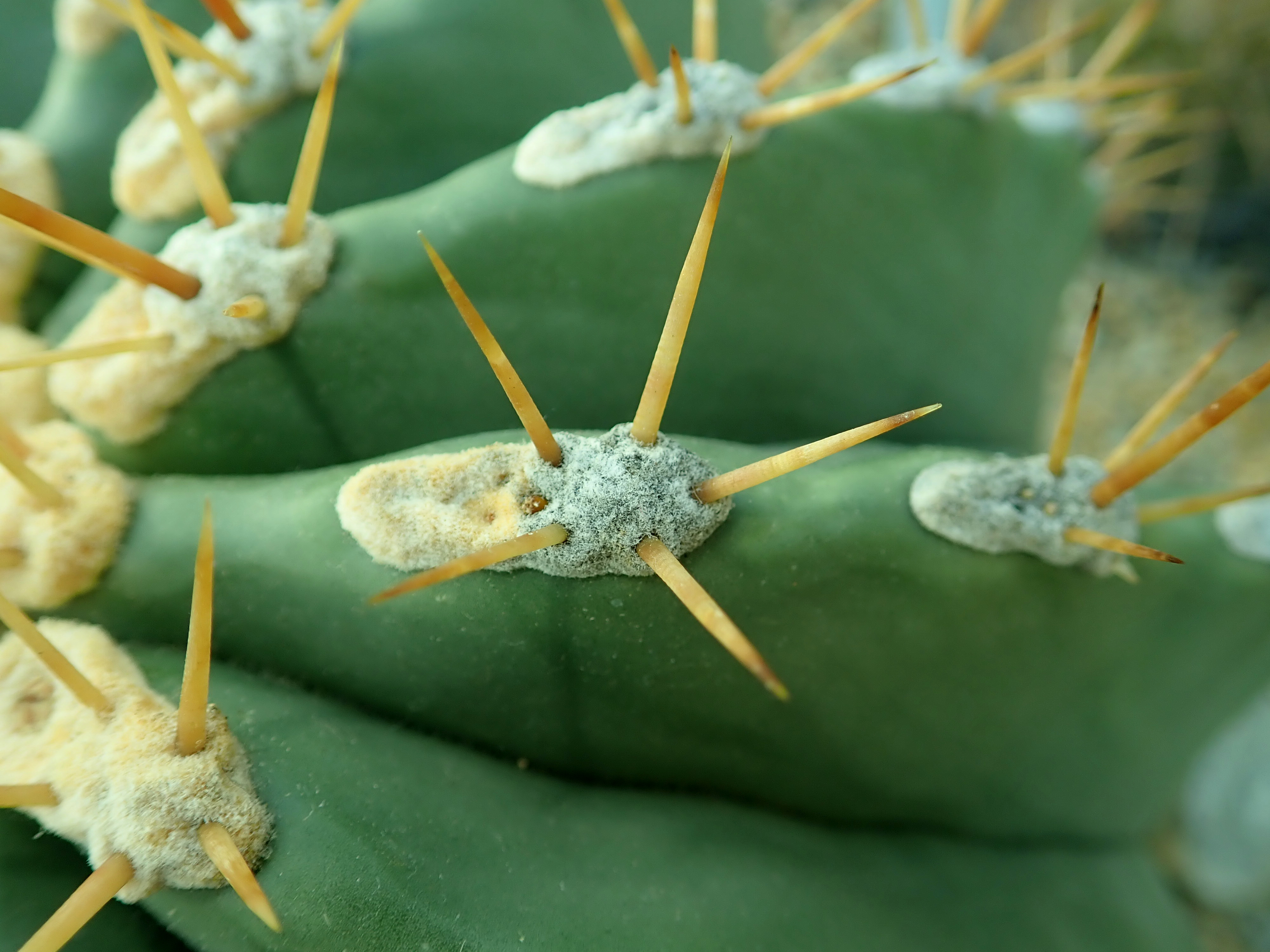
Areoles and spines

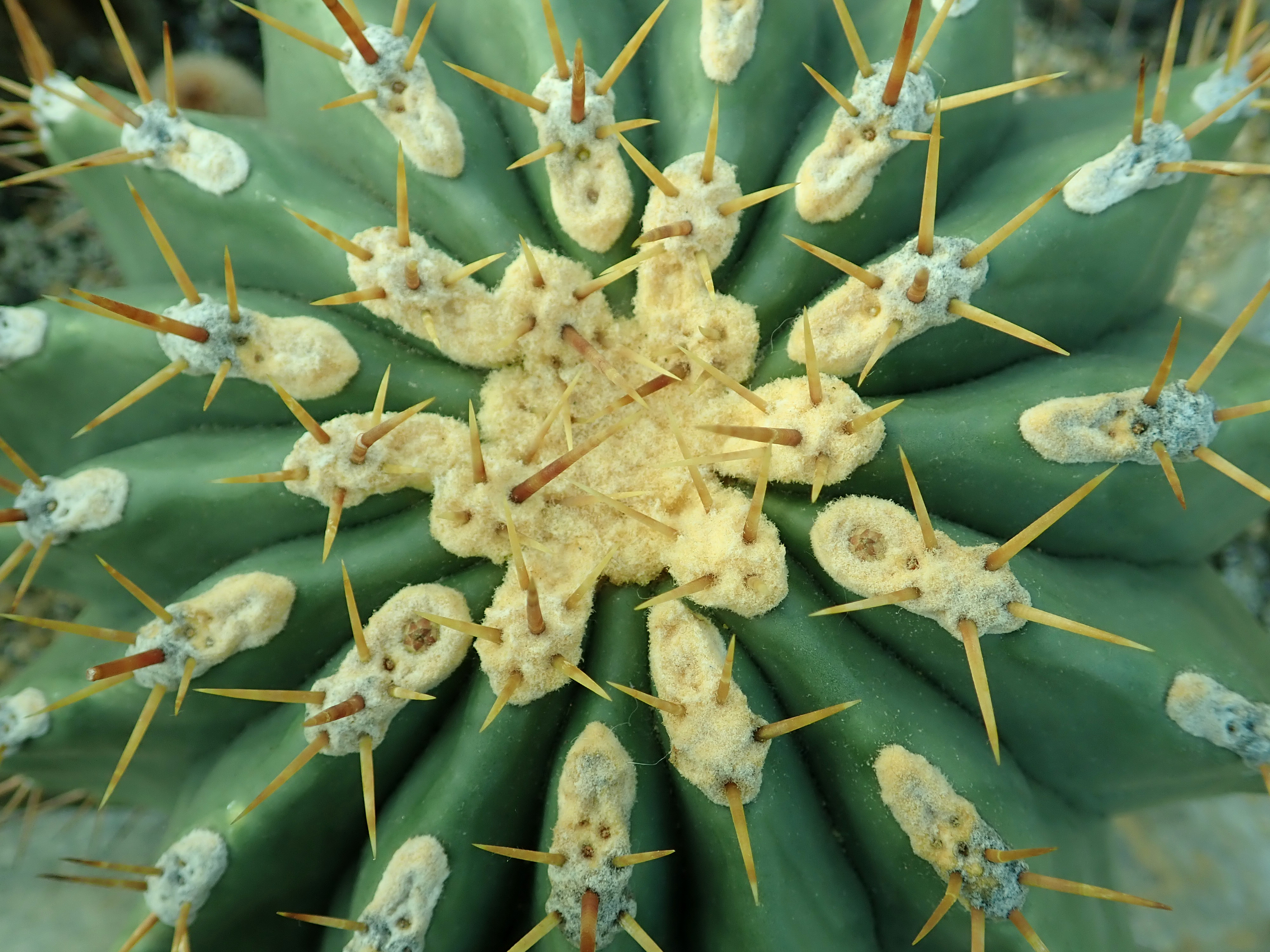
Top center of plant

== Distribution ==
This cactus is found in tropical deciduous and pine forests in the Mexican states of Chihuahua, Sonora, and Sinaloa, at elevations of 240 to 1000 meters.

== Taxonomy ==
First described as Echinocactus pottsii in 1850 by Joseph zu Salm-Reifferscheidt-Dyck, it was later placed in the genus Ferocactus by Curt Backeberg in 1961. The specific epithet "pottsii" honors John Potts, a director of the mint in Chihuahua.
