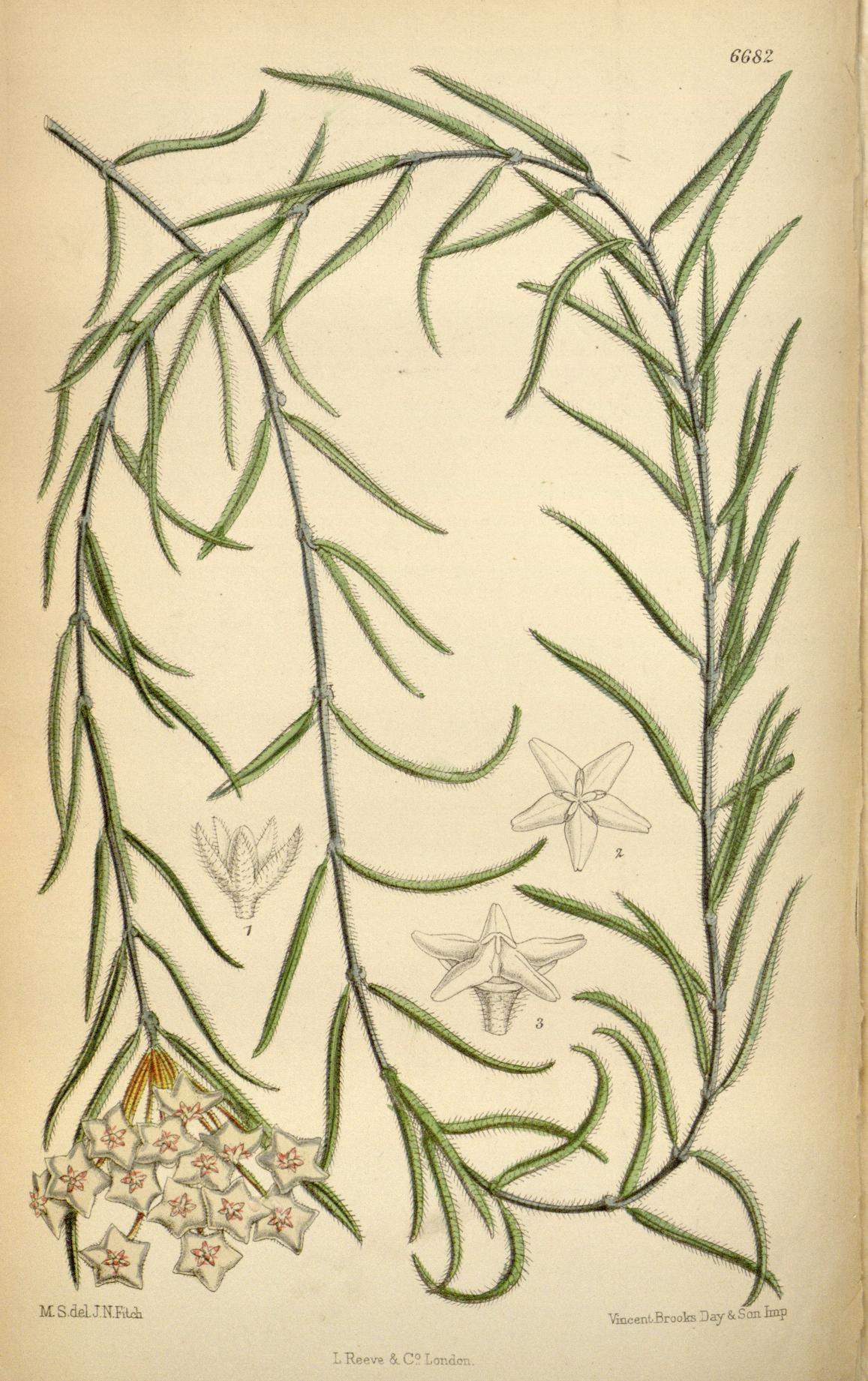
- Hoya linearis illustrated in 1883

Scientific classification
- Kingdom: Plantae
- Clade: Embryophytes
- Clade: Tracheophytes
- Clade: Angiosperms
- Clade: Eudicots
- Clade: Asterids
- Order: Gentianales
- Family: Apocynaceae
- Genus: Hoya
- Species: H. linearis

Binomial name
- Hoya linearis Wall ex. D.Don

= Hoya linearis =

Species of flowering plant

Hoya linearis is a species of flowering plant in the genus Hoya native to China, Nepal, India, and Myanmar.

== Description ==
This species is known for its distinctive foliage with 1–2 inches (25–51 mm) nearly cylindrical leaves.

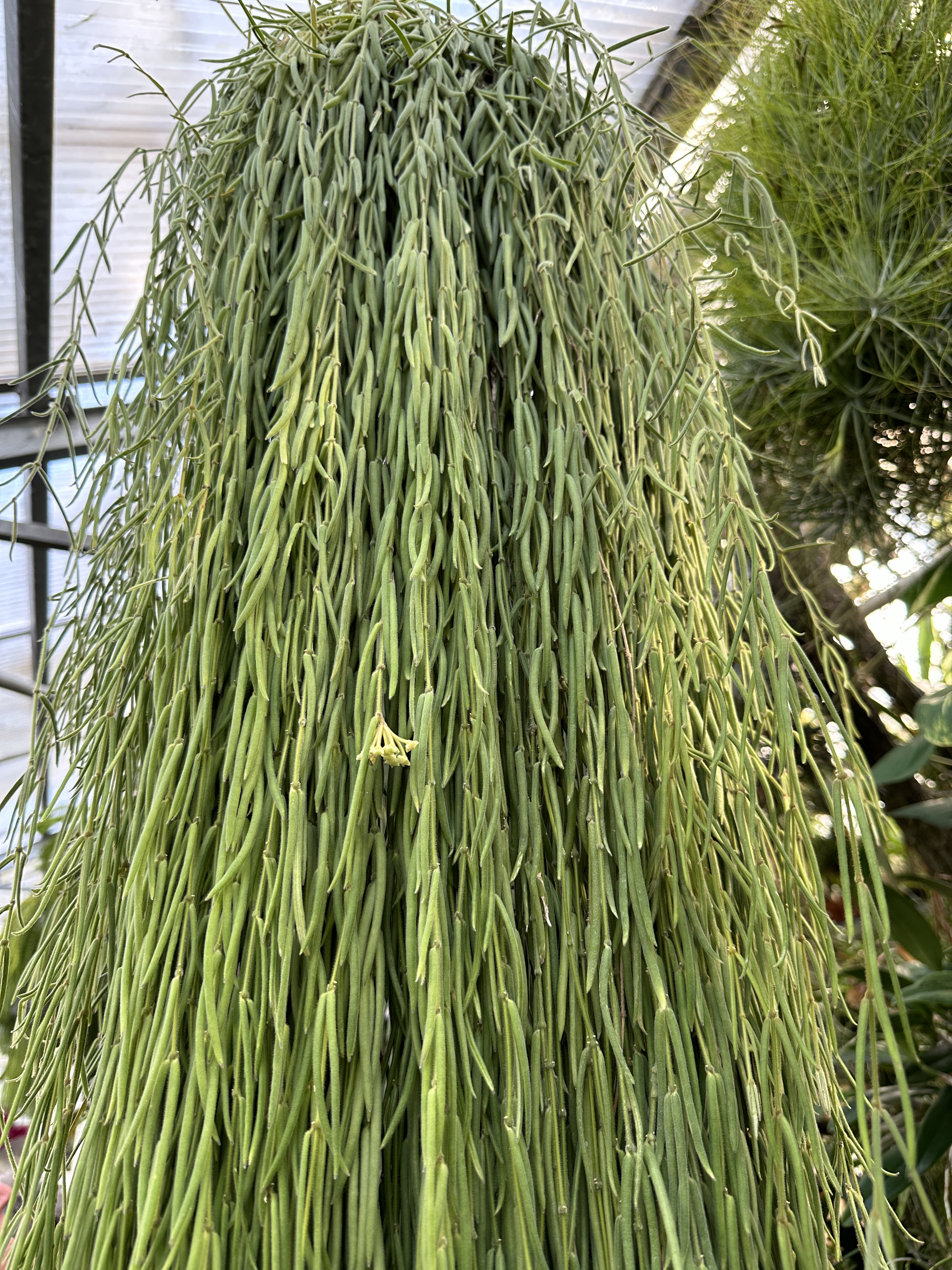

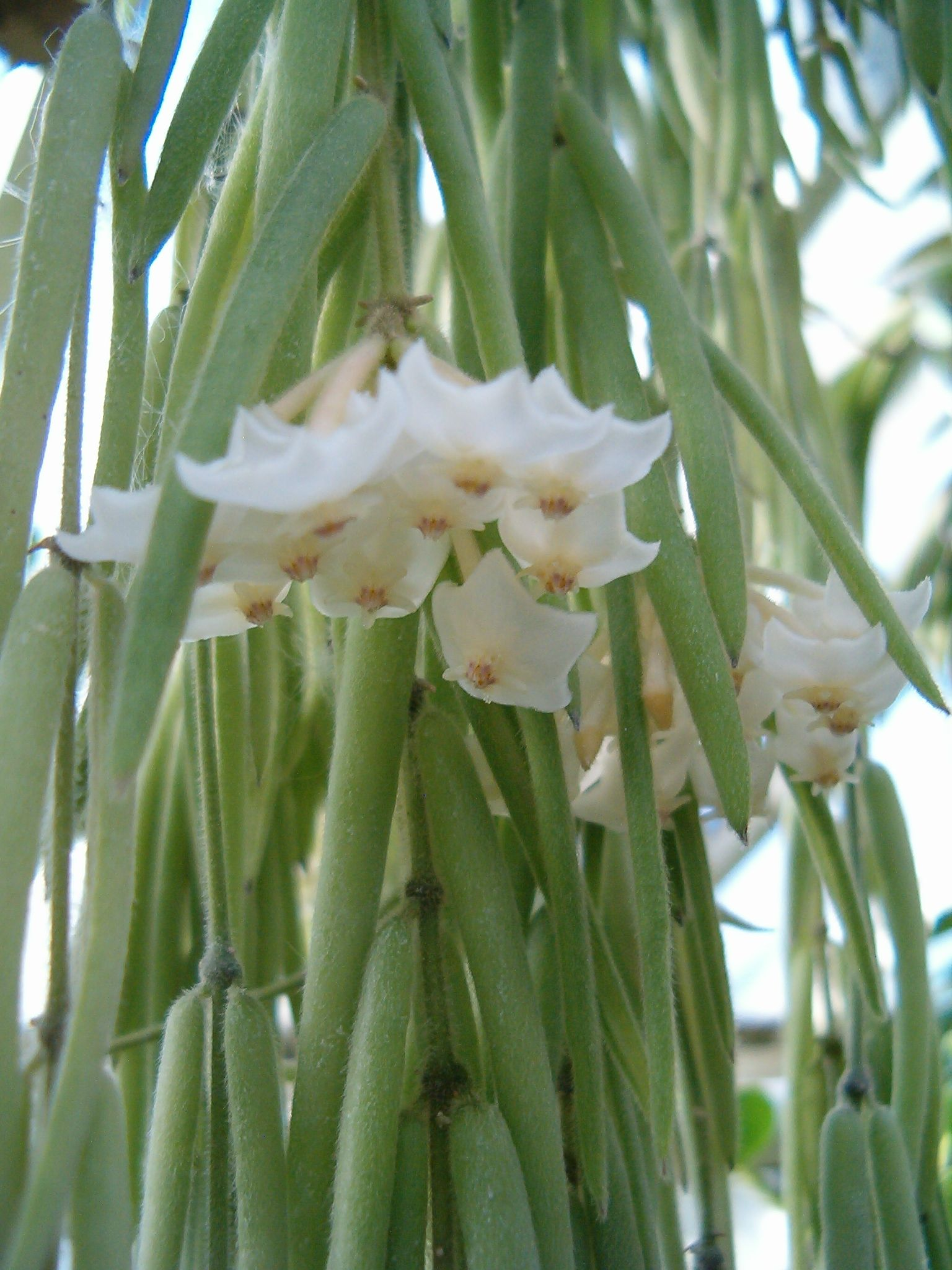
