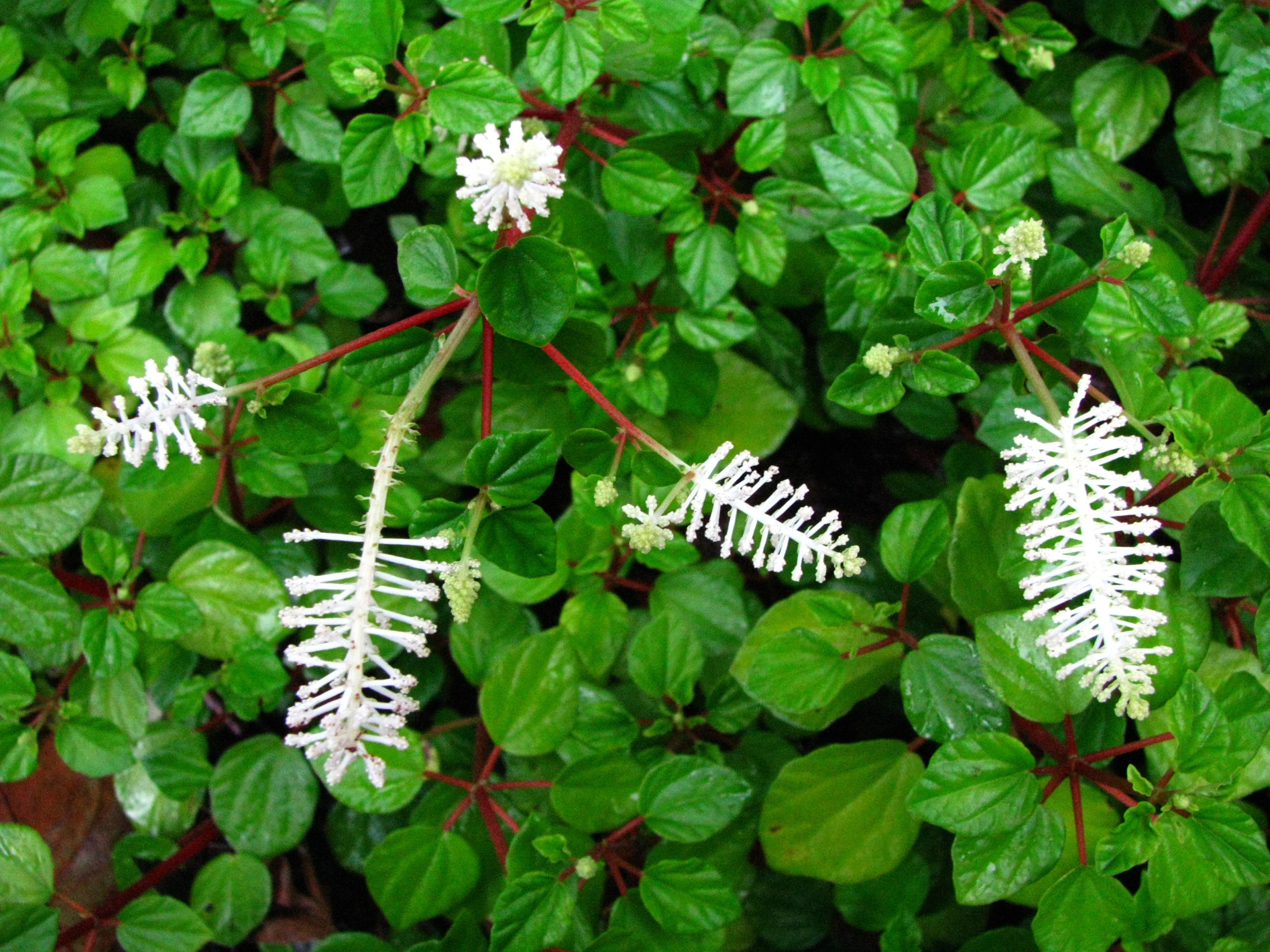

Scientific classification
- Kingdom: Plantae
- Clade: Tracheophytes
- Clade: Angiosperms
- Clade: Magnoliids
- Order: Piperales
- Family: Piperaceae
- Genus: Peperomia
- Species: P. fraseri

Binomial name
- Peperomia fraseri C.DC.

Synonyms
- List: Peperomia fraseri var. peltata Yunck.; Peperomia resediflora Linden & André; Peperomia treleasei Standl. & Steyerm.; Trigonanthera resediflora (Linden & André) André

= Peperomia fraseri =

Species of plant

Peperomia fraseri, commonly known as the flowering pepper, is a species of plant in the genus Peperomia of the family Piperaceae. Its native range covers Colombia and Peru. It has also been introduced to Ecuador and Guatemala.

== Description ==
Peperomia fraseri is a small shrub with upright stems carrying rounded or heart-shaped glossy green leaves with incised venation. It is rare among Peperomias, which mostly carry rather unremarkable tail-like flower spikes, in that it has more noticeable inflorescence: a reddish peduncle with subtly fragrant white bottle-brush flowers.
