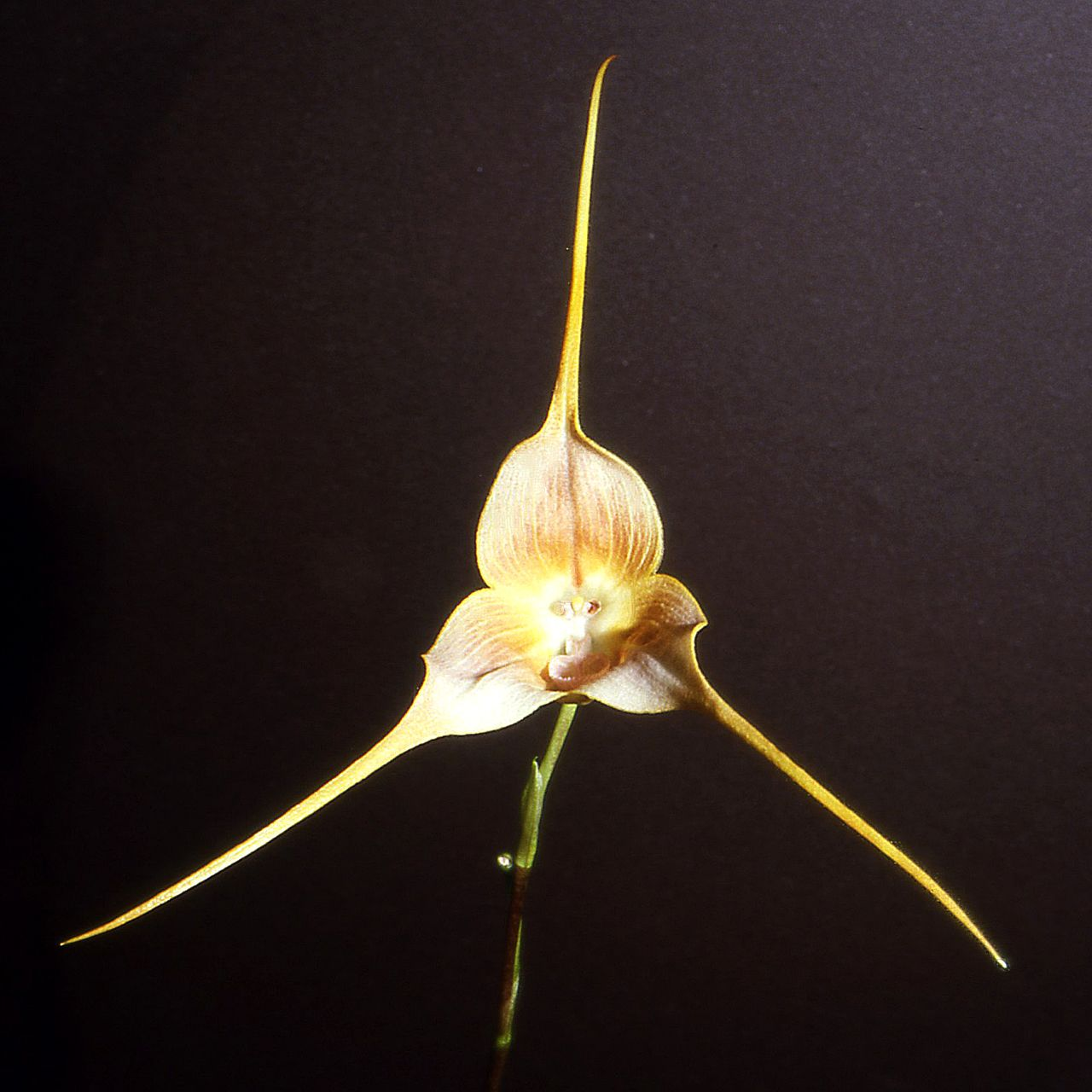

Scientific classification
- Kingdom: Plantae
- Clade: Tracheophytes
- Clade: Angiosperms
- Clade: Monocots
- Order: Asparagales
- Family: Orchidaceae
- Subfamily: Epidendroideae
- Genus: Dracula
- Species: D. gigas

Binomial name
- Dracula gigas (Luer & Andreetta) Luer

Synonyms
- Masdevallia gigas Luer & Andreetta (Basionym)

= Dracula gigas =

Species of orchid

Dracula gigas is a species of orchid. It is sometimes called the monkey orchid because it resembles the face of a monkey. This common name is shared with Orchis simia.

== See also ==
- Monkey orchid (disambiguation)
