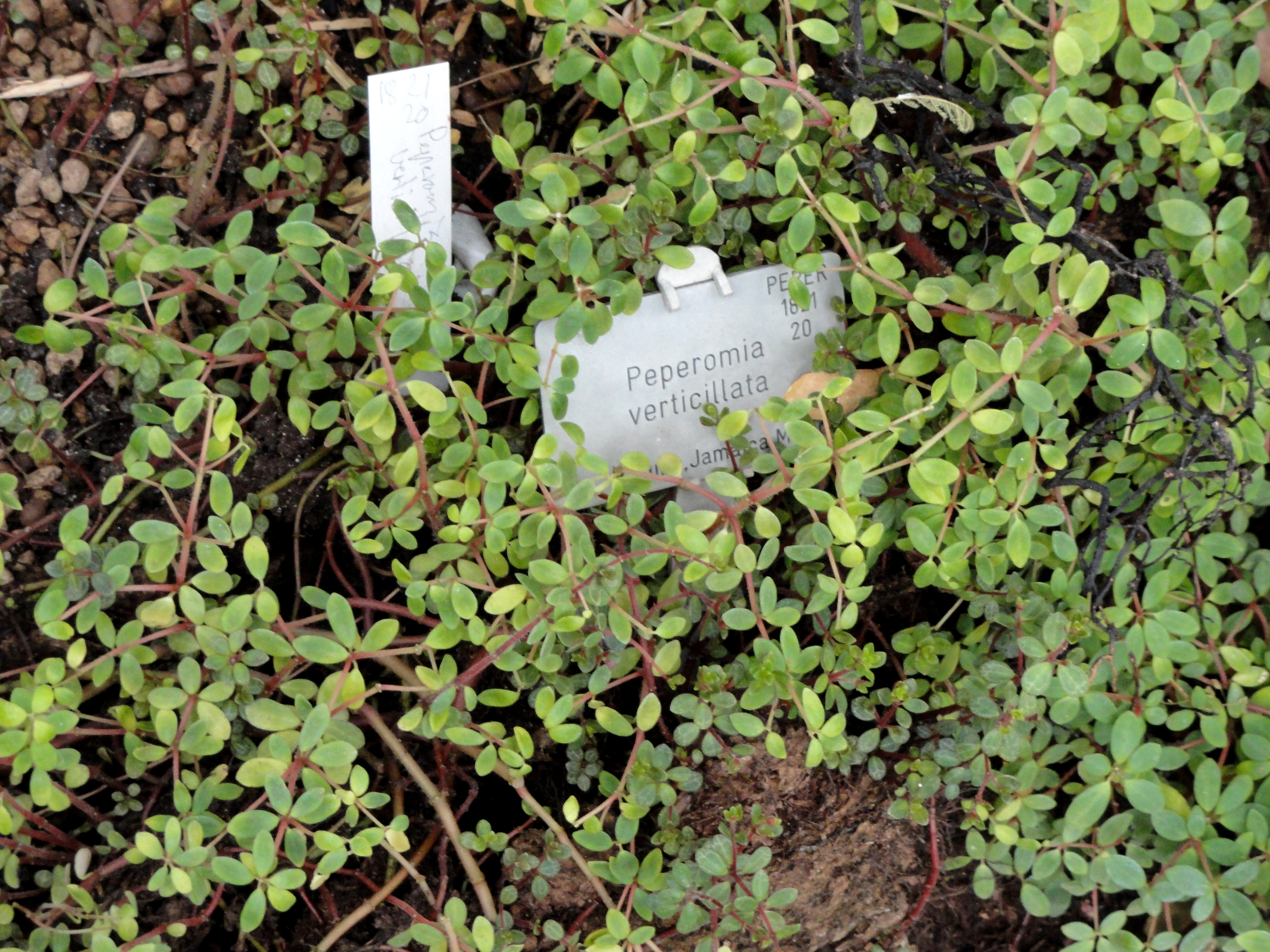

Scientific classification
- Kingdom: Plantae
- Clade: Tracheophytes
- Clade: Angiosperms
- Clade: Magnoliids
- Order: Piperales
- Family: Piperaceae
- Genus: Peperomia
- Species: P. verticillata

Binomial name
- Peperomia verticillata (L.) A.Dietr.

Synonyms
- List: Peperomia fenzlii Regel; Peperomia orbiculata (Poir.) A.Dietr.; Peperomia papulata Trel.; Peperomia roigiana Trel.; Peperomia rubella (Haw. ex Spreng.) Hook.; Peperomia rubella Hook. & Arn. ex C.DC.; Peperomia subpulchella Trel.; Piper orbiculatum Poir.; Piper purpurascens Desf.; Piper rubellum Haw. ex Spreng.; Piper verticillatum L.; Troxirum varians Raf.; Troxirum verticillatum (L.)

= Peperomia verticillata =

Species of plant

Peperomia verticillata is a species of plant in the genus Peperomia of the family Piperaceae. It is native to the Caribbean islands.

== Description ==
Peperomia verticillata is a small, somewhat succulent, perennial shrub growing up to 50 cm long. The leaves, growing in whorls of five along the stems, are rounded, grey-green above and red on the underside. It often grows as an epiphyte.
