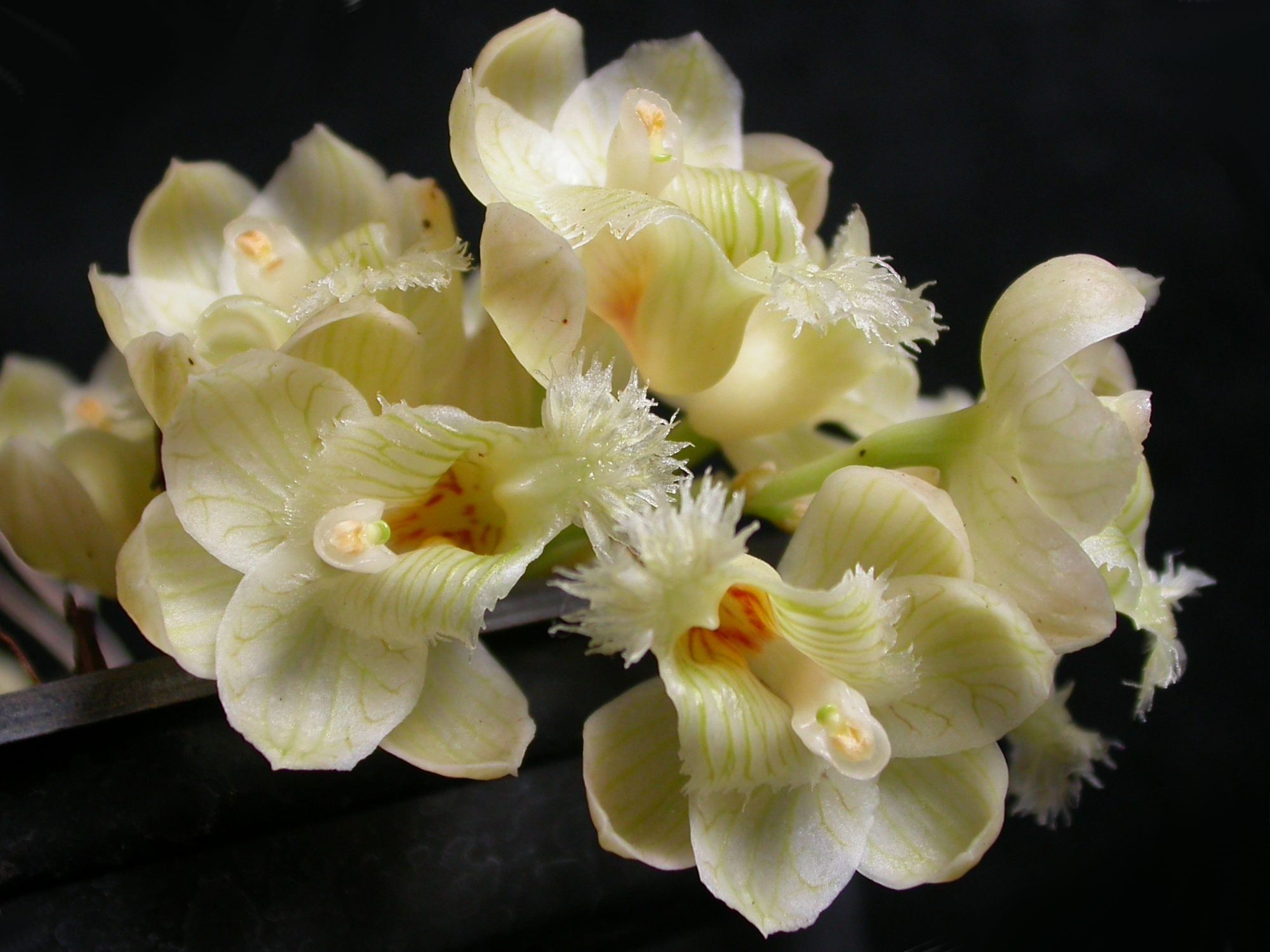
- Clowesia amazonica

Scientific classification
- Kingdom: Plantae
- Clade: Tracheophytes
- Clade: Angiosperms
- Clade: Monocots
- Order: Asparagales
- Family: Orchidaceae
- Subfamily: Epidendroideae
- Tribe: Cymbidieae
- Subtribe: Catasetinae
- Genus: Clowesia; Lindl.

Type species
- Clowesia rosea Lindl.

Synonyms
- Warczewitzia Skinner ex Lindl.

= Clowesia =

Genus of orchids

Clowesia is a genus of the family Orchidaceae. Species of this genus are epiphytic and contain many pseudobulbs with several internodes. The leaves of this plant are arranged alternatively in two vertical rows on opposite sides of the rachis. Clowesia has a simple gullet flower that allows for pollination by male euglossine bees. The flowers are often unisexual and contain a viscidium.

== Species ==
Seven species of this genus are currently recognized, all native to southern Mexico, Central America, and northern South America.

Image	Name	Distribution	Elevation (m)
	Clowesia amazonica K.G.Lacerda & V.P.Castro	Venezuela, Ecuador, northern Brazil	200 - 800 meters
	Clowesia dodsoniana E.Aguirre	Chiapas, Oaxaca	100 - 600 meters
	Clowesia glaucoglossa (Rchb.f.) Dodson	Michoacán	520 - 1200 meters
	Clowesia rosea Lindl.	Michoacán, Guerrero, Oaxaca	
	Clowesia russelliana (Hook.) Dodson	Chiapas, Central America, Venezuela	600 - 1000 meters
	Clowesia thylaciochila (Lem.) Dodson	Chiapas, Oaxaca	600 - 1200 meters
	Clowesia warczewiczii (Lindl. & Paxton) Dodson	Costa Rica, Panama, Venezuela, Guyana, Colombia, Suriname, Ecuador, northern Brazil	70 - 500 meters

== Hybrids ==
Clowesia is in the subtribe Catasetinae, and can be hybridized with the genus Catasetum, giving Clowesetum, and other genera such as Cycnoches and Mormodes.
