= CYC =

CYC or Cyc may refer to:

- Cycle gene, a circadian control gene found in Drosophila melanogaster responsible for the formation of the formation of CYC protein
- Cyc, an American artificial-intelligence project
- Champions Youth Cup, an annual international youth football (soccer) tournament
- China Youth Corps, a Taiwanese youth organization
- Company of Young Canadians, a Canadian youth program
- Cyclorama (theater), a curved fabric or plastic sheet backdrop for a stage
- Cycnoches, a genus of orchid
- Cytochrome c, a protein of the mitochondrial electron transport chain
- Cyclophosphamide, an anti-neoplastic and immunosuppressant drug
