= M. maculata =

M. maculata may refer to:

- Mabuya maculata (Demerara), a Guyanese skink
- Mabuya maculata (Fernando de Noronha), a Brazilian skink
- Macrocallista maculata, a bivalve mollusc
- Macrothele maculata, a mygalomorph spider
- Maculatoscelis maculata, a praying mantis
- Madecassina maculata, a ground beetle
- Mancopsetta maculata, a southern flounder
- Medicago maculata, a plant native to the Mediterranean Basin
- Megascolia maculata, a former name for Regiscolia maculata, a scoliid wasp
- Megilla maculata, a ladybird beetle
- Mahehia maculata, a woodlouse endemic to Seychelles
- Margarita maculata, a sea snail
- Melanoraphia maculata, a ringed worm
- Mene maculata, a disk-shaped fish
- Mesovipera maculata, a venomous viper
- Mitromorpha maculata, a sea snail
- Mormodes maculata, an orchid endemic to Mexico
- Musca maculata, a European fly
- Mycena maculata, a saprotrophic fungus
- Myopopone maculata, a social insect
