= Dormancy =

State of minimized physical activity of an organism

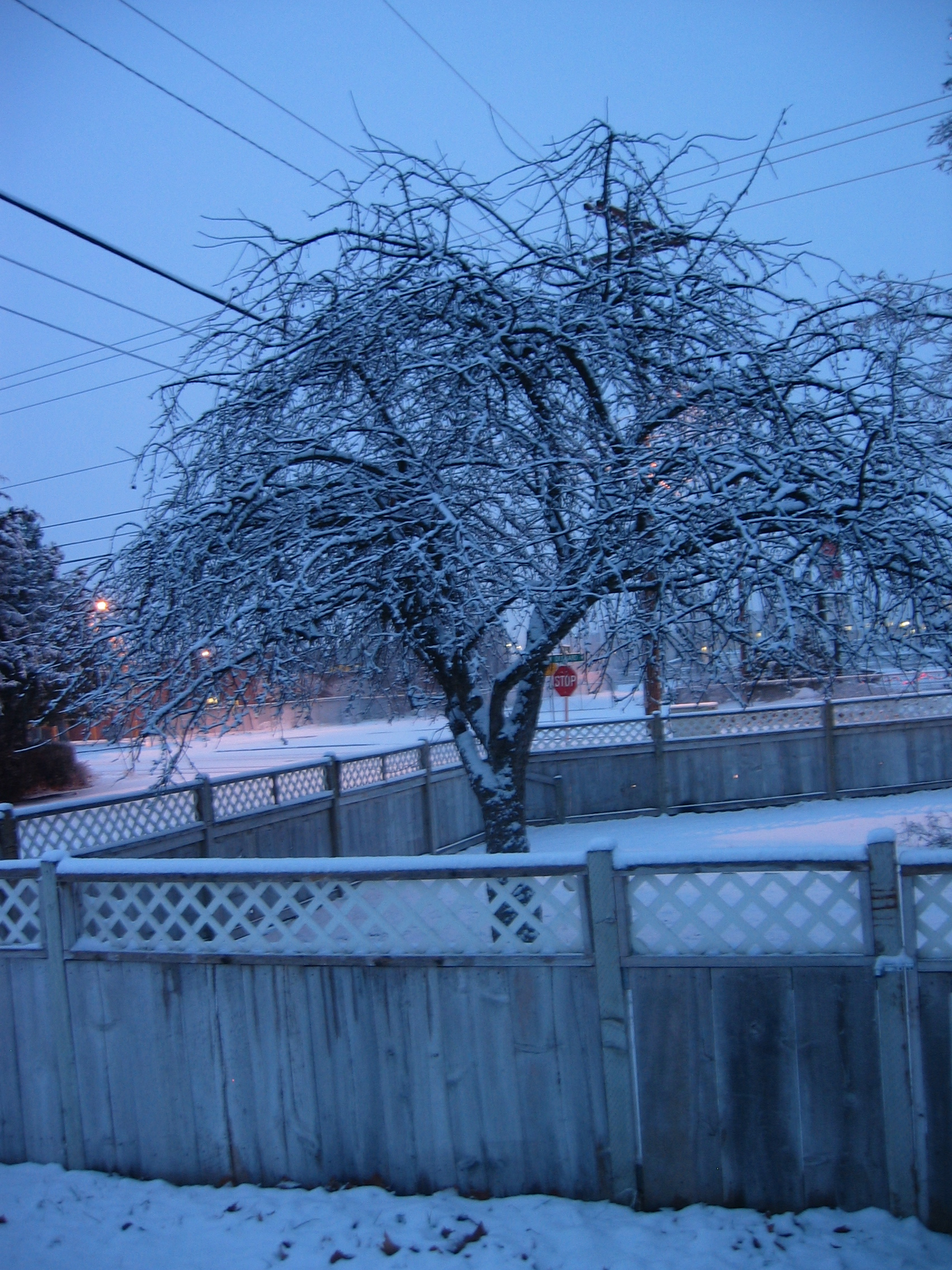
During winter dormancy, plant metabolism comes to a virtual standstill, due in part to low temperatures that slow chemical activity.

Dormancy is a period in an organism's life cycle when growth, development, and (in animals) physical activity are temporarily stopped. This minimizes metabolic activity and therefore helps an organism to conserve energy. Dormancy tends to be closely associated with environmental conditions. Organisms can synchronize entry to a dormant phase with their environment through predictive or consequential means.

Predictive dormancy occurs when an organism enters a dormant phase before the onset of adverse conditions. For example, photoperiod and decreasing temperature are used by many plants to predict the onset of winter.

Consequential dormancy occurs when organisms enter a dormant phase after adverse conditions have arisen. This is commonly found in areas with an unpredictable climate. While very sudden changes in conditions may lead to a high mortality rate among animals relying on consequential dormancy, its use can be advantageous, as organisms remain active longer and are therefore able to make greater use of available resources.

== Animals ==
=== Hibernation ===
Hibernation is a mechanism used by many mammals to reduce energy expenditure and survive food shortages over the winter. Hibernation may be predictive or consequential. An animal prepares for hibernation by building up a thick layer of body fat during late summer and autumn that will provide it with energy during the dormant period. During hibernation, the animal undergoes many physiological changes, including decreased heart rate (by as much as 95%) and decreased body temperature. In addition to shivering, some hibernating animals produce body heat by non-shivering thermogenesis to avoid freezing. Non-shivering thermogenesis is a regulated process in which the proton gradient generated by electron transport in mitochondria is used to produce heat instead of ATP in brown adipose tissue. Animals that hibernate include bats, ground squirrels and other rodents, mouse lemurs, the European hedgehog and other insectivores, monotremes and marsupials. Although hibernation is almost exclusively seen in mammals, some birds, such as the common poorwill, may hibernate.

=== Diapause ===
Diapause is a predictive strategy that is predetermined by an animal's genotype. Diapause is common in insects, allowing them to suspend development between autumn and spring, and in mammals such as the roe deer (Capreolus capreolus, the only ungulate with embryonic diapause), in which a delay in attachment of the embryo to the uterine lining ensures that offspring are born in spring, when conditions are most favorable.

=== Aestivation ===
Aestivation, also spelled estivation, is a type of consequential dormancy in a dry season, typically a summer, in response to shortage of food or water. That often but not necessarily means that the triggering season is hot.

The behaviour is ancient, as aestivation burrows (trace fossils) of lungfish have been found in rocks of Devonian to Cretaceous age, while amphibian (lysorophid) burrows are known from the Permian.

Aestivation has a wide taxonomic range. Among the arthropods are beetles such as ladybirds; flies such as mosquitoes; lepidopterans such as bogong moths; and crustaceans including the inland freshwater crab Austrothelphusa transversa. Among vertebrates, aestivation is most common among reptiles and amphibians. Among aestivating reptiles are the desert tortoise and the spotted turtle, while amphibians with the behaviour include the California tiger salamander and the California red-legged frog. Modern lungfish like the African lungfish aestivate just as their ancestors did.

=== Brumation ===
While endotherms and other heterotherms are described scientifically as hibernating, the way ectotherms such as lizards become dormant in cold conditions is very different, and a separate term was coined for it in the 1920s: brumation. It differs from hibernation in the metabolic processes involved: energy is stored in glycogen in addition to or in place of fats, and periodic water intake is required.

== Plants ==
In plant physiology, dormancy is a period of arrested plant growth. It is a survival strategy exhibited by many plant species, which enables them to survive in harsh conditions and climates where part of the year is unsuitable for growth, such as winter or dry seasons.

Many plant species that exhibit dormancy have a biological clock that tells them when to slow activity and to prepare soft tissues for a period of freezing temperatures or water shortage. On the other hand, dormancy can be triggered after a normal growing season by decreasing temperatures, shortened day length, and/or a reduction in rainfall. Chemical treatment on dormant plants has been proven to be an effective method to break dormancy, particularly in woody plants such as grapes, berries, apples, peaches, and kiwis. Specifically, hydrogen cyanamide stimulates cell division and growth in dormant plants, causing buds to break when the plant is on the edge of breaking dormancy. Slight injury of cells may play a role in the mechanism of action. The injury is thought to result in increased permeability of cellular membranes. The injury is associated with the inhibition of catalase, which in turn stimulates the pentose phosphate cycle. Hydrogen cyanamide interacts with the cytokinin metabolic cycle, which results in triggering a new growth cycle. The two adjacent images show two particularly widespread dormancy patterns amongst sympodially growing orchids:

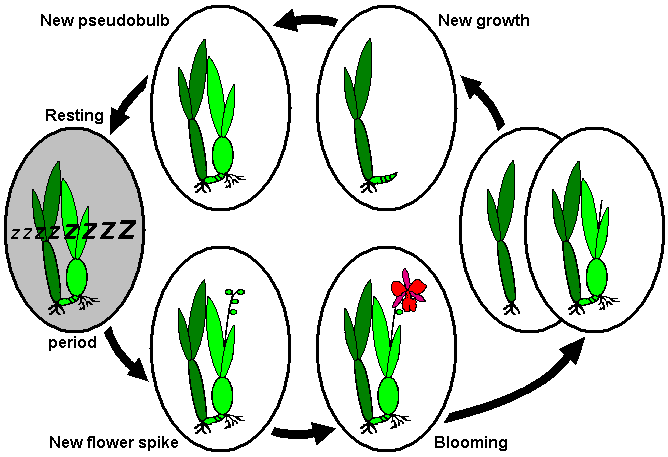
Annual life cycle of sympodially growing orchids with dormancy after completing new growth/pseudobulb, e.g., Miltonia, or Odontoglossum

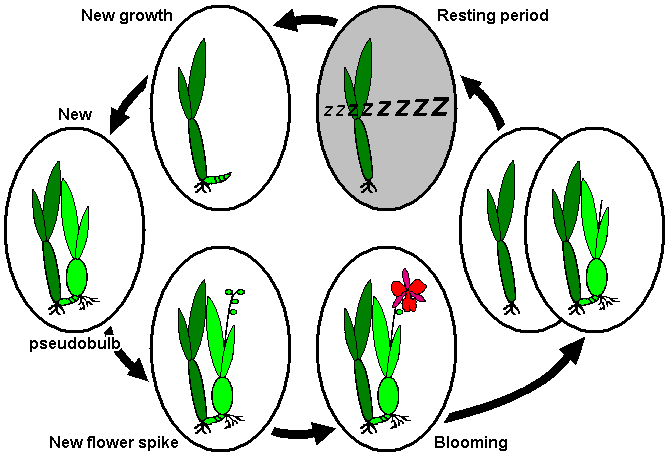
Annual life cycle of sympodially growing orchids with dormancy after blooming, e.g., Cycnoches ventricosum, Dendrobium nobile, or Laelia

=== Seeds ===
When a mature and viable seed under a favorable condition fails to germinate, it is said to be dormant. Seed dormancy is variously called embryo dormancy or internal dormancy and is caused by endogenous characteristics of the embryo that prevent germination. Dormancy should not be confused with seed coat dormancy, external dormancy, or hardheadedness, which is caused by the presence of a hard seed covering or seed coat that prevents water and oxygen from reaching and activating the embryo. It is a physical barrier to germination, not a true form of dormancy.

Seed dormancy is desired in nature, but it is undesirable in agriculture. This is because agricultural practice desires rapid germination and growth for food, whereas in nature most plants can only germinate once every year, making it favorable for plants to pick a specific time to reproduce. For many plants, it is preferable to reproduce in spring as opposed to autumn, even when there are similar conditions in terms of light and temperature, since winter soon follows. Many plants and seeds therefore enter dormancy in the autumn. The grain is a popular example in this aspect, where they would die above ground during the winter, so dormancy is favorable to its seedlings but extensive domestication and crossbreeding has removed most of the dormancy mechanisms that their ancestors had.

While seed dormancy is linked to many genes, abscisic acid (ABA), a plant hormone, is a major influence on seed dormancy. In a study on rice and tobacco plants, those defective in zeaxanthin epoxidase gene are linked to the ABA-synthesis pathway. Seeds with higher ABA content, caused by over-expressing zeaxanthin epoxidase, had an increased dormancy period while plants with lower zeaxanthin epoxidase had a shorter period of dormancy. Thus, ABA inhibits seed germination, while gibberellin (GA, also a plant hormone) inhibits ABA production and promotes seed germination.

=== Trees ===
Typically, temperate woody perennial plants require chilling temperatures to overcome winter dormancy (rest). The effect of chilling temperatures depends on species and growth stage. In some species, rest can be broken within hours at any stage of dormancy, with either chemicals, heat, or freezing temperatures, effective dosages of which would seem to be a function of sublethal stress, which results in stimulation of ethylene production and increased cell membrane permeability.

Dormancy occurs in conifers such as the white spruce, Picea glauca. White spruce, like many woody plants in temperate and cooler regions, requires exposure to low temperature for a period of weeks before it can resume normal growth and development. This "chilling requirement" is satisfied for white spruce by uninterrupted exposure to temperatures below 7 °C for 4 to 8 weeks, depending on physiological condition. Buds and leaves may start to develop before tree shoots begin to elongate or flushes of new leaves appear. Buds that appear to be dormant can thus be very active morphologically and physiologically.

Dormancy in spruce trees is induced by short photoperiods; this permits the formation of needle primordia, which takes 8 to 10 weeks and must be followed by 6 weeks of chilling at 2 °C. Bud break occurs promptly if seedlings are then exposed to 16-hour photoperiods at the 25°C/20°C temperature regime. The free growth mode, a juvenile characteristic that is lost after 5 years or so, ceases in seedlings experiencing environmental stress.

== Bacteria ==
Many bacteria can survive adverse conditions such as temperature, desiccation, and antibiotics by forming endospores, cysts, or general states of reduced metabolic activity lacking specialized cellular structures. Up to 80% of the bacteria in samples from the wild appear to be metabolically inactive—many of which can be resuscitated.

Such dormancy is responsible for the high diversity levels of most natural ecosystems.

Bacteria enter a state of reduced metabolic activity not only during stress, but also when a bacterial population has reached a stable state. Many bacteria are capable of producing proteins called hibernation factors which can bind to and inactivate their ribosomes, pausing protein production, which can take more than 50% of a cell's energy usage.

A 2014 study has characterized the bacterial cytoplasm as a glass forming fluid approaching the liquid-glass transition, such that large cytoplasmic components require the aid of metabolic activity to fluidize the surrounding cytoplasm, allowing them to move through a viscous, glass-like cytoplasm. During dormancy, when such metabolic activities are put on hold, the cytoplasm behaves like a solid glass, 'freezing' subcellular structures in place and perhaps protecting them, while allowing small molecules like metabolites to move freely through the cell, which may be helpful in cells transitioning out of dormancy.

== Viruses ==
Dormancy, in its rigid definition, does not apply to viruses, as they are not metabolically active. However, some viruses such as poxviruses and picornaviruses, after entering the host, can become latent for long periods of time, or even indefinitely until they are externally activated. Herpesviruses, for example, can become latent after infecting the host, and after years they can activate again if the host is under stress or exposed to ultraviolet radiation.

== See also ==
- Bet hedging (biology)
- Plant physiology
- Scotobiology
- Torpor
