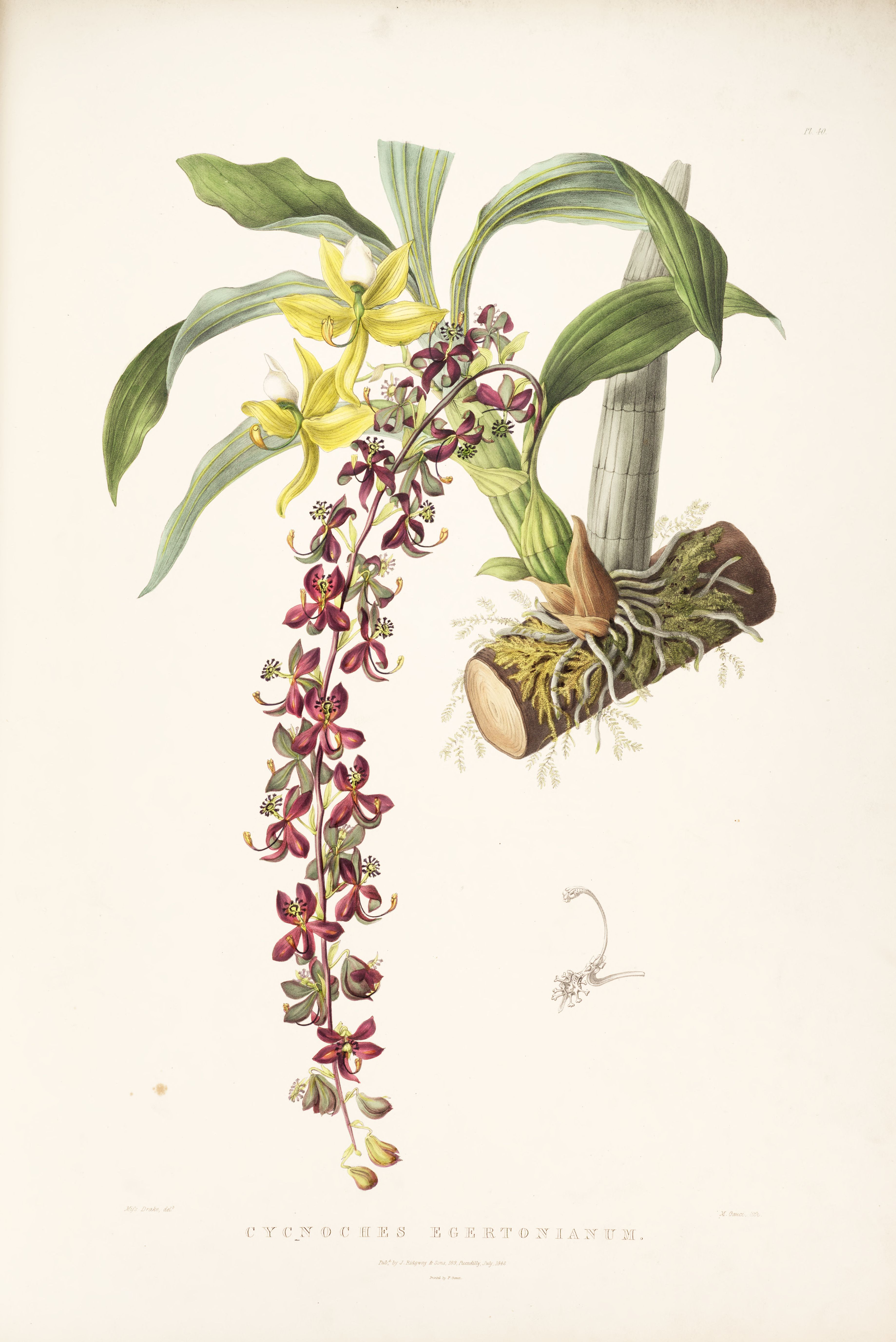
- 1842 illustration from Bateman's "The Orchidaceae of Mexico and Guatemala"

Scientific classification
- Kingdom: Plantae
- Clade: Tracheophytes
- Clade: Angiosperms
- Clade: Monocots
- Order: Asparagales
- Family: Orchidaceae
- Subfamily: Epidendroideae
- Tribe: Cymbidieae
- Subtribe: Catasetinae
- Genus: Cycnoches
- Species: C. egertonianum

Binomial name
- Cycnoches egertonianum Bateman

Synonyms
- Cycnoches ventricosum var. egertonianum (Bateman) Hook.

= Cycnoches egertonianum =

Species of orchid

Cycnoches egertonianum is a species of orchid native to Mexico, Belize and Central America.

== Varieties ==
As of December 2023, Plants of the World Online accepted two varieties:

- Cycnoches egertonianum var. egertonianum
- Cycnoches egertonianum var. viride Lindl., syn. Cycnoches stelliferum Lodd., nom. nud.
