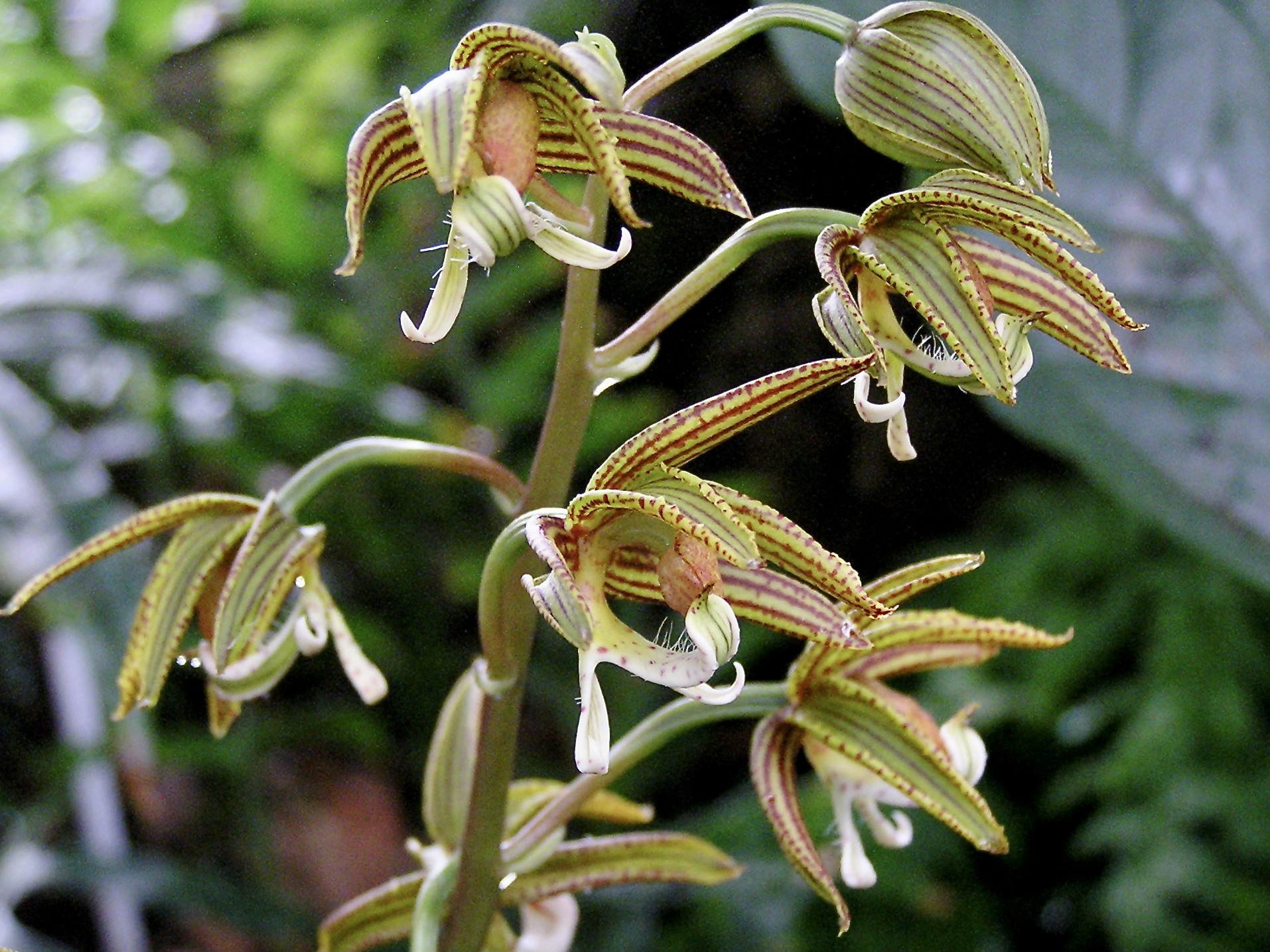
- 1842 illustration

Scientific classification
- Kingdom: Plantae
- Clade: Tracheophytes
- Clade: Angiosperms
- Clade: Monocots
- Order: Asparagales
- Family: Orchidaceae
- Subfamily: Epidendroideae
- Genus: Mormodes
- Species: M. lineata

Binomial name
- Mormodes lineata Bateman ex Lindl.

Synonyms
- Mormodes histrio Linden & Rchb.f.; Catasetum trimerochilum Lem.

= Mormodes lineata =

Species of orchid

Mormodes lineata is a species of orchid occurring from Oaxaca south to Honduras.
