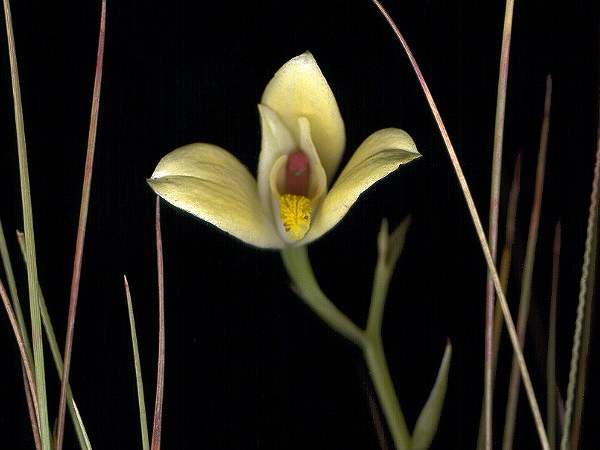
- Cyanaeorchis arundinae

Scientific classification
- Kingdom: Plantae
- Clade: Tracheophytes
- Clade: Angiosperms
- Clade: Monocots
- Order: Asparagales
- Family: Orchidaceae
- Subfamily: Epidendroideae
- Tribe: Cymbidieae
- Subtribe: Catasetinae
- Genus: Cyanaeorchis; Barb.Rodr.

= Cyanaeorchis =

Genus of orchids

Cyanaeorchis is a genus of flowering plants from the orchid family, Orchidaceae. It contains three known species, all of which are endemic to South America.

- Cyanaeorchis arundinae (Rchb.f.) Barb.Rodr. - N. Brazil, Argentina, Paraguay
- Cyanaeorchis minor Schltr. - Brazil
- Cyanaeorchis praetermissa J.A.N.Bat. & Bianch. - Brazil

== See also ==
- List of Orchidaceae genera
