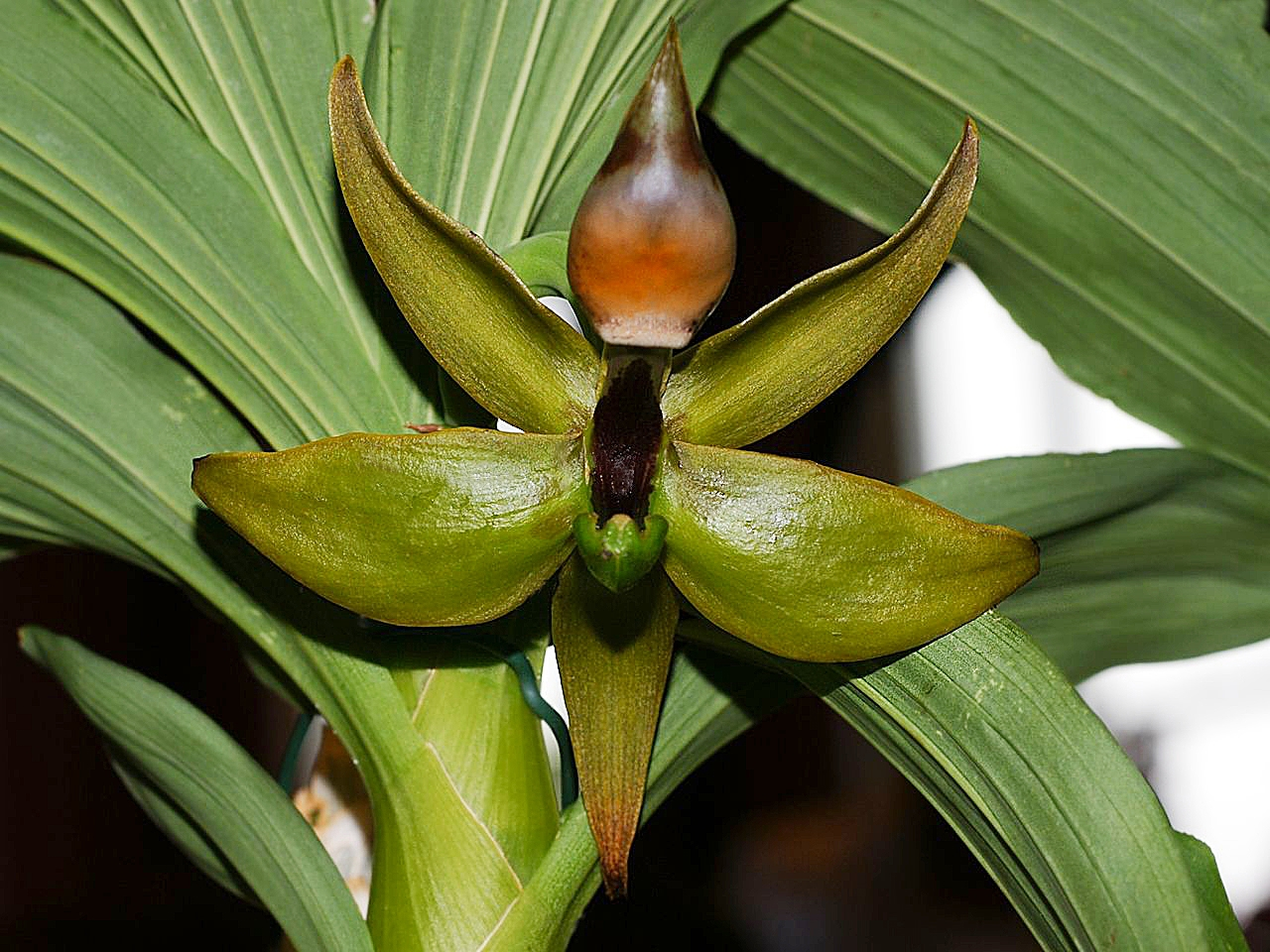

Scientific classification
- Kingdom: Plantae
- Clade: Tracheophytes
- Clade: Angiosperms
- Clade: Monocots
- Order: Asparagales
- Family: Orchidaceae
- Subfamily: Epidendroideae
- Genus: Cycnoches
- Species: C. loddigesii

Binomial name
- Cycnoches loddigesii Lindl. (1832)

Synonyms
- Cycnoches cucullatum Lindl. (1837); Cycnoches loddigesii var. leucochilum Hook. (1841)

= Cycnoches loddigesii =

Species of orchid

Cycnoches loddigesii is a species of orchid. It is the type species of the genus Cycnoches.
