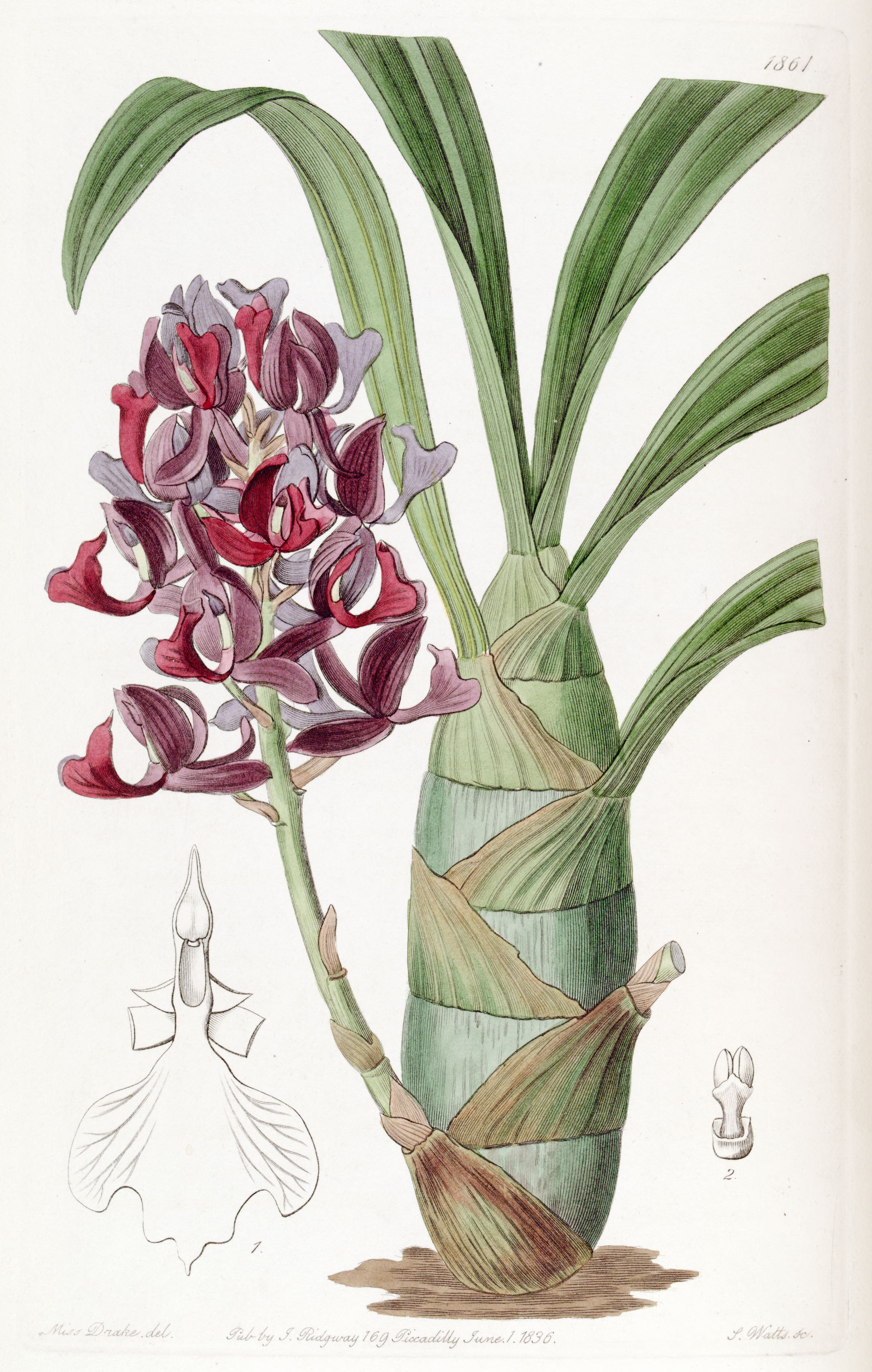
- 1836 illustration

Scientific classification
- Kingdom: Plantae
- Clade: Tracheophytes
- Clade: Angiosperms
- Clade: Monocots
- Order: Asparagales
- Family: Orchidaceae
- Subfamily: Epidendroideae
- Genus: Mormodes
- Species: M. atropurpurea

Binomial name
- Mormodes atropurpurea Lindl.

= Mormodes atropurpurea =

Species of orchid

Mormodes atropurpurea is a species of orchid native to Panama, Venezuela, and Brazil.
