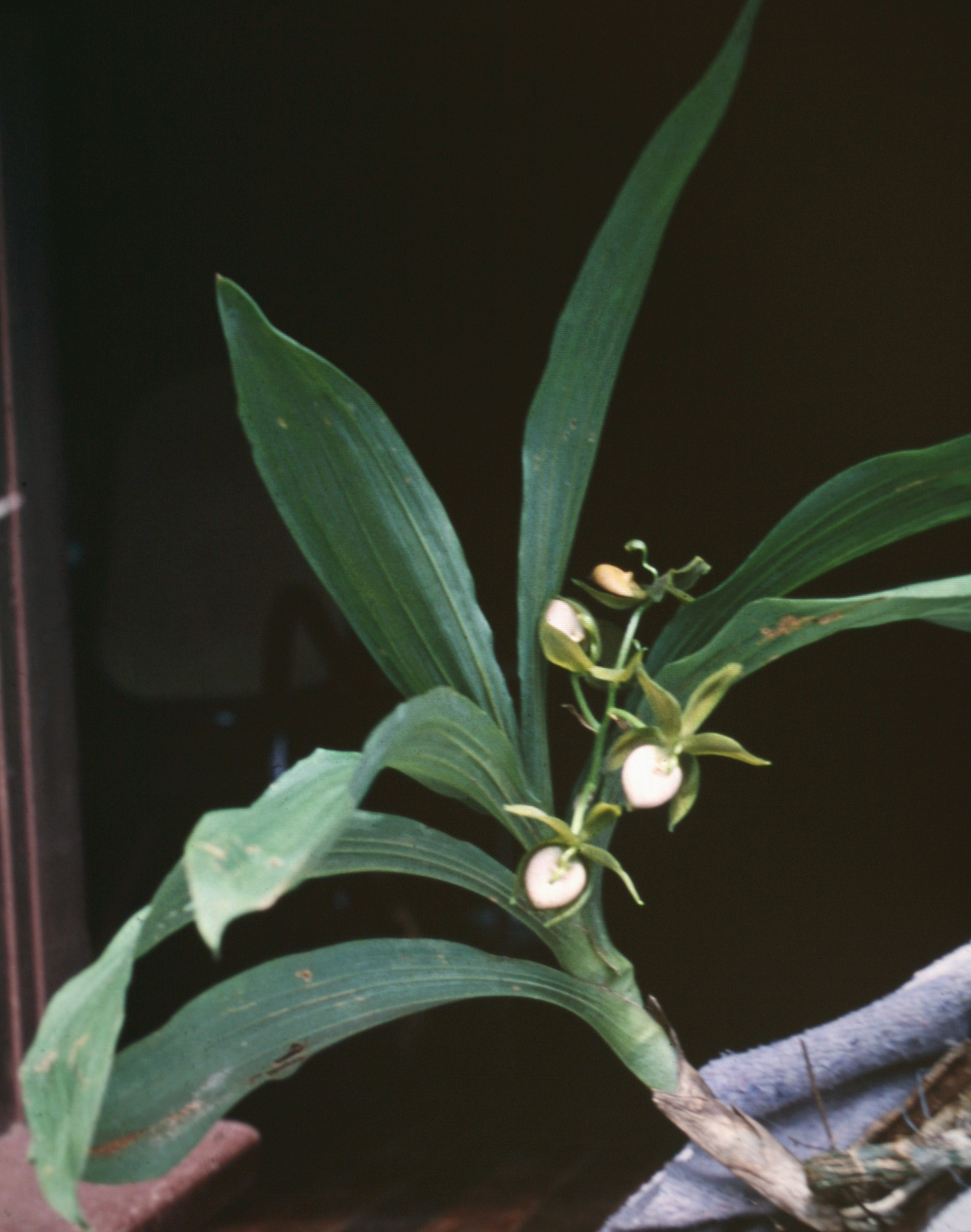

Scientific classification
- Kingdom: Plantae
- Clade: Tracheophytes
- Clade: Angiosperms
- Clade: Monocots
- Order: Asparagales
- Family: Orchidaceae
- Subfamily: Epidendroideae
- Genus: Cycnoches
- Species: C. haagii

Binomial name
- Cycnoches haagii Barb.Rodr. (1881)

Synonyms
- Cycnoches versicolor Rchb.f. (1888)

= Cycnoches haagii =

Species of orchid

Cycnoches haagii is a species of orchid native to tropical South America.

Media related to Cycnoches haagii at Wikimedia Commons
