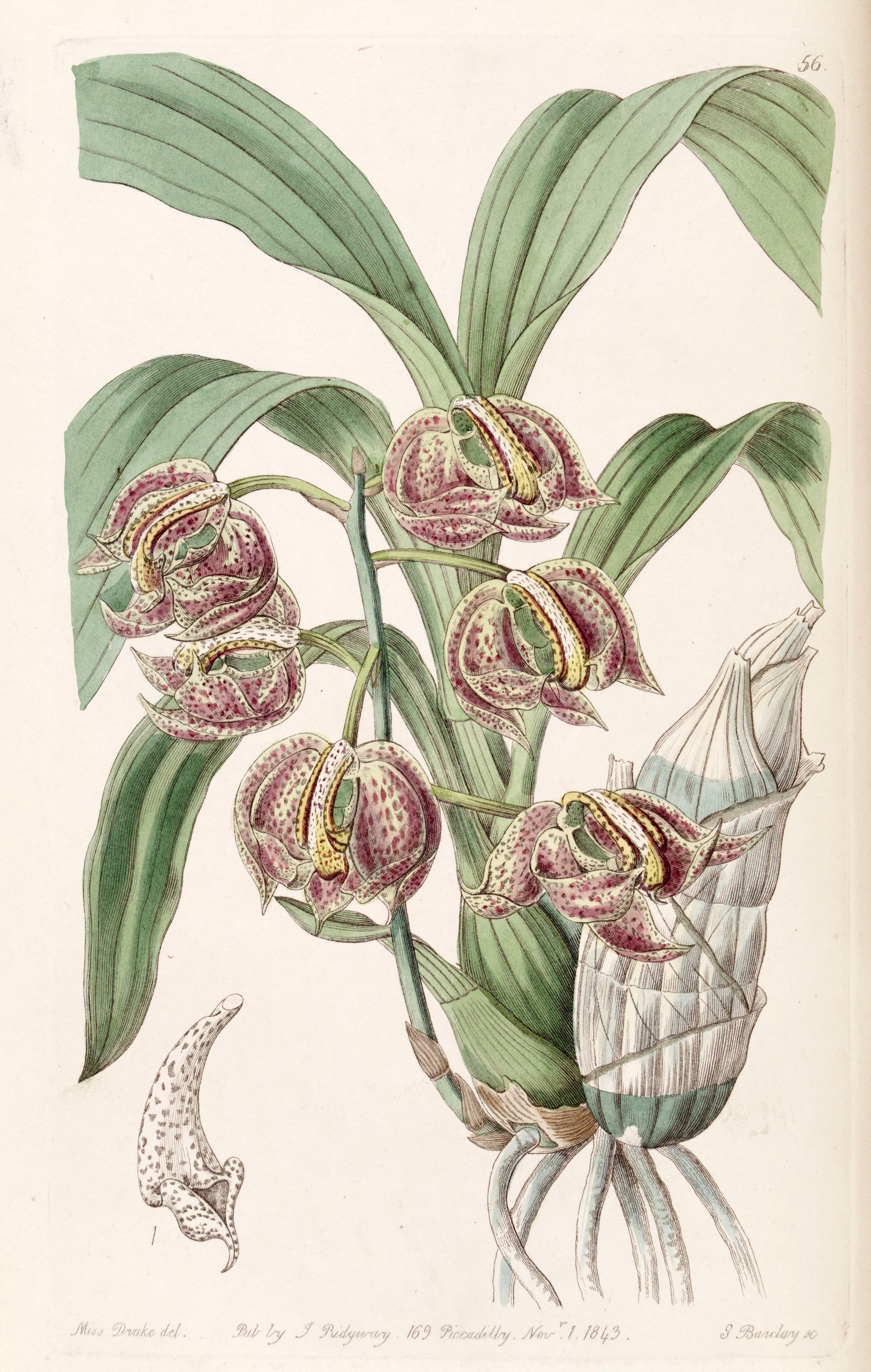
- 1843 illustration

Scientific classification
- Kingdom: Plantae
- Clade: Tracheophytes
- Clade: Angiosperms
- Clade: Monocots
- Order: Asparagales
- Family: Orchidaceae
- Subfamily: Epidendroideae
- Genus: Mormodes
- Species: M. aromatica

Binomial name
- Mormodes aromatica Lindl.

= Mormodes aromatica =

Species of orchid

Mormodes aromatica is a species of orchid occurring from Mexico (Guerrero, Oaxaca, Chiapas) to Honduras.
