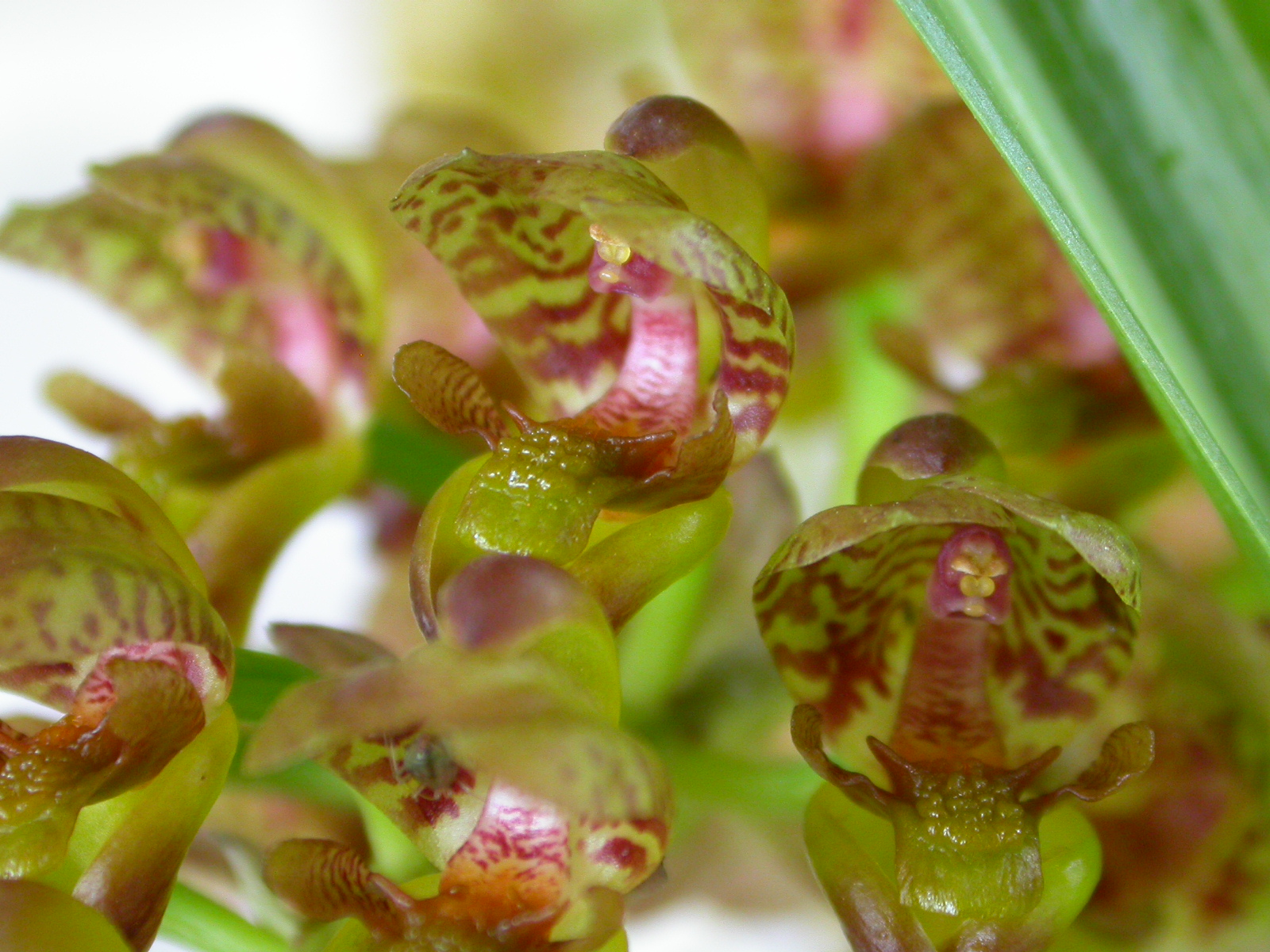
- Grobya fascifera

Scientific classification
- Kingdom: Plantae
- Clade: Tracheophytes
- Clade: Angiosperms
- Clade: Monocots
- Order: Asparagales
- Family: Orchidaceae
- Subfamily: Epidendroideae
- Tribe: Cymbidieae
- Subtribe: Catasetinae
- Genus: Grobya; Lindl.

Type species
- Grobya amherstiae Lindl.

= Grobya =

Genus of orchids

Grobya is a genus of flowering plants from the orchid family, Orchidaceae. It contains 5 known species, all endemic to Brazil.

1. Grobya amherstiae Lindl.
2. Grobya cipoensis F.Barros & Lourenço
3. Grobya fascifera Rchb.f.
4. Grobya galeata Lindl.
5. Grobya guieselii F.Barros & Lourenço

== See also ==
- List of Orchidaceae genera
