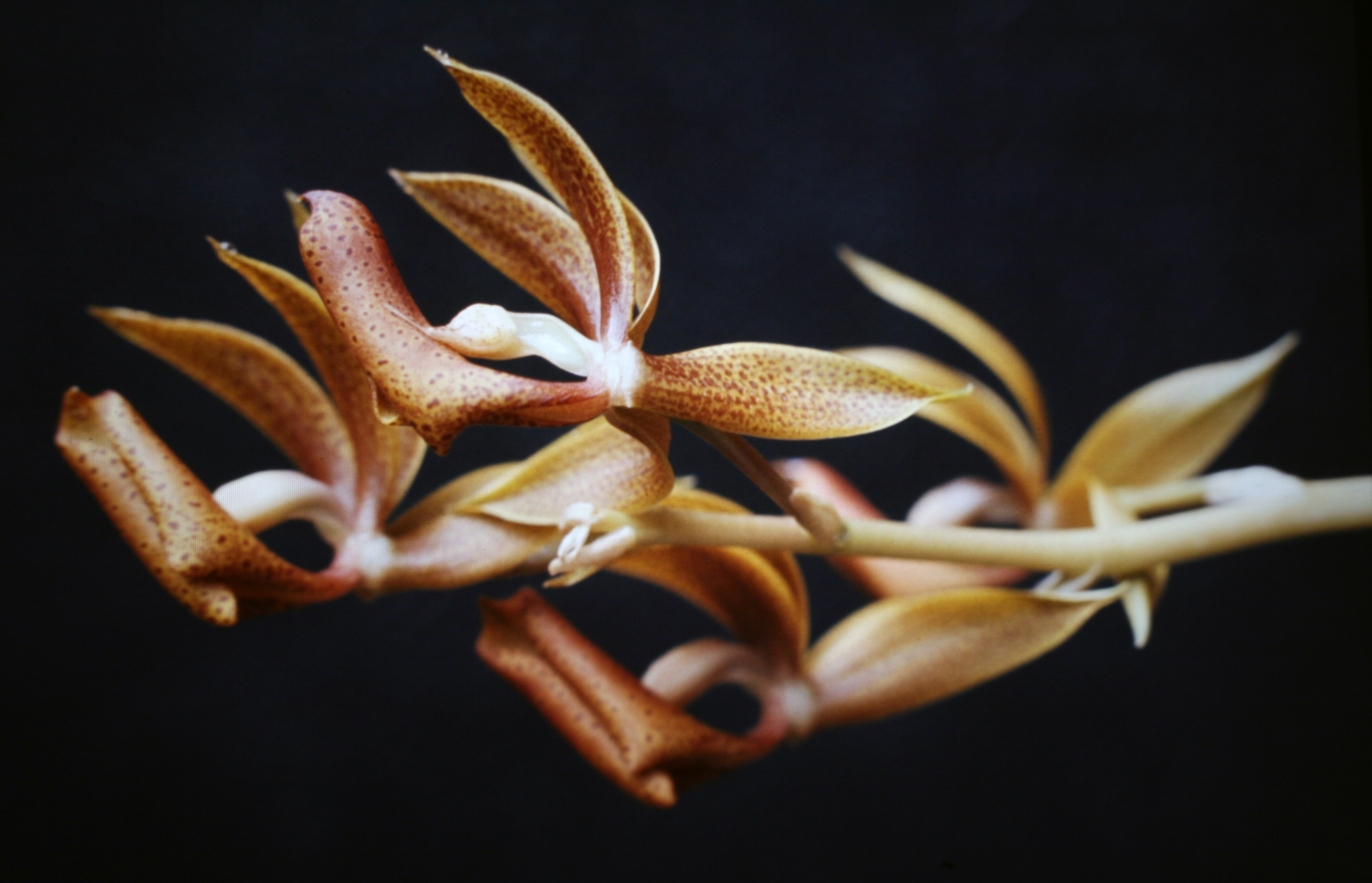

Scientific classification
- Kingdom: Plantae
- Clade: Tracheophytes
- Clade: Angiosperms
- Clade: Monocots
- Order: Asparagales
- Family: Orchidaceae
- Subfamily: Epidendroideae
- Genus: Mormodes
- Species: M. buccinator

Binomial name
- Mormodes buccinator Lindl.

Synonyms
- Mormodes amazonica Brade; Mormodes brachystachya Klotzsch; Mormodes buccinator var. aurantiacum Rolfe; Mormodes buccinator var. major Rchb.f.; Mormodes buccinator var. theiochlora Rchb.f.; Mormodes flavida Klotzsch; Mormodes lentiginosa Hook.; Mormodes leucochila Klotzsch; Mormodes marmorea Klotzsch; Mormodes stenoglossa Schltr.; Mormodes theiochlora (Rchb.f.) Salazar; Mormodes vitellina Klotzsch; Mormodes wageneriana Klotzsch

= Mormodes buccinator =

Species of orchid

Mormodes buccinator is a species of orchid occurring from Chiapas to Brazil.
