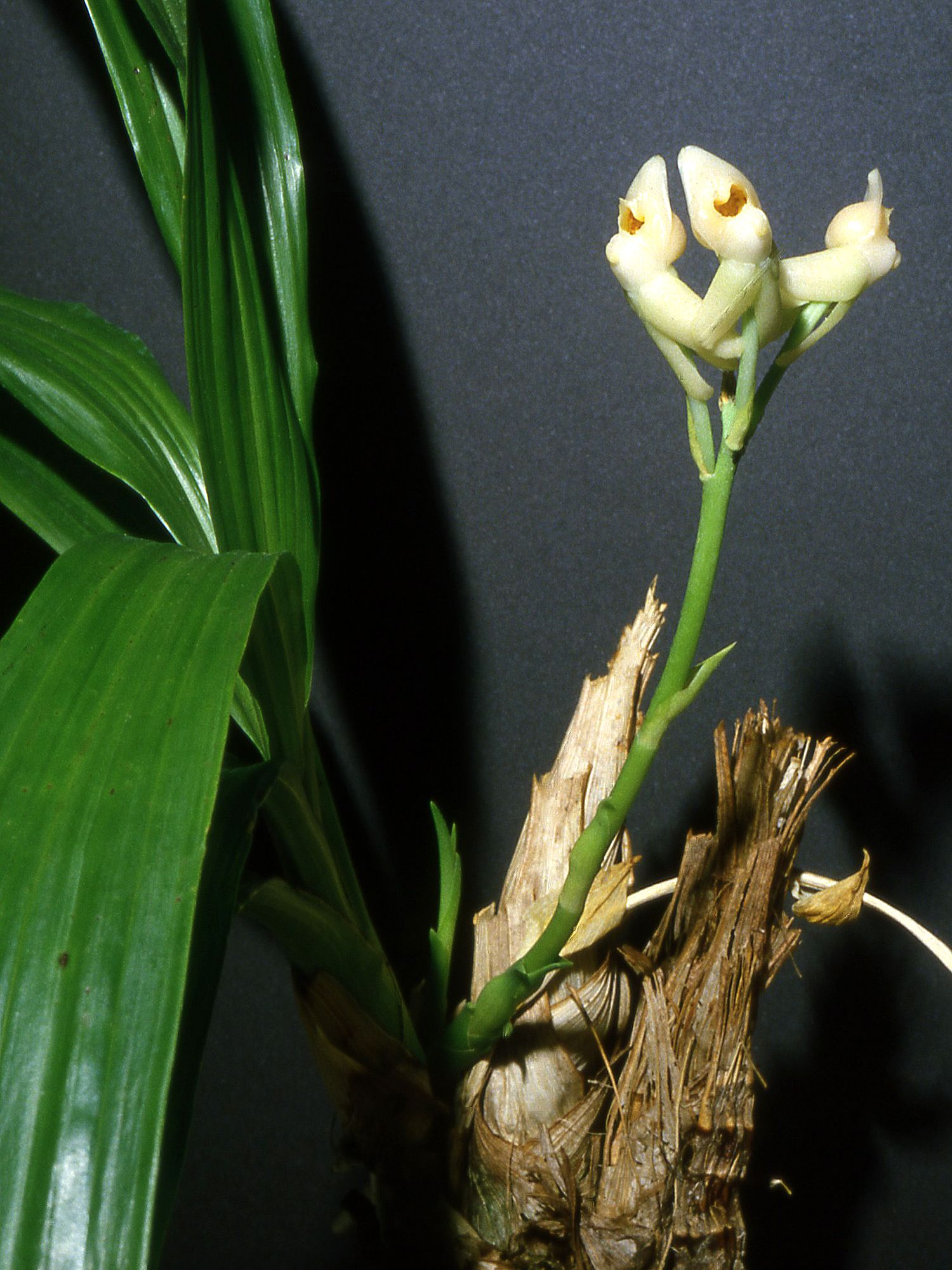
- Dressleria dilecta

Scientific classification
- Kingdom: Plantae
- Clade: Tracheophytes
- Clade: Angiosperms
- Clade: Monocots
- Order: Asparagales
- Family: Orchidaceae
- Subfamily: Epidendroideae
- Tribe: Cymbidieae
- Subtribe: Catasetinae
- Genus: Dressleria; Dodson

= Dressleria =

Genus of orchids

Dressleria is a genus of flowering plants from the orchid family, Orchidaceae native to South and Central America.

== Species ==
Species include:

- Dressleria allenii
- Dressleria aurorae
- Dressleria bennettii
- Dressleria dilecta
- Dressleria dodsoniana
- Dressleria eburnea
- Dressleria fragrans
- Dressleria helleri
- Dressleria kalbreyeri
- Dressleria kerryae
- Dressleria morenoi
- Dressleria severiniana
- Dressleria williamsiana

== See also ==
- List of Orchidaceae genera
