= Clowesia dodsoniana =

Scientific classification
- Kingdom: Plantae
- Clade: Tracheophytes
- Clade: Angiosperms
- Clade: Monocots
- Order: Asparagales
- Family: Orchidaceae
- Subfamily: Epidendroideae
- Genus: Clowesia
- Species: C. dodsoniana

Binomial name
- Clowesia dodsoniana E.Aguirre

Species of orchid

Clowesia dodsoniana is an orchid of the genus Clowesia, found in the Mexican state of Michoacán. It lives at an altitude of 100 metres. It thrives in hot weather. It is pollinated by orchid bees.
