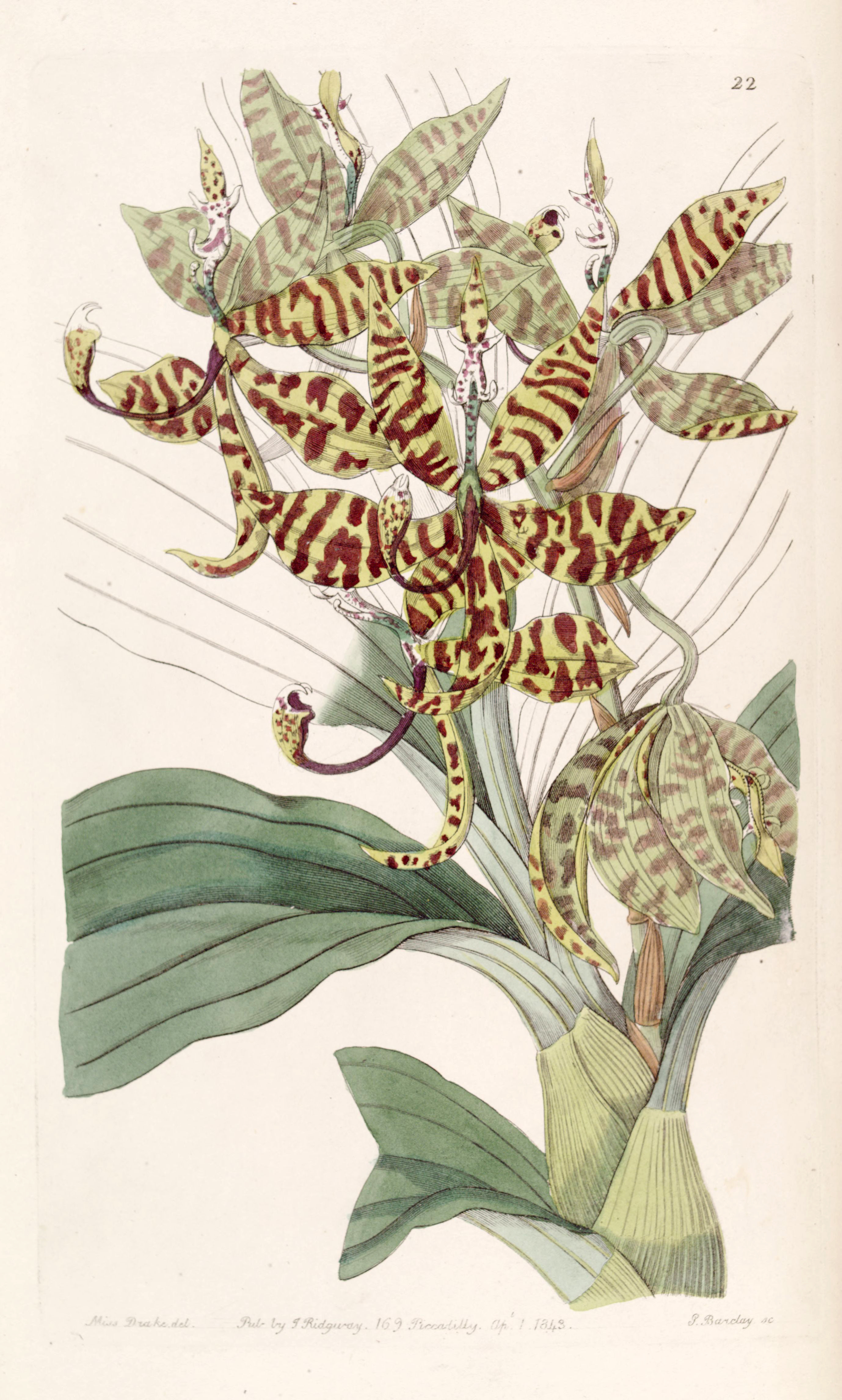
- 1843 illustration from Edwards's Botanical Register

Scientific classification
- Kingdom: Plantae
- Clade: Embryophytes
- Clade: Tracheophytes
- Clade: Spermatophytes
- Clade: Angiosperms
- Clade: Monocots
- Order: Asparagales
- Family: Orchidaceae
- Subfamily: Epidendroideae
- Genus: Cycnoches
- Species: C. pentadactylon

Binomial name
- Cycnoches pentadactylon Lindl. (1843)

Synonyms
- Cycnoches amesianum J.Saunders (1902); Cycnoches espiritosantense Brade (1942)

= Cycnoches pentadactylon =

Species of plant

Cycnoches pentadactylon is a species of swan orchid native to Peru and Brazil.
