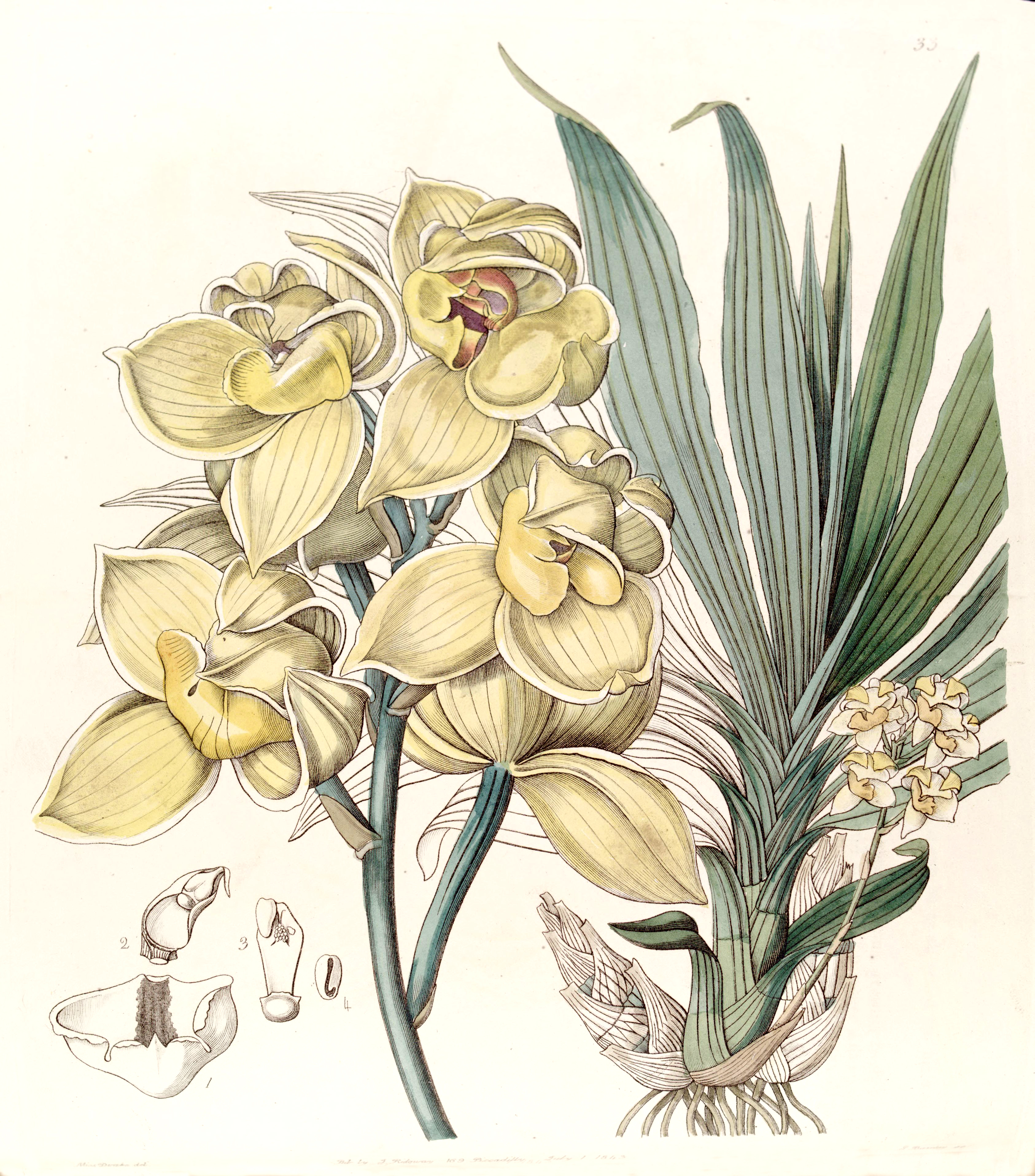
- 1843 illustration

Scientific classification
- Kingdom: Plantae
- Clade: Tracheophytes
- Clade: Angiosperms
- Clade: Monocots
- Order: Asparagales
- Family: Orchidaceae
- Subfamily: Epidendroideae
- Genus: Mormodes
- Species: M. luxata

Binomial name
- Mormodes luxata Lindl.

Synonyms
- Mormodes williamsii G.Nicholson

= Mormodes luxata =

Species of orchid

Mormodes luxata is a species of orchid endemic to southwestern Mexico.
