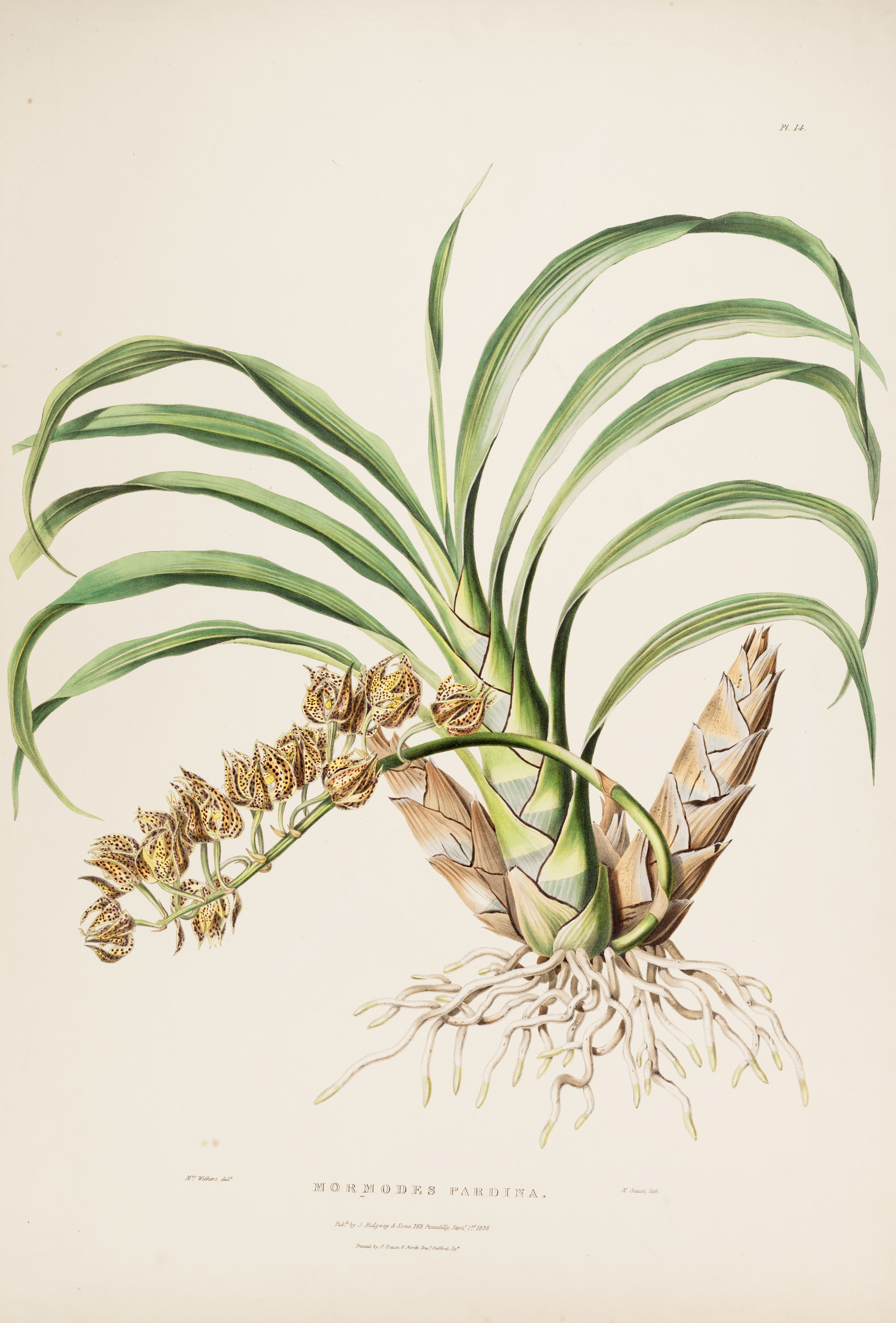
- 1842 illustration

Scientific classification
- Kingdom: Plantae
- Clade: Tracheophytes
- Clade: Angiosperms
- Clade: Monocots
- Order: Asparagales
- Family: Orchidaceae
- Subfamily: Epidendroideae
- Genus: Mormodes
- Species: M. maculata

Binomial name
- Mormodes maculata (Klotzsch) L.O.Williams

Synonyms
- Cyclosia maculata Klotzsch (basionym)

= Mormodes maculata =

Species of orchid

Mormodes maculata is a species of orchid endemic to central and southern Mexico.
