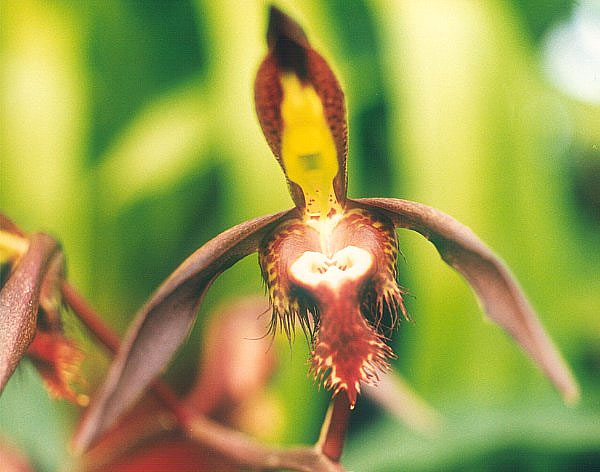
- Catasetum saccatum

Scientific classification
- Kingdom: Plantae
- Clade: Tracheophytes
- Clade: Angiosperms
- Clade: Monocots
- Order: Asparagales
- Family: Orchidaceae
- Subfamily: Epidendroideae
- Tribe: Cymbidieae
- Subtribe: Catasetinae

Genera
- See text.

= Catasetinae =

Subtribe of orchids

Catasetinae is a subtribe within the Orchidaceae and contains 8 genera. Its members are widespread in lowland tropical Central and South America up to 1,500 meters. They are found on trees, stumps or old fence posts.

Catasetinae are exclusively pollinated by male euglossine bees, which are attracted to the floral fragrances, and collect them. A particular Catasetinae species may attract only one or a few species of bees from the dozens that occur in the habitat.

== Genera ==
- Catasetum (200 species)
- Clowesia (7 species)
- Cyanaeorchis (3 species)
- Cycnoches (33 species)
- Dressleria (13 species)
- Galeandra (37 species)
- Grobya (5 species)
- Mormodes (76 species)

The related genus Cyrtopodium is separated as subtribe Cyrtopodiinae.
