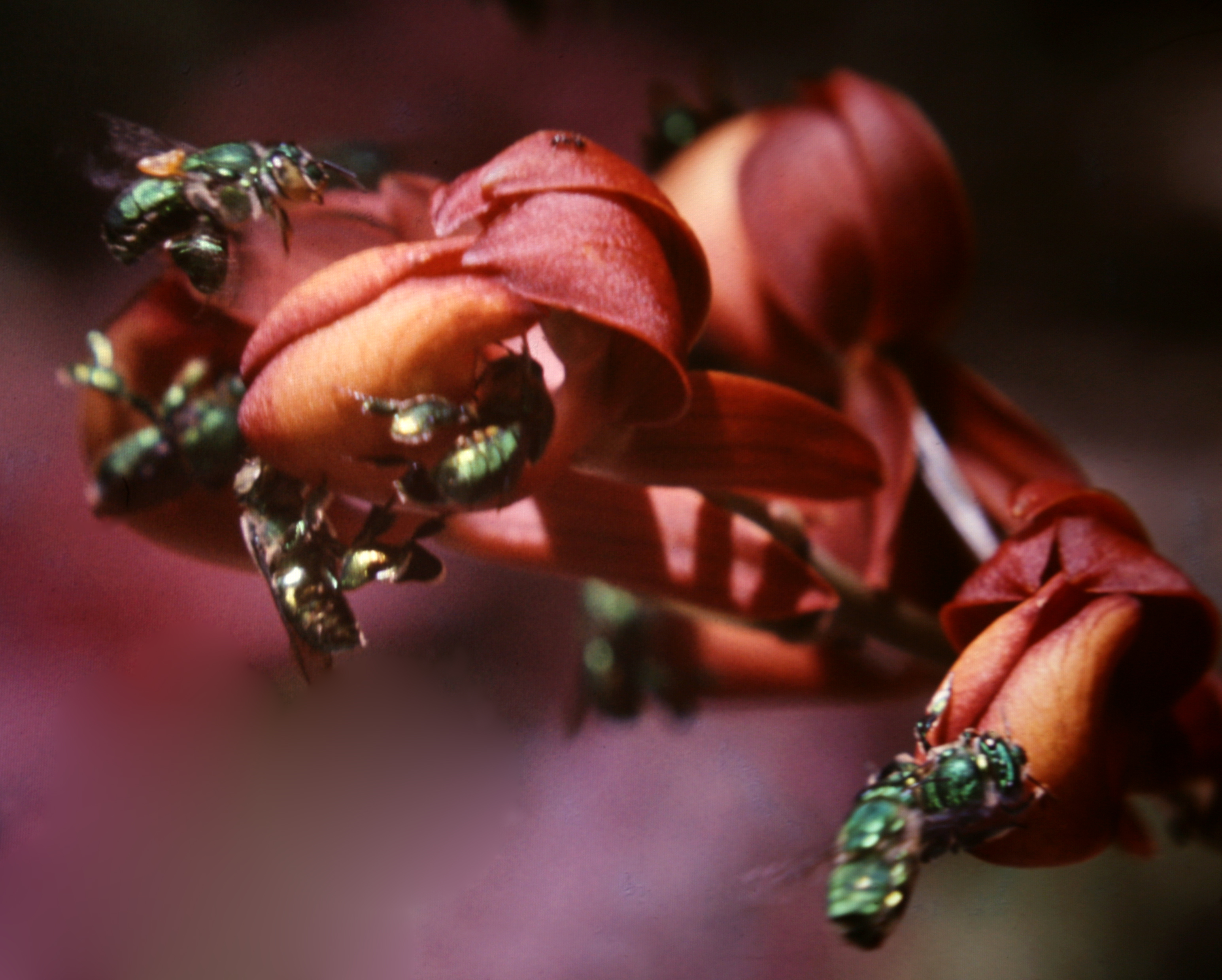
- Mormodes buccinator

Scientific classification
- Kingdom: Plantae
- Clade: Tracheophytes
- Clade: Angiosperms
- Clade: Monocots
- Order: Asparagales
- Family: Orchidaceae
- Subfamily: Epidendroideae
- Tribe: Cymbidieae
- Subtribe: Catasetinae
- Genus: Mormodes; Lindl.

Synonyms
- Cyclosia Klotzsch

= Mormodes =

Genus of orchids

Mormodes, abbreviated as Morm. in the horticultural trade, is a genus of approximately 70-80 species of terrestrial and epiphytic orchids native to Mexico, Central America and South America.

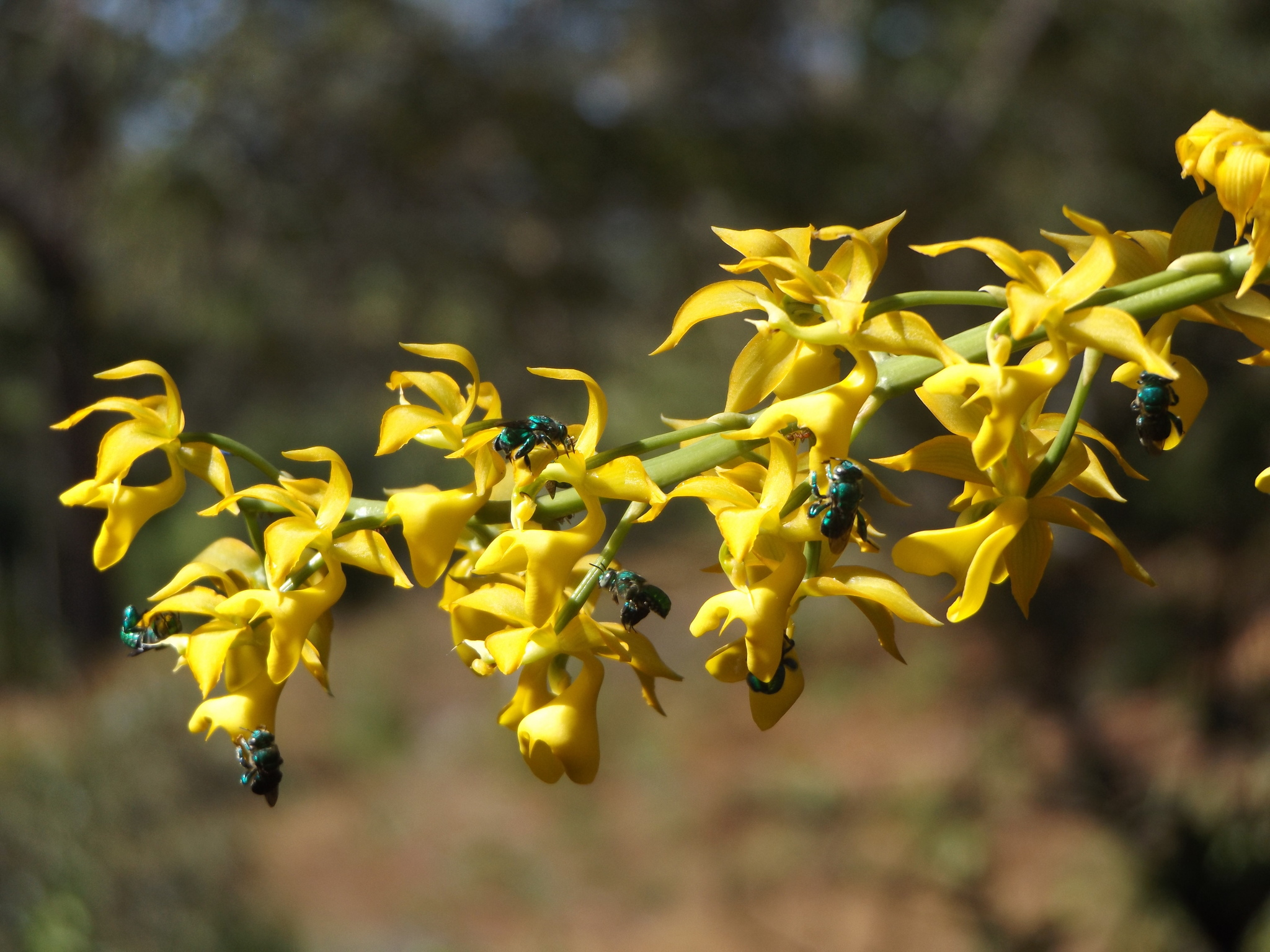
Mormodes badia with orchid bees

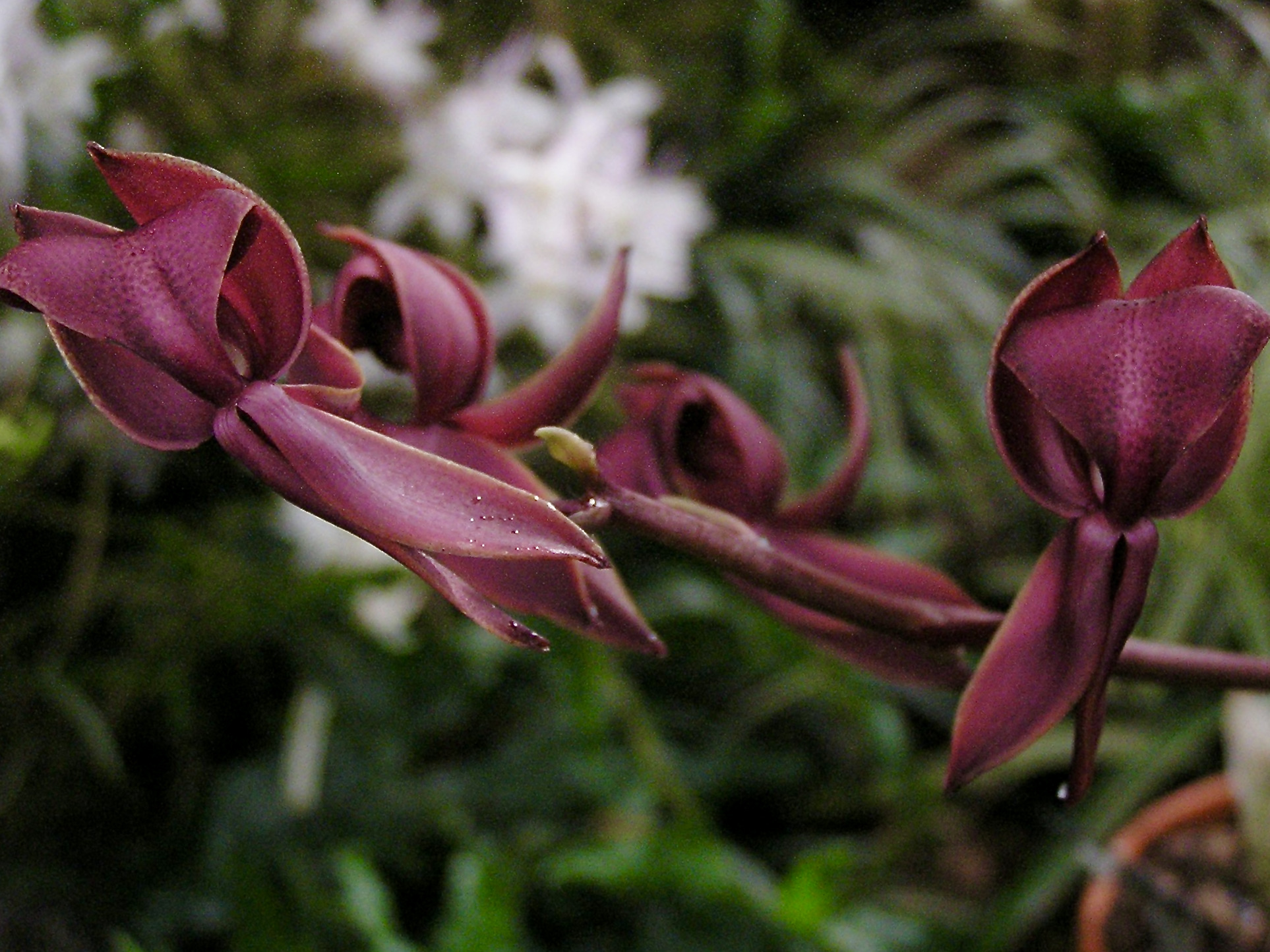
Mormodes horichii

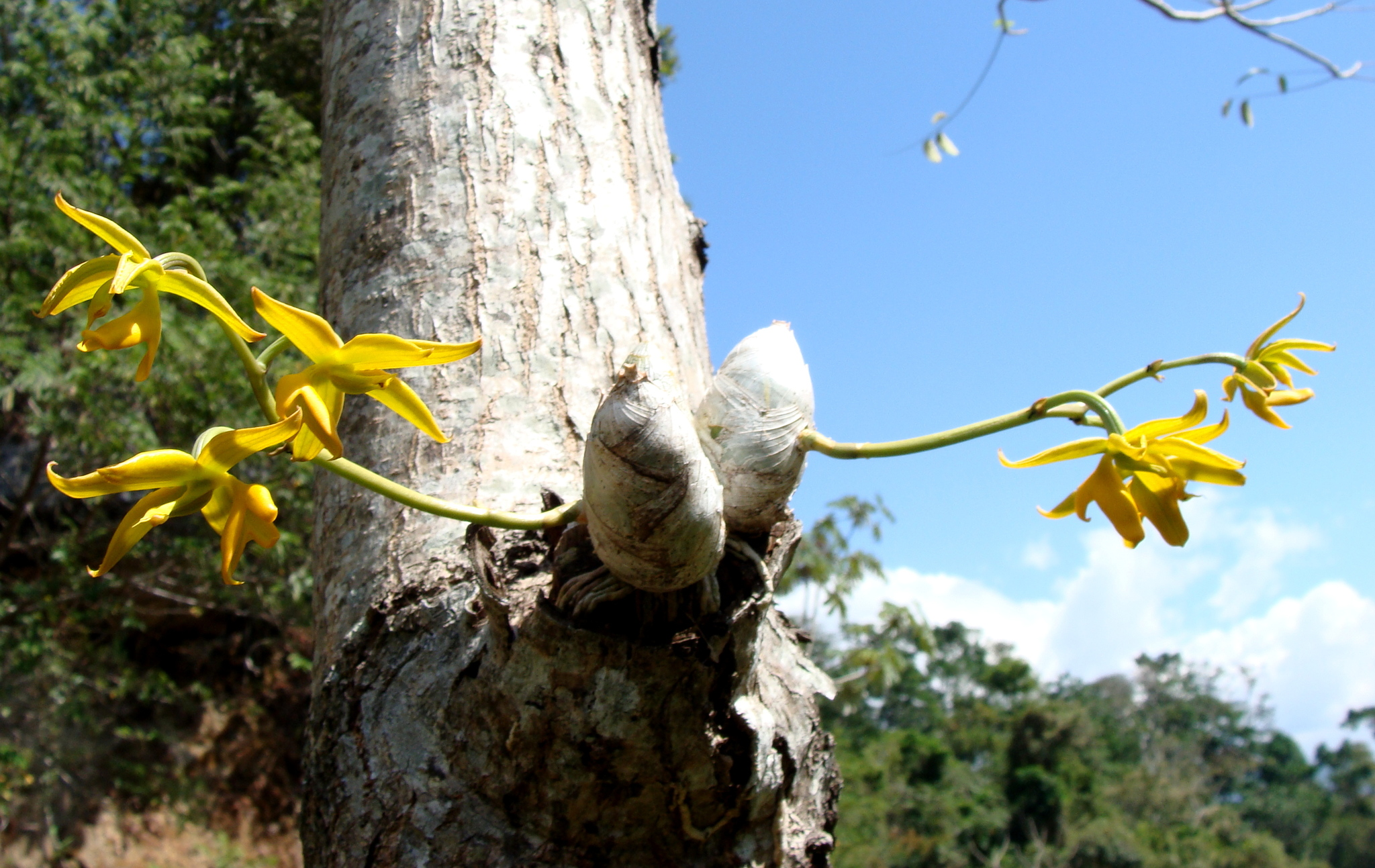
Mormodes lineata

== List of species ==
1. Mormodes andicola Salazar, Orquídea (Mexico City),1992
2. Mormodes andreettae Dodson, 1982
3. Mormodes aromatica Lindl., 1841
4. Mormodes atropurpurea Lindl., 1836
5. Mormodes aurantiaca Schltr., 1925
6. Mormodes aurea L.C.Menezes & Tadaiesky, 1997
7. Mormodes auriculata F.E.L.Miranda, 1989
8. Mormodes badia Rolfe ex W.Watson, 1897
9. Mormodes buccinator Lindl., 1840
10. Mormodes calceolata Fowlie, 1972
11. Mormodes carnevaliana Salazar & G.A.Romero, 1994
12. Mormodes cartonii Hook., 1846
13. Mormodes castroi Salazar, 1993
14. Mormodes chrysantha Salazar, 1993
15. Mormodes claesiana Pabst, 1968
16. Mormodes cogniauxii L.Linden, 1894
17. Mormodes colossus Rchb.f., 1852
18. Mormodes cozticxochitl Salazar, 1990
19. Mormodes cucumerina Pabst, 1972
20. Mormodes dasilvae Salazar, 1993
21. Mormodes densiflora F.E.L.Miranda, 1989
22. Mormodes elegans F.E.L.Miranda, 1989
23. Mormodes ephippilabia Fowlie, 1964
24. Mormodes escobarii Pabst, 1969
25. Mormodes estradae Dodson, 1980
26. Mormodes fractiflexa Rchb.f., 1872
27. Mormodes frymirei Dodson, 1980
28. Mormodes guentheriana (Kraenzl.) Mansf., 1932
29. Mormodes hoehnei F.E.L.Miranda & K.G.Lacerda, 1992
30. Mormodes hookeri Lem., 1851
31. Mormodes horichii Fowlie, 1964
32. Mormodes ignea Lindl. & Paxton, 1852
33. Mormodes issanensis F.E.L.Miranda & K.G.Lacerda, 1992
34. Mormodes lancilabris Pabst, 1975
35. Mormodes lawrenceana Rolfe, 1890
36. Mormodes lineata Bateman ex Lindl., 1841
37. Mormodes lobulata Schltr., Repert. 1910
38. Mormodes luxata Lindl., 1842
39. Mormodes maculata (Klotzsch) L.O.Williams, 1950
40. Mormodes mejiae Pabst, 1974
41. Mormodes morenoi R.Vásquez & Dodson, 1998
42. Mormodes nagelii L.O.Williams, 1940
43. Mormodes oberlanderiana F.Lehm. & Kraenzl., 1900
44. Mormodes ocanae Linden & Rchb.f. in W.G.Walpers, 1863
45. Mormodes oceloteoides S.Rosillo, 1983
46. Mormodes oestlundianum Salazar & Hágsater, 1990
47. Mormodes orinocoensis Salazar & G.A.Romero, 1994
48. Mormodes pabstiana J.Cardeñas, A.Ramírez & S.Rosillo, 1983
49. Mormodes paraensis Salazar & da Silva, 1993
50. Mormodes pardalinata S.Rosillo, 1979
51. Mormodes peruviana Salazar, 1993
52. Mormodes porphyrophlebia Salazar, 1992
53. Mormodes powellii Schltr., 1922
54. Mormodes ramirezii S.Rosillo, 1983
55. Mormodes rodriguesiana Salazar, 1992
56. Mormodes rolfeana L.Linden, 1891
57. Mormodes romanii Dodson, 1980
58. Mormodes rosea Barb.Rodr., 1877
59. Mormodes saccata S.Rosillo, 1983
60. Mormodes sanguineoclaustra Fowlie, 1970
61. Mormodes schultzei Schltr., 1924
62. Mormodes sinuata Rchb.f. & Warm. in H.G.Reichenbach, 1881
63. Mormodes skinneri Rchb.f., 1869
64. Mormodes sotoana Salazar, Orquídea (Mexico City), 1992
65. Mormodes speciosa Linden ex Lindl. & Paxton, 1853
66. Mormodes tapoayensis F.E.L.Miranda & K.G.Lacerda, 1992
67. Mormodes tezontle S.Rosillo, Orquídea (Mexico City), 1980
68. Mormodes tibicen Rchb.f., 1870
69. Mormodes tigrina Barb.Rodr., 1877
70. Mormodes tuxtlensis Salazar, 1988
71. Mormodes uncia Rchb.f., 1869
72. Mormodes variabilis Rchb.f., 1869
73. Mormodes vernixioidea Pabst, 1975
74. Mormodes vernixium Rchb.f., 1887
75. Mormodes vinacea Hoehne, 1910
76. Mormodes warszewiczii Klotzsch, 1854

== Sources ==
- Lindley, J. (1836) A Natural System of Botany 446.
- Pridgeon, A.M., Cribb, P., Chase, M.W., and Rasmussen, F.N. (Eds) (2009) Genera Orchidacearum Volume 5: Epidendroideae (Part 2): Epidendroideae, 35 ff. Oxford: Oxford University Press.
