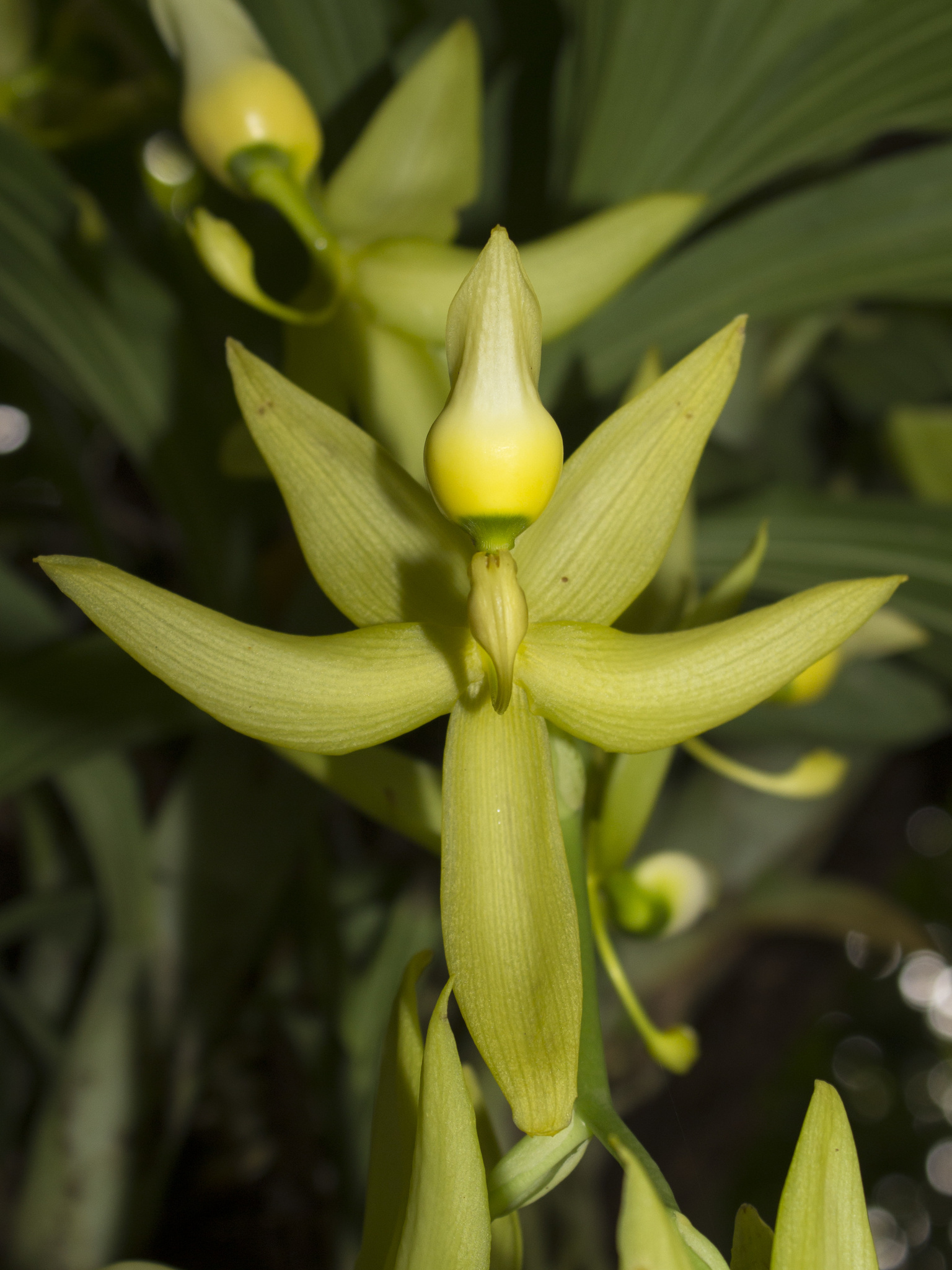
- In Mexico
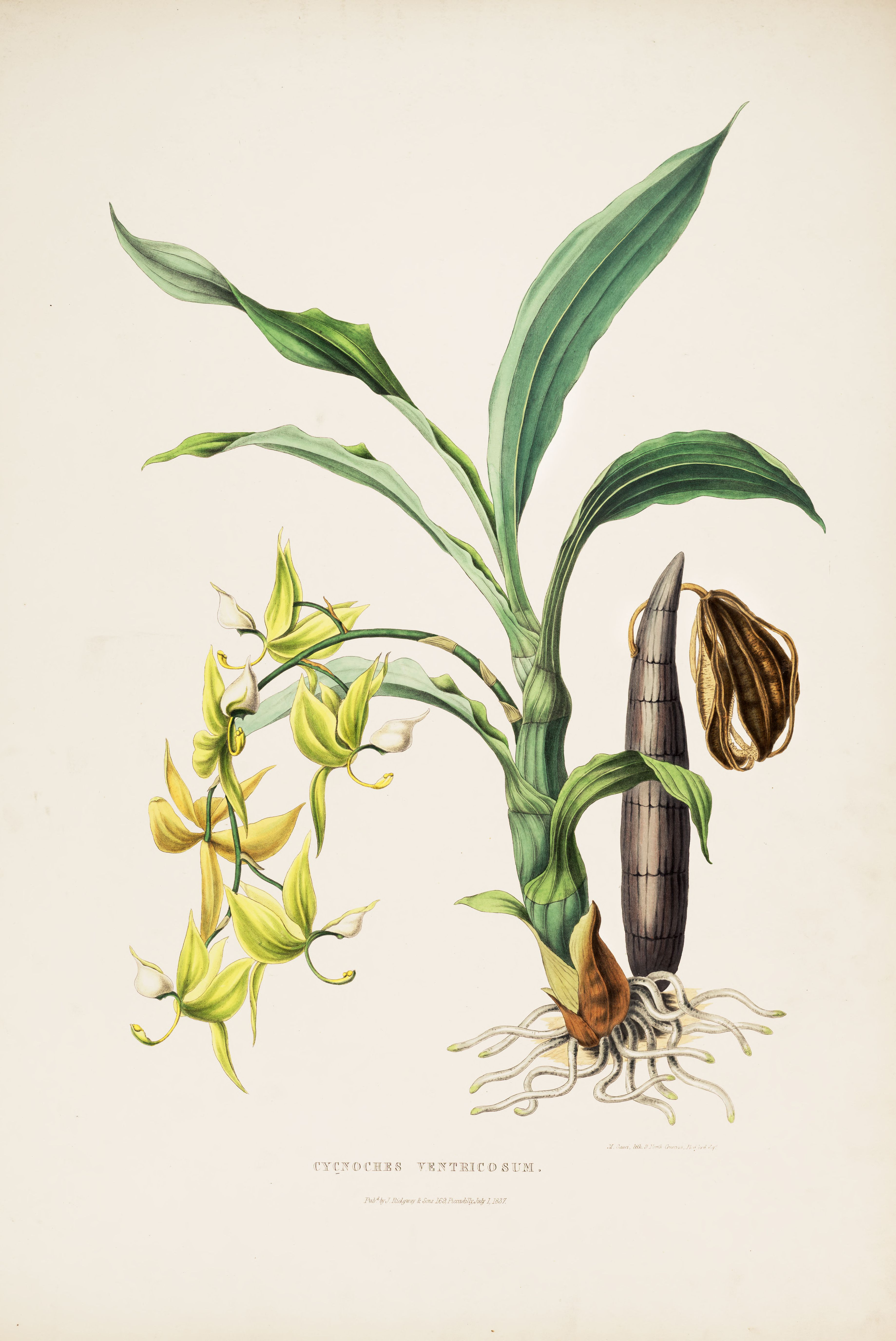
- 1842 illustration from Orchidaceae of Mexico and Guatemala

Scientific classification
- Kingdom: Plantae
- Clade: Tracheophytes
- Clade: Angiosperms
- Clade: Monocots
- Order: Asparagales
- Family: Orchidaceae
- Subfamily: Epidendroideae
- Genus: Cycnoches
- Species: C. ventricosum

Binomial name
- Cycnoches ventricosum Bateman (1838)

= Cycnoches ventricosum =

Species of orchid

Cycnoches ventricosum is a species of orchid native to southern Mexico, Belize and Central America.
