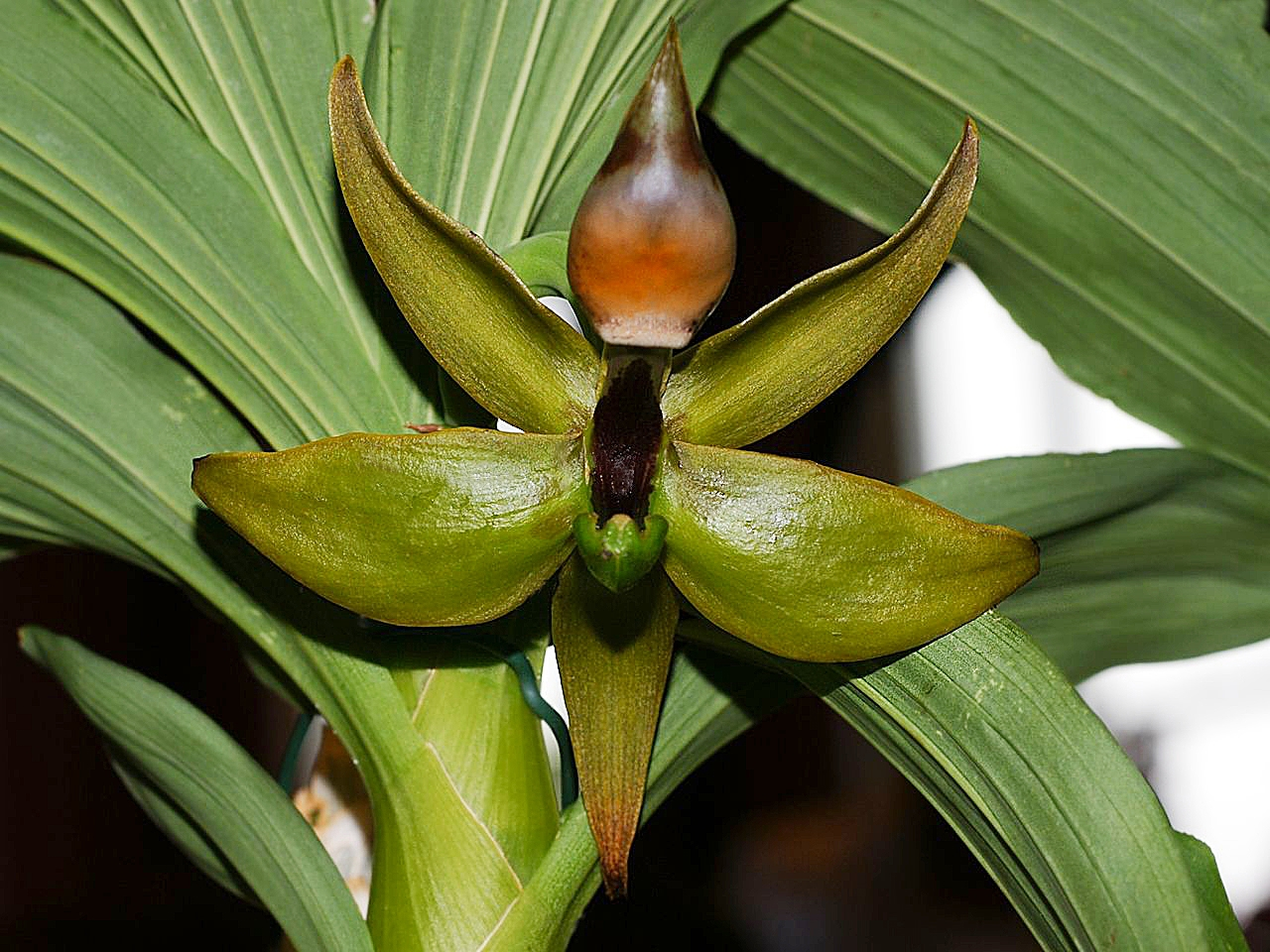
- Cycnoches loddigesii

Scientific classification
- Kingdom: Plantae
- Clade: Tracheophytes
- Clade: Angiosperms
- Clade: Monocots
- Order: Asparagales
- Family: Orchidaceae
- Subfamily: Epidendroideae
- Tribe: Cymbidieae
- Subtribe: Catasetinae
- Genus: Cycnoches; Lindl.

Type species
- Cycnoches loddigesii Lindl.

= Cycnoches =

Genus of orchids

Cycnoches is a genus of orchids native to South America, Central America and southern Mexico. Also called swan necks, swan orchids, or swanworts, they are epiphytes found in lowland and pre-montane forests.

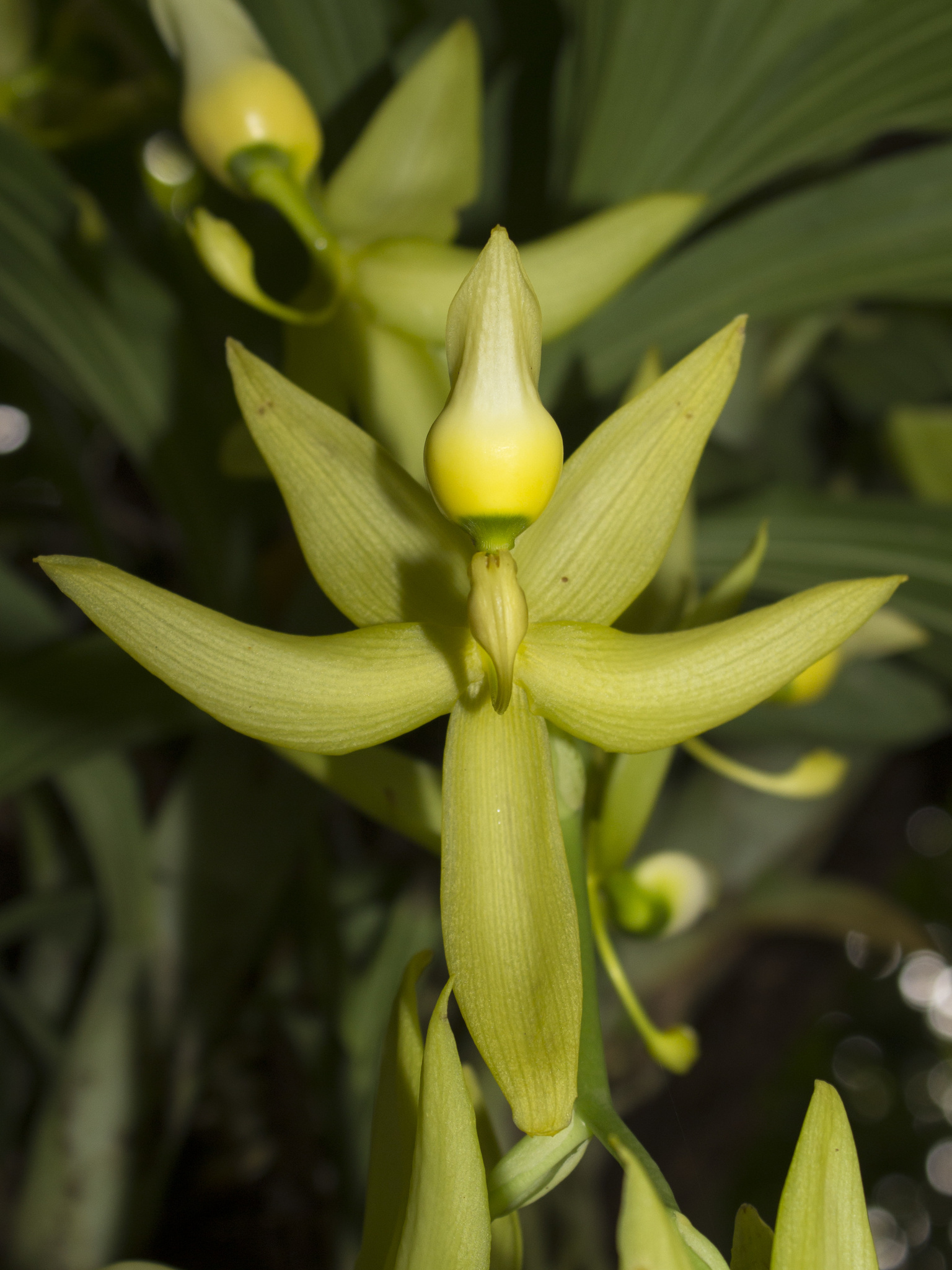
Cycnoches ventricosum

== List of species ==
Species accepted as of May 2025:

1. Cycnoches aureum Lindl. & Paxton (1852) – Costa Rica, Honduras, Panama
2. Cycnoches barthiorum G.F.Carr & Christenson (1999) – Colombia
3. Cycnoches bennettii Dodson (1989) – Peru
4. Cycnoches brachydactylon Schltr. (1924) – Colombia
5. Cycnoches carrii Christenson (1999) – Peru
6. Cycnoches chlorochilon Klotzsch (1838) – Panama, Colombia, Venezuela, Brazil, French Guiana
7. Cycnoches christensonii D.E.Benn. (1998) – Peru
8. Cycnoches cooperi Rolfe (1913) – Peru, Brazil
9. Cycnoches dianae Rchb.f. (1852) – Panama
10. Cycnoches egertonianum Bateman (1842) – southern Mexico, Central America, Colombia
11. Cycnoches farnsworthianum D.E.Benn. & Christenson (2001) – Peru
12. Cycnoches glanduliferum Rolfe (1892) – southern Mexico, Central America
13. Cycnoches guttulatum Schltr. (1922) – Costa Rica, Nicaragua, Panama
14. Cycnoches haagii Barb.Rodr. (1881) – from Colombia to French Guiana, south to Bolivia and Brazil
15. Cycnoches herrenhusanum Jenny & G.A.Romero (1991) – Colombia, Ecuador
16. Cycnoches jarae Dodson & D.E.Benn. (1989) – Peru
17. Cycnoches lehmannii Rchb.f. (1878) – Ecuador, Peru
18. Cycnoches loddigesii Lindl. (1832) – from Colombia to French Guiana, south to Brazil
19. Cycnoches lusiae G.A.Romero & Garay (1999) – Venezuela
20. Cycnoches maculatum Lindl. (1840) – Colombia, Venezuela
21. Cycnoches manoelae P.Castro & Campacci (1993) – Brazil
22. Cycnoches pachydactylon Schltr. (1922) – Nicaragua, Panama
23. Cycnoches pentadactylon Lindl. (1843) – Peru, Brazil
24. Cycnoches peruvianum Rolfe (1891) – Ecuador, Peru
25. Cycnoches powellii Schltr. (1922) – Panama
26. Cycnoches quatuorcristis D.E.Benn. (1992) – Peru
27. Cycnoches rossianum Rolfe (1891) – Costa Rica
28. Cycnoches schmidtianum Christenson & G.F.Carr (2001) – Peru
29. Cycnoches stenodactylon Schltr. (1922) – Panama
30. Cycnoches suarezii Dodson (1989) – Ecuador
31. Cycnoches thurstoniorum Dodson (1989) – Colombia, Venezuela, Ecuador
32. Cycnoches ventricosum Bateman (1838) – Mexico, Central America
33. Cycnoches warszewiczii Rchb.f. (1852) – Costa Rica, Nicaragua, Panama
