= Black orchid =

Black orchid or Black Orchid may refer to:

== Books and comics ==
- Black Orchid (comics), a DC Comics miniseries created by Neil Gaiman
- Black Orchid (character), a character from DC Comics
- Black Orchids, a Nero Wolfe double mystery by Rex Stout
  - "Black Orchids" (novella), the first story in the above
- Black Orchid (Killer Instinct), a character in the Killer Instinct video game series

== Film and television ==
- Black Orchid (film), a 1953 film with Ronald Howard
- The Black Orchid (film), a 1958 film with Sophia Loren and Anthony Quinn
- Black Orchid (Doctor Who), a Doctor Who serial
- Black Orchids (film), a 1917 American silent drama film

== Music ==
- The Black Orchid (nightclub), a Chicago night club from 1949 to 1959
- Black Orchid (band), an Australian gothic metal band
- Black Orchid (album), a 1962 jazz album by the Three Sounds
- Black Orchid, a 1987 Hawaiian album by Peter Moon Band
- "Black Orchid", a song by Stevie Wonder from Stevie Wonder's Journey Through "The Secret Life of Plants"
- "Black Orchid", a jazz tune written by Neal Hefti
- "Black Orchid", a song by Avantasia from The Mystery of Time
- “Black Orchid”, a song by Blue October from The Answers

== Plants ==
- Any member of several species of genus Bulbophyllum, commonly called "black orchid"
- Calanthe triplicata or Australian Black orchid
- Coelogyne mayeriana, a species of orchid native to Southeast Asia
- Coelogyne pandurata (Black orchid), a species of orchid native to Borneo
- Coelogyne ovalis, a species of orchid native to Indochina
- Coelogyne usitana, a species of orchid native to the Philippines
- Coelogyne xyrekes, a species of orchid native to Southeast Asia
- Cymbidiella falcigera and Cymbidiella humblotii (Black orchid), species of orchid native to Madagascar and Île aux Nattes
- Cymbidium canaliculatum (Queensland black orchid), a species of orchid native to northern and eastern Australia
- Dendrobium johannis var nigrescens, a species of orchid from Australia
- Disa cornuta, a species of orchid from South Africa
- Dracula benedictii, a species of orchid from Colombia
- Dracula minax, a species of orchid from Colombia
- Dracula ubangina, a species of orchid from Ecuador
- Dracula vampira, a species of orchid found on the slopes of Mount Pichincha in Ecuador
- Fredclarkeara (Truly black orchid), a hybrid genus consisting of the genera Catasetum, Clowesia, and Mormodes
- Grammatophyllum wallisii, a species of orchid from the Philippines
- Liparis nervosa (Black orchid), a species of orchid native to Japan and China
- Masdevallia rolfeana (Black orchid), a species of orchid native to Central America
- Maxillaria schunkeana, also known as Brasiliorchis schunkeana, a species of orchid native to Brazil
- Maxillaria variabilis, a species of orchid native to Central America
- Monnierara (Black orchid), a hybrid genus consisting of the genera Catasetum, Cycnoches, and Mormodes
- Ophrys insectifera, a species of orchid from Europe
- Paphiopedilum
- Phalaenopsis mannii, a species of orchid native to Nepal and China
- Prosthechea cochleata (Black orchid), the national flower of Belize that is also known as the Clamshell (or Cockleshell) orchid
- Stanhopea tigrina var. nigroviolacea or Stanhopea nigroviolacea, a species of orchid from Mexico
- Stelis immersa (Black orchid), a species of orchid ranging from Mexico to Venezuela
- Trichoglottis atropurpurea (Black orchid), a species of orchid native to the Philippines

== Other uses ==
- Black Orchid (fragrance), first perfume released by Tom Ford Beauty

== See also ==
- Bouquet of Black Orchids, a compilation album by The Tear Garden
