= Orchid (disambiguation) =

An orchid is a member of the flowering plant family Orchidaceae.

Orchid may also refer to:

== Persons ==
- Orchid I. Jordan (1910–1995), American politician

== Places ==
- Orchid, Florida, United States
- Orchid, Missouri, United States
- Orchid, Virginia, United States

=== Fictional locations ===
- The Orchid, a Dharma Initiative research station on the TV series Lost

== Entertainment ==
=== Literature ===
- The Orchid (novel), a 1905 novel by Robert Grant
- The Orchid, a 1931 novel by Robert Nathan
- The Orchid, a 1975 photography book by Takashi Kijima
- Orchid, a comic book series by American musician Tom Morello

=== Film, TV and theatre ===
- The Orchid (musical), a 1903 musical play
- The Orchid (film), a 1951 Argentine drama film

=== Music ===
==== Groups and bands ====
- Orchid (screamo band), a band from Massachusetts active originally between 1997 and 2002, and 2024-present
- Orchid (heavy metal band), a band from California active since 2007
- The Orchids, a Scottish pop group

==== Albums ====
- Orchid (Opeth album), the debut album released in 1995 of the progressive metal and progressive rock band Opeth
- Orchid (Orchid album), third and final album by American screamo band Orchid released in 2002
- Orchids (album), the debut album of dream pop band Astral

==== Songs ====
- "Orchid," a song by Black Sabbath on the album Master of Reality
- "Orchid," a song by Alanis Morissette on the album Flavors of Entanglement
- "Orchid," a song by Erra on the album Drift
- "Orchids," a song by Stone Sour on the album Stone Sour

== Organisations, groups, companies ==
- Orchid Technology, a technology company
- Orchid Chemicals & Pharmaceuticals, an Indian pharmaceutical firm
- Orchid (charity), a cancer research organization

== Other uses ==
- Orchid (color), a bright rich purple color

== See also ==
- Black orchid (disambiguation)
- Orchard (disambiguation)
- ORCID, Open Researcher and Contributor ID
- Orquídeas, a 2024 album by Kali Uchis
- Ohrid (disambiguation)
