= Serbian Patriarch (disambiguation) =

The title Serbian Patriarch may refer to:

- primates of the former Serbian Patriarchate of Peć (1346–1766)
- primates of the former Serbian Patriarchate of Karlovci (1848–1920)
- primates of the Serbian Orthodox Church (1920–present)

== See also ==
- List of heads of the Serbian Orthodox Church
- Serbian Patriarchate (disambiguation)
- Patriarchate of Peć (disambiguation)
- Serbian Archbishopric (disambiguation)
