= The Black Orchid =

The Black Orchid may refer to:

- The Black Orchid (1916 film), a 1916 film starring Grace Darmond
- The Black Orchid (film), a 1958 film starring Sophia Loren and Anthony Quinn
- The Black Orchid (nightclub), a former Chicago nightclub

== See also ==
- Black orchid (disambiguation)
