= Unleavened bread (disambiguation) =

Unleavened bread refers to bread which is not prepared with a raising agent.

Unleavened Bread may also refer to:

== Literature ==
- Unleavened Bread, poetry by Norman Gale 1885
- Unleavened Bread (Robert Grant novel) 1900
- Unleavened Bread (play) 1901 Broadway play based on the novel
