= Achrida (disambiguation) =

Achrida is the medieval Greek and Latin name of the modern city of Ohrid.

Achrida or Acrida may also refer to:

- Any one of the Eastern Orthodox Ohrid Archbishoprics
- Roman Catholic Archdiocese of Ohrid
- Acrida, a genus of grasshoppers
