= Metropolitanate of Skopje (disambiguation) =

The term Metropolitanate of Skopje may refer to:

- Metropolitanate of Skopje, an Eastern Orthodox canonical metropolitanate with seat in the city of Skopje, that historically existed in continuity, under several consequent ecclesiastical jurisdictions.
- Bulgarian Orthodox Metropolitanate of Skopje, an Eastern Orthodox (noncanonical) metropolitanate of the Bulgarian Exarchate, that existed in the second half of 19th century and the beginning of 20th century.
- Macedonian Orthodox Metropolitanate of Skopje, an Eastern Orthodox metropolitanate of the Macedonian Orthodox Church, created in 1967 (noncanonical 1967–2022).
- Metropolis of Skopia, under jurisdiction of the Ecumenical Patriarchate from 1766 to 1920.

== See also ==
- Skopje
- Archbishopric of Ohrid (disambiguation)
- Eastern Orthodoxy in North Macedonia
- Serbian Patriarchate of Peć
- Bulgarian Exarchate
- Macedonian Orthodox Church
