= Serbian Patriarchate =

Serbian Patriarchate may refer to:

- Serbian Patriarchate of Peć, medieval and early modern Serbian Patriarchate with its seat in the Patriarchate of Peć Monastery of Peć, from 1346 to 1766
- Patriarchate of Karlovci or Patriarchate of Karlovci, particular Serbian Patriarchate in the Habsburg Monarchy with its seat in Sremski Karlovci, from 1848 to 1920
- Serbian Orthodox Church, contemporary Serbian Patriarchate with its seat in Belgrade, from 1920 to the present

Serbian Patriarchate may also colloquially refer to:

- Palace of the Patriarchate, Sremski Karlovci in Sremski Karlovci
- Palace of the Patriarchate, Belgrade in Belgrade

== See also ==
- Serbian Patriarch (disambiguation)
- Patriarchate of Peć (disambiguation)
- Serbian Archbishopric (disambiguation)
