= Ohrid (disambiguation) =

Ohrid is a city in the Republic of North Macedonia.

== Places ==
- Ohrid Municipality, a municipality in the southwestern part of the Republic of North Macedonia
- Lake Ohrid, between southwestern North Macedonia and eastern Albania
- Ohrid, Bulgaria, a village
- Ohrid "St. Paul the Apostle" Airport or Ohrid Airport, an airport in Ohrid, Republic of North Macedonia

== Other uses ==
- Ohrid dialect, a dialect of Macedonian
- FK Ohrid, a football club from the city of Ohrid in the Republic of North Macedonia
- Battle of Ohrid, took place on 14 or 15 September 1464 between the Ottoman Empire's forces and Skanderbeg's Albania
- "Ohrid i muzika", the Macedonian entry of the Junior Eurovision Song Contest 2013

== See also ==
- Ohrid trout, a fish
- Ohrid Agreement, the 2001 peace deal between the Republic of North Macedonia and ethnic Albanian representatives
- Ohrid Fest, a music festival
- Ohrid Summer Festival
- Ohrid Archbishopric (disambiguation)
- Ahrida Synagogue of Istanbul, in Istanbul, Turkey
- Orchid (disambiguation)
- Ohri (disambiguation)
