= Pichincha (volcano) =

Volcano in north-central Ecuador

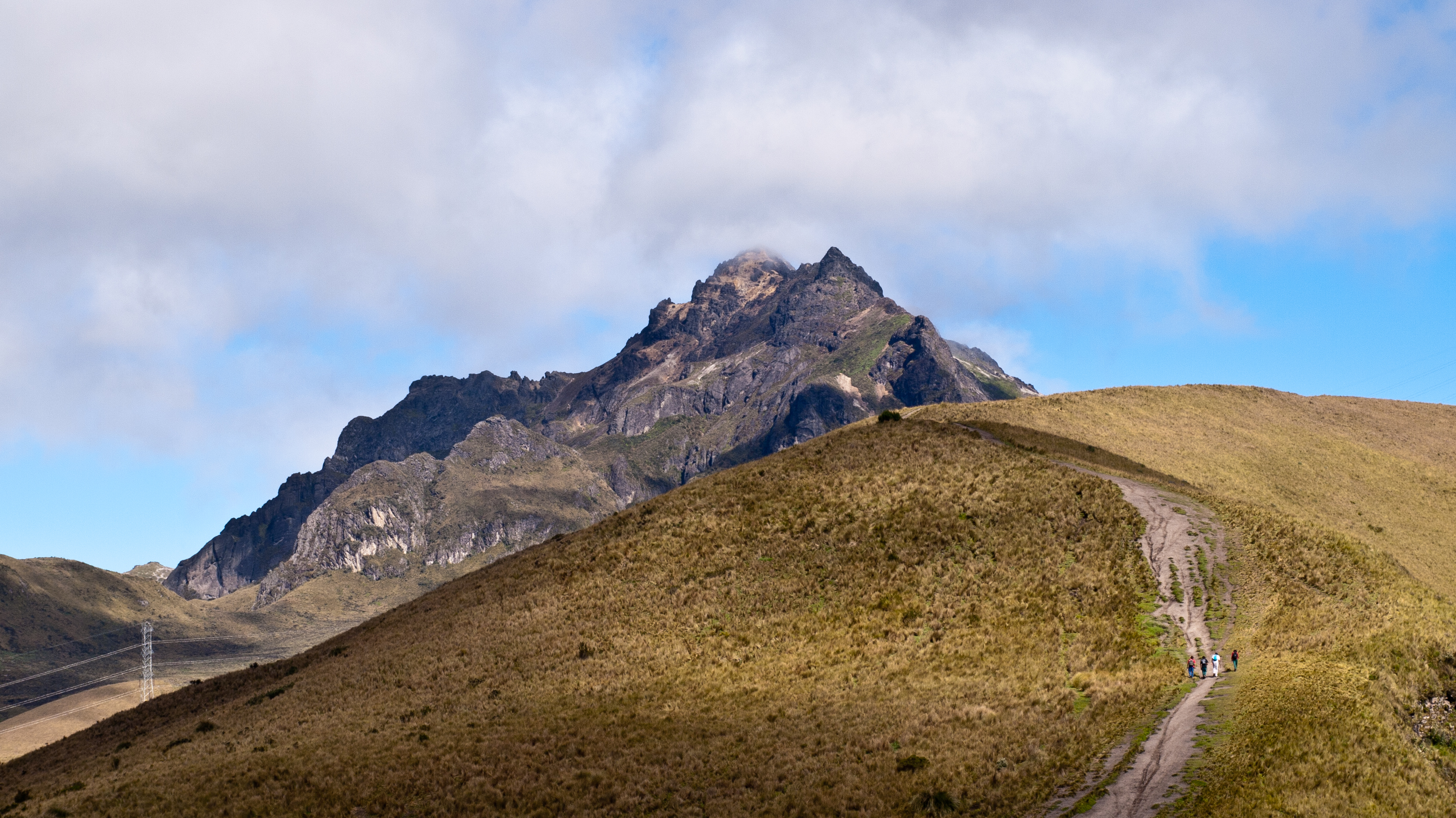
- Ruku Pichincha as seen from the trail from Quito to the top

Highest point
- Elevation: 4,784 m (15,696 ft)
- Prominence: 1,652 m (5,420 ft)
- Listing: Ultra
- Coordinates: 0°10′16″S 78°35′53″W

Geography
- Location within Ecuador
- Location: Quito, Pichincha, Ecuador
- Parent range: Andes

Geology
- Rock age: Quaternary
- Mountain type: Stratovolcano
- Volcanic zone: North Volcanic Zone
- Last eruption: October to December 2002

Climbing
- First ascent: 1582 by José Ortiguera and others (first recorded ascent of Guagua Pichincha).

Pichincha is a stratovolcano in Ecuador. The capital Quito wraps around its eastern slopes.

The two highest peaks of the mountain are Wawa Pichincha (Kichwa wawa child, baby / small, Spanish spelling Guagua Pichincha) (4,784 metres (15,696 ft)) and Ruku Pichincha (Kichwa ruku old person, Spanish Rucu Pichincha) (4,698 metres (15,413 ft)). The active caldera is in Wawa Pichincha on the western side of the mountain.

== Description ==
Both peaks are visible from the city of Quito and both are popular acclimatization climbs. Wawa Pichincha is usually accessed from the village of Lloa outside of Quito. Ruku is typically accessed from the TelefériQo on the western side of Quito.

In October 1999, the volcano erupted and covered the city with several inches of ash. Before that, the last major eruptions were in 1553 and in 1660, when about 30 cm (12 in) of ash fell on the city.

The province in which it is located was named for the mountain. This is also the case for many of the other provinces in Ecuador (including Cotopaxi, Chimborazo, and Imbabura).

== Geography ==
Dracula vampira, a type of orchid, can be found on the volcano, at an altitude of 1,900–2,200 m (6,200–7,200 ft) above sea level.

== Eruptions ==
In 1660, Pichincha underwent a Plinian eruption, spreading ash over 1,000 kilometres (621 mi), with over 30 centimetres (12 in) of ash falling on Quito.

The most recent significant eruption began in August 1998. On March 12, 2000, a phreatic eruption killed two volcanologists who were working on the lava dome.

== History ==
The volcano was considered sacred to numerous cultures of the indigenous peoples who lived in this region for thousands of years before encounter with Spanish and other Europeans.

The first recorded ascent of Guagua Pichincha was in 1582 by a group of locals led by José Ortiguera.

In 1737 several members of the French Geodesic Mission to the equator, including Charles-Marie de La Condamine, Pierre Bouguer and Antonio de Ulloa, spent 23 days on the summit of Rucu Pichincha as part of their triangulation work to calculate the length of a degree of latitude. On 17 June 1742, during the same mission, La Condamine and Bouguer made an ascent of Guagua Pichincha and looked down into the crater of the volcano, which had last erupted in 1660. La Condamine compared what he saw to the underworld.

In the summer season of 1802, Alexander von Humboldt climbed and measured the altitude of this mountain and several other volcanoes in the region. Humboldt's writings inspired artist Frederic Edwin Church to visit and paint Pichincha and other Andean peaks.

On May 24, 1822, General Sucre's southern campaign in the Spanish–American War of independence came to a climax when his forces defeated the Spanish colonial army on the southeast slopes of this volcano. The engagement, known as the Battle of Pichincha, secured the independence from Spain of the territories of present-day Ecuador.

== See also ==
- Lists of volcanoes
  - List of volcanoes in Ecuador
  - List of stratovolcanoes
