= Ohri =

Ohri may refer to:

== People ==
- Armin Öhri (born 1978), Liechtensteiner writer who was among the winners of the 2014 European Union Prize for Literature
- Hamdi Ohri (1872–1938), Albanian politician
- Vivek Ohri, Indian film producer
- Zyhdi Ohri, Albanian politician

== Places ==
- Ohri, Albanian and Turkish name of Ohrid, city in North Macedonia
- Ohři, instrumental case of the river Ohře, found in many Czech toponyms
- Sanjak of Ohri, Ottoman Empire

== See also ==
- Ohrid (disambiguation)
