= TelefériQo =

Gondola lift in Quito, Ecuador

Coordinates: 0°11′31″S 78°31′8″W

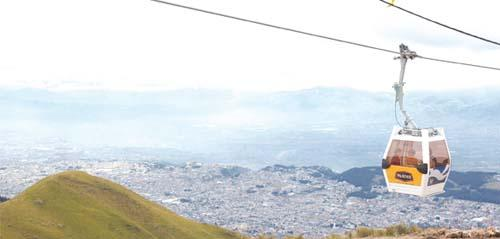
TelefériQo to Pichincha Volcano with Quito in the background

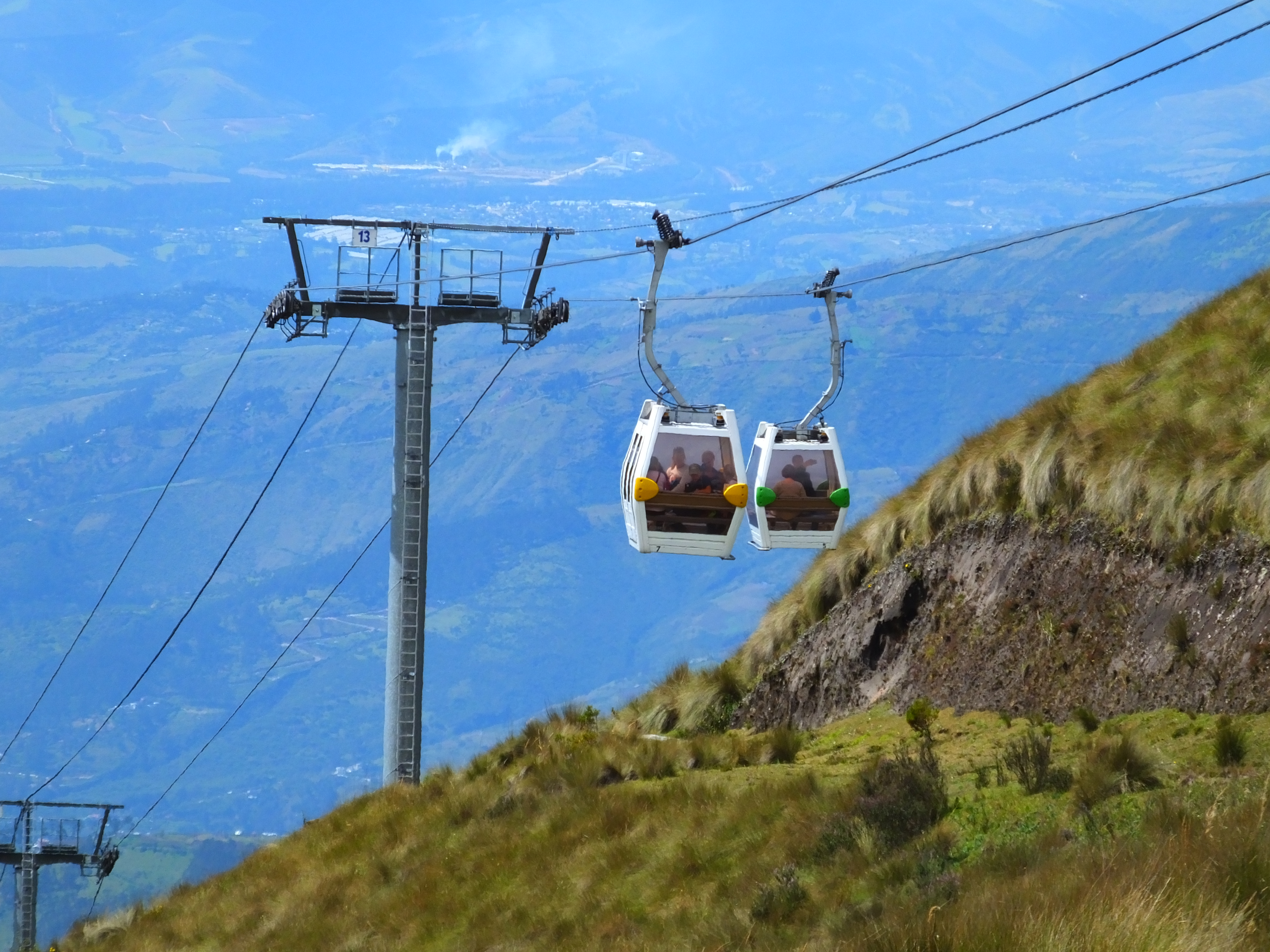
Góndolas of the TelefériQo

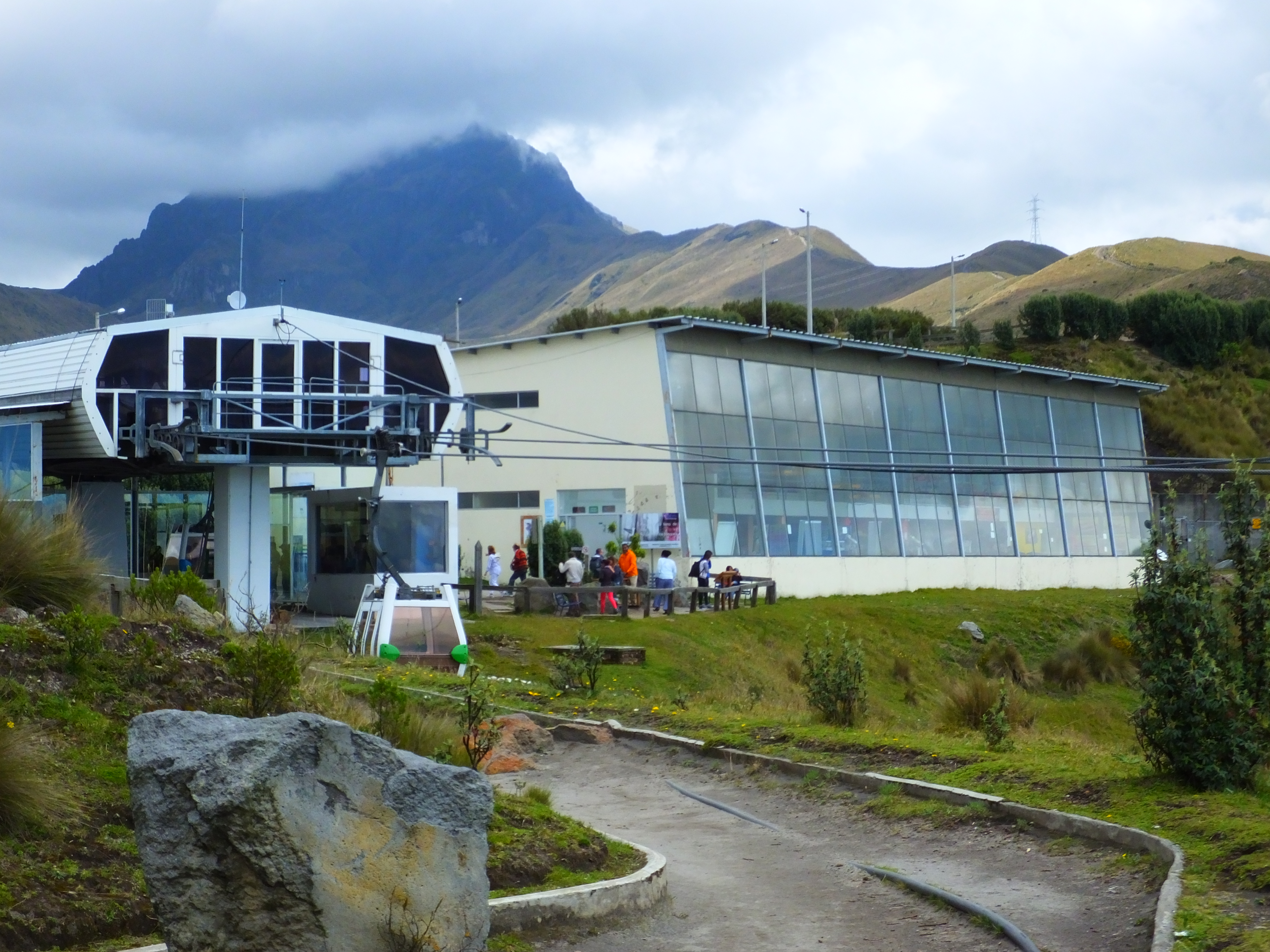
Top station of the TelefériQo with Pichincha Volcano in the background

The TelefériQo (from teleférico and Quito), or TelefériQo Cruz Loma, is a gondola lift in Quito, Ecuador, running from the edge of the city centre up the east side of Pichincha Volcano to the lookout at Cruz Loma. It is one of the highest aerial lifts in the world, rising from 3,117 m (10,226 ft) to 3,945 m (12,943 ft). The ascent takes about twenty minutes, traveling 2,237 linear metres.

== Overview ==
The TelefériQo opened in July 2005. It is both a tourist attraction, and a gateway for hiking to the summit of Pichincha, an active stratovolcano.

As of 2018, a photo ID is required to purchase a lift ticket, and the ticket stub must be retained for the return trip. This policy serves as a built-in alert system in case hikers do not return when expected.

Many photo opportunities and observation points await tourists at the top of the lift. Additionally, there is a public restroom, a small cafe, and a few shops, but much of the retail complex sits unoccupied.

== Climate ==
Due to the increased altitude and the wind on the mountain it is cooler than the city and is susceptible to fog, especially in the mornings. The height of the upper station is enough to cause symptoms of altitude sickness in some individuals.

The visitor centre at the base includes the VulQano Park amusement park, restaurants and food court, the world's highest go kart track, and other attractions.
