= Astral (band) =

American shoegaze group

- Origin: San Francisco, California, United States
- Genres: Shoegazing
- Years active: 1999–present
- Members: Dave Han
- Past members: John Robles Scott Christy
- Website: http://www.vibraphonerecords.com

Astral is a shoegaze group based in San Francisco, California, United States. Astral was formed by singer-guitarist Dave Han and drummer Shawn in 1999; bassist Amy Rosenoff joined them in 2001. Their vocals are frequently compared to those of The Cure; other influences include My Bloody Valentine and Joy Division. Their music is of an ethereal, melodic nature; this ambient sound is created largely by heavy use of distortion and feedback effects in Han's guitar. Astral are also notable for incorporating improvisation into their live performances. In 2002, Astral released a self-produced EP, "Only Sometimes". In 2003, Astral released an LP, entitled "Orchids". Two songs from that album, "Raining Down" and the title-track instrumental, were preloaded in the Rio Carbon MP3 Players. In 2008 the band released their second album Sleepwalker.

== Current lineup ==
- Dave Han – Vocals, Guitars
- Gary Hews – Bass
- Mark Shriver – Drums

== Original lineup ==
- Dave Han – Vocals, Guitars
- Shawn Nakano – Drums, Percussion
- Amy Rosenoff – Bass

== Discography ==
- Only Sometimes (EP) 2002
- Second Stitch (EP) 2002
- Orchids 2003
- Transmitter (EP) April 2007
- "Turn Me Around" (7" single) 2002
- Sleepwalker 2007
- "A Lullaby from Amsterdam" (7" single) 2008
- Excerpts from Down the Rabbit Hole (EP) 2010
- Forever After 2010
