= Robert Grant (novelist) =

American author and jurist (1852–1940)

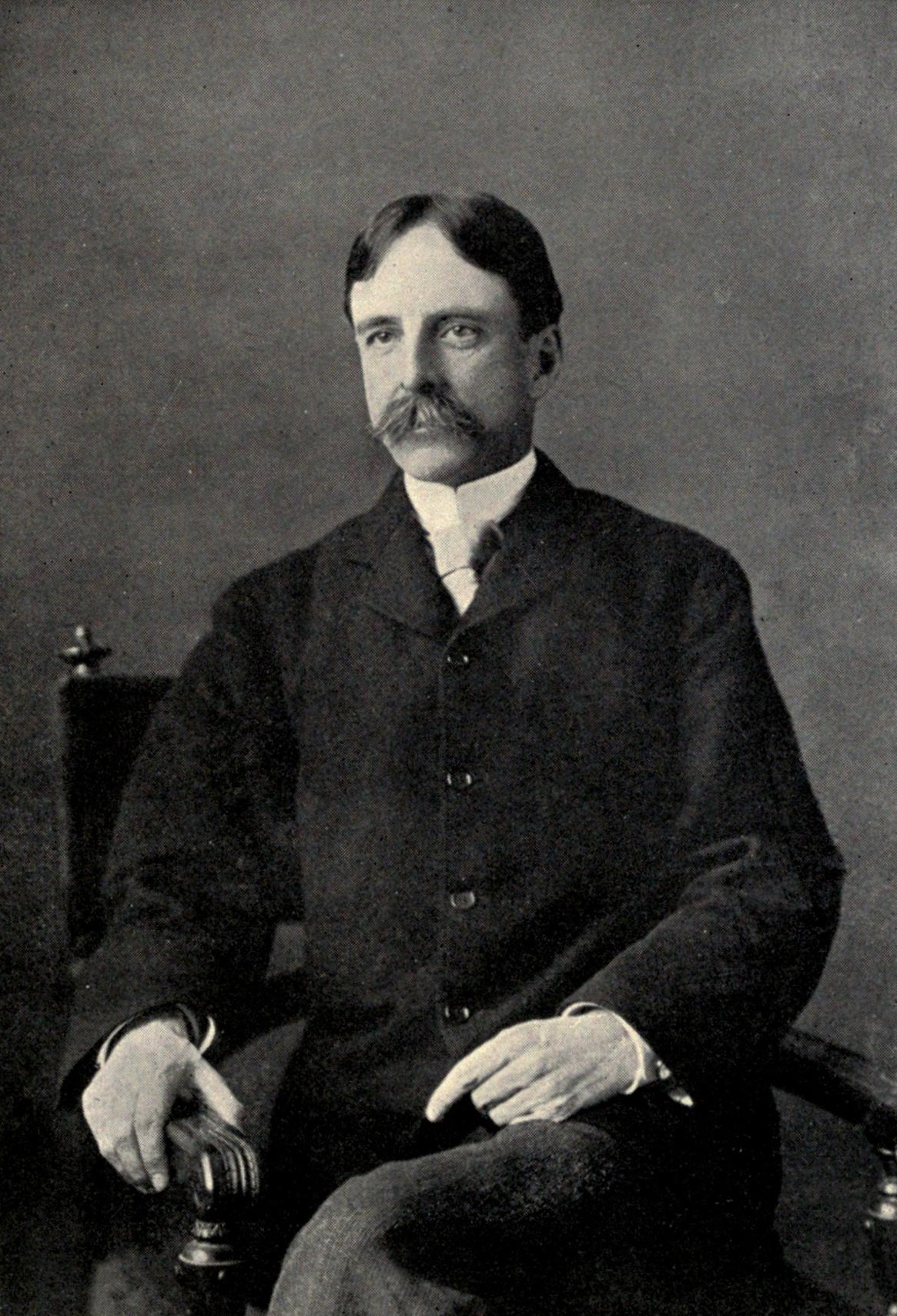
- Born: January 24, 1852; Boston, Massachusetts, US
- Died: May 19, 1940 (aged 88); Boston, Massachusetts, US
- Occupations: Writer, jurist

Robert Grant (January 24, 1852 – May 19, 1940) was an American writer and a jurist who participated in a review of the Sacco and Vanzetti trial a few weeks before their executions.

== Biography ==
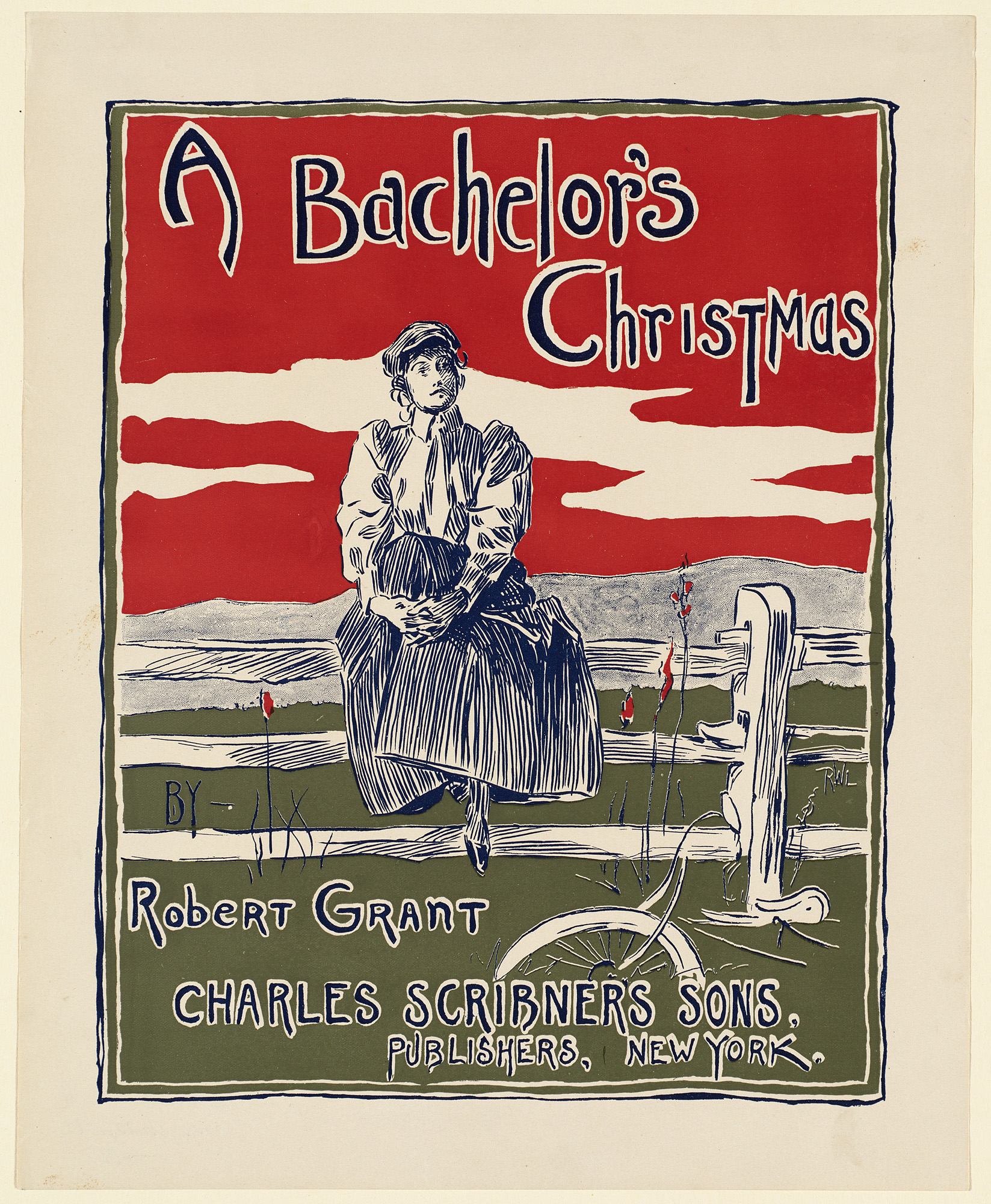
A Bachelor's Christmas by Robert Grant, 1895 poster

Grant was born to Patrick Grant (1810–1895) and Charlotte Boardman (Rice) Grant (1821–1882) in Boston, Massachusetts, on January 24, 1852, and was a descendant of Edmund Rice, an early immigrant to Massachusetts Bay Colony. He attended Boston Latin School and graduated from Harvard University in 1873. At one point in his college career, he was publicly reprimanded for missing chapel on 22 occasions. He received the first Ph.D. in English granted by Harvard in 1876 and a law degree in 1879.

His first novel, published in 1880, was The Confessions of a Frivolous Girl, a realistic depiction of problems facing young women. He published his second novel An Average Man in 1883, a study of two young New York lawyers with very different ambitions. His next novel, published in 1886, was Face to Face, which contrasted English and American manners and social norms. In 1886, Ticknor and Fields published his 198-page novel, The Knave of Hearts, which was billed as a "fairy" story but was actually more of a Victorian romance. He followed that with the novel that proved to be his most successful, Unleavened Bread (1900), the story of a woman who abandons her moral standards in a search for prestige and dominance was one of the best selling novels of 1900.

His output continued with The Undercurrent (1904); The Orchid (1905), an examination of the impact of divorce in the upper class; The Chippendales (1909), the story of the decline in character of a Boston family over the course of several generations; The High Priestess (1915), detailing a woman's struggle to have a career; and The Bishop's Granddaughter (1925), a humorous view and critique of American divorce law.

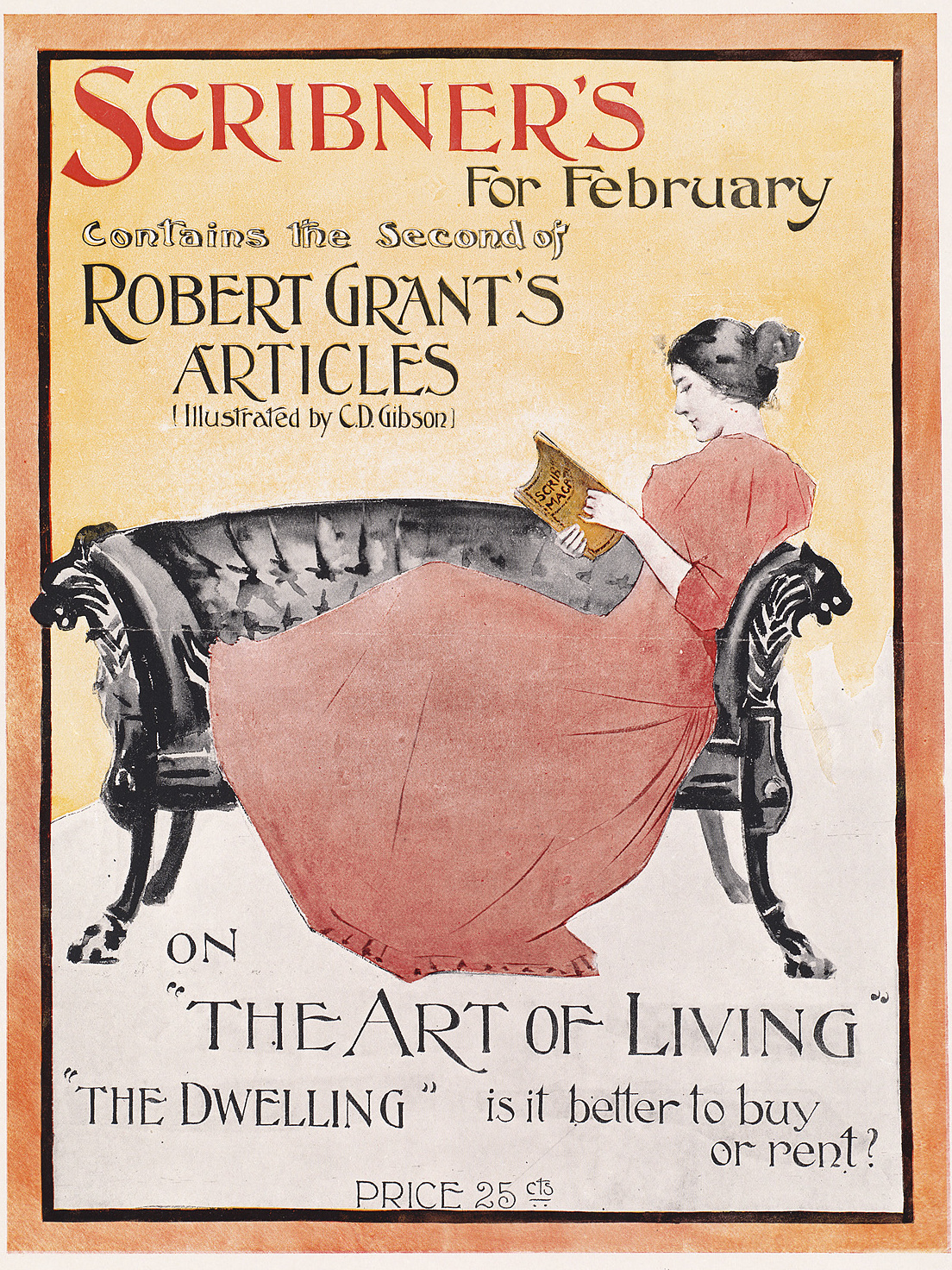
Contains the Second of Robert Grant's Articles (Illustrated by C. D. Gibson) - Scribner's for February poster

At the same time as he pursued his writing, Grant was also served as a probate court judge from 1893 to 1923. He was an Overseer of Harvard University from 1896 to 1921 as well. He served as president of the Harvard Alumni Association in 1922 and of the Harvard Club of Boston in 1923-24 and held honorary degrees from Harvard and Columbia.

He was called out of retirement by Massachusetts Governor Alvan T. Fuller to serve on an Advisory Committee with President Abbott Lawrence Lowell of Harvard and President Samuel Wesley Stratton of MIT. They were tasked with reviewing the trial of Sacco and Vanzetti to determine whether the trial had been fair. Some criticized Grant's appointment to the committee, with one defense lawyer saying he "had a black-tie class concept of life around him," but Harold Laski in a conversation at the time found him "moderate." Others cited evidence of xenophobia in some of his novels, references to "riff-raff" and a variety of racial slurs. A biographer notes that he was not a good choice as he was not a legal scholar and was handicapped by age.

The Committee concluded that the trial had been fair, but its report included some measured criticism of the judge in the case, Webster Thayer. Judge Grant furnished the language that found "a grave breach of judicial decorum". Later, Grant allowed that he was "amazed and incensed" at the biased comments Judge Thayer made outside the courtroom. In later years he was known to struggle with the judgment the committee had rendered, though in his autobiography he took a "defensive, almost bellicose tone." He maintained a particularly acute animus toward Harvard Professor of Law Felix Frankfurter who published an article making the case for the defense in the Atlantic Monthly while appeals were still pending. Grant believed that Frankfurter's article served as the foundation of most criticism of the Sacco and Vanzetti case on the part of intellectuals throughout the world, a view in which he was seconded by Chief Justice of the Supreme Court William Howard Taft.

Following that very public work, he returned to writing. First he produced another novel, The Dark Horse (1931), a study of society and politics in Boston and finally his autobiography Fourscore (1934) when he was 82. He died in Boston on May 19, 1940.

Grant was an early member of the American Academy of Arts and Letters. He was elected a member of the American Academy of Arts and Sciences in 1913.

== Works (partial list) ==
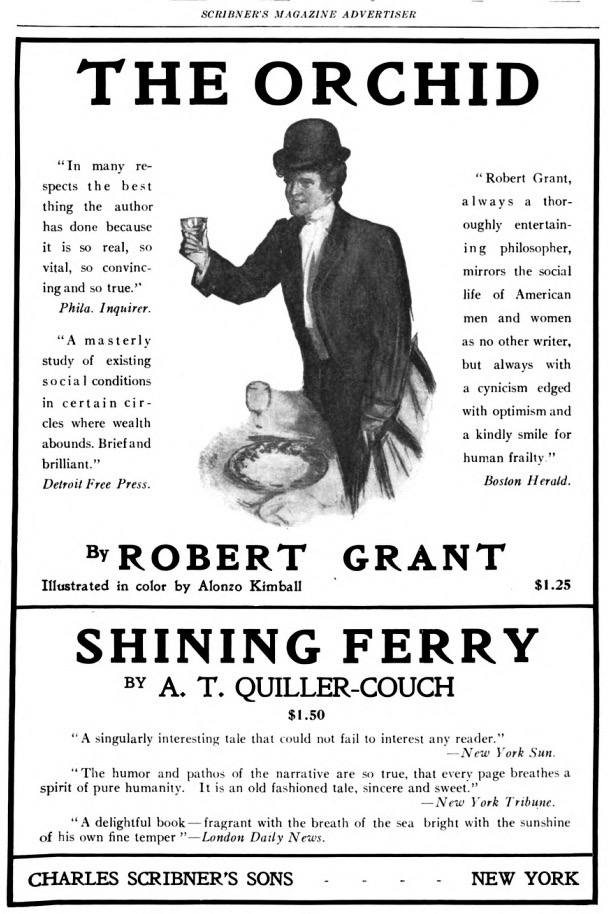
Advertisement in 1905 for The Orchid illustrated by Alonzo Kimball

- Novels
  - The Confessions of a Frivolous Girl (1880)
  - An Average Man (1884)
  - The King's Men, A Tale of To-Morrow (1884)
  - Face to Face (1886)
  - The Knave of Hearts (1886)
  - Jack Hall, or the School Days of an American Boy (1887)
  - The Reflections of a Married Man (1892)
  - The Opinions of a Philosopher (1893)
  - The Art of Living (1899)
  - Unleavened Bread (1900)
  - The Undercurrent (1904)
  - The Orchid (1905)
  - The Law-Breakers and Other Stories (1906)
  - The Chippendales (1909)
  - The High Priestess (1915)
  - The Bishop's Granddaughter (1925)
  - The Dark Horse (1931)
- Autobiography
  - Fourscore: An Autobiography (Boston: Houghton Mifflin Company, 1934)
- Drama
  - The Lambs: A Tragedy (Boston:James R. Osgood & Co, 1882)
