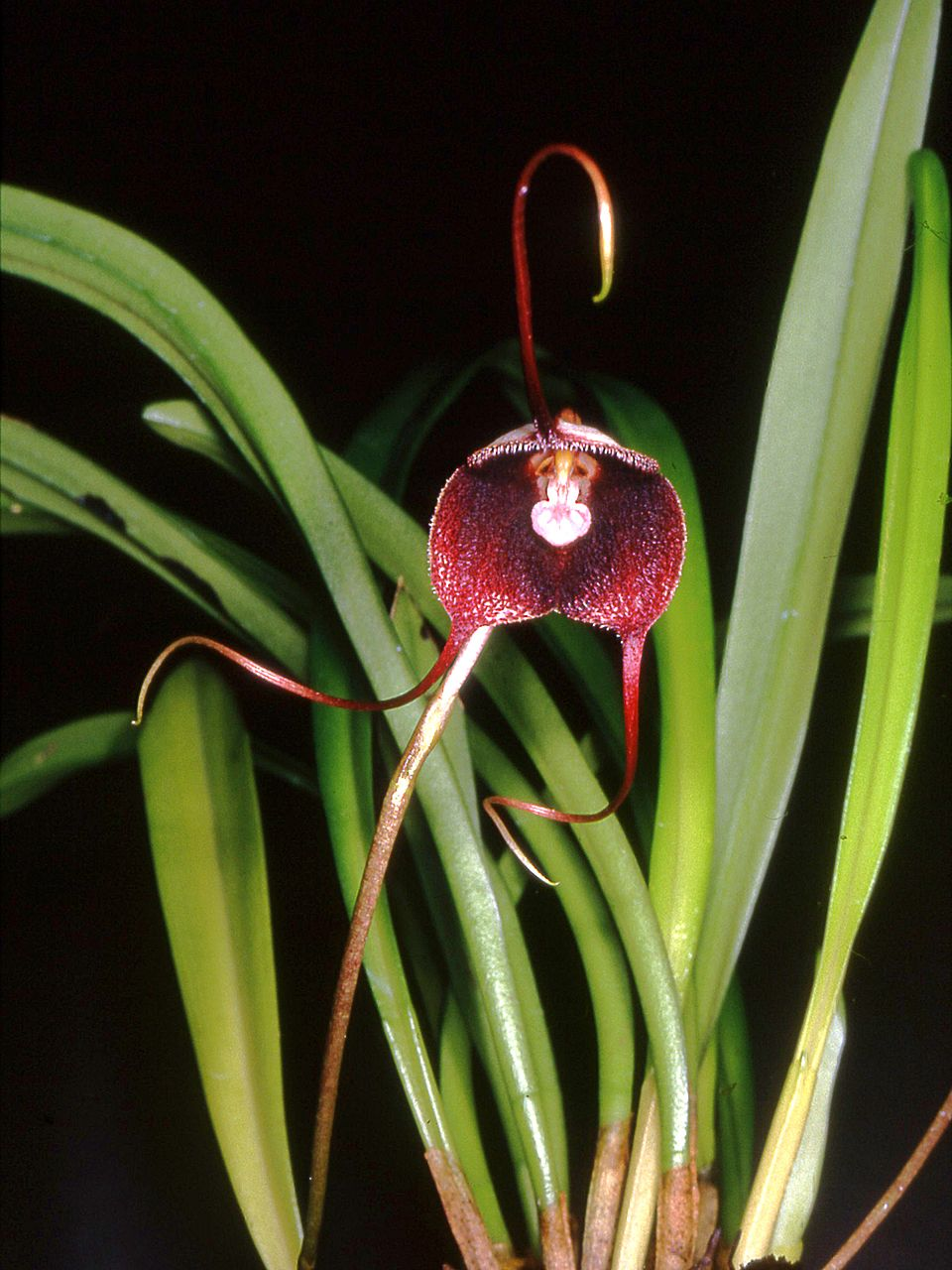

Scientific classification
- Kingdom: Plantae
- Clade: Tracheophytes
- Clade: Angiosperms
- Clade: Monocots
- Order: Asparagales
- Family: Orchidaceae
- Subfamily: Epidendroideae
- Genus: Dracula
- Species: D. benedictii

Binomial name
- Dracula benedictii (Rchb.f.) Luer

Synonyms
- Masdevallia benedictii Rchb.f. (Basionym); Masdevallia troglodytes E. Morren; Dracula troglodytes (E. Morren) Luer; Dracula hubeinii Luer; Dracula benedictii var. hubeinii (Luer) Hermans

= Dracula benedictii =

Species of orchid

Dracula benedictii is a species of orchid found in Cordillera Central and Cordillera Occidental, Colombia. It was named in honour of Benedict Roezl the noted Bohemian collector, who discovered this species.
