= The Orchid (novel) =

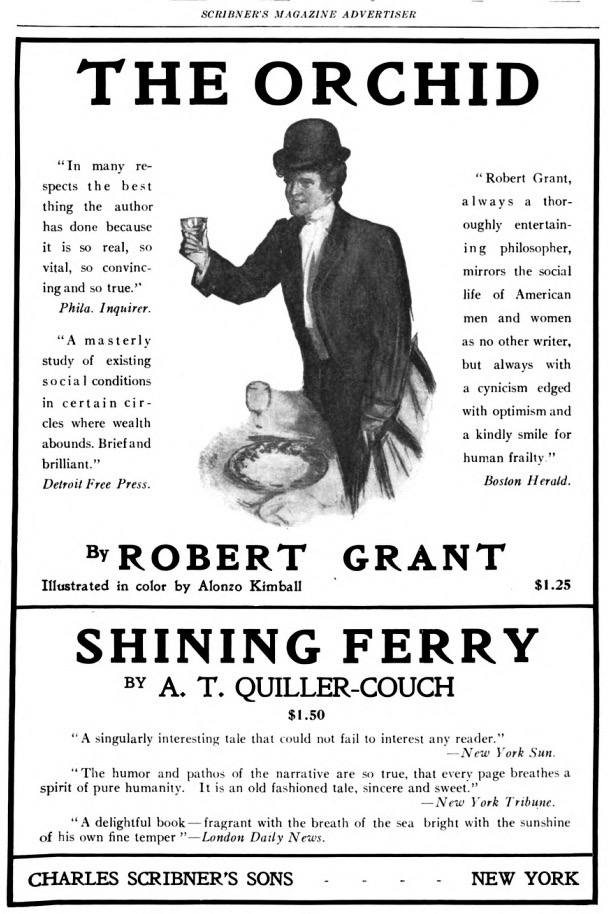
- Advertisement for the novel
- Author: Robert Grant
- Illustrator: Alonzo Kimball
- Publisher: Charles Scribner's Sons
- Publication date: 1905
- Publication place: New York
- Pages: 229

The Orchid is a 1905 novel by American writer Robert Grant.

== Plot introduction ==
Lydia Arnold, a headstrong young woman, marries Herbert Maxwell for his money. She eventually divorces for love and then sells her infant daughter back to her former husband to secure a two million dollar fortune.
