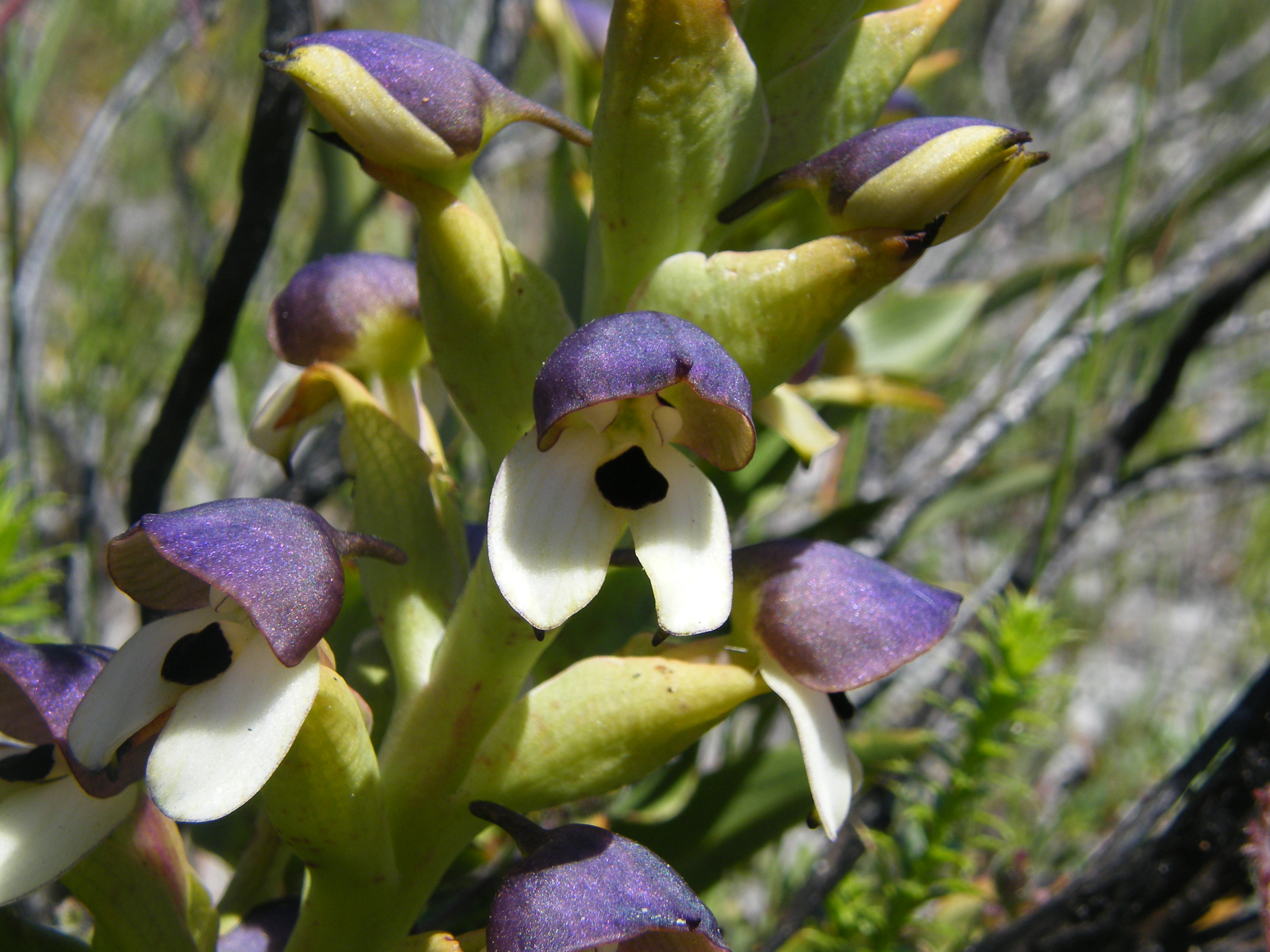

Scientific classification
- Kingdom: Plantae
- Clade: Tracheophytes
- Clade: Angiosperms
- Clade: Monocots
- Order: Asparagales
- Family: Orchidaceae
- Subfamily: Orchidoideae
- Genus: Disa
- Species: D. cornuta

Binomial name
- Disa cornuta (L.) Sw.

Synonyms
- Orchis cornuta L. (Basionym); Satyrium cornutum (L.) Thunb.; Gamaria cornuta (L.) Raf.; Schizodium cornutum (L.) Schltr.; Disa macrantha Sw.; Disa aemula Bolus; Disa cornuta var. aemula (Bolus) Kraenzl.

= Disa cornuta =

Species of orchid

Disa cornuta is a species of orchid found from Zimbabwe to South Africa.

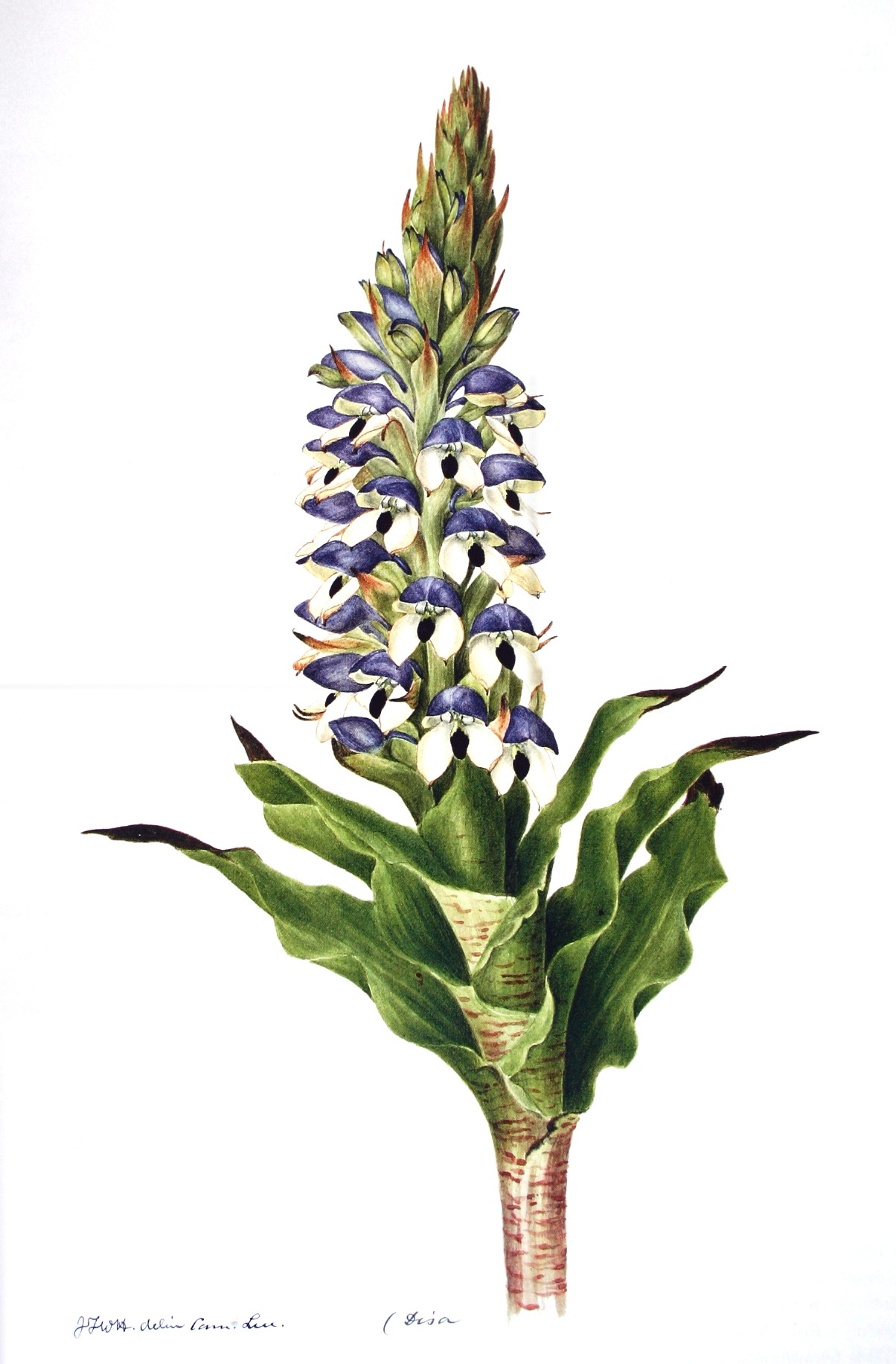
Disa cornuta (L.) Sw. by Margaret & John Herschel
