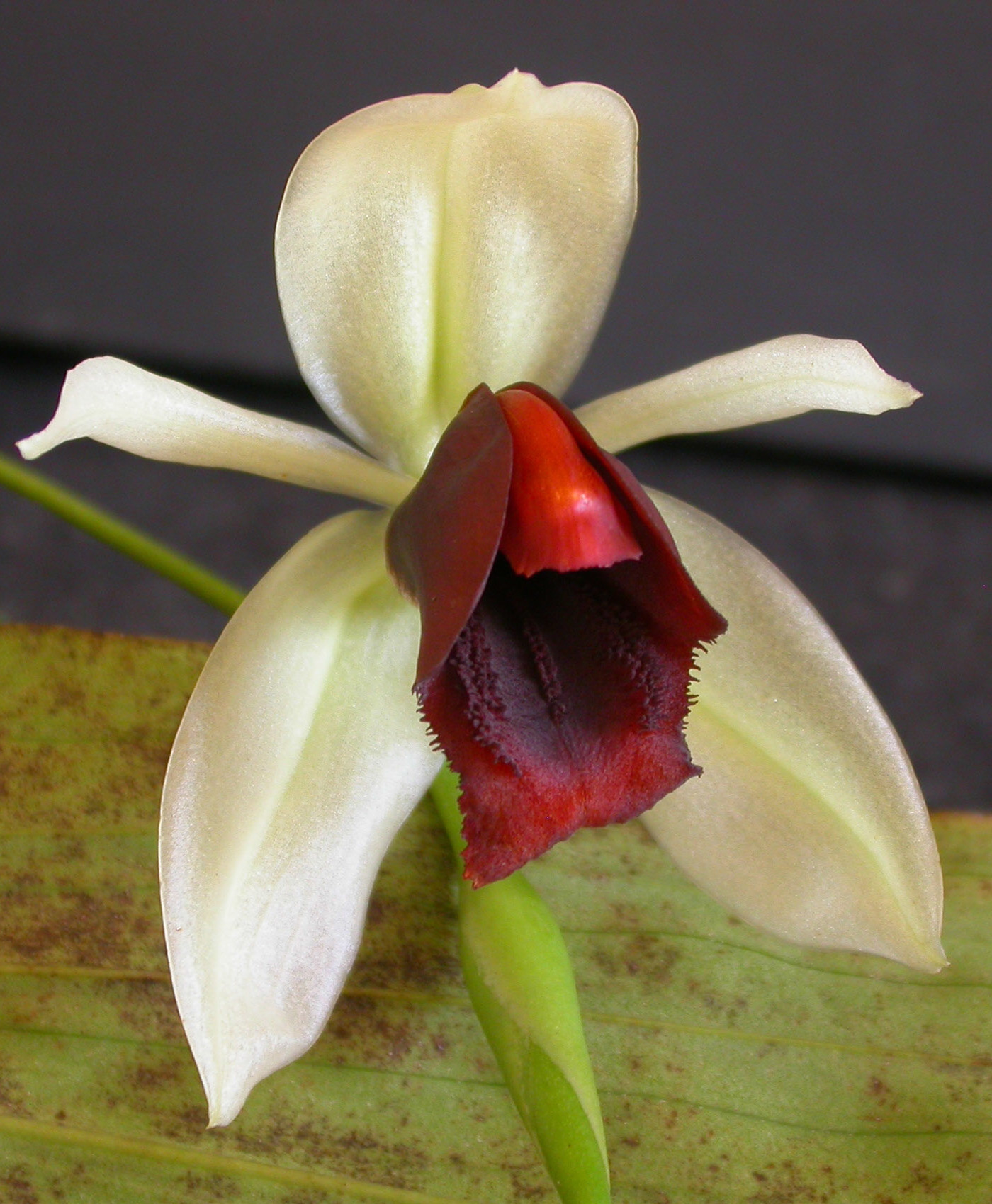

Scientific classification
- Kingdom: Plantae
- Clade: Tracheophytes
- Clade: Angiosperms
- Clade: Monocots
- Order: Asparagales
- Family: Orchidaceae
- Subfamily: Epidendroideae
- Tribe: Arethuseae
- Genus: Coelogyne
- Species: C. usitana

Binomial name
- Coelogyne usitana Roeth & O. Gruss (2001)

= Coelogyne usitana =

Species of orchid

Coelogyne usitana is a species of orchid discovered in the late 1990s. It was named in honour of the collector Villamor T. Usita, by Jürgen Röth and Olaf Gruss in the German orchid magazine Die Orchidee. It was discovered in central-east Mindanao, Philippines where it grows at elevations of about 800 metres on the horizontal branches of trees.

The inflorescence can bear 30 or more flowers over a long period of time, with only one or two blooms open at a time. The flowers are about 6cm in diameter and face the downward, possibly to shield the bloom from rain. The colour contrast in the flowers is rare in the genus.

Full plant
