= Patriarchate of Peć =

Patriarchate of Peć may refer to:

- Patriarchate of Peć (monastery), Serbian Orthodox monastery near the city of Peć
- Serbian Patriarchate of Peć, medieval Serbian Patriarchate, with seat at the Patriarchate of Peć Monastery, from 1346 to 1766

== See also ==
- Serbian Patriarchate (disambiguation)
