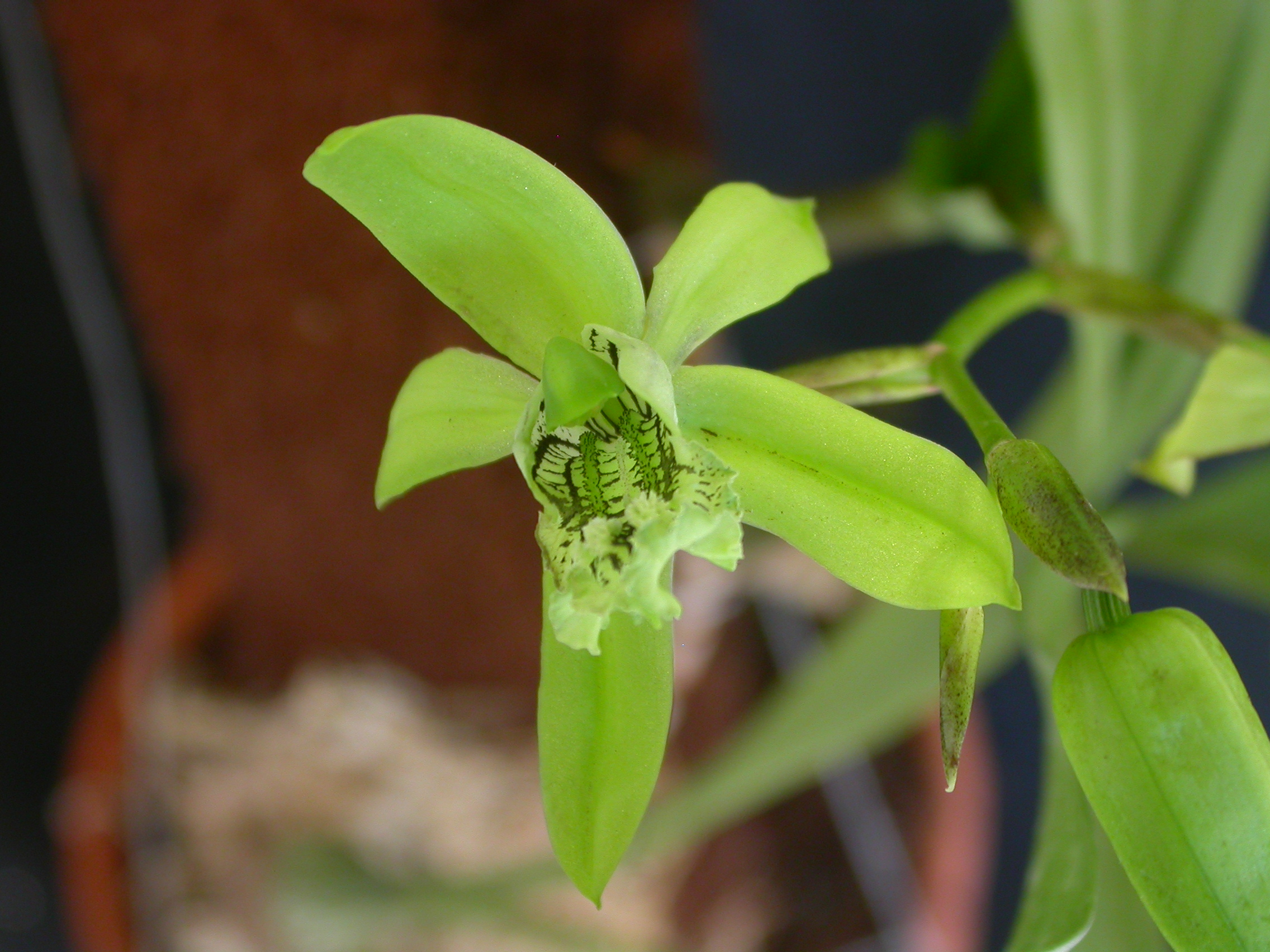

Scientific classification
- Kingdom: Plantae
- Clade: Embryophytes
- Clade: Tracheophytes
- Clade: Angiosperms
- Clade: Monocots
- Order: Asparagales
- Family: Orchidaceae
- Subfamily: Epidendroideae
- Tribe: Arethuseae
- Genus: Coelogyne
- Species: C. mayeriana

Binomial name
- Coelogyne mayeriana Rchb.f. (1877)

= Coelogyne mayeriana =

Species of orchid

Coelogyne mayeriana is a species of orchid. It occurs in Malaysia, Sumatra, Java and Borneo.
