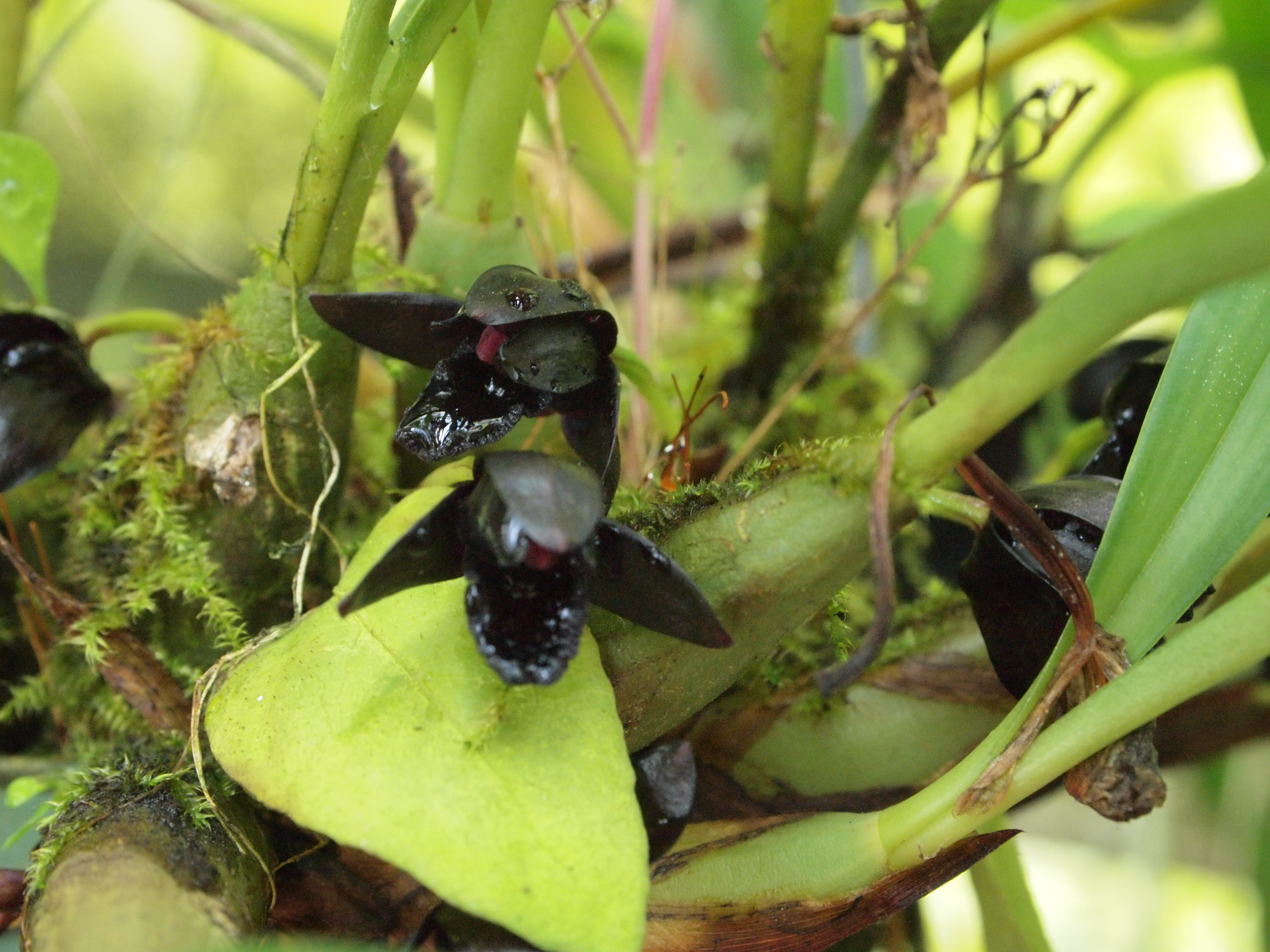

Scientific classification
- Kingdom: Plantae
- Clade: Tracheophytes
- Clade: Angiosperms
- Clade: Monocots
- Order: Asparagales
- Family: Orchidaceae
- Subfamily: Epidendroideae
- Genus: Maxillaria
- Species: M. schunkeana

Binomial name
- Maxillaria schunkeana Campacci & Kautsky

Synonyms
- Bolbidium schunkeanum (Campacci & Kautsky) J.M.H.Shaw; Brasiliorchis schunkeana (Campacci & Kautsky) R.B.Singer, S.Koehler & Carnevali

= Maxillaria schunkeana =

Species of orchid

Maxillaria schunkeana (syn. Brasiliorchis schunkeana) is a species of orchid. The colors of its flower are very close to black, but it is actually a very dark purple-red, giving the impression of a black flower.

== Distribution ==
The plant is found in the rainforest in Espírito Santo State, Brazil, at elevations of 600 to 700 meters. Primarily found in forest biomes, this genus is easily diagnosed by its sulcate to ridged, bifoliate pseudobulbs and its long-lasting campanulate.

== Bibliography ==
- Singer, Rodrigo B.; Koehler, Samantha; Carnevali, German (2007). "Brasiliorchis: A New Genus for the Maxillaria picta Alliance (Orchidaceae, Maxillariinae)". Novon. 17 (1): 91–99. doi:10.3417/1055-3177(2007)17[91:BANGFT]2.0.CO;2. S2CID 86568433.
