= Orchids (album) =

Studio album by Astral
- Released: January 24, 2003
- Studio: Stout Recording Studio in Oakland, California
- Genre: Dream pop

Orchids is the debut album by dream pop band Astral. It contains ten songs and was released in 2003. The title track is a highly melodic instrumental slightly reminiscent of space rock. The record was mixed at Stout Recording Studio in Oakland, California, and was engineered by Randy Burk, who had worked with Swingin' Utters. The album reached No. 119 on the CMJ 200.

== Track listing ==
1. Barreling (3:09)
2. Blinder (4:35)
3. In Heaven (3:22)
4. Under Lock and Key (3:55)
5. Turn Me Around (2:41)
6. Slumber (4:54)
7. Orchids (3:01)
8. Last Light (4:05)
9. Raining Down (3:29)
10. Forbidden Kiss (5:19)
