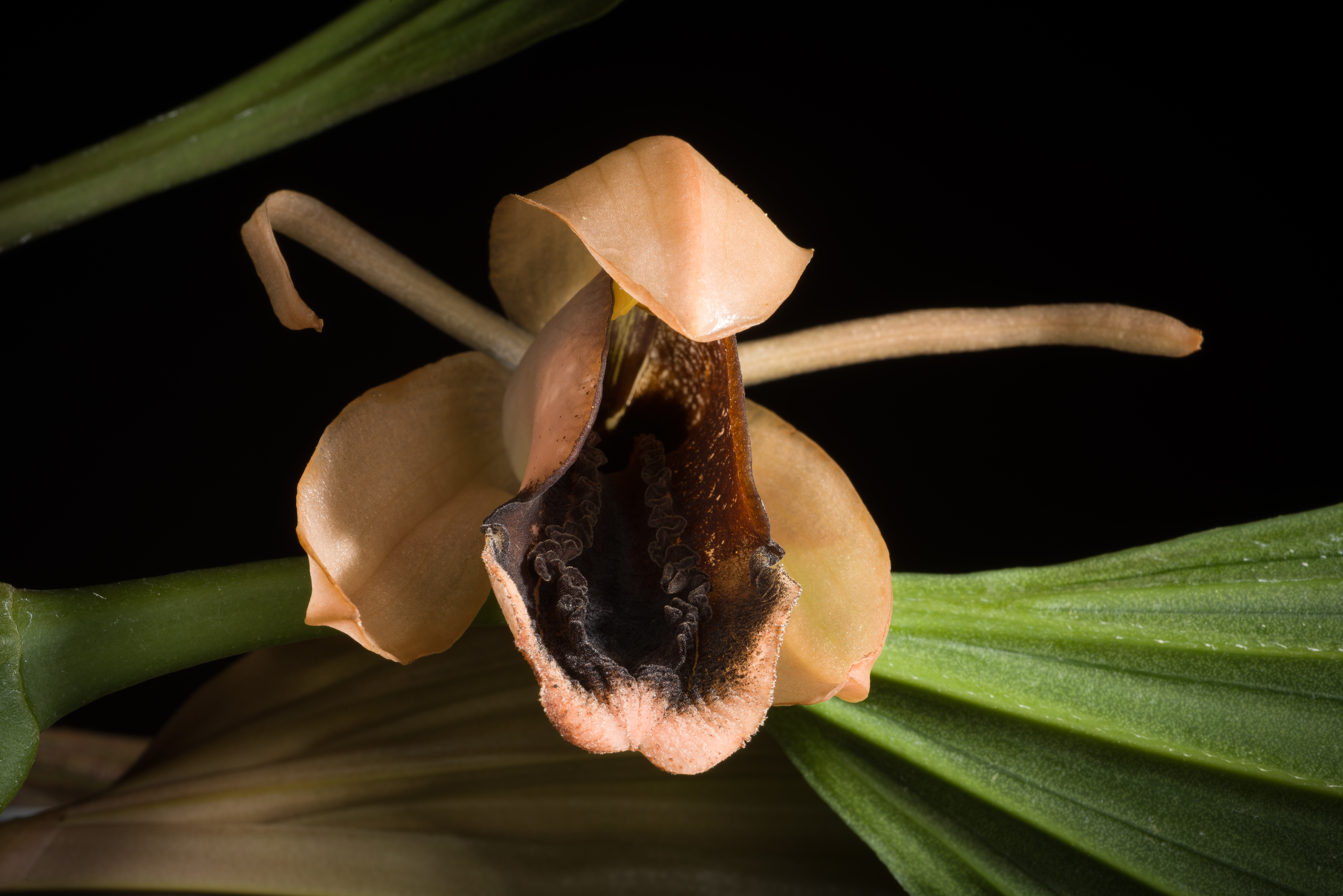

Scientific classification
- Kingdom: Plantae
- Clade: Embryophytes
- Clade: Tracheophytes
- Clade: Spermatophytes
- Clade: Angiosperms
- Clade: Monocots
- Order: Asparagales
- Family: Orchidaceae
- Subfamily: Epidendroideae
- Tribe: Arethuseae
- Genus: Coelogyne
- Species: C. xyrekes

Binomial name
- Coelogyne xyrekes Ridl. (1915)

Synonyms
- Coelogyne xanthoglossa Ridl. (1915)

= Coelogyne xyrekes =

Species of orchid

Coelogyne xyrekes is a species of orchid.
