= Serbian Archbishopric =

Serbian Archbishopric or Archbishopric of Serbia may refer to:

- Archbishopric of Žiča and Peć (1219–1346), name of the medieval Serbian Orthodox Church as an autocephalous archbishopric
- Metropolitanate of Karlovci (1708–1848), autonomous Serbian Orthodox archbishopric, in the territory of the Habsburgh monarchy, turned into a patriarchate in 1848
- Metropolitanate of Belgrade (1831–1920), autonomous Serbian Orthodox archbishopric, in the territory of Principality, then Kingdom of Serbia, merged into the unified Serbian Orthodox Church 1920
- Orthodox Ohrid Archbishopric (2002–2023), autonomous jurisdiction of the Serbian Orthodox Church, in the territory of North Macedonia.

== See also ==
- Serbian Patriarchate (disambiguation)
- Archbishopric of Ohrid (disambiguation)
