= Unleavened Bread =

1900 novel by Robert Grant

- Unleavened bread. [a novel]
- Author: Robert Grant
- Language: English
- Genre: novel
- Publisher: Charles Scribner's Sons
- Publication date: 1900
- Publication place: United States

Unleavened Bread is a 1900 novel by American writer Robert Grant, and one of the best selling books of that year.

== Plot introduction ==
A businessman's selfish wife forces her way into upper society.

== Play ==
The novel was also adapted into a Broadway play in 1901, directed by Leo Ditrichstein. The "thoroughly detestable" part of Selma White in the play was played by Elizabeth Tyree.
