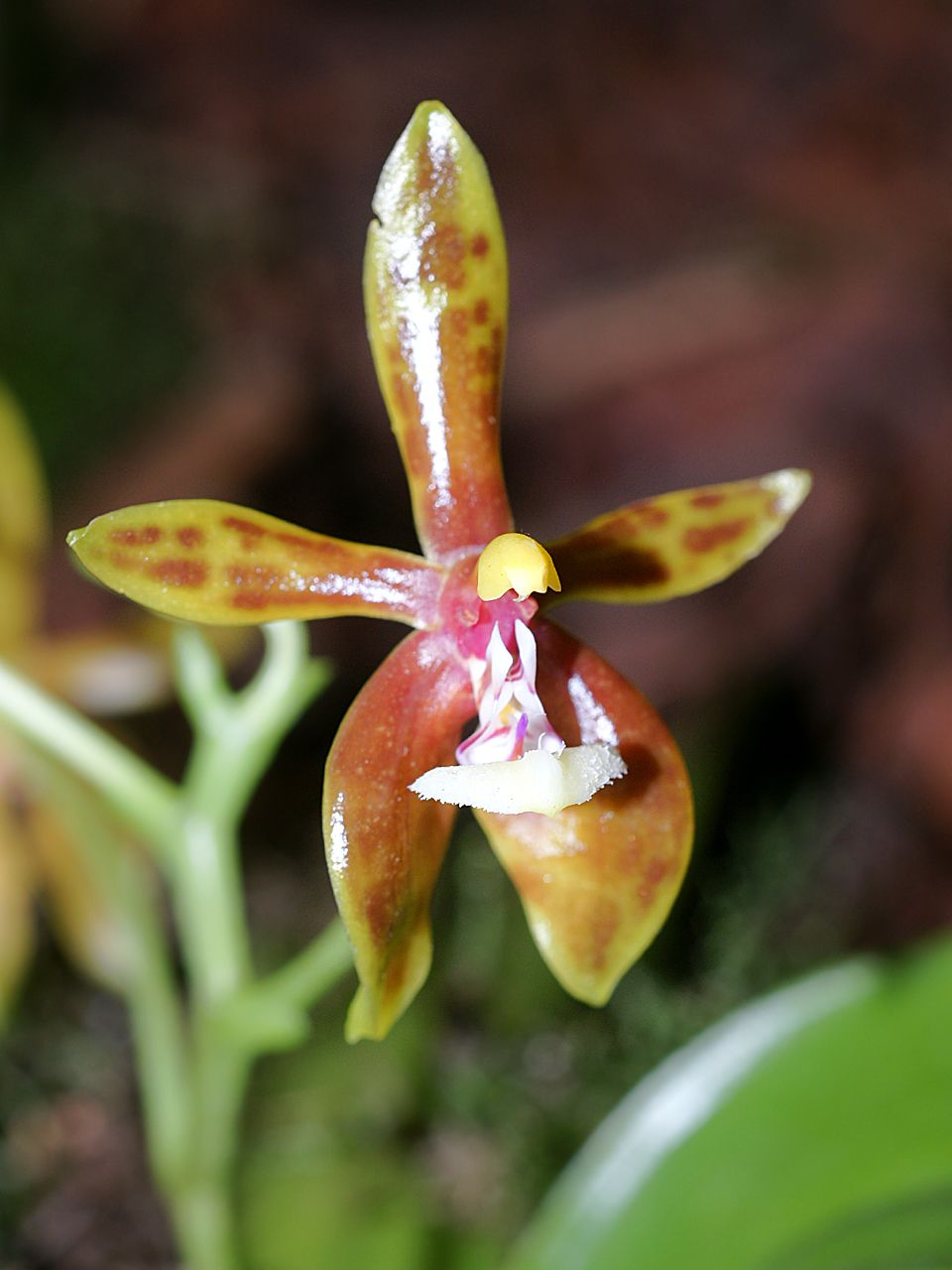
- Flower of Phalaenopsis mannii

Scientific classification
- Kingdom: Plantae
- Clade: Tracheophytes
- Clade: Angiosperms
- Clade: Monocots
- Order: Asparagales
- Family: Orchidaceae
- Subfamily: Epidendroideae
- Genus: Phalaenopsis
- Species: P. mannii

Binomial name
- Phalaenopsis mannii Rchb.f.

Synonyms
- Phalaenopsis boxallii Rchb.f.; Polychilos mannii (Rchb.f.) Shim; Phalaenopsis mannii f. flava Christenson

= Phalaenopsis mannii =

Species of orchid

Phalaenopsis mannii is a species of orchid found from eastern Nepal to southern Yunnan.
