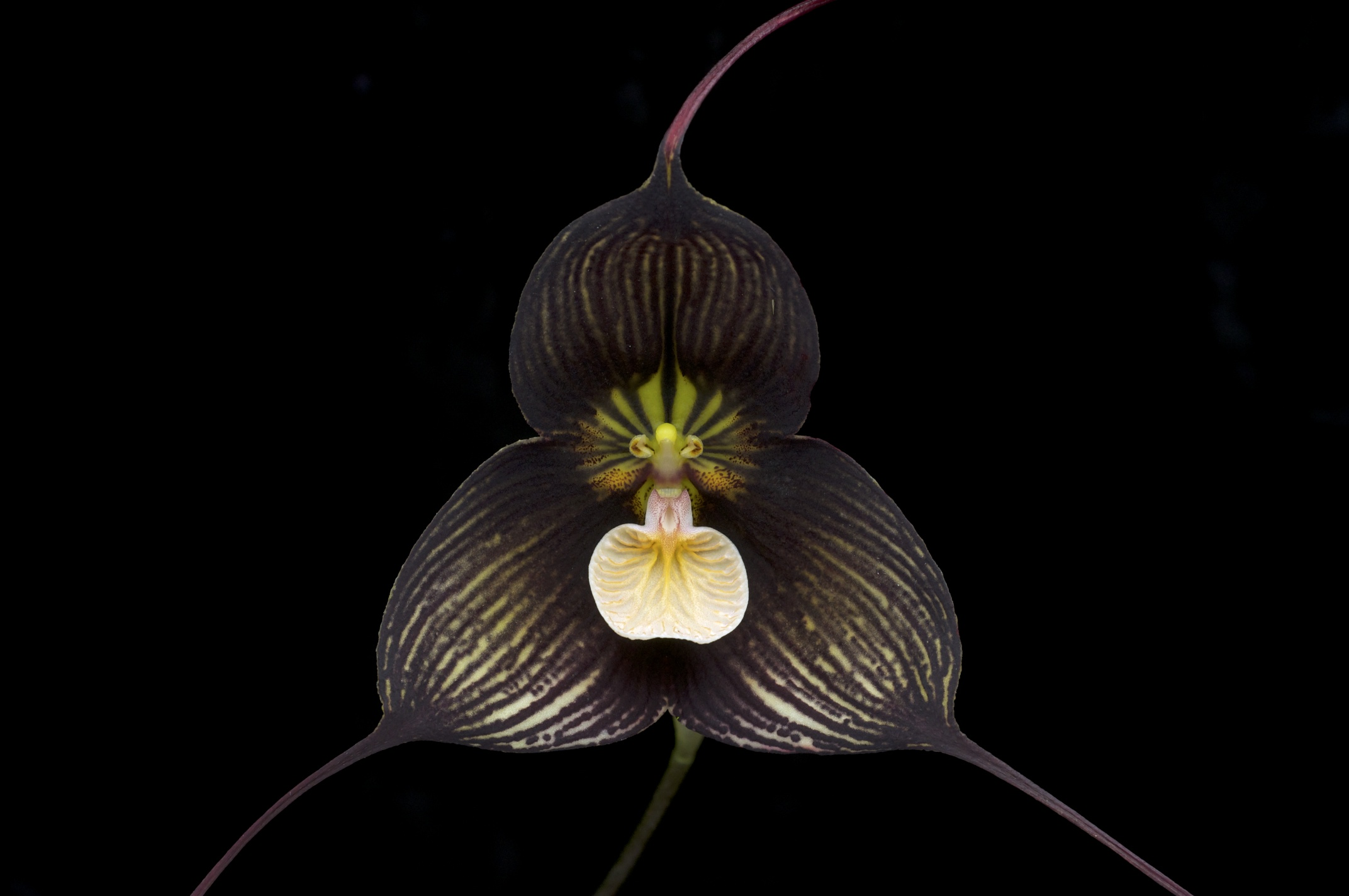

Conservation status
- CITES Appendix II (CITES)

Scientific classification
- Kingdom: Plantae
- Clade: Tracheophytes
- Clade: Angiosperms
- Clade: Monocots
- Order: Asparagales
- Family: Orchidaceae
- Subfamily: Epidendroideae
- Genus: Dracula
- Species: D. vampira

Binomial name
- Dracula vampira (Luer) Luer

Synonyms
- Masdevallia vampira Luer

= Dracula vampira =

Species of orchid

Dracula vampira is an epiphytic orchid species, endemic to Ecuador.

== Description ==
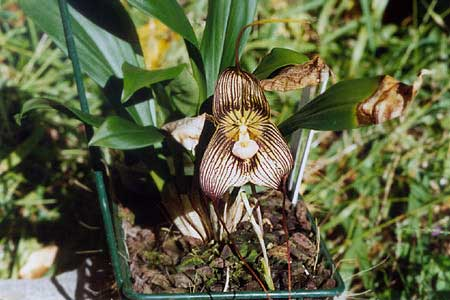
A Dracula vampira orchid

The orchid has large distinctive flowers; the sepals are rounded with the top corner pulled into a thin tail, which may extend up to 11 cm in length. Although green in colour, the sepals are covered by numerous blackish purple veins and the tails are almost completely black. The large sepals dwarf the petals and lip of the flower, which are white in colour and marked with purple and pinkish veins respectively. Dracula vampira is a large epiphyte, meaning that it does not grow in soil, it has many stems; the erect leaves are between 15 and 28 cm long. The generic name of this species - Dracula means little dragon, refers to the flower resembling a hooded vampire.

== Taxonomy ==
Dracula vampira was scientifically described and named Masdevallia vampira by Carlyle A. Luer in 1978. Later the same year he moved it to the new genus, Dracula, which he also named.

== Distribution ==
Dracula vampira is endemic to Ecuador in South America being found only on the slopes of Mount Pichincha. It is found between 1900 and 2200 metres above sea level, where it is fairly locally abundant.

== Ecology ==
As an epiphyte D. vampira does not grow in soil, instead it grows on the lower sections of trees on the forested mountainside; many plants may accumulate on damp, leaf litter.

== Conservation ==
Dracula vampira was classified as Vulnerable on the 1997 IUCN Red List of Threatened Plants, (although this status no longer applies) and listed on Appendix II of CITES, together with almost all orchids. It is popular in cultivation for its extremely dramatic, large flowers.
