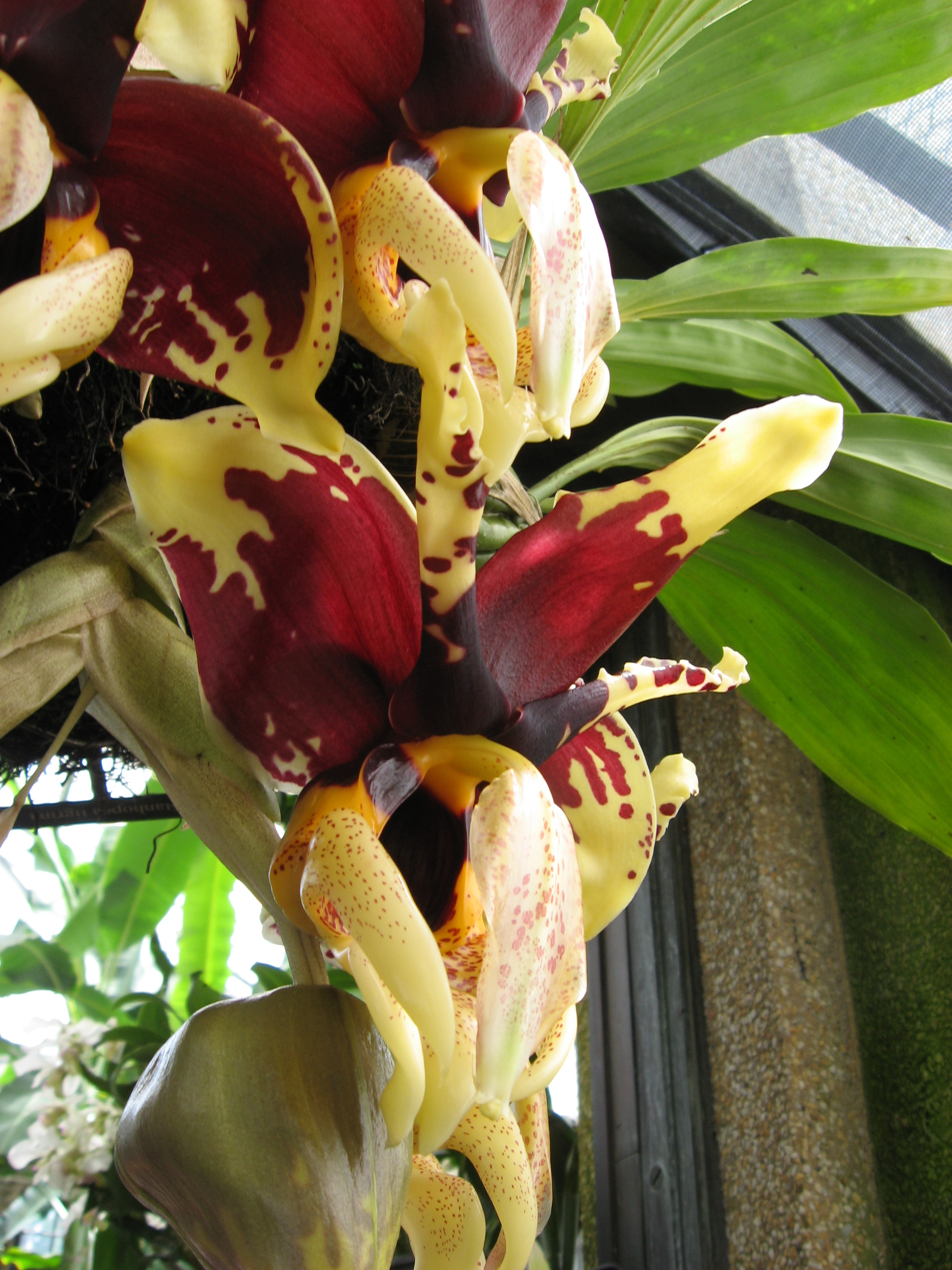

Scientific classification
- Kingdom: Plantae
- Clade: Tracheophytes
- Clade: Angiosperms
- Clade: Monocots
- Order: Asparagales
- Family: Orchidaceae
- Subfamily: Epidendroideae
- Genus: Stanhopea
- Species: S. tigrina

Binomial name
- Stanhopea tigrina J.Frost

Synonyms
- Stanhopea expansa P.N.Don; Epidendrum fragrantissimum Sessé & Moç.

= Stanhopea tigrina =

Species of orchid

Stanhopea tigrina is a species of plant in the family Orchidaceae. It is endemic to Mexico.
