= The Black Orchid (nightclub) =

The Black Orchid was an upscale Chicago nightclub that flourished in the mid to late 1950s where, according to print media critics, Johnny Mathis got his first big break. The club opened in 1949. The Black Orchid was declared bankrupt in July 1959, closed, and never reopened. The club was located at Rush and Ontario Streets in Chicago's Near Northside. The club was frequented by celebrities that included Tony Bennett and Hugh Hefner.

== Owners ==
The founding owner, Al Greenfield (né Albert Melvin Greenfield; 1908–1984) sold the club in 1956 to Paul David Raffles (1932–1973), Pat Fontecchio (aka Patsy, né Patrick Frank Fontecchio; 1914–1994), and William (Bill) Doherty. Greenfield sold it so that he could be near his ex-wife, Gertrude Niesen, whom he married July 19, 1943, and remarried in the 1950s — and remained married to her until her death in 1975. Raffles, Fontecchio, and Doherty also owned The Cloisters Inn at 900 Rush Street.

Before founding The Black Orchid, Greenfield had been partners with Milton Schwartz in four cocktail lounges: The Rhumba Casino (opened 1941) at 222 North State Street, The Capital Lounge at 167 North State Street, The Hollywood Show Lounge at 87 West Randolph Street, and The Brass Rail at 62 West Randolph Street. Schwartz and a partner, Ralph Mitchell, of Ralph Mitchell & Associates, had been pioneers in the Chicago night club business from 1941, through the 1950s.

Before co-owning The Black Orchid, Patsy Fontecchio had been a nightclub MC, originally in his hometown of Hurley, Wisconsin.

=== Bankruptcy ===
The media reported that Raffles, Fontecchio, and Doherty were the owners when bankrupt proceedings began in 1959.

An Associated Press article reported that three waiters — Gorge Ellis, Henry Mallick (1909–2003), and Mario Bastiani (né Salvadore Mario Bastiani; 1917–1988) — triggered the proceedings by petitioning the U.S. District Court for the Eastern District of Illinois to declare the club bankrupt. They contended that they were owed wages of $1,847.

A month before the bankruptcy proceedings, Billboard published that Ruffles and his wife were giving up the night club business to live in Los Angeles. Federal and Illinois state court records reflect that Black Orchid, Inc., an Illinois corporation, Gertrude Niesen, Albert Greenfield, and others, were parties of a lawsuit involving tax liens, debtors claims on escrow accounts, and priority of Federal tax liens over state tax liens.

== Managers ==
Benny Dunn (1913–1989), "King of Rush Street," a former comic, operated the Black Orchid while Greenfield was the owner. Dunn went on to be a publicist and influential staffer for Hugh Hefner and Playboy.

== Current and former Chicago clubs with the same name ==
- There was a Black Orchid Club at 69th and Racine in the 1960s.
- A new Black Orchid in Chicago in Piper's Alley at 230 West North Avenue — unrelated to this article — opened in 1999, but closed in 2008.

== Theme song ==
In 1955, a song written by Royce Chester Swain, DDS (1917–2012) — "Black Orchid" (© 1955) — was made the theme song of the Chicago club bearing the same name.

== 1950s jazz clubs in the Loop ==
- Blue Note (opened 1949, closed 1960), owned and operated by Frank Holzfiend (1899–1975)

In 1953, the Blue Note moved to 3 North Clark Street

- Hi Note (opened 1951), owned by Marty Denenberg
- Capitol Lounge (opened 1934, closed 1954), owned and operated by Milt Schwartz & Al Greenfield
- Liberty Inn, North Clark Street
- New Apex Club (before 1926, known as Nest; known earlier as Club Avadere) North Clark Street

The original location was at 300 East 35th Street, Chicago's South Side — that location was closed in the 1930 after a police raid for violating prohibition laws

- Club Silhouette (opened in the 1930s; closed in the 1950s), Howard Street, Rogers Park, owned and operated by Jack Terman (né Jacob Terman; 1897–1958), later, his son, Allen E. Terman (né Allen Marvin Terman; 1920–1998)
- The Airliner Club, State Street
- Band Box, Randolph Street, owned and operated by Ralph Mitchell, Milt Schwartz, and Al Greenfield

== See also ==
- List of jazz venues
