= Archbishopric of Ohrid (disambiguation) =

The Archbishopric of Ohrid is a former Eastern Orthodox Church body in 1019–1767.

Archbishopric of Ohrid or Archdiocese of Ohrid may also refer to:

- Macedonian Orthodox Church – Archdiocese of Ohrid (est. 1967), an autocephalous Eastern Orthodox church in North Macedonia
- Orthodox Ohrid Archbishopric (2002–2023), was an autonomous archbishopric under the jurisdiction of the Serbian Orthodox Church
- Roman Catholic Archdiocese of Ohrid (ca. 1300–1700), a former Roman Catholic archdiocese, now a titular see

Archbishop of Ohrid may also refer to:

- Archbishop of Ohrid, title of the primate of the Archbishopric of Ohrid (1019–1767)
- Archbishop of Ohrid and Macedonia, title of the primate of the Macedonian Orthodox Church – Ohrid Archbishopric (est. 1967)
- Archbishop of Ohrid and Metropolitan of Skopje, title of the primate of the Orthodox Ohrid Archbishopric, part of the Serbian Orthodox Church (2002–2023)

== See also ==
- Ohrid (disambiguation)
- Archbishop (disambiguation)
- Serbian Archbishopric (disambiguation)
