= Lus. =

Lus. is an abbreviation that can refer to:

- lusus naturae, botanical term meaning 'sport of nature'
- Ludisia, a genus of orchids abbreviated as Lus.

== See also ==
- LUS (disambiguation)
