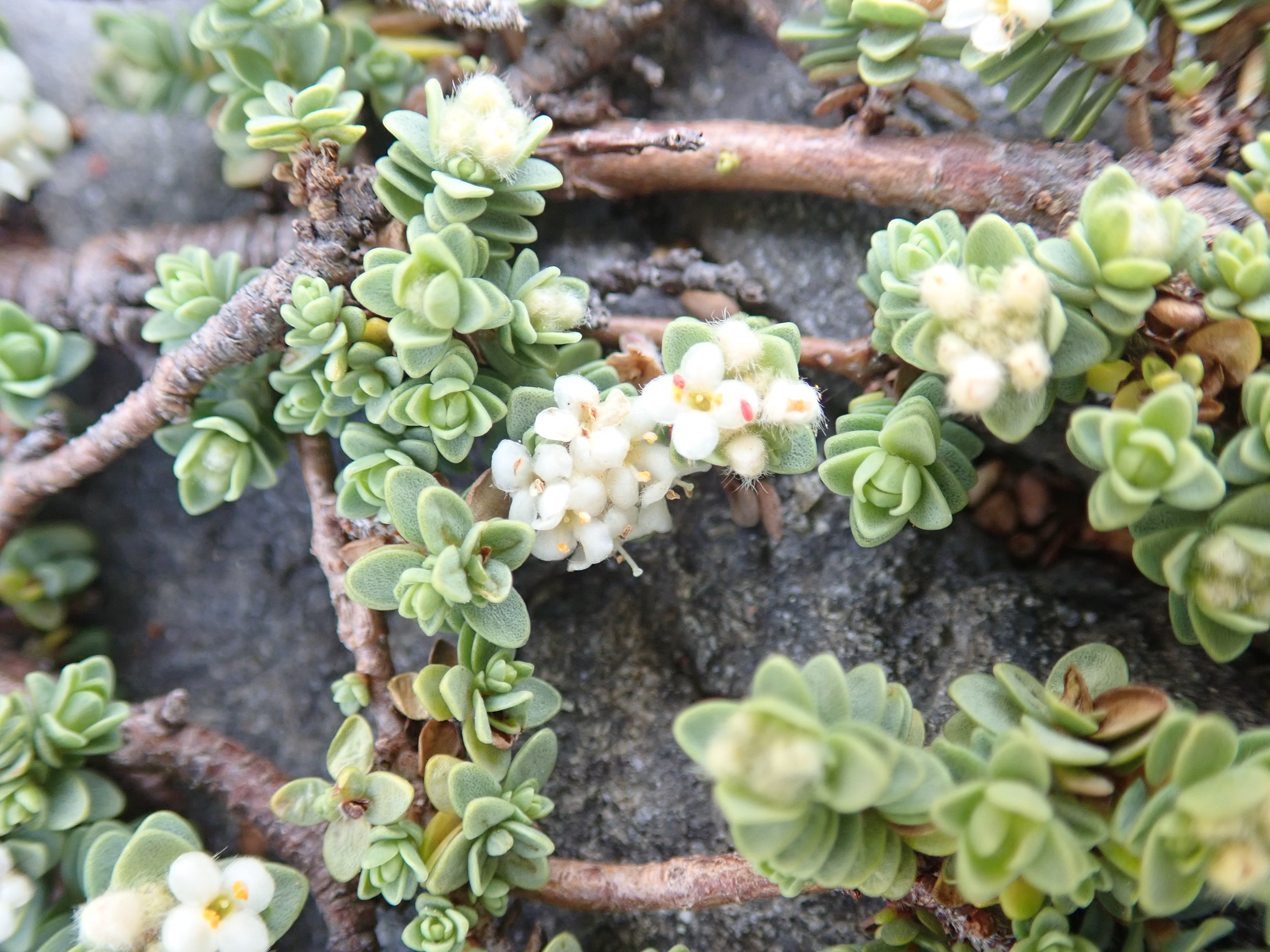
- Foliage and flowers
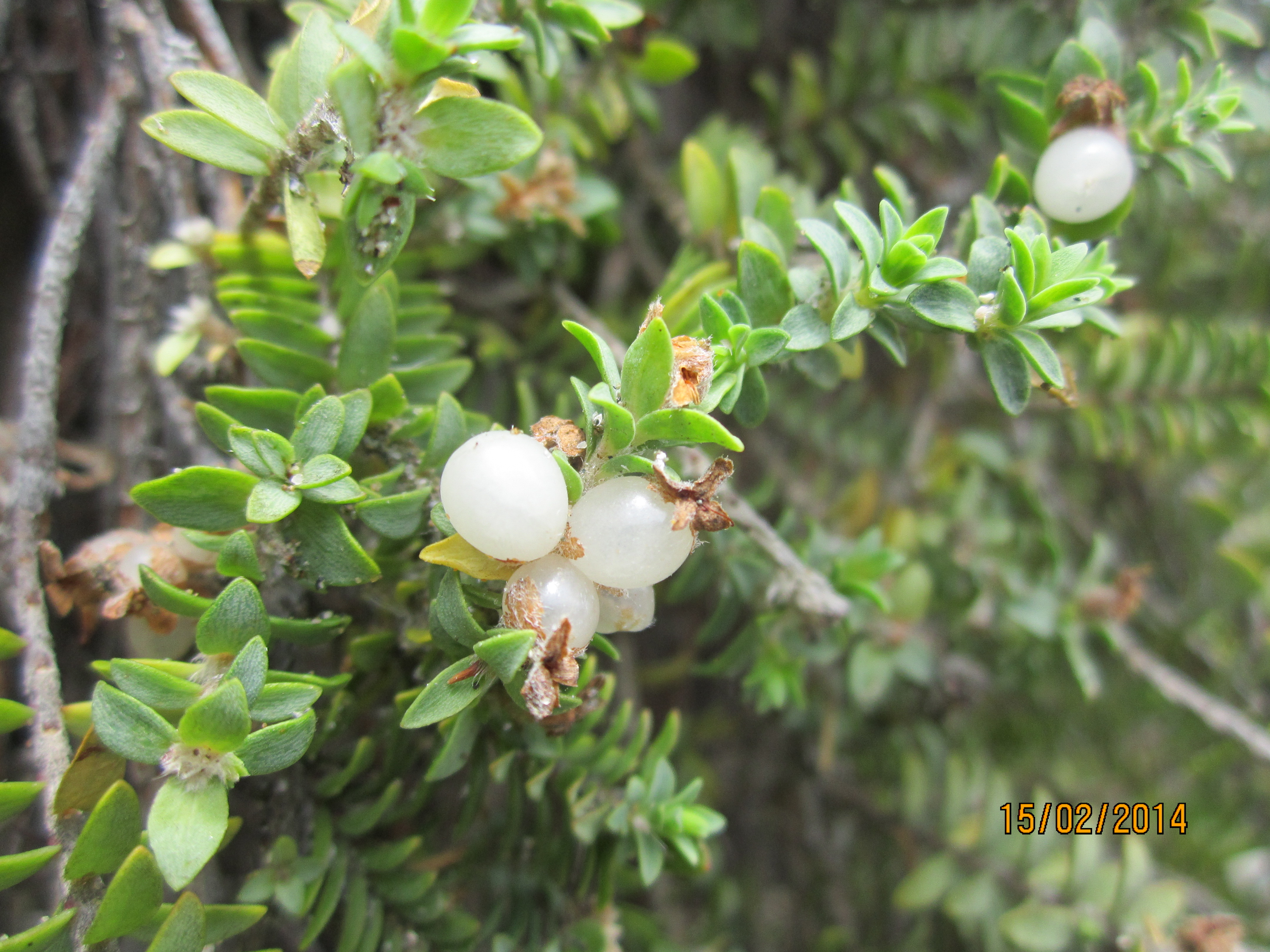
- Fruit

Scientific classification
- Kingdom: Plantae
- Clade: Tracheophytes
- Clade: Angiosperms
- Clade: Eudicots
- Clade: Rosids
- Order: Malvales
- Family: Thymelaeaceae
- Genus: Pimelea
- Species: P. urvilleana

Binomial name
- Pimelea urvilleana A.Rich.

Synonyms
- Banksia urvilleana (A.Rich.) Kuntze; Gymnococca microcarpa Fisch. & C.A.Mey.

= Pimelea urvilleana =

Species of shrub

Pimelea urvilleana is a ground spreading shrub in the Thymelaeaceae family. There are two intraspecifics: Pimelea urvilleana subsp. nesica, and Pimelea urvilleana subsp. urvilleana.

== Description ==
Pimelea urvilleana subsp. urvilleana is a small prostrate shrub, with stout, flexible stems up to 30 cm long. The branchlets are covered with dense matted white hair. The older stems are grey brown and slightly hairy. The decussate leaves are usually distichous. and flat or slightly keeled. There are many stomata on the adaxial surface, but few to none on the abaxial surface. The tips are obtuse. The inflorescences have 5-7 white flowers, which are hairy on the outside. This subspecies has only been found in the Auckland region and is relatively rare.

Pimelea urvilleana subsp. nesica differs in having paler and larger green leaves which are not keeled and less hairy branchlets, than subspecies urvilleana. Pimelea urvilleana subsp. nesica is found in the islands east of Auckland and Coromandel.

== Distribution ==
Pimelea urvilleana is found in New Zealand, on the North Island and thought to be extinct on the South Island.

== Taxonomy ==
It was first described in 1832 by Achille Richard, but was redescribed in 2009 by Colin James Burrows when the two subspecies were differentiated and P. urvilleana subsp. nesica was erected.

== Conservation status ==
In both 2004 and 2008, the subspecies urvilleana was assessed as "Not Threatened", and in 2012 was declared "Data Defiicient" but the 2018 assessment declared it "Not Threatened". The subspecies nesica was declared "Not Threatened" in 2009 and 2012, but in 2018 was declared "Data Deficient" under the New Zealand Threat Classification System.
