= Jewel orchid =

Jewel orchid is a common name which may refer to any orchid grown for its leaves rather than its flowers, including:

- Anoectochilus
  - Anoectochilus sandvicensis, Hawaii jewel orchid
- Dossinia
- Goodyera
- Ludisia
  - Ludisia discolor, jewel orchid
- Macodes

Note that these are all in the subtribe Goodyerinae.

== See also ==
- Orchidaceae#Leaves
