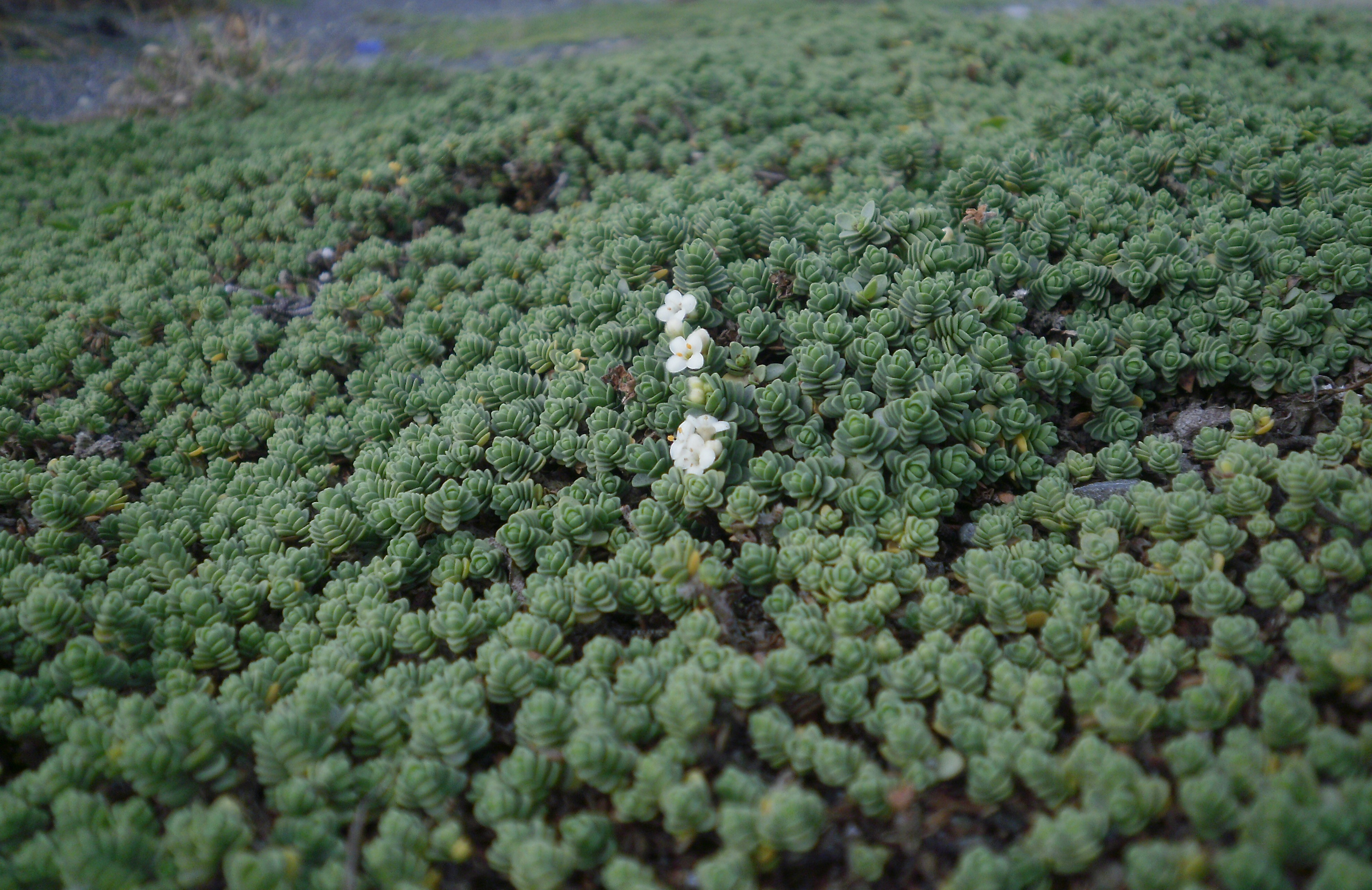

Scientific classification
- Kingdom: Plantae
- Clade: Tracheophytes
- Clade: Angiosperms
- Clade: Eudicots
- Clade: Rosids
- Order: Malvales
- Family: Thymelaeaceae
- Genus: Pimelea
- Species: P. urvilleana A.Rich.
- Subspecies: P. u. subsp. urvilleana

Trinomial name
- Pimelea urvilleana subsp. urvilleana

= Pimelea urvilleana subsp. urvilleana =

Subspecies of shrub

Pimelea urvilleana subsp. urvilleana, commonly known as pinatoro, is a ground spreading shrub native to New Zealand.
