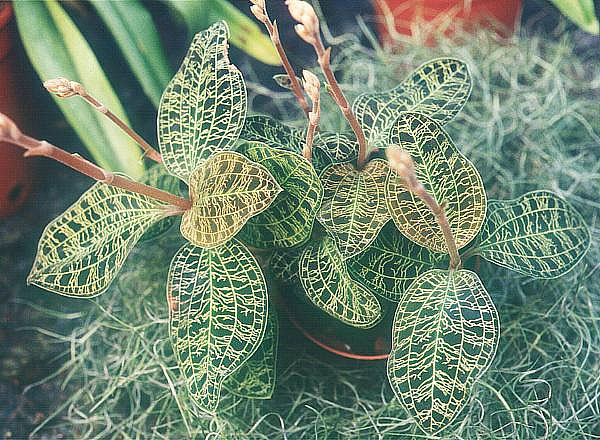
- Representative specimen of Macodes petola with attractive dark green, striated foliage

Scientific classification
- Kingdom: Plantae
- Clade: Tracheophytes
- Clade: Angiosperms
- Clade: Monocots
- Order: Asparagales
- Family: Orchidaceae
- Subfamily: Orchidoideae
- Tribe: Cranichideae
- Genus: Macodes
- Species: M. petola

Binomial name
- Macodes petola (Blume) Lindl., 1840

= Macodes petola =

Species of orchid

Macodes petola (previously Neottia petola) is a species of jewel orchid endemic to Southeast Asia including in Malaysia, New Guinea, Vanuatu, the Philippines and Sumatra. Flowers from this species are small, with red-brown petals with a yellow edge and white lip and appear in the winter months. Unlike the flower, the foliage on this plant is ornate and renders this plant of interest to botanical collectors. However, this plant is currently considered vulnerable (CITES status II) with restricted trade due to risk of over collection and use as a stimulant in Borneo traditional herbal medicine. M. petola is found growing under varying conditions in the wild. The plant can be found growing at heights between 300-1600m above sea level typically in forest habitats with high humidity.

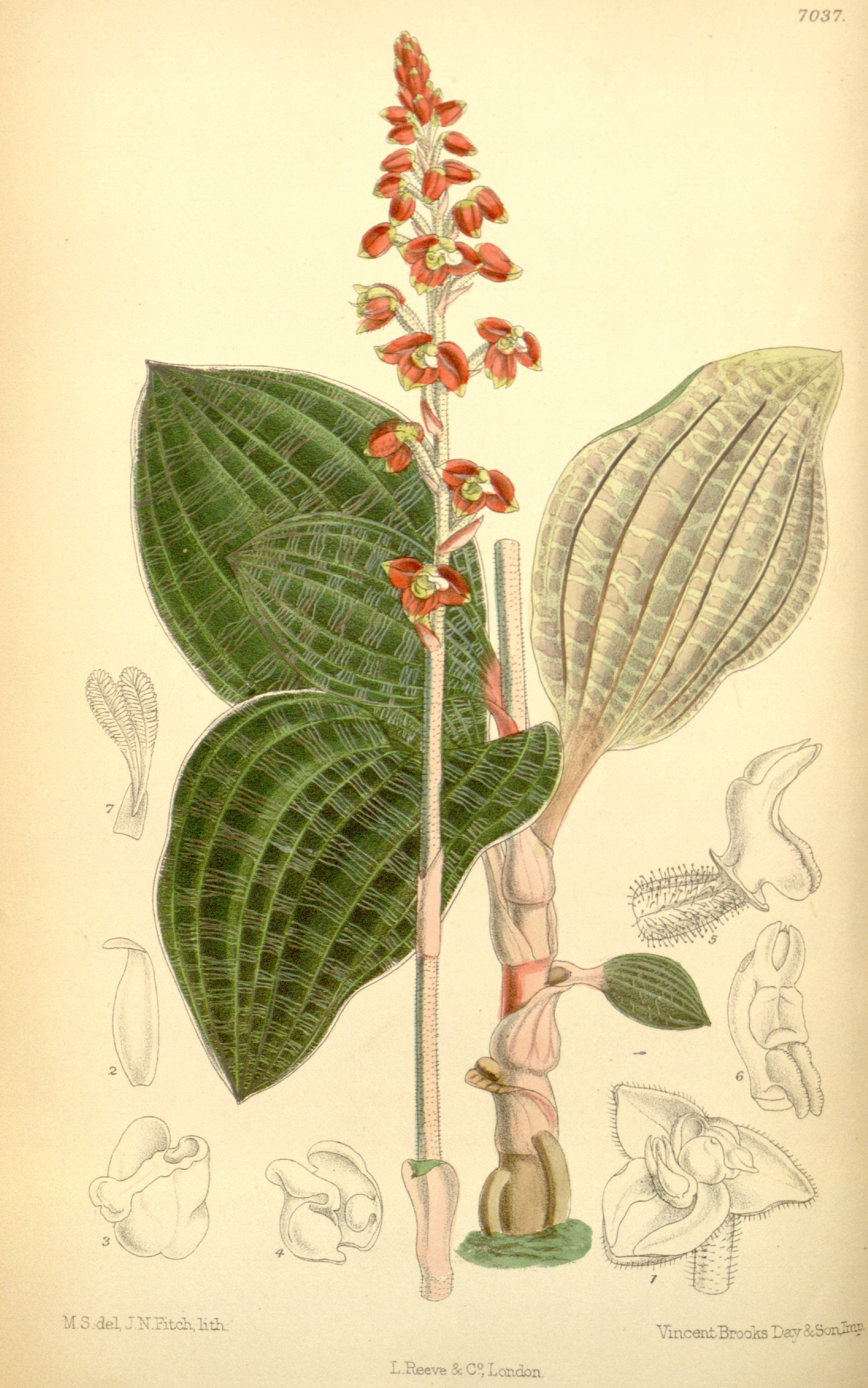
Botanical illustration of foliage and flower from Macodes petola

== Care and propagation ==
In cultivation, M. petola requires diffuse, indirect light and moderate to high humidity (> 85%). Proper care conditions should mimic the plant's natural habitat. Substrates suitable for the plant should be porous and well-draining and may include a mixture of leaf litter, sphagnum moss, coir and gravel. M. petola requires frequent watering and use of diluted fertilizer (1/4-1/8 dilution of typical orchid fertilizer). M. petola can be propagated by asexual division; note that sterilized tools and media should be used to prevent infection with pathogenic fungi. Variants of this plant exhibit different patterns in vein coloration including var. petola with yellow veins, var. robusta which exhibits longitudinal veins only, and var. argenteoreticulata syn. var. javanica which exhibits white transverse connected with longitudinal veins.
