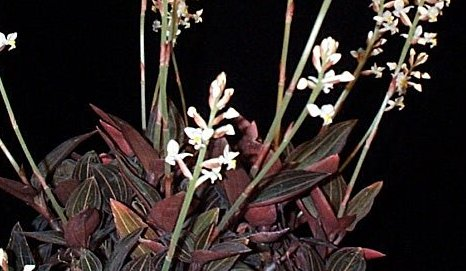

Scientific classification
- Kingdom: Plantae
- Clade: Embryophytes
- Clade: Tracheophytes
- Clade: Spermatophytes
- Clade: Angiosperms
- Clade: Monocots
- Order: Asparagales
- Family: Orchidaceae
- Subfamily: Orchidoideae
- Tribe: Cranichideae
- Subtribe: Goodyerinae
- Genus: Ludisia; A.Rich.
- Species: L. discolor

Binomial name
- Ludisia discolor (Ker Gawl.) A. Rich.

Synonyms
- Anoectochilus dawsonianus H.Low ex Rchb.f.; Anoectochilus ordeanus Jennings; Dicrophyla elegans Raf., [nom. illeg.]; Gonogona discolor (Ker Gawl.) Link; Goodyera discolor Ker Gawl.; Goodyera ordeana (Jennings) Boxall ex Náves; Goodyera ordiana B.S.Williams; Goodyera rodigasciana L.Linden; Goodyera rubrovenia B.S.Williams; Haemaria dawsoniana (H.Low ex Rchb.f.) Hasselb.; Haemaria dawsoniana (H.Low ex Rchb. f.) Hook. f.; Haemaria discolor (Ker Gawl.) Lindl.; Haemaria otletae Rolfe; Haemaria pauciflora Gagnep.; Haemaria rubrovenia (B.S.Williams) Rchb.f. ex Stein; Kuhlhasseltia carrii Holttum; Ludisia dawsoniana (H.Low ex Rchb.f.) Aver.; Ludisia discolor (Ker Gawl.) Blume; Ludisia furetii Blume; Ludisia odorata Blume; Ludisia otletae (Rolfe) Aver.; Myoda rufescens Lindl.; Neottia discolor (Ker Gawl.) Steud.; Orchiodes discolor (Ker Gawl.) Kuntze

= Ludisia =

Genus of orchids

Ludisia (Lus.) is a genus of orchids that was thought to contain just one species, Ludisia discolor, commonly referred to as jewel orchid. A second species, Ludisia ravanii, from the Philippines, was described in 2013. Ludisia discolor is native to Southern China, Northeast India, Thailand, Vietnam, the Philippines, Malaysia, Indonesia and Myanmar, and often cultivated.

== Description ==
They are terrestrial orchids that in their natural setting would be found growing on the forest floor. They are known for their foliage, which is often velvety deep maroon with red veins that run parallel to the centre of the leaf.

Flowers are white with twisting yellow columns. Individual flowers are small but grow in clusters on upright stalks. Flowers in cultivation last a month or more.

== Cultivation ==
They need high humidity and warm temperatures with low to medium light, and they tolerate extremely low light levels.

=== Conservation ===
Like many species today, Ludisia discolor and other species of terrestrial orchids face threats due to climate change and other environmental factors. Studies today that aim to understand more about how orchid species could be cultivated include micropropagation. When micropropagating Ludisia discolor in varying environments, they found that the plant was able to adapt to the environment while maintaining 99% genetic similarity with the parent plant. Now that scientists are able to control the genetic diversity of a plant in varying conditions, it will be beneficial in improving the species’ population numbers.

Apart from climate change and similar environmental factors, the species is currently facing threats of Fusarium oxysporum, which manifests as a stem rot, affecting the flowering of some species of orchids.

=== Cultivars ===
Ludisia discolor has two notable cultivars:

- L. discolor 'Alba', an albino variant, and
- L. discolor 'Nigrescens', a mutation often referred to as "black velvet".

== Hybrids ==
Hybrids of Ludisia with other orchid genera are placed in the following nothogenera:

- Dossisia (Dsi.) = Ludisia × Dossinia
- Goodisia (Gda.) = Ludisia × Goodyera
- Ludochilus (Lud.) = Ludisia × Anoectochilus
- Macodisia (Mcd.) = Ludisia × Macodes

Note that these hybrids are with other genera in the subtribe Goodyerinae, all commonly referred to as jewel orchids.

(The given references are to registered primary hybrids within each given nothogenus.)
