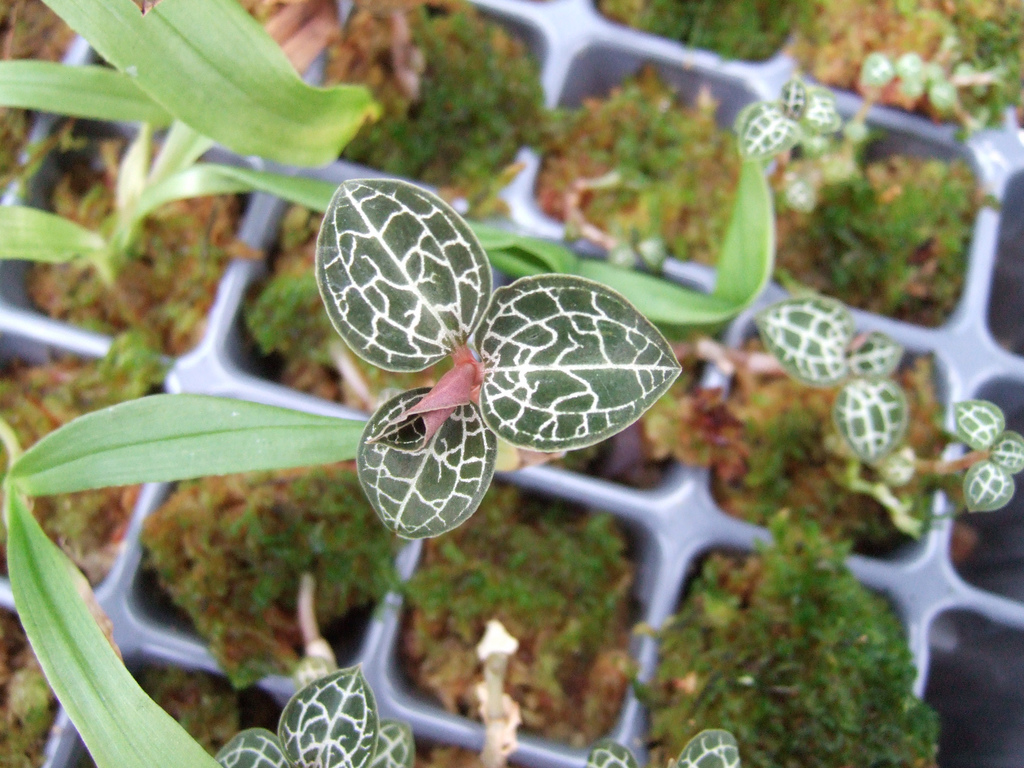

Scientific classification
- Kingdom: Plantae
- Clade: Tracheophytes
- Clade: Angiosperms
- Clade: Monocots
- Order: Asparagales
- Family: Orchidaceae
- Subfamily: Orchidoideae
- Tribe: Cranichideae
- Genus: Anoectochilus
- Species: A. brevilabris

Binomial name
- Anoectochilus brevilabris Lindl.

Synonyms
- Dossinia marmarata Lindl.; Anoectochilus griffithii Hook.f.; Anoectochilus sikkimensis King & Pantl.; Anoectochilus brevilabris var. gigantea Pradhan; Anoectochilus tridentatus Seidenf.

= Anoectochilus brevilabris =

Species of flowering plant

Anoectochilus brevilabris is a species of orchid native to the mountains of Sikkim, Nepal, Assam, India, and Vietnam.
