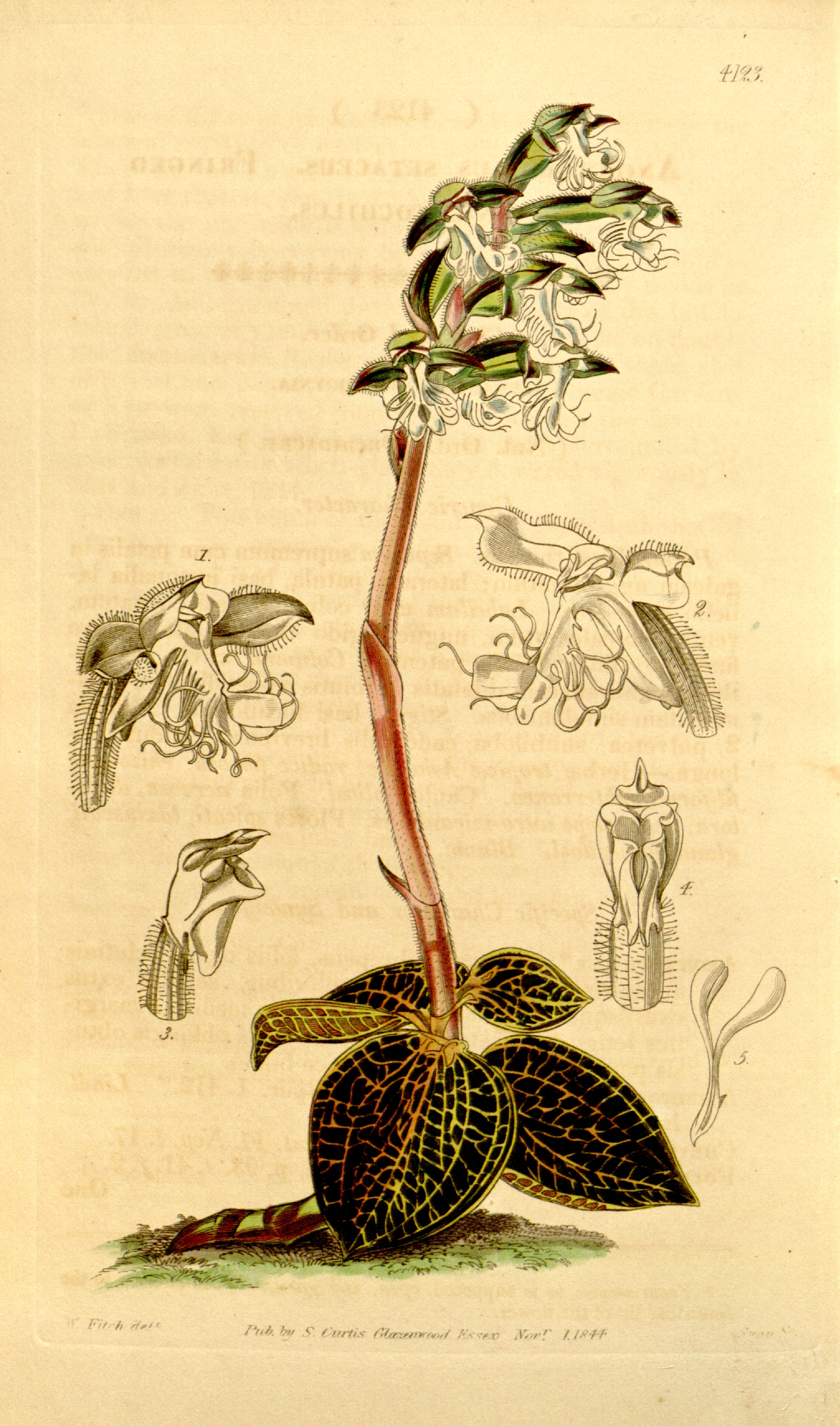

Scientific classification
- Kingdom: Plantae
- Clade: Tracheophytes
- Clade: Angiosperms
- Clade: Monocots
- Order: Asparagales
- Family: Orchidaceae
- Subfamily: Orchidoideae
- Tribe: Cranichideae
- Genus: Anoectochilus
- Species: A. setaceus

Binomial name
- Anoectochilus setaceus Blume

Synonyms
- Chrysobaphus roxburghii Wall. (1826); Anoectochilus roxburghii (Wall.) Lindl. (1832); Anoectochilus setaceus Lindl. (1837); Anoectochilus lobbianus Planch. (1849); Anoectochilus xanthophyllus Planch. (1849); Anoectochilus aureus K. Koch & Lauche (1857); Anoectochilus setaceopictus K. Koch & Lauche (1857); Orchis picta Reinw. ex Lindl. (1857); Anoectochilus regalis Blume (1858); Anoectochilus latomaculatus Blume (1859); Anoectochilus frederici-augusti Rchb.f. (1860); Anoectochilus regalis H. Low ex C. Morren (1862); Anoectochilus yungianus S.Y. Hu (1971); Zeuxine roxburghii (Wall.) M. Hiroe (1971); Anoectochilus roxburghii var. regalis (Blume) Pradhan (1976)

= Anoectochilus setaceus =

Species of flowering plant

Anoectochilus setaceus, the bristly anoectochilus, is a species of orchid native to the island of Java and Sumatra in Indonesia.
