= LUS =

LUS or lus can refer to:

- Latymer Upper School
- Mizo language ISO 639 code
- Socialist Unity League (Mexico)

== See also ==
- Lus., abbreviation for botanical term lusus naturae
- Ludisia, a genus of orchids abbreviated as Lus.
