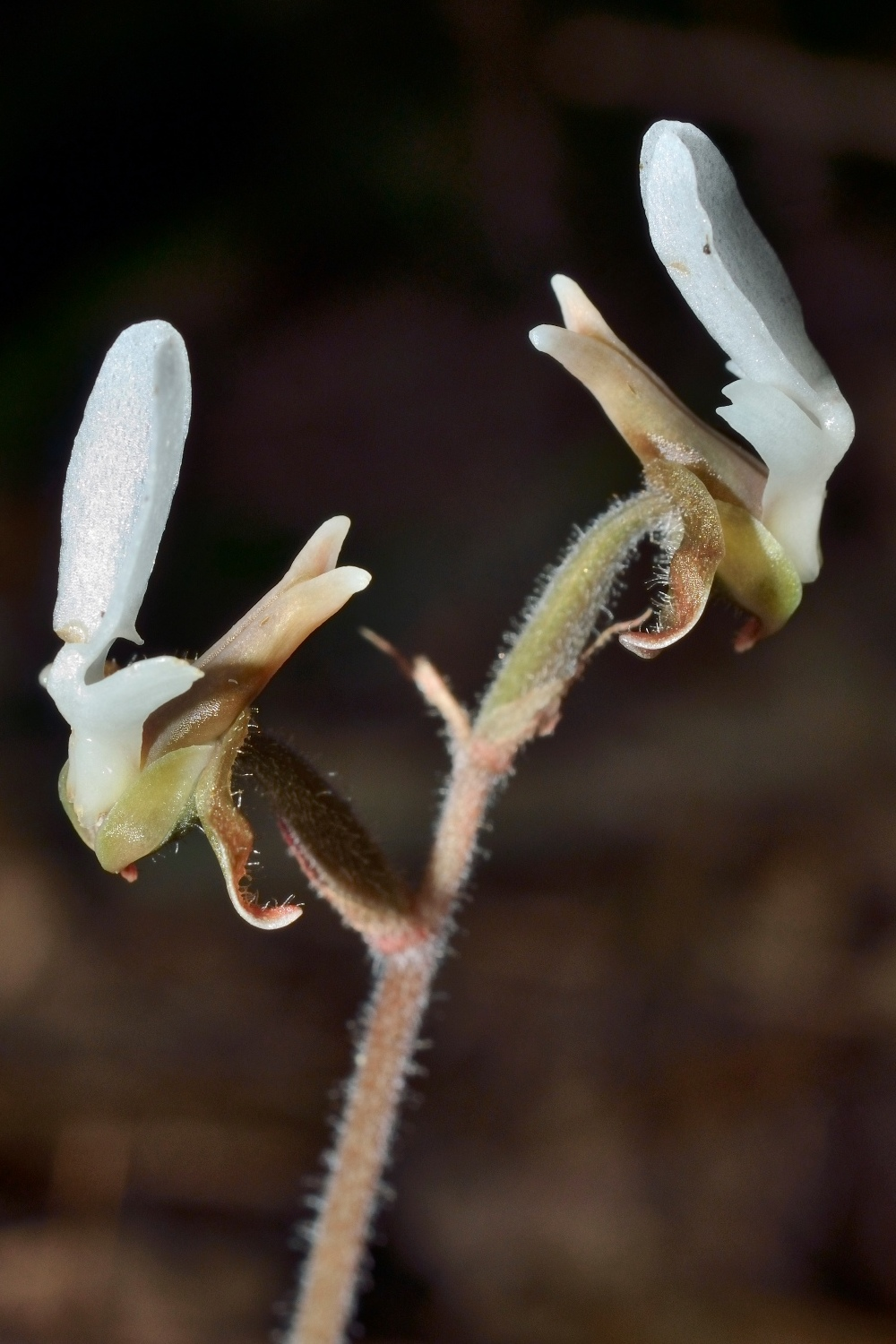

Conservation status
- Data Deficient (IUCN 3.1)

Scientific classification
- Kingdom: Plantae
- Clade: Tracheophytes
- Clade: Angiosperms
- Clade: Monocots
- Order: Asparagales
- Family: Orchidaceae
- Subfamily: Orchidoideae
- Tribe: Cranichideae
- Genus: Anoectochilus
- Species: A. koshunensis

Binomial name
- Anoectochilus koshunensis Hayata

Synonyms
- Odontochilus koshunensis (Hayata) S.S.Ying

= Anoectochilus koshunensis =

Species of flowering plant

Anoectochilus koshunensis is a species of plant in the family Orchidaceae native to Taiwan and to Nansei-shoto (Ryukyu Islands).

== Description ==
Leaves are almost 8 cm long, with golden nerves, dark green, and slightly hairy. The spikes grow upwards with blooms in large intervals, facing down. They are usually white, with upper pink-red sepal and petals which form an eyelid. Lip base with a frayed edge. This kind of plant blooms mostly throughout the year.

Anoectochilus koshunensis differs from all species of Anoectochilus by the mesochil which is not afforded with pectinate lobes, but instead has broadly entire wing-shaped lobes, by the columnal appendages which are doubly folded and beak-shaped at the apex, and by the triangular lateral lobes at the mouth of the spurs.

Anoectochilus koshunensishas thickened roots and a smooth solitary stem measuring 16 cm long by 3 mm, which become thick at the base. Simple pointed ruborous flowers, greasy-purple below, smooth above and pubescent near the base, leafless at the apex. Leaves alternating up to the middle of the stem, with 3-4 petiole, rounded-ovate blades measuring 2 1/2 cm long and 18 mm wide. Obtuse at the apex, acute at the base and round at the petiole. Smooth on both sides of the membranous 5 parallel nerves, reddish-purple underneath. Sheaths with petioles measuring 1 cm long, folded and slightly pubescent.

== Uses ==
The plant is very much in demand for medical research once it has been reported that the local people on the island have used the plant to cure snake bite.
