= Anoectochilus zhejiangensis =

Conservation status
- Endangered (IUCN 3.1)

Scientific classification
- Kingdom: Plantae
- Clade: Tracheophytes
- Clade: Angiosperms
- Clade: Monocots
- Order: Asparagales
- Family: Orchidaceae
- Subfamily: Orchidoideae
- Tribe: Cranichideae
- Genus: Anoectochilus
- Species: A. zhejiangensis

Binomial name
- Anoectochilus zhejiangensis Z.Wei & Y.B.Chang

Species of flowering plant

Anoectochilus zhejiangensis is a species of plant in the family Orchidaceae. Endemic to China (Fujian, Guangxi, and Zhejiang provinces), individuals are found primarily in damp forest and valleys. Standing from 8 to 16 cm tall, the orchids are defined by their reddish-brown stems and pale petals.
