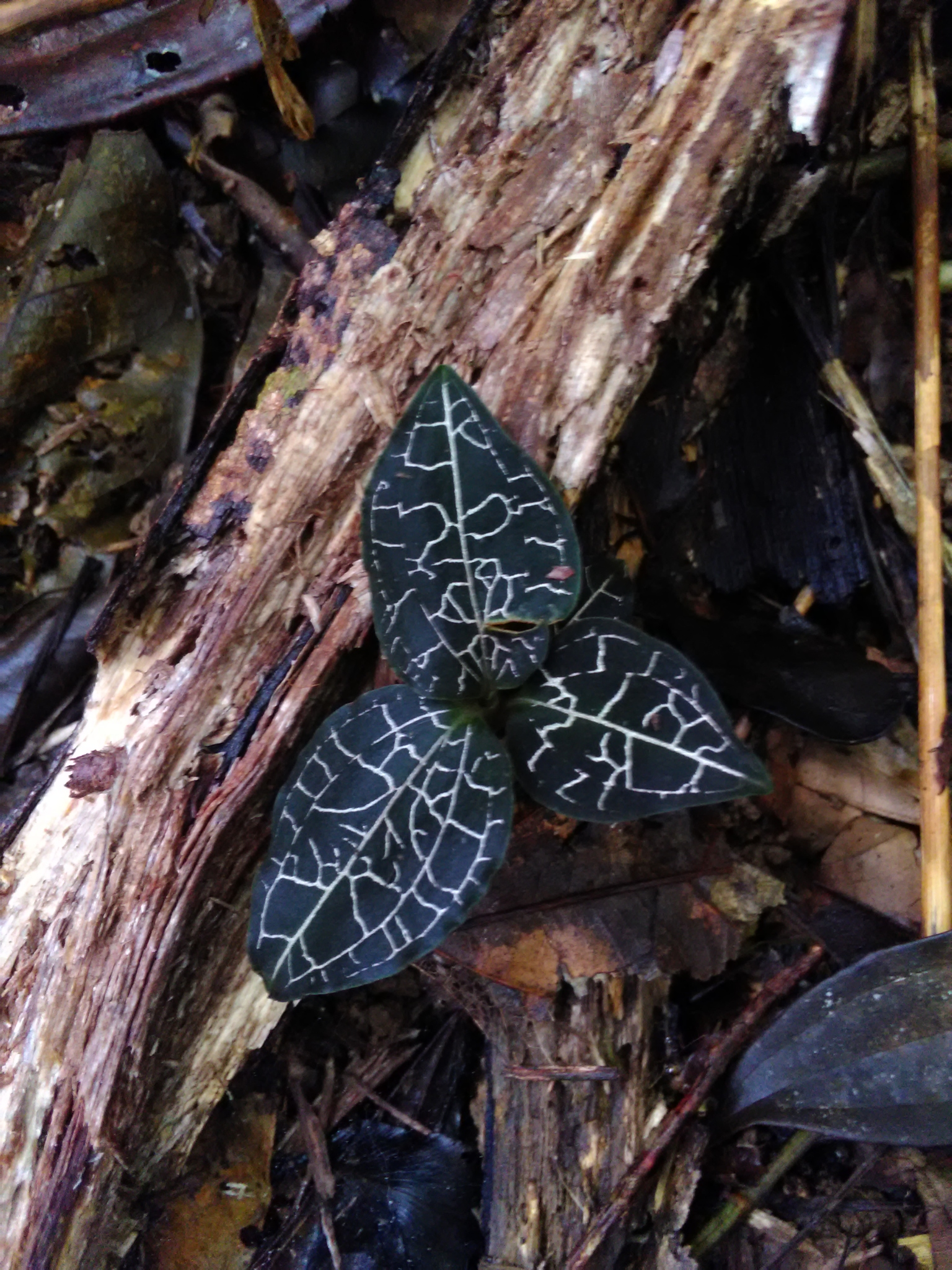

Scientific classification
- Kingdom: Plantae
- Clade: Embryophytes
- Clade: Tracheophytes
- Clade: Spermatophytes
- Clade: Angiosperms
- Clade: Monocots
- Order: Asparagales
- Family: Orchidaceae
- Subfamily: Orchidoideae
- Tribe: Cranichideae
- Genus: Anoectochilus
- Species: A. yatesiae

Binomial name
- Anoectochilus yatesiae F.M.Bailey

= Anoectochilus yatesiae =

Marbled jewel orchid

Species of flowering plant

Anoectochilus yatesiae, commonly known as the marbled jewel orchid, is a species of orchid that is endemic to northern Queensland, Australia. It has up to six dark green leaves with a network of silvery veins and up to four hairy brownish and white flowers.

== Description ==
Anoectochilus yatesiae is a tuberous, perennial herb with up to six leaves forming a rosette on the end of its fleshy rhizome. The leaves are dark green, broadly egg-shaped to heart-shaped with a network of silvery veins, 30–60 mm (1–2 in) long and 30–40 mm (1–2 in) wide. Up to four brownish flowers 14–18 mm (0.6–0.7 in) long and 18–22 mm (0.7–0.9 in) wide are borne on a flowering stem 150–250 mm (6–10 in) tall. The dorsal sepal is 10–12 mm (0.4–0.5 in) long, 4–5 mm (0.16–0.20 in) wide and with the petals, forms a hood over the column. The lateral sepals are a similar length to the dorsal sepal but narrower and spread apart from each other. The petals are white, glabrous, 8–10 mm (0.3–0.4 in) long and about 2 mm (0.08 in) wide. The labellum is upright, white, 12–15 mm (0.5–0.6 in) long, 2–3 mm (0.08–0.1 in) wide and has about twelve crooked white hairs 4–7 mm (0.2–0.3 in) long on the narrow section. The nectary spur is about 5 mm (0.2 in) long. Flowering occurs from July to September.

== Taxonomy and naming ==
Anoectochilus yatesiae was first formally described in 1907 by Frederick Manson Bailey from specimens collected near Kuranda and the description was published in the Queensland Agricultural Journal. The specific epithet (yatesiae) honours "Mrs. Arthur Yates", one of the collectors of the type specimen.

== Distribution and habitat ==
The marbled jewel orchid grows in highland rainforest between the Bloomfield River and Paluma Range National Park.
