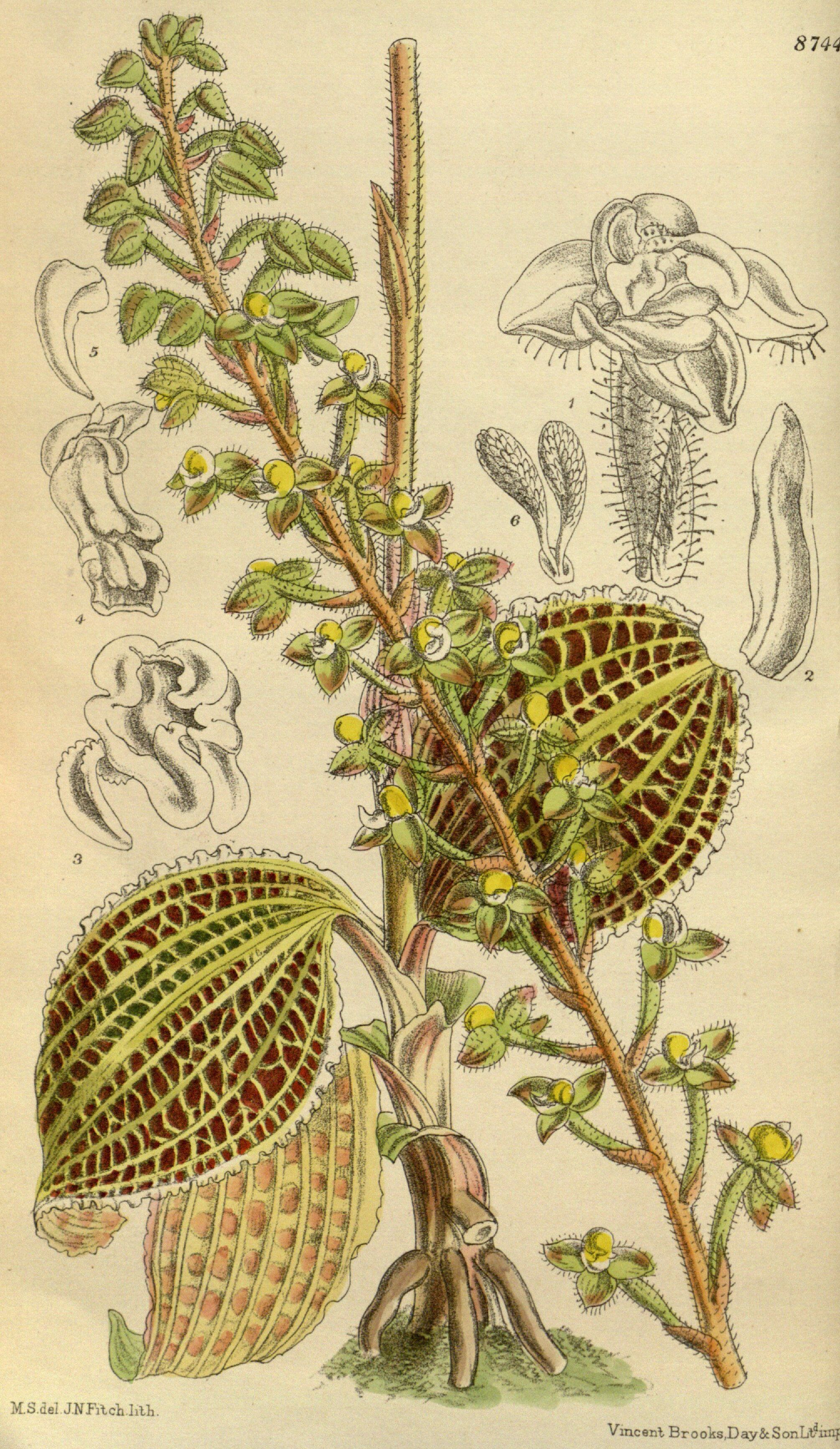

Scientific classification
- Kingdom: Plantae
- Clade: Embryophytes
- Clade: Tracheophytes
- Clade: Spermatophytes
- Clade: Angiosperms
- Clade: Monocots
- Order: Asparagales
- Family: Orchidaceae
- Subfamily: Orchidoideae
- Tribe: Cranichideae
- Genus: Macodes
- Species: M. sanderiana

Binomial name
- Macodes sanderiana (Kraenzl.) R.A.Rolfe, 1896

= Macodes sanderiana =

Species of orchid

Macodes sanderiana (Kraenzl.) Rolfe is a species of South East Asian jewel orchid mostly recorded from New Guinea but is also found in the Solomon Islands and Vanuatu. This species has a long history of cultivation in Europe since the early 20th century and is prized for its ornamental leaves which are the largest in its genus. The leaves are dark green, the upper surface covered in an intricate network of veins in colors ranging from bright green to copper. In contrast, flowers are small and pallid so are often removed in cultivation. In nature, M. sanderiana grows in rainforests on the forest floor or lithophytically out of rock crevices. This species survives at a broad range of altitudes from close to sea-level, up to the lower boundary of the cloud forest. Exudates from the leaves of this orchid are traditionally used in New Guinea as eye drops for the treatment of myopia. M. sanderiana has not been assessed for the IUCN red list, however, as recently as the 1980’s this species was common in parts of its range within New Guinea.

== Description ==
Macodes sanderiana is a terrestrial orchid with a compact creeping habit. The primary roots of M. sanderiana are fleshy and rarely branch, lateral feeding roots are short and black and are densely arranged on the primary roots. Upright stems are slightly succulent and two to four centimeters high carrying four to six leaves. As stems grow longer, they begin to bend downwards and to explore the forest floor rooting as they grow. In this way the plant can clonally reproduce and colonies can enlarge. Leaves attach to the stem via five centimetres (2.0 in) long petioles which clasp the stem at their base. M. sanderiana has the largest leaves of its genus, they are fleshy and often exceed sixteen centimetres (6.3 in) in length and eight centimetres (3.1 in) in width. Like their petioles, leaf bases also clasp the stem, this is more apparent in developing than mature leaves. Leaves are ovate to elliptic in shape and leaf apices are recurved (bent downwards) and concave whilst the rest of the leaf is convex. The adaxial (upper) leaf surface is the defining feature of this species, it is covered in a complex network of veins. The midrib vein is the most prominent and is surrounded by two other well defined primary veins, all three of which converge close to the leaf apex. A further prominent pair of primary veins border the leaf margin but are only well-defined part of the way up the leaf. The primary leaf veins are distinct as they differ in color from the rest of the leaf being bright to pallid green but always lighter than the surrounding tissue. As well as primary veins, meandering and frequently branching secondary veins are arranged across the leaf meeting the primary veins at right angles. Secondary veins may be copper colored but are often the same pale green as the primary veins. In contrast to the leaf veins the ground tissue is usually dark olive-green sometimes tinted with maroon. The abaxial (lower) surface of the leaf is pale green between veins and usually has pinkish patches towards the leaf margin. Leaf color is known to be variable in Macodes, this is thought to be linked to the plants' growing conditions especially light intensity. Higher light levels are associated with purplish leaves caused by the build-up of anthocyanins; in lower light the orchids develop greener leaves. The inflorescence of Sander’s orchid is thirty centimetres (12 in) tall and erect. The peduncle (inflorescence stem) is thirty centimetres (12 in) high and characterized as a scape due to it being composed of one elongated node. The scape surface is puberulent (covered in short downy hairs). During its development the inflorescence is enclosed in several oblong sheaths, modified leaves which protect the developing flowers. The inflorescence of M. sanderiana holds between ten and twenty small flowers which face away from the peduncle in all directions. Due to the excessive elongation of the peduncle, flowers are lax (far apart in the inflorescence). The arrangement of flowers on the inflorescence is characterized as a raceme, defined as an indeterminate unbranched inflorescence. During development, flowers are enclosed by membranous bracts around 0.6 centimetres (0.24 in) long. After the flower emerges the bracts remain attached to the pedicel base. Connecting the flowers to the peduncle are short one centimetre (0.39 in) long pubescent pedicels. Unlike most orchids the flowers are non-resupinate which means that they do not twist 180 degrees during development, consequently the labellum faces upwards and the dorsal sepal downwards. Flower color is variable though always muted, colors range from pale pink to yellow-green. Like most of the plants' surface, the floral parts exposed during development are covered with short dense glandular trichomes. Lateral sepals are 0.6 cm (0.24 in) long, ovate to oblong shaped, clearly concave and spreading when fully open. Petals are linear to oblong with obtuse apices, they are similar in length to the sepals. The labellum is 0.5 centimetres (0.20 in) long, trilobed and bends back on itself. The base is saccate (sack shaped) and minutely crenated. The central labellum lobe has a narrow base and a short spreading blade. The flower column is 0.4 centimetres (0.16 in) wide and holds two pear-shaped pollinia.

The defining features of Macodes sanderiana are its large leaves (in comparison to other jewel orchids), its wide pale-green streak overlying its midrib vein and its crenated leaf margins. Despite this, it is often confused with its close relative M. petola (Blume) Lindl. with which it shares many characteristics such as its nearly identical floral structures. The key feature differentiating the two species is the white-chlorotic and crenated leaf margin of M. sanderiana which contrasts with the pale-green and entire leaf margin of M. petola.

== Etymology ==
The generic name ‘Macodes’ is derived from ‘macer’ (narrow). The specific epithet ‘sanderiana’ is named after the German nurseryman Henry Frederick Conrad Sander who lived in Hertfordshire and first introduced M. sanderiana to Britain.

== Habitat and ecology ==
Macodes sanderiana grows from close to sea-level in low elevation rain forests up to altitudes of at least 800 meters at the lower boundary of the cloud forest. This orchid can grow on a range of substrates which occur through its range. Sander’s orchid is most commonly grown on humus covered rocks near streams and from between rocks in areas where topsoil is almost entirely absent. Despite this orchid usually being described as terrestrial, it is known to grow as a lithophyte in minute crevices in karst cliff faces. Two unspecified species of New Guinean Macodes are even known to grow on trees (possibly Macodes petola or M. sanderiana). As well as growing on substrates with good drainage they also are known to grow in clay soils that never dry out. Sander's orchids are often found growing within moss layers on the forest floor and are known to co-occur with the pacific lychee tree Pometia pinnata. In New Guinea, M. sanderiana flowers annually in July, with each stem producing a maximum of one flower spike. All orchids are known to depend on mycorrhizal fungi for germination and to aid nutrient uptake. Despite this, researchers have been unable to isolate mycorrhiza from M. sanderiana.

== Distribution ==
Macodes sanderiana has been principally recorded in New Guinea and the Bismarck Archipelago. It also grows in Vanuatu including the Banks Islands, as well as Sumatra. It is found at altitudes from near sea level to 850 metres (2,790 ft), at temperatures ranging from 20 to 35 °C (68 to 95 °F).

== Taxonomy and systematics ==
In 1895 Macodes sanderiana was recorded in ‘The Gardeners Chronicle’ under the name Anoetochilus sanderianus after being introduced to England by Conrad Sander. This binomial was invalidly published and is therefore a nomen provisorium and not an accepted name. As a result almost all the literature refers to Sander's orchid under its accepted name Macodes sanderiana. This was published the following year by the first curator of the Royal Botanic Gardens Kew’s Orchid Herbarium, Robert Allen Rolfe in the ‘Kew Bulletin of Miscellaneous Information’, based upon a description from a specimen from Sunder Islands. No species level phylogenies have been undertaken for Macodes. However, Macodes sanderiana has been sequenced to place the genus using the regions ITS, rpl16 and trnL-F for a mixed genus and species level phylogeny. This phylogeny placed Macodes sanderiana in a clade with the monotypic jewel orchid Dossinia marmorata C.Morren. Sander’s orchid is more distantly related to Ludisia discolor (Ker Gawl.) Blume and species in the genus Pristiglottis Cretz. & J.J.Sm. Other research places Macodes sanderiana in different positions in the phylogeny and there is not yet consensus on its closest relatives. Despite these uncertainties, similarities in morphology and distribution have long been recognized between M. sanderiana and M. petola therefore M. petola has been suggested as its closest relative.

== Cultivation ==
Macodes species including Sander's orchid are cultivated for their attractive prominently-veined leaves more so than for their flowers. In 1918, at least three species of Macodes (all native to Malaysia) including M. sanderiana were cultivated in Europe. Despite their initial popularity, by the late 20th century they were rarely seen in collections. Since then, there has been a resurgence in the cultivation of both M. sanderiana and M. petola both of which are now common, especially in smaller private collections. Sander’s orchid requires similar environmental conditions to other terrestrial jewel orchids such as Anoectochilus roxburghii (Wall.) Lindl. and Macodes petola. These species prefer warm conditions and high humidity and can survive in lower light than most other orchids. To provide this environment outside of the tropics they are often grown in terrariums. As the species is terrestrial (unlike most tropical orchids) it can be grown in soil. Many collectors, however, grow this species in shallow dishes of coarse sphagnum moss.

== Ethnobotany ==
In parts of New Guinea, Macodes sanderiana is called ‘Ndralngamoeh’. Some unspecified Macodes species are used in New Guinea to treat myopia (nearsightedness). Leaves of the orchid are crushed and the liquid exuded is administered as eye drops. Users believe this improves their calligraphy and aids them in reading religious texts.

== Conservation ==
Neither Macodes sanderiana nor any other Macodes species has been evaluated for the IUCN Red List. As little data is available on the distribution of Sander’s orchid with only eighteen georeferenced records available on GBIF (just five of which are post 1980), this would make any red listing assessment speculative. Despite the low number of occurrence records, a 1985 publication described this orchid as ‘quite common’ in part of its range within New Guinea.
