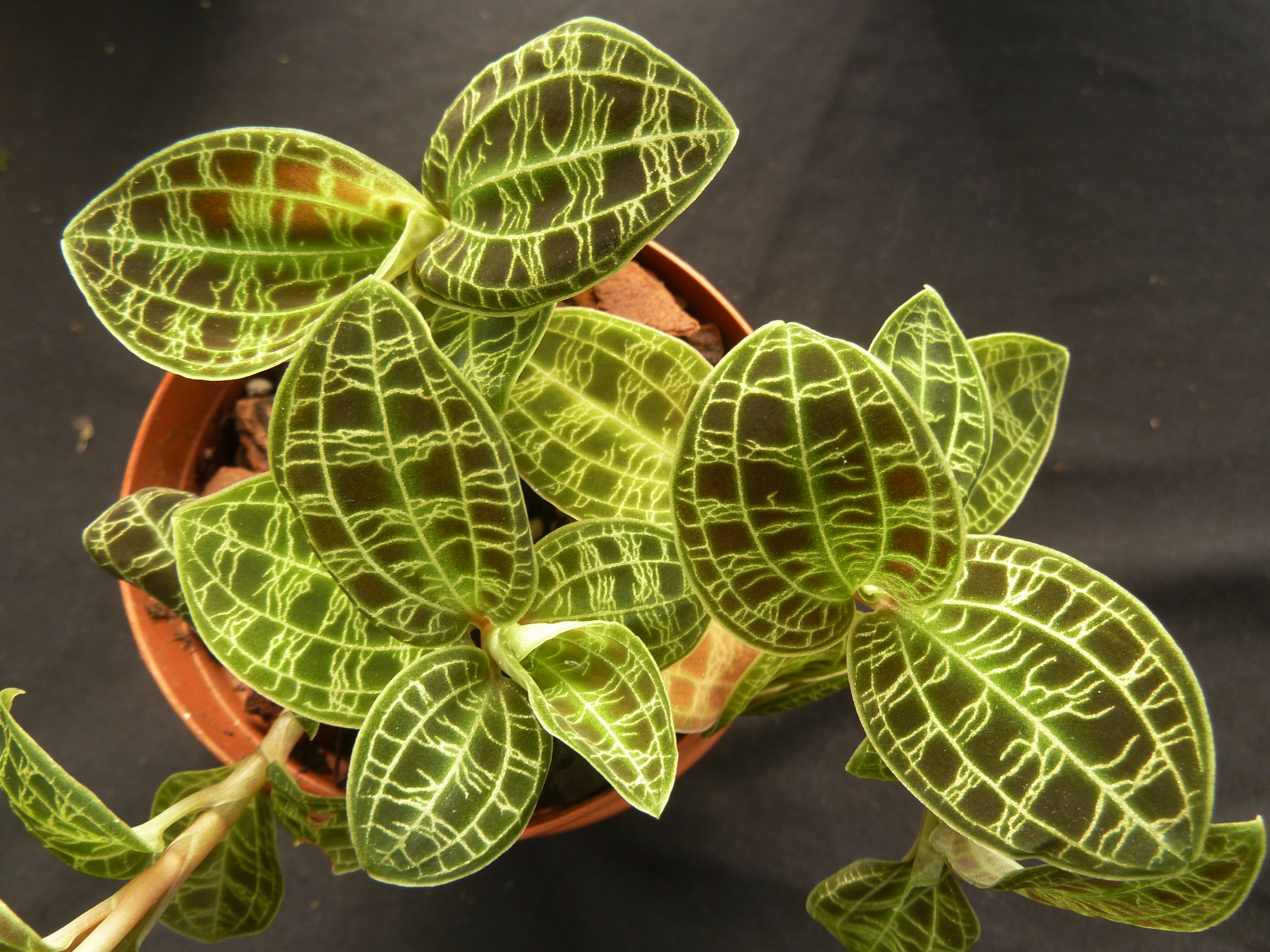
- Cultivated M. petola orchid

Scientific classification
- Kingdom: Plantae
- Clade: Tracheophytes
- Clade: Angiosperms
- Clade: Monocots
- Order: Asparagales
- Family: Orchidaceae
- Subfamily: Orchidoideae
- Tribe: Cranichideae
- Subtribe: Goodyerinae
- Genus: Macodes; Lindl.

Synonyms
- Argyrorchis Blume; Pseudomacodes Rolfe

= Macodes =

Genus of orchids

Macodes is one of a few genera of the orchid family known as jewel orchids. These terrestrial orchids grows in the rainforest floor of Southeast Asia with high humidity and low light. They can also be found in New Guinea, Vanuatu, the Solomon Islands and the Ryukyu Islands. The plant is cultivated for the veined leaves, unlike most other orchids that are valued for the flowers.

== Species ==
The species accepted as of June 2014 include:

1. Macodes angustilabris J.J.Sm. – Borneo
2. Macodes celebica Rolfe – Sulawesi
3. Macodes cominsii (Rolfe) Rolfe – Solomons
4. Macodes cupida Ormerod – Vietnam
5. Macodes dendrophila Schltr. – New Guinea, Solomons
6. Macodes limii J.J.Wood & A.L.Lamb – Sabah
7. Macodes megalantha Ormerod – New Guinea
8. Macodes obscura Schltr. – New Guinea
9. Macodes petola (Blume) Lindl. – Thailand, Malaysia, Indonesia, Philippines, Ryukyu Islands
10. Macodes pulcherrima Schltr. – New Guinea
11. Macodes sanderiana (Kraenzl.) Rolfe – Indonesia, New Guinea, Solomons, Vanuatu
