= Anoectochilus sandvicensis =

Hawaii jewel-orchid

Conservation status
- Vulnerable (IUCN 3.1)

Scientific classification
- Kingdom: Plantae
- Clade: Tracheophytes
- Clade: Angiosperms
- Clade: Monocots
- Order: Asparagales
- Family: Orchidaceae
- Subfamily: Orchidoideae
- Tribe: Cranichideae
- Genus: Anoectochilus
- Species: A. sandvicensis

Binomial name
- Anoectochilus sandvicensis Lindl.

Synonyms
- Odontochilus sandvicensis (Lindl.) Benth. & Hook.f. ex Drake; Vrydagzynea sandvicensis (Lindl.) Benth. & Hook.f. ex B.D.Jacks.; Anoectochilus jaubertii Gaudich.; Odontochilus jaubertii (Gaudich.) Blume; Cystopus jaubertii (Gaudich.) Kuntze; Anoectochilus apiculatus L.O.Williams & Fosberg; Anoectochilus sandvicensis var. apiculatus (L.O.Williams & Fosberg) W.J.Schrenk

Species of flowering plant

Anoectochilus sandvicensis

Anoectochilus sandvicensis, also called Hawaii jewel-orchid, is a species of plant in the family Orchidaceae. It is endemic to Hawaii. It is threatened by habitat loss. It is found in the Haleakala National Park. It grows in dense, dark, and continuously saturated forest. A. sandvicensis is a perennial herb which grows up to 20 in (51 cm) tall.
