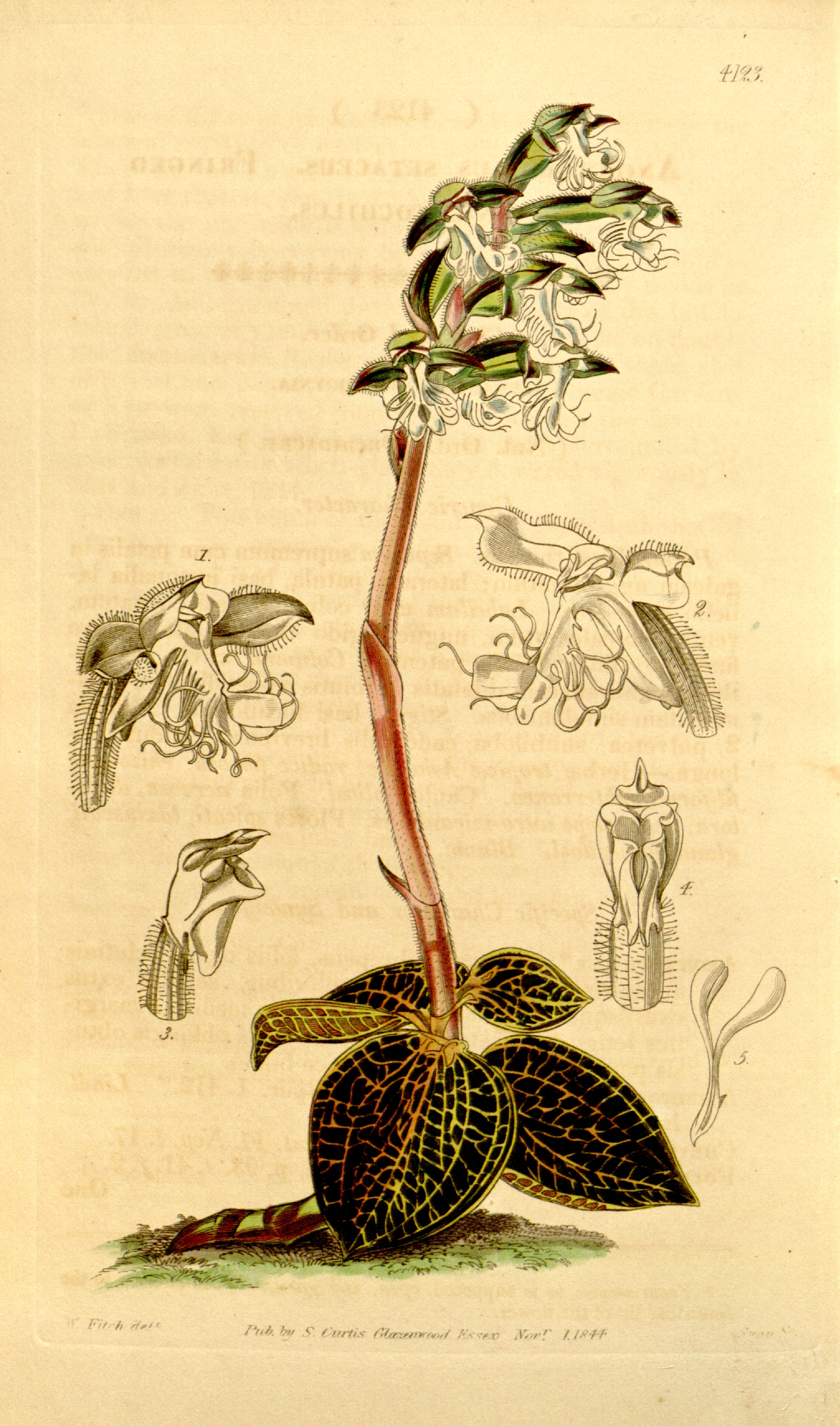
- Anoectochilus setaceus 1844 illustration

Scientific classification
- Kingdom: Plantae
- Clade: Tracheophytes
- Clade: Angiosperms
- Clade: Monocots
- Order: Asparagales
- Family: Orchidaceae
- Subfamily: Orchidoideae
- Tribe: Cranichideae
- Subtribe: Goodyerinae
- Genus: Anoectochilus; Blume

Type species
- Anoectochilus setaceus Blume

Species
- See text

= Anoectochilus =

Genus of orchids

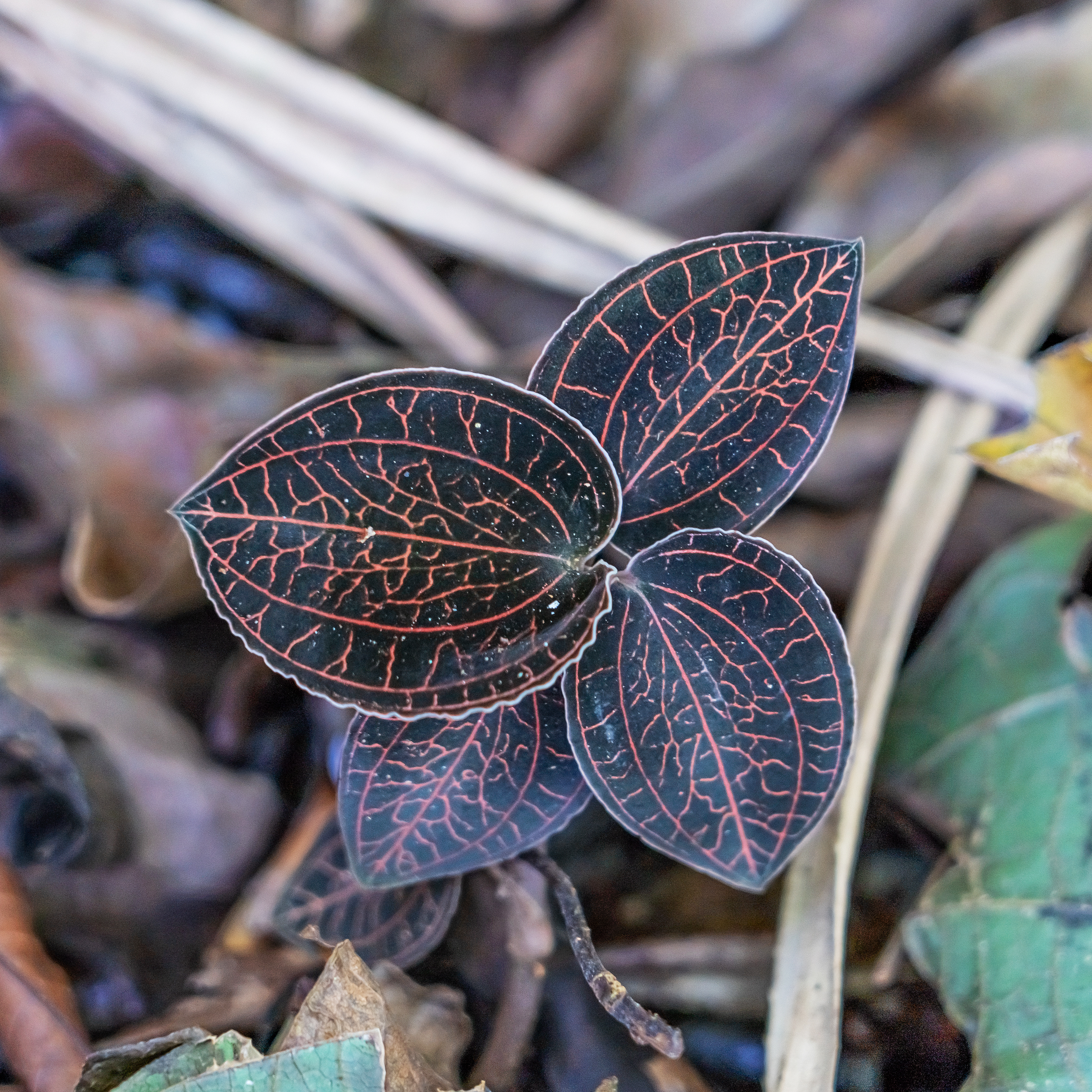
Anoectochilus regalis

Anoectochilus, commonly known as marbled jewel orchids or filigree orchids, is a genus of about fifty species in the orchid family Orchidaceae. They are terrestrial herbs with a creeping rhizome, an upright flowering stem and dark coloured leaves with contrasting veins. The flowers are relatively large and have a large labellum, markedly different from the sepals and petals.

== Description ==
Orchids in the genus Anoectochilus are terrestrial, perennial, deciduous, sympodial herbs with a creeping, above-ground rhizome with wiry roots that look woolly. The leaves are arranged in a rosette and are relatively broad and thin. They are dark green or brownish purple and have a contrasting network of silvery or reddish veins. The flowers are relatively large, hairy, velvety, resupinate and arranged in a short spike. The dorsal sepal and petals overlap to form a hood over the column with the lateral sepals spreading apart from each other. The labellum is relatively large with two sections - an upper "epichile" and lower "hypochile" separated by a narrow section. The hypochile has a cylinder-shaped spur containing two large glands and is joined to the epichile with a "claw" that has spreading teeth or a long fringe. The fruit is a hairy capsule containing a large number of winged seeds.

== Taxonomy and naming ==
The genus Anoectochilus was first formally described in 1825 by Carl Ludwig Blume and Anoectochilus setaceus was the first species he described, hence it is the type species. The genus name is derived from the Ancient Greek words anoiktos (ἀνοικτός) meaning "opened" and cheilos (χεῖλος) meaning "lip".

In China, Anoectochilus roxburghii is known as Jinxianlian (Chinese: 金线莲; pinyin: Jīnxiànlián) or Jinxianlan (Chinese: 金线兰; pinyin: Jīnxiànlán), and is used in cooking, ornamentation, and traditional medicine.

== Distribution ==
Orchids in this genus range from the Himalayas to south China, Southeast Asia, Australia, New Guinea, Melanesia and Hawaii, found in moist areas with deep shade.

=== List of species ===
The following is a list of species recognised by the World Checklist of Selected Plant Families as at May 2018:

- Anoectochilus albolineatus C.S.P.Parish & Rchb.f. (1874) : white lines anoectochilus (Myanmar, Thailand, Vietnam)
- Anoectochilus albomarginatus Loudon (1855)
- Anoectochilus annamenis (2007) (Vietnam)
- Anoectochilus baotingensis (K.Y.Lang) Ormerod (2003) (China, Hainan)
- Anoectochilus brevilabris Lindl. (1840) : short-lipped Anoectochilus
- Anoectochilus brevistylus (Hook.f.) Ridl. (1907)
- Anoectochilus burmannicus Rolfe (1922)
- Anoectochilus calcareus Aver. (1996 publ. 1997).
- Anoectochilus dewildeorum Ormerod (2005) (Sumatra)
- Anoectochilus dulongensis Ormerod (2013) (Sumatra)
- Anoectochilus elatus Lindl. (1857).
- Anoectochilus emeiensis K.Y.Lang (1982)
- Anoectochilus falconis Ormerod (2005) (Malaysia)
- Anoectochilus flavescens Blume (1825).
- Anoectochilus formosanus Hayata (1914).
- Anoectochilus geniculatus Ridl. (1896) (Thailand, Malaysia, Sumatra)
- Anoectochilus hainanensis H.Z.Tian, F.W.Xing & L.Li (2008).
- Anoectochilus imitans Schltr. (1906).
- Anoectochilus insignis Schltr. (1911).
- Anoectochilus integrilabris Carr (1935).
- Anoectochilus kinabaluensis (Rolfe) J.J.Wood & Ormerod (1994).
- Anoectochilus klabatensis (Schltr.) S.Thomas (2002).
- Anoectochilus koshunensis Hayata (1914).
- Anoectochilus longicalcaratus J.J.Sm. (1922).
- Anoectochilus longilobus H.Jiang & H.Z.Tian (2014).
- Anoectochilus lylei Rolfe ex Downie (1925).
- Anoectochilus malipoensis W.H.Chen & Y.M.Shui (2010).
- Anoectochilus monicae J.J.Wood (2004).
- Anoectochilus nandanensis Y.Feng Huang & X.C.Qu (2015).
- Anoectochilus narasimhanii Sumathi & al. (2003).
- Anoectochilus nicobaricus N.P.Balakr. & P.Chakra (1978 publ. 1979).
- Anoectochilus papillosus Aver. (2007).
- Anoectochilus papuanus (Schltr.) W.Kittr. (1984 publ. 1985).
- Anoectochilus pectinatus (Hook.f.) Ridl. (1907).
- Anoectochilus pingbianensis K.Y.Lang (1996).
- Anoectochilus regalis Blume (1858).
- Anoectochilus reinwardtii Blume (1858).
- Anoectochilus rhombilabius Ormerod (2002).
- Anoectochilus roxburghii (Wall.) Lindl. (1839).
- Anoectochilus sandvicensis Lindl. (1840)
- Anoectochilus setaceus Blume (1825) : bristly anoectochilus (type species)
- Anoectochilus subregularis (Rchb.f.) Ormerod (1996).
- Anoectochilus sumatranus (J.J.Sm.) J.B.Comber (2001).
- Anoectochilus xingrenensis Z.H.Tsi & X.H.Jin (2002).
- Anoectochilus yatesiae F.M.Bailey (1907) (Queensland)
- Anoectochilus zhejiangensis Z.Wei & Y.B.Chang (1989).
