= Achille Richard =

French botanist, botanical illustrator and physician

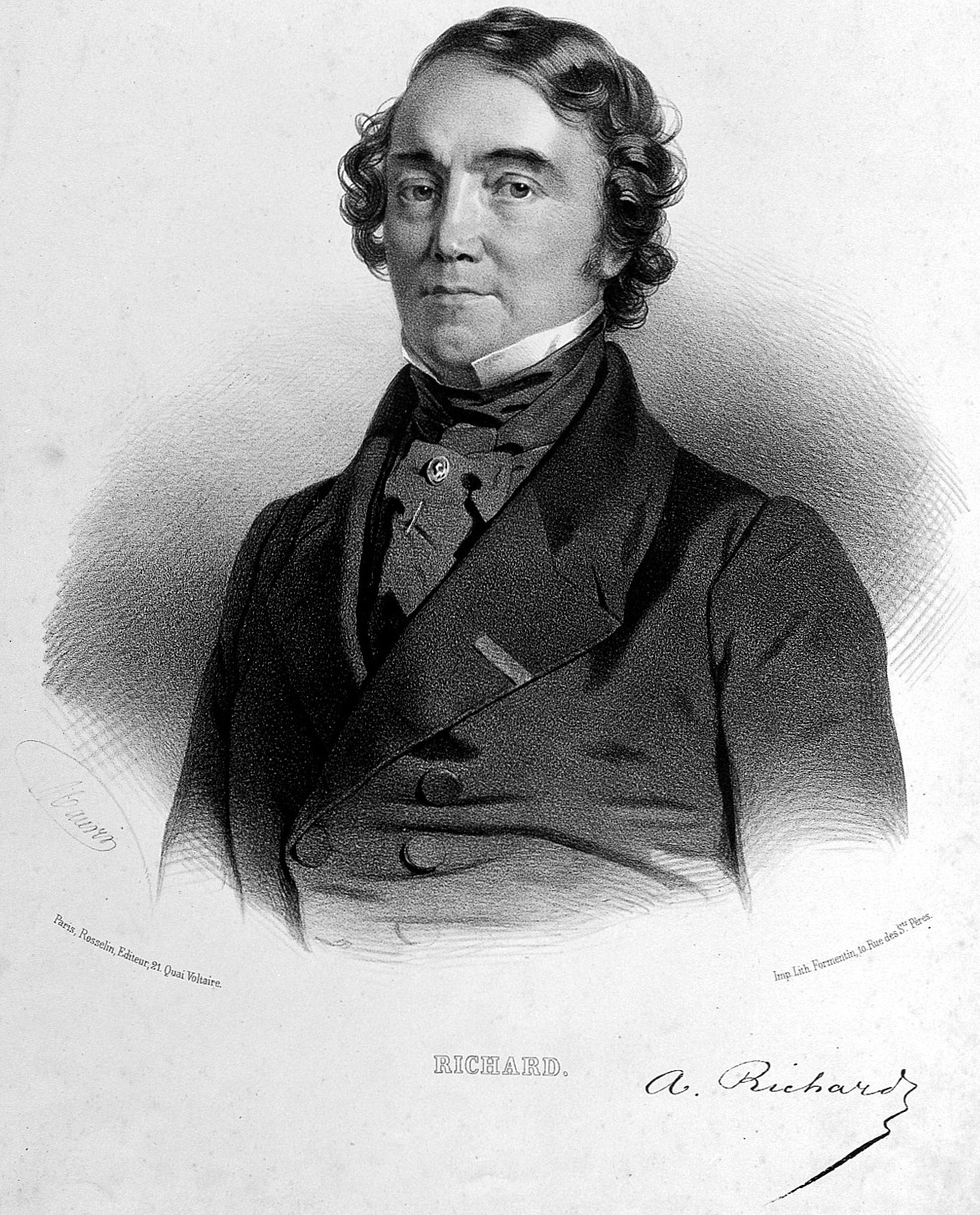
- 5 October 1852
- Born: April 27, 1794; Paris, France
- Died: October 5, 1852 (aged 58)
- Known for: Botanical illustrations
- Father: Louis Claude Marie Richard
- Scientific career
- Fields: Botanist, botanical illustrator, physician
- Author abbrev. (botany): A.Rich.

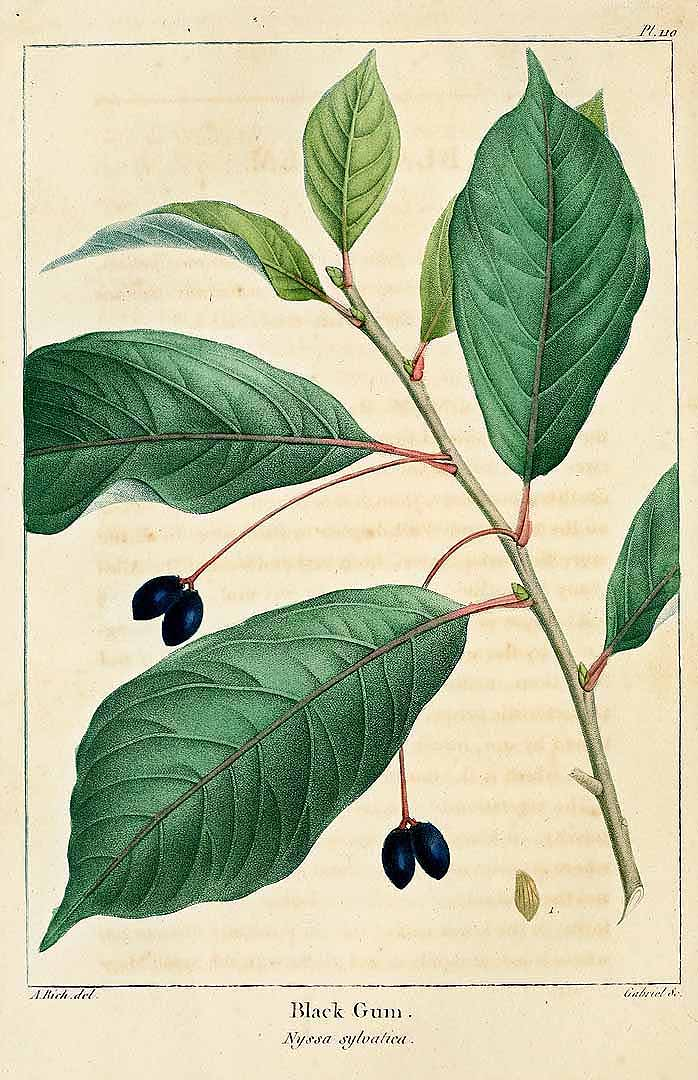
Nyssa sylvatica Marshall

Achille Richard (27 April 1794 – 5 October 1852) was a French botanist, botanical illustrator and physician. The standard author abbreviation A.Rich. is used to indicate this person as the author when citing a botanical name.

== Biography ==
Achille was the son of the botanist Louis-Claude Marie Richard (1754–1821). (Note: Other botanists called Richard include: Louis-Claude Marie Richard (1754–1821), his father (L.C.R.Rich); Jean Michel Claude Richard (1784–1868) (J.M.C.Rich); Olivier Jules Richard (1836–1896) (O.J.Rich); Claude Richard fl.(C.Rich); Joseph Herve Pierre Richard (J.H.P.Rich)) He was a pharmacist in the French navy, and a member of several well-known societies of that time. He became a leading botanist, and his books remain valued for their clarity and precision.

On 24 February 1834 he was made a member of the French Academy of Sciences (Botanical Section). He was also a member of the French National Academy of Medicine. He studied and described several genera of orchids that take his abbreviation in the generic name, among them Ludisia.

== Works ==
- 1819 Nouveaux Éléments de Botanique (New Elements of Botany), Paris. (11th Edition, 1876, available online at Gallica)
- 1820 Monographie du genre Hydrocotyle de la famille des ombellifères. (Monograph of genus Hydrocotyle of the family Umbelliferae (or Apiaceae) (available online at Gallica)
- 1828 Monographie des orchidées des îles de France et de Bourbon (Monograph of orchids of the islands of France and Réunion),
- 1829 Mémoire sur la famille des rubiacées contenant la description générale de cette famille et les caractères des genres qui la composent (Memory on the family Rubiaceae, containing the general description of this family and characters of genera that compose it), (available online at Gallica)
- 1832 Essai d'un Flore de la Nouvelle-Zelande, part 1 of Voyage de découvertes de l'Astrolabe ... botanique (credited as A. Richard)
- 1839–1843,Voyage en Abyssinie, a natural history
- 1845 Histoire Physique, Politique et Naturelle de L'Ile de Cuba (Ed. Sagra, Ramón de la). Botanique. Plantes Vasculaires. (Physical, Political and Natural History of the island of Cuba, Botany. Vascular plants.) (available online at Gallica)
