= List of botanists =

This is a list of botanists who have Wikipedia articles, in alphabetical order by surname. The List of botanists by author abbreviation is mostly a list of plant taxonomists because an author receives a standard abbreviation only when that author originates a new plant name.

Botany is one of the few sciences which has had, since the Middle Ages, substantial participation by women.

== A ==
- Erik Acharius (1757–1819)
- Julián Acuña Galé (1900–1973)
- Johann Friedrich Adam (1780–1838)
- Carl Adolph Agardh (1785–1859)
- Jacob Georg Agardh (1813–1901)
- Nikolaus Ager (1568–1634)
- William Aiton (1731–1793)
- Frédéric-Louis Allamand (1736–1809)
- Ruth F. Allen (1879–1963)
- Carlo Allioni (1728–1804)
- Lucile Allorge (1937–2023)
- Prospero Alpini (1553–1617)
- Benjamin Alvord (1813–1884)
- Adeline Ames (1879–1976)
- Janaki Ammal (1897–1984)
- Eliza Frances Andrews (1840–1931)
- Agnes Arber (1879–1960)
- Giovanni Arcangeli (1840–1921)
- David Ashton (1927–2005)
- William Guybon Atherstone (1814–1898)
- Anna Atkins (1799–1871)
- Daniel E. Atha (b. 1962)
- Armen Takhtajan (1910–2009)

== B ==
- Ernest Brown Babcock (1877–1954)
- Churchill Babington (1821–1889)
- Curt Backeberg (1894–1966)
- James Eustace Bagnall (1830–1918)
- Jacob Whitman Bailey (1811–1857)
- Liberty Hyde Bailey (1858–1954)
- Ibn al-Baitar (1197–1248)
- Giovanni Battista Balbis (1765–1831)
- John Hutton Balfour (1808–1884)
- Joseph Banks (1743–1820)
- César Barbosa (b. 1954)
- Bryan Alwyn Barlow (b. 1933)
- Friedrich Gottlieb Bartling (1798–1875)
- Benjamin Smith Barton (1766–1815)
- John Bartram (1699–1777)
- William Bartram (1739–1823)
- Johann Bauhin (1541–1613)
- Gaspard Bauhin (1560–1624)
- Chauncey Beadle (1866–1950)
- William James Beal (1833–1924)
- Janice C. Beatley (1919–1987)
- Rolla Kent Beattie (1875–1960)
- Johann Matthäus Bechstein (1757–1822)
- Richard Henry Beddome (1830–1911)
- Martinus Beijerinck (1851–1931)
- David Bellamy (1933–2019)
- Pierre Belon (1517–1564)
- George Bentham (1800–1884)
- Robert Bentley (1821–1893)
- Miles Joseph Berkeley (1803–1889)
- Karl August von Bergen (1704–1759)
- Johann Jakob Bernhardi (1774–1850)
- Edward W. Berry (1875–1945)
- Antonio Bertoloni (1775–1869)
- Wilibald Swibert Joseph Gottlieb von Besser (1784–1842)
- Clarence Bicknell (1842–1918)
- Friedrich August Marschall von Bieberstein (1768–1826)
- Jacob Bigelow (1787–1879)
- John Milton Bigelow (1804–1878)
- Gustaf Johan Billberg (1772–1844)
- Gottlieb Wilhelm Bischoff (1797–1854)
- Johannes Bisse (1935–1984)
- Francisco Manuel Blanco (1779–1845)
- John Bradby Blake (1745–1773)
- William Faris Blakely (1875–1941)
- Andrew Bloxam (1801–1878)
- Carl Ludwig Blume (1796–1862)
- Tyge W. Böcher (1909–1983)
- Jane Haskett Bock
- Hieronymus Bock (1498–1554)
- Herman Boerhaave (1668–1738)
- Wenceslas Bojer (1795–1856)
- Henry Nicholas Bolander (1831–1897)
- Harry Bolus (1834–1911)
- August Gustav Heinrich von Bongard (1786–1839)
- Charles Bonnet (1720–1793)
- Aimé Bonpland (1773–1858)
- Francis Boott (1792–1863)
- Evelyn Booth (1897–1988)
- Attila Borhidi (b. 1932)
- Antonina Georgievna Borissova (1903–1970)
- Frederik Børgesen (1866–1956)
- David Bowman (1838–1868)
- Richard Bradley (1688–1732)
- Alexander Braun (1805–1877)
- John Patrick Micklethwait Brenan (1917–1985)
- William Henry Brewer (1828–1910)
- Samuel Elisée Bridel-Brideri (1761–1828)
- Charles-François Brisseau de Mirbel (1776–1854)
- Elizabeth Gertrude Britton (1858–1934)
- Nathaniel Lord Britton (1859–1934)
- Giovanni Battista Brocchi (1772–1826)
- Adolphe Theodore Brongniart (1801–1876)
- Nicholas Edward Brown (1849–1934)
- Robert Brown (1773–1858)
- Patrick Browne (1720–1790)
- Jeremy James Bruhl (b. 1956)
- Louis-Ovide Brunet (1826–1876)
- Francis Buchanan-Hamilton (1762–1829)
- Alexander von Bunge (1803–1890)
- Elsa Beata Bunge (1734–1819)
- Luther Burbank (1849–1926)
- Frederick William Burbidge (1847–1905)
- William John Burchell (1781–1863)
- Alan Burges (1911–2002)
- David Burke (1854–1897)
- Joseph Burke II (1812–1873)
- Johannes Burman (1707–1780)
- Nicolaas Laurens Burman (1734–1793)
- Elizaveta Aleksandrovna Busch (1886–1960)
- Maarten Buysman (1856–1919)

== C ==
- Cleofé Caldéron (1929–2007)
- Albert Callay (1822–1896)
- George Caley (1770–1829)
- Ella Orr Campbell (1910–2003)
- Rudolf Jakob Camerarius (1665–1721)
- Aimée Antoinette Camus (1879–1965)
- Augustin Pyramus de Candolle (A. P. de Candolle) (1778–1841)
- Alphonse Pyrame de Candolle (A. de Candolle) (1806–1893)
- Richard Émile Augustin de Candolle (Aug. de Candolle) (1868–1920)
- J. F. M. Cannon (1930–2008)
- Sherwin Carlquist (1930–2021)
- Cedric Errol Carr (1892–1936)
- Elie-Abel Carrière (1818–1896)
- George Washington Carver (1864–1943)
- Henri Cassini (1781–1832)
- William Casson (1796–1886)
- Antonio José Cavanilles (1745–1804)
- Andrea Cesalpino (1524–1603)
- Adelbert von Chamisso (1781–1838)
- Daniel Chamovitz (b. 1963)
- Pierre Gaspard Chaumette (1763–1794)
- Wan Chun Cheng (1908–1987)
- Henry Chesterton (1837–1883)
- Carl Christensen (1872–1942)
- Joseph Philippe de Clairville (1742–1830)
- Arthur Roy Clapham (1904–1990)
- Lynn G. Clark (b. 1956)
- Adrienne Clarke (b. 1938)
- Gertrude Clarke Nuttall (1867–1929)
- Jens Clausen (1891–1969)
- Jane Colden (1724–1766)
- Runar Collander (1894–1973)
- Peter Collinson (1694–1768)
- Charles Coltman-Rogers (1854–1929)
- Philibert Commerçon (1727–1773)
- Joseph Whipple Congdon (1834–1910)
- Valerius Cordus (1515–1544)
- Giacomo Antonio Cortuso (1513–1603)
- Arthur Disbrowe Cotton (1879–1962)
- Heinrich Johann Nepomuk von Crantz (1722–1799)
- Arthur Cronquist (1919–1992)
- José Cuatrecasas (1903–1996)
- Nicholas Culpeper (1616–1654)
- Francesco Cupani (1657–1710)
- Ed Currie (b. 1963)
- Charles Curtis (1853–1928)
- William Curtis (1746–1799)
- Pierre Cusson (1727–1783)

== D ==
- Anders Dahl (1751–1789)
- Antoine-Tristan Danty d'Isnard (1663–1743)
- John M. Darby (1804–1877)
- Frederick Hamilton Davey (1868–1915)
- Armand David (1826–1900)
- Walter Davis (1847–1930)
- Anton de Bary (1831–1888)
- Joseph Decaisne (1807–1882)
- Ethel de Fraine (1879–1918)
- Pierre Jean Marie Delavay (1834–1895)
- Jules Paul Benjamin Delessert (1773–1847)
- Stefano delle Chiaje (1794–1860)
- Giuseppe De Notaris (1805–1877)
- René Louiche Desfontaines (1750–1833)
- Narcisse Henri François Desportes (1776–1856)
- Louis Auguste Joseph Desrousseaux (1753–1838)
- Nicaise Auguste Desvaux (1784–1856)
- Johann Jacob Dillenius (1684–1747)
- Kurt Dinter (1868–1945)
- Pedanius Dioscorides (c. 40–90)
- Kingsley Dixon (b. 1954)
- Rembert Dodoens (1517–1585)
- David Don (1799–1841)
- George Don (1798–1856)
- James Donn (1758–1813)
- Catharina Helena Dörrien (1717–1795)
- David Douglas (1799–1834)
- John Dransfield (b. 1945)
- Robert Louis Dressler (1927–2019)
- Jonas C. Dryander (1748–1810)
- Heber Drury (1819–1905)
- Jean Étienne Duby (1798–1885)
- Antoine Nicolas Duchesne (1747–1827)
- William Russell Dudley (1849–1911)
- Barthélemy Charles Joseph Dumortier (1797–1878)
- Michel Felix Dunal (1789–1856)
- Ursula Katherine Duncan (1910–1985)
- Stephen Troyte Dunn (1868–1938)
- Robert Allen Dyer (1900–1987)

== E ==
- Michael Pakenham Edgeworth (1812–1881)
- Henrik Franz Alexander von Eggers (1844–1903)
- Christian Gottfried Ehrenberg (1795–1876)
- Jakob Friedrich Ehrhart (1742–1795)
- Eva Ekeblad (1724–1786)
- Stephan Ladislaus Endlicher (1804–1849)
- George Engelmann (1809–1884)
- Adolf Engler (1844–1930)
- Andrey Erst
- Katherine Esau (1898–1997)
- Johann Friedrich von Eschscholtz (1793–1831)
- Constantin von Ettingshausen (1826–1897)
- Eleonora Gabrielian (b. 1929)

== F ==
- David Fairchild (1869–1954)
- Hugh Falconer (1808–1865)
- Reginald Farrer (1880–1920)
- Lewis J. Feldman (b. 1945)
- Luigi Fenaroli (1899–1980)
- Merritt Lyndon Fernald (1873–1950)
- Friedrich Ernst Ludwig von Fischer (1782–1854)
- Heinrich Gustav Flörke (1764–1835)
- Pius Font i Quer (1888–1964)
- Peter Forsskål (1732–1763)
- Georg Forster (1754–1794)
- Johann Reinhold Forster (1729–1798)
- Robert Fortune (1812–1880)
- Henry Georges Fourcade (1865–1948)
- Adrien René Franchet (1834–1900)
- William Douglas Francis (1889–1959)
- John C. Frémont (1813–1890)
- Elias Magnus Fries (1794–1878)
- Imre Frivaldszky (1799–1870)
- Charles Christopher Frost (1805–1880)
- Leonhart Fuchs (1501–1566)
- Heinrich Christian Funck (1771–1839)
- Catherine Furbish (1834–1931)

== G ==
- Eleonora Gabrielian (b. 1929)
- Joseph Gaertner (1732–1791)
- Karl Friedrich von Gaertner (1772–1850)
- Betsy Harrison Gagne (1947–2020)
- François Gagnepain (1866–1952)
- Ernest Edward Galpin (1858–1941)
- George Alexander Gammie (1864–1934)
- James Alexander Gammie (1839–1924)
- Charles Gaudichaud-Beaupré (1789–1854)
- Alwyn Howard Gentry (1945–1993)
- Howard Scott Gentry (1903–1993)
- John Gerard (1545–1612)
- Conrad von Gesner (1516–1565)
- Luca Ghini (1490–1556)
- Ken Gillanders (b. 1930)
- Charles Henry Gimingham (1923–2018)
- Johann Friedrich Gmelin (1748–1804)
- Johann Georg Gmelin (1709–1755)
- Samuel Gottlieb Gmelin (1744–1774)
- Hossein Gol-e-Golab (1895–1985)
- George Gordon (1806–1879)
- Antoine Gouan (1733–1821)
- Asa Gray (1810–1888)
- Netta Elizabeth Gray (1913–1970)
- Robert Kaye Greville (1794–1866)
- Nehemiah Grew (1641–1712)
- William Griffith (1810–1845)
- Jan Frederik Gronovius (1690–1762)
- Wilhelm Gueinzius (1813–1874)
- Hugo Gunckel Lüer (1901–1997)
- Johann Ernst Gunnerus (1718–1773)
- Giovanni Gussone (1787–1866)
- Francis Guthrie (1831–1899)
- Guranda Gvaladze (1932–2020)

== H ==
- Ingebrigt Severin Hagen (1852–1917)
- Olaf Hagerup (1889–1961)
- Hiroshi Hara (1911–1986)
- Thora Hardy (1902–1993)
- Inez M. Haring (1875–1968)
- Robert Almer Harper (1862–1946)
- Cornelia Hermina van Harreveld-Lako (1883–1945)
- Karl Theodor Hartweg (1812–1871)
- William Henry Harvey (1811–1866)
- Adrian Hardy Haworth (1767–1833)
- John Stevens Henslow (1796–1861)
- Augustine Henry (1857–1930)
- Vernon Heywood (1927–2022)
- Mary MacLean Hindmarsh (1921–2000)
- Adriana Hoffmann (1940–2022)
- Johann Centurius Hoffmannsegg (1766–1849)
- Henri Homblé (1883–1921)
- Henrietta Hooker (1851–1929)
- Joseph Dalton Hooker (1817–1911)
- William Jackson Hooker (1785–1865)
- Josiah Hoopes (1832–1904)
- Albert Howard (1873–1947)
- Gabrielle Howard (1876–1930)
- Armando Theodoro Hunziker (1919–2001)
- John Hutchinson (1884–1972)

== I ==
- Agnes Ibbetson (1757–1823)
- Jane Ingham (1897–1982)
- Keisuke Ito (1803–1901)

== J ==
- Vello Jaaska (b. 1936)
- Vilve Jaaska (fl. 1990)
- Victor Jacquemont (1801–1832)
- Nikolaus Joseph von Jacquin (1727–1817)
- Joseph Franz von Jacquin (1766–1839)
- Shri Mohan Jain (b. 1949)
- Knud Jessen (1884–1971)
- Wilhelm Johannsen (1857–1927)
- Lawrence Alexander Sidney Johnson (1925–1997)
- Ivan Murray Johnston (1898–1960)
- Adrien-Henri de Jussieu (1797–1853)
- Antoine Laurent de Jussieu (1748–1836)
- Antoine de Jussieu (1686–1758)
- Bernard de Jussieu (1699–1777)

== K ==
- Kaibara Ekiken (1630–1714)
- Guillermo Kalbreyer (1847–1912)
- Pehr Kalm (1716–1779)
- Gustav Karl Wilhelm Hermann Karsten (1817–1908)
- Kailas Nath Kaul (1905–1983)
- Sir Frederick Keeble (1870–1952)
- Albert Kellogg (1813–1887)
- George Clayton Kennedy (1919–1980)
- Alice L. Kibbe (1881–1969)
- Franz Kiggelaer
- Kanhoba Ranchoddas Kirtikar (1849–1917)
- Masao Kitagawa (1910–1995)
- Karl Koch (1809–1879)

== L ==
- Jacques Labillardière (1755–1834)
- Hans Lambers (1950–)
- Dorothy van Dyke Leake (1893–1990)
- Lars Levi Laestadius (1800–1861)
- Jean-Baptiste Lamarck (1744–1829)
- Aylmer Bourke Lambert (1761–1842)
- Jean Vincent Félix Lamouroux (1779–1825)
- Gerhard Lang (1924–2016)
- Kai Larsen (1926–2012)
- Joseph Bory Latour-Marliac (1830–1911)
- Charles de l'Écluse (1526–1609)
- Jean Baptiste Leschenault de la Tour (1773–1826)
- Emmanuel Liais (1826–1900)
- John Lindley (1799–1865)
- Johann Heinrich Friedrich Link (1767–1851)
- Carlos Adolfo Lehnebach
- Carl Linnaeus (1707–1778)
- Carolus Linnaeus the Younger (1741–1783)
- William Richardson Linton (1850–1908)
- Pablo de la Llave (1773–1833)
- David Lloyd (1937–2006)
- Thomas Lobb (1817–1894)
- William Lobb (1809–1864)
- George Loddiges (1784/1786–1846)
- Jean-Louis-Auguste Loiseleur-Deslongchamps (1774–1849)
- Harri Lorenzi (b. 1949)
- A.S. Losina-Losinskaja (1903–1958)
- John Claudius Loudon (1782–1843)
- Alice Lounsberry (1868–1949)
- Elias Lönnrot (1802–1884)
- Hedvig Lovén (1867–1943)
- Hans Christian Lyngbye (1782–1837)

== M ==
- William McCalla (1814–1849)
- Elizabeth McClintock (1912–2004)
- John M. MacDougal (b. 1954)
- Terry Desmond Macfarlane (b. 1953)
- Elke Mackenzie (1911–1990)
- John Macoun (1831–1920)
- Peter MacOwan (1830–1909)
- Rogers McVaugh (1909–2009)
- Aime Mäemets (1930–1996)
- Pierre Magnol (1638–1715)
- Joseph Maiden (1859–1925)
- Marcello Malpighi (1628–1694)
- Gustav Mann (1836–1916)
- Charles Maries (1851–1902)
- Jesse Jarue Mark (1906–1971)
- Rudolf Marloth (1855–1931)
- Humphry Marshall (1722–1801)
- William Keble Martin (1877–1969)
- Carl Friedrich Philipp von Martius (1794–1868)
- John Martyn (1699–1768)
- Genkei Masamune (1899–1993)
- Francis Masson (1741–1805)
- Austin Mast (b. 1972)
- Carl Maximowicz (1827–1891)
- Friedrich Kasimir Medikus (1738–1808)
- Gregor Mendel (1822–1884)
- Giuseppe Giovanni Antonio Meneghini (1811–1889)
- Archibald Menzies (1754–1842)
- Konstantin Merezhkovsky (1855–1921)
- Franz Meyen (1804–1840)
- Carl Anton von Meyer (1795–1855)
- André Michaux (1746–1802)
- Pier Antonio Micheli (1679–1737)
- John Miller (1715–c.1792)
- Philip Miller (1691–1771)
- Charles Frederick Millspaugh (1854–1923)
- Friedrich Anton Wilhelm Miquel (1811–1871)
- Charles-François Brisseau de Mirbel (1776–1854)
- John Mitchell (1711–1768)
- Conrad Moench (1744–1805)
- Hugo von Mohl (1805–1872)
- Charles Theodore Mohr (1824–1901)
- Paul Möhring (1710–1792)
- Camille Montagne (1784–1866)
- George Thomas Moore (1871–1956)
- Giuseppe Moretti (1782–1853)
- Giuseppe Giacinto Moris (1796–1869)
- Robert Morison (1620–1683)
- Elizabeth Carrington Morris (1795–1865)
- Józef Motyka (1900–1984)
- Valiollah Mozaffarian (born 1953)
- Ferdinand von Mueller (1825–1896)
- Cornelius Herman Muller (1909–1997)
- Otto von Münchhausen (1716–1774)

== N ==
- Karl Wilhelm von Nageli (1817–1891)
- P. K. K. Nair (1930–2017)
- George Valentine Nash (1864–1921)
- Christian Gottfried Daniel Nees von Esenbeck (1776–1858)
- Charles F. Newcombe (1851–1924)
- Frank Newhook (1918–1999)
- Margaret Newton (1887–1971)
- Louis Nicolas (1634–1682?)
- Daniel Lee Nickrent (b. 1956)
- Emilia Frances Noel (1868–1950)
- Thomas Nuttall (1786–1859)

== O ==
- Carl Hansen Ostenfeld (1873–1931)
- Daniel Oliver (1830–1916)
- Garcia de Orta (1501–1568)
- Giuseppe Olivi (1769–1795)
- William Oakes (botanist) (1799–1848)

== P ==
- Alf Erling Porsild (1901–1977)
- Carl Borivoj Presl (1794–1852)
- Charles Christopher Parry (1823–1890)
- Charles Plumier (1646–1704)
- Christian Hendrik Persoon (1761–1836)
- Cyrus Pringle (1838–1911)
- Donald C. Peattie (1898–1964)
- Eduard Friedrich Poeppig (1798–1868)
- Eduard Pospichal (1838–1905)
- Edward Palmer (1829–1911)
- Filippo Parlatore (1816–1877)
- Flora Wambaugh Patterson (1847–1928)
- Frederick Traugott Pursh (1774–1820)
- George E. Post (1838–1909)
- George R. Proctor (1920–2015)
- Ghillean Prance (b. 1937)
- Henri François Pittier (1857–1950)
- Henri Perrier de la Bâthie (1873–1958)
- Herman Silas Pepoon (1860–1941)
- Illtyd Buller Pole-Evans (1879–1968)
- Isaac-Bénédict Prévost (1755–1819)
- James Petiver (c. 1665–c. 1718)
- Jan Svatopluk Presl (1791–1849)
- Jean Louis Marie Poiret (1755–1834)
- Jean-Marie Pelt (1933–2015)
- Joel Roberts Poinsett (1779–1851)
- Josif Pancic (1814–1888)
- Joseph Hubert Priestley (1883–1944)
- Karl Julius Perleb (1794–1845)
- Leonard Plukenet (1641–1706)
- Louis Alexandre Henri Joseph Piré (1827–1887)
- Ludwig Preiss (1811–1883)
- Michael Proctor (1929–2017)
- Morten Pedersen Porsild (1872–1956)
- Nathanael Pringsheim (1823–1894)
- Ove Paulsen (1874–1947)
- Palisot de Beauvois (1752–1820)
- Paul Petard (1912–1980)
- Paul Émile de Puydt (1810–1891)
- Peter Simon Pallas (1741–1811)
- Pliny the Elder (23/24–79)
- Richard Pearce (c. 1835–1868)
- Rodolfo Amando Philippi (1808–1904)
- Ruth Patrick (1907–2013)
- Thomas Conrad Porter (1822–1901)
- William Hunt Painter (1835–1910)
- William Paterson (1755–1810)
- William Purdom (1880–1921)
- Ciro Pollini (1782–1833)

== Q ==
- Agnes J. Quirk (1884–1974)

== R ==
- Achille Richard (1794–1852)
- Albert Ernest Radford (1918–2006)
- Albrecht Wilhelm Roth (1757–1834)
- Antoine Risso (alias: Antonio Giuseppe Risso) (1777–1845)
- Augustus Quirinus Rivinus (1652–1723)
- Christen C. Raunkiær (1860–1938)
- Constantine Samuel Rafinesque (1738–1840)
- Elizabeth Seymour Rawlinson (1901–1942)
- Frans Hubert Edouard Arthur Walter Robyns (1901–1986)
- Gabriele Rabel (1880–1963)
- Georg Eberhard Rumphius (1627–1702)
- Gustaf Otto Rosenberg (1872–1948)
- Hanna Resvoll-Holmsen (1873–1943)
- Harold E. Robinson (1932–2020)
- Heinrich Gustav Reichenbach (1823–1889)
- Henry Nicholas Ridley (1855–1956)
- Johann Jacob Roemer (1763–1819)
- John Ralfs (1807–1890)
- John Ray (1627–1705)
- José Manuel Restrepo Vélez (1781–1863)
- Joseph Rock (1884–1962)
- Julien Reverchon (1837–1905)
- Lauritz Kolderup Rosenvinge (1858–1939)
- Lincoln Ware Riddle (1880–1921)
- Louis Claude Richard (1754–1821)
- Ludwig Reichenbach (1793–1879)
- Oliver Rackham (1939–2015)
- Per Axel Rydberg (1860–1931)
- Peter H. Raven (1936–2026)
- Thekla Resvoll (1871–1948)
- Tony Rodd (b. 1940)
- Werner Rothmaler (1908–1962)
- William Roxburgh (1751–1815)

== S ==
- Joseph Sabine (1770–1837)
- Julius von Sachs (1832–1897)
- József Sadler (1791–1849)
- Thiodolf Saelan (1834–1921)
- Augustin Saint-Hilaire (1779–1853)
- Edward James Salisbury (1886–1978)
- Richard Anthony Salisbury (1761–1829)
- Richard Sanders Rogers (1861–1942)
- Gaetano Savi (1769–1844)
- Charles Sprague Sargent (1841–1927)
- Henry Parker Sartwell (1792–1867)
- William Saunders (1822–1900)
- Horace-Bénédict de Saussure (1740–1799)
- Andreas Franz Wilhelm Schimper (1856–1901)
- Christian Schkuhr (1741–1811)
- Diederich Franz Leonhard von Schlechtendal (1794–1866)
- Rudolf Schlechter (1872–1925)
- Matthias Jakob Schleiden (1804–1881)
- George Schoener (1864–1941)
- Selmar Schonland (1860–1940)
- Heinrich Wilhelm Schott (1794–1865)
- Heinrich Schrader (1767–1836)
- Franz von Paula Schrank (1747–1835)
- Josef August Schultes (1773–1831)
- Christian Friedrich Schwägrichen (1775–1853)
- Ian Schwartz
- Georg August Schweinfurth (1836–1925)
- Giovanni Antonio Scopoli (1723–1788)
- Berthold Carl Seemann (1825–1871)
- Prideaux John Selby (1788–1867)
- Jean Senebier (1742–1806)
- Nicolas Charles Seringe (1776–1858)
- Martín Sessé y Lacasta (1751–1808)
- John Adolph Shafer (1863–1918)
- Carl Sharsmith (1903–1994)
- Helen Sharsmith (1905–1982)
- George Shaw (1751–1813)
- Alice Albertson Shurrocks (1880 - 1967)
- Shen Kuo (1031–1095)
- John Sibthorp (1758–1796)
- Franz Sieber (1789–1844)
- Philipp Franz von Siebold (1796–1866)
- Thomas Robertson Sim (1858–1938)
- Cuthbert John Skead (1912–2006)
- John Kunkel Small (1869–1938)
- Mikhail Nikolaevich Smirnov (1847–1892)
- Christo Albertyn Smith (1898–1956)
- Edith Philip Smith (1897–1976)
- James Edward Smith (1759–1828)
- Johannes Jacobus Smith (1867–1947)
- Winifred Smith (1858–1925)
- Lumina Cotton Riddle Smyth (1871–1939)
- Daniel Solander (1733–1782)
- Otto Wilhelm Sonder (1812–1881)
- Pierre Sonnerat (1748–1814)
- Effie A. Southworth (1860–1947)
- Roger David Spencer (b. 1945)
- Kurt Sprengel (1766–1833)
- Richard Spruce (1817–1893)
- Herman Spöring (1733–1771)
- Clive Stace (b. 1938)
- Agustín Stahl (1842–1917)
- Elvin C. Stakman (1885–1979)
- Paul Carpenter Standley (1884–1963)
- G. Ledyard Stebbins (1906–2000)
- Berthold Stein (1847–1899)
- Georg Wilhelm Steller (1709–1746)
- Kaspar Maria von Sternberg (1761–1838)
- Julian Alfred Steyermark (1909–1988)
- Jonathan Stokes (c. 1755–1831)
- Eduard Strasburger (1844–1912)
- George Bishop Sudworth (1864–1927)
- Su Song (1020–1101)
- Olof Swartz (1760–1818)
- Simon Syrenius (1540–1611)

== T ==
- Hisayoshi Takeda (aka Takeda Hisayoshi) (1883–1972)
- Armen Takhtajan (1910–2009)
- Arthur Tansley (1871–1955)
- Ignaz Friedrich Tausch (1793–1848)
- John Templeton (1766–1825)
- Michele Tenore (1780–1861)
- Theophrastus (c. 371–c. 287 BC)
- William Turner Thiselton-Dyer (1843–1928)
- Graham Stuart Thomas (1909–2003)
- William Thompson (1805–1852)
- George Thomson (1819–1878)
- Robert Folger Thorne (1920–2015)
- Louis-Marie Aubert du Petit-Thouars (1758–1831)
- Carl Peter Thunberg (1743–1828)
- Agostino Todaro (1818–1892)
- John Torrey (1796–1873)
- Joseph Pitton de Tournefort (1656–1708)
- John Tradescant the elder (c. 1570s–1638)
- John Tradescant the younger (1608–1662)
- Ernst Rudolf von Trautvetter (1809–1889)
- Carl Bernhard von Trinius (1778–1844)
- Mikhail Tsvet (1872–1919)
- Edward Tuckerman (1817–1886)
- William Turner (1509/10–1568)
- Tom Tutin (1908–1987)

== U ==
- Bernardino da Ucria (1739–1796)
- Lucien Marcus Underwood (1853–1907)
- Ignatz Urban (1848–1931)

== V ==
- Martin Vahl (1749–1804)
- Sébastien Vaillant (1669–1722)
- David H. Valentine (1912–1987)
- Ina Vandebroek
- Domenico Vandelli (1735–1816)
- Elizabeth Van Volkenburgh (b. 1952)
- Nikolai Vavilov (1887–1943)
- Harry Veitch (1840–1924)
- John Gould Veitch (1839–1870)
- Peter Veitch (1850–1929)
- Romina Vidal-Russell
- Dominique Villars (1745–1814)
- Domenico Viviani (1772–1840)
- Mikhail Stepanovich Voronin (1838–1903)

== W ==
- Warren H. Wagner (1920–2000)
- Göran Wahlenberg (1780–1851)
- Franz de Paula Adam von Waldstein (1759–1823)
- George Arnott Walker-Arnott (1799–1868)
- Nathaniel Wallich (1786–1854)
- Gustav Wallis (1830–1878)
- Karl Friedrich Wilhelm Wallroth (1792–1857)
- E. F. Warburg (1908–1966)
- Harry Marshall Ward (1854–1906)
- Eugenius Warming (1841–1924)
- Sereno Watson (1826–1892)
- William Watson (1715–1787)
- Wang Wencai (1926–2022)
- Heinrich Wawra von Fernsee (1831–1887)
- Randy Wayne (biologist) (b. 1955)
- Philip Barker Webb (1793–1854)
- Georg Heinrich Weber (1752–1828)
- Christian Ehrenfried Weigel (1748–1831)
- Friedrich Welwitsch (1806–1872)
- George Stephen West (1876–1919)
- William West (1848–1914)
- William West Jr (1875–1901)
- Herbert Hice Whetzel (1877–1944)
- August Wilhelm Eberhard Christoph Wibel (1775–1814)
- Lilly Wigg (1749–1828)
- Johan Emanuel Wikström (1789–1856)
- Carl Ludwig Willdenow (1765–1812)
- Ernest Henry Wilson (1876–1930)
- William Withering (1741–1799)
- Anthony Hurt Wolley-Dod (1861–1948)
- Alphonso Wood (1810–1881)
- John Medley Wood (1827–1915)
- Charles Wright (1811–1885)
- Franz Xavier von Wulfen (1728–1805)
- Heinrich Wullschlägel (1805–1864)
- Heinrich Wydler (1800–1883)
- Ben-Erik van Wyk (b. 1956)

== X ==
- Hu Xiansu (1894–1968)

== Y ==
- Gennady Yakovlev (1938–2024)

== Z ==
- Milton Zaitlin (1927–2016)
- Kadir Zakirovič Zakirov (1906–1992)
- Giovanni Zanardini (1804–1878)
- Amparo de Zeledón (1870–1951)
- Karl Ludwig Philipp Zeyher (1799–1858)
- Daniel Zohary (1926–2016)
- Michael Zohary (1898–1983)
- Scott Zona (b. 1959)
- Joseph Gerhard Zuccarini (1797–1848)
- Joy Zedler (b. 1943)

== See also ==
- List of women botanists
- List of botanists by author abbreviation
- List of authors of South African botanical taxa
- List of gardener-botanist explorers of the Enlightenment
- List of Hungarian botanists
- List of Russian biologists
- List of Slovenian botanists
