= Gammie =

Gammie is a Scottish surname. Notable people with the surname include:

- James Alexander Gammie (1839–1924), Scottish botanist
- George Gammie (1864–1935), British botanist, James' son
- Ellen Gammie (1985-Present), Celebrity on Australian TV programme "Farmer Wants a Wife"
