= Lionel de Nicéville =

British entomologist (1852–1901)

Charles Lionel Augustus de Nicéville (1852 in Bristol – 3 December 1901 in Calcutta from malaria) was a curator at the Indian Museum in Calcutta (now Kolkata). He studied the butterflies of the Indian subcontinent and wrote a three volume monograph on the butterflies of India, Bangladesh, Nepal, Burma and Sri Lanka. He also studied the mantids of the Oriental region.

== Biography ==
Born in a noble Huguenot family, his father was a physician. He was educated at St. John's College at Hurstpierpoint near Brighton. Leaving England for India in 1870, de Nicéville became a clerk in a government office (Calcutta Small Cause Court) but from at least 1881, devoted all of his spare time to entomology. He worked with most 'Indian' entomologists of the day but especially with Henry John Elwes, Taylor, Wood–Mason, Martin and Marshall. At this time, he made several trips to Sikkim. In 1887 he made a trip to the Baltistan glaciers along with John Henry Leech. He made collections on these trips and wrote a series of papers in the Journal of the Royal Asiatic Society of Bengal (1881, 1882, 1883 and 1885) and in 1890 the results were summarised in the Gazetteer of Sikhim (1890) in which G. A Gammie and De Niceville recorded about 631 species of butterflies found in Sikkim. Also included were butterflies found in Darjeeling, Buxa and Bhutan, areas contiguous with Sikkim. In 1892 he proposed a new genus of skipper butterflies, Crossiura, in an article in the Journal of the Bombay Natural History Society.

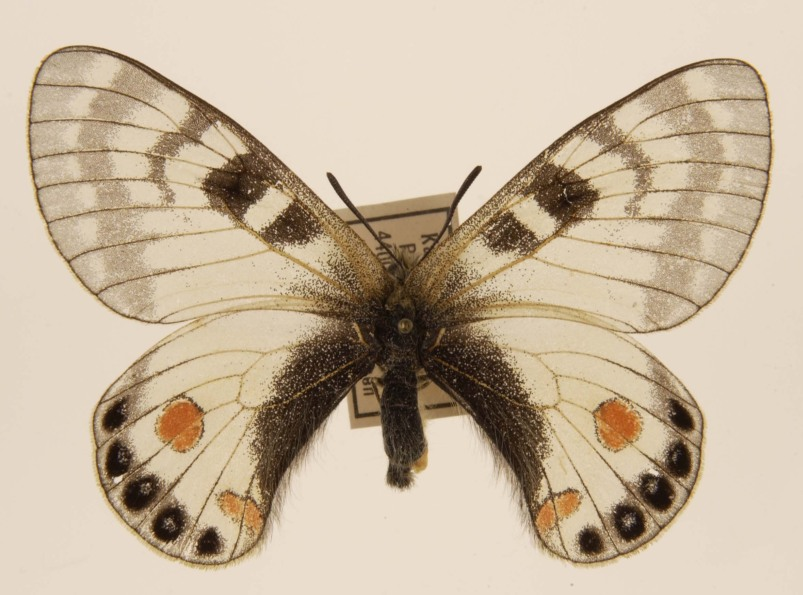
Parnassius stoliczkanus ssp. nicevilli

1899 was a year of great famine coinciding with George Nathaniel Curzon's appointment as Viceroy of India. Curzon was hugely energetic and supportive of government efforts to help agriculture. "Our real reform has been to endeavour for the first time to apply science on a large scale to the study and practice of Indian agriculture." he wrote in 1901. Curzon began in 1901 by elevating the Bombay director of agriculture to the new position of inspector-general of agriculture. Curzon also undertook the expansion of provincial research, linked to districts by experiment as well as demonstration farms. In 1901 he appointed an imperial mycologist and an imperial entomologist; two years later, he appointed an imperial agriculturalist and an imperial economic botanist. The entomologist was de Nicéville, who whilst a lepidopterist was able to co-ordinate work on other insect orders. One of his major works was on the Mantodea of the Oriental region.

He was a Corresponding Member of the Zoological Society of London and a Fellow of the Entomological Society.

He married Jane Sarah Webb, a widow, at St James' Church Calcutta on 21 September 1881. Their only child, Nora De Niceville, was born in Calcutta on 25 August 1882.

Lionel died of malaria contracted while travelling in the Terai region.

== Works ==
Partial list:

- 1883 with G. F. L. Marshall. "Butterflies of India, Burmah and Ceylon". Vol. 1. Repr. 1979, New Delhi, 327 pp.
- 1886. "The Butterflies of India, Burmah and Ceylon". Vol. 2. Repr. 1979, New Delhi, 332 pp.
- 1890. "The butterflies of India, Burmah and Ceylon". Vol. 3. Repr. 1979, New Delhi, 503 pp.
- 1892. "On new and little known Butterflies from the Indo-Malayan region", Journal of the Bombay Natural History Society 7: 322-356.
- 1894 "On new and little-known butterflies from the Indo-Malayan region" J. Asiat. Soc. Bengal (II) 63 (1): 1–59, pls. 1–5
- 1898 "On new and little-known butterflies from the Indo-Malayan, Austro-Malayan and Australian Regions" Journal of the Bombay Natural History Society 12 (1): 131–161, 4 pls.
- 1900 "On new and little-known Lepidoptera from the Oriental region". Journal of the Bombay Natural History Society 13, 157–176, 3 pl. (174).

== Collection ==
Part of de Nicéville's butterfly collection was given to the Asiatic Society, Calcutta in 1880. Other parts were given, in 1902 to the Indian Museum in Calcutta and to the Peter Redpath Museum in Montreal.
