= List of plants discovered by Eleonora Gabrielian =

This is a list of all plants identified by Eleonora Gabrielian, sorted by family.

· Amaryllidaceae Galanthus artjuschenkoae Gabrieljan—Fl. Rastitel'nost' Rast. Res. Arm. 12: 13 (1999). (IK)

· Asteraceae Amberboa gubanovii Gabrieljan—Takhtajania 1: 37. 2011

· Asteraceae Amberboa takhtajanii Gabrieljan—Takhtajania 1: 36. 2011

· Asteraceae Carthamus tamamschjanae Gabrieljan—Fl., Rast. i Rast. Res. Arm. SSR (Sborn. Nauch. Trud.) 10: 21 (1987). (IK)

· Asteraceae Centaurea ahverdovii Gabrieljan—Fl. Rast. Rast. Res. Armenii (Sborn. Nauch. Trud. 13) 22 (1991). (IK)

· Asteraceae Centaurea araxina Gabrieljan—Novosti Sist. Vyssh. Rast. 25: 169 (1988). (IK)

· Asteraceae Centaurea caroli-henrici Gabrieljan & Dittrich—Candollea 48(1): 245 (1993). (IK)

· Asteraceae Centaurea cronquistii Takht. & Gabrieljan—Bot. Zhurn. (Moscow & Leningrad) 77(9): 65. 1992 (IK)

· Asteraceae Centaurea debedica Gabrieljan—Bot. Zhurn. (Moscow & Leningrad) 79(4): 123. 1994 (IK)

· Asteraceae Centaurea dittrichii Gabrieljan—Bot. Zhurn. (Moscow & Leningrad) 79(4): 125. 1994 (IK)

· Asteraceae Centaurea erivanensis Bordz. subsp. holargyrea (Bornm. & Woronow) Gabrieljan—Novosti Sist. Vyssh. Rast. 25: 163 (1988):. (IK)

· Asteraceae Centaurea fajvuschii Gabrieljan—Novosti Sist. Vyssh. Rast. 25: 164 (1988). (IK)

· Asteraceae Centaurea geghamensis Gabrieljan—Bot. Zhurn. (Moscow & Leningrad) 79(4): 122. 1994 (IK)

· Asteraceae Centaurea manakianii Gabrieljan—Bot. Zhurn. (Moscow & Leningrad) 79(4): 120. 1994 (IK)

· Asteraceae Centaurea popovae Gabrieljan—Bot. Zhurn. (Moscow & Leningrad) 79(4): 127. 1994 (IK)

· Asteraceae Centaurea pseudoscabiosa subsp. ossethica (Sosn.) Gabrieljan—Fl. Armen. 9: 416 (1995), as 'ossetica':. (IK)

· Asteraceae Centaurea stevenii subsp. armeniaca Gabrieljan—Fl. Armen. 9: 421 (1995), contrary to Art. 37.4 ICBN (1994). (IK)

· Asteraceae Centaurea takhtajanii Gabrieljan & Tonyan—Bot. Zhurn. (Moscow & Leningrad) 70(4): 515. 1985 (IK)

· Asteraceae Centaurea vavilovii Takht. & Gabrieljan—Bot. Zhurn. (Moscow & Leningrad) 72(12): 1657. 1987 (IK)

· Asteraceae Centaurea xanthocephala (DC.) Sch.Bip. subsp. xanthocephaloides (Tzvelev) Gabrieljan—Novosti Sist. Vyssh. Rast. 25: 168 (1988):. (IK)

· Asteraceae Centaurea zuvandica (Sosn.) Sosn. subsp. gegharkunikensis Gabrieljan—Bot. Zhurn. (Moscow & Leningrad) 79(4): 129. 1994 (IK)

· Asteraceae Centaurea zuvandica (Sosn.) Sosn. subsp. jelenevskyi Gabrieljan—Bot. Zhurn. (Moscow & Leningrad) 79(4): 128. 1994 (IK)

· Asteraceae Grossheimia ahverdovii (Gabrieljan) Gabrieljan—Fl. Armen. 9: 332 (1995):. (IK)

· Asteraceae Grossheimia caroli-henrici (Gabrieljan & Dittrich) Gabrieljan—Fl. Armen. 9: 332 (1995):. (IK)

· Asteraceae Psephellus araxinus (Gabrieljan) Greuter—Willdenowia 33(1): 59 (2003).

· Asteraceae Psephellus cronquistii (Takht. & Gabrieljan) Gabrieljan—Fl. Armen. 9: 352 (1995):. (IK)

· Asteraceae Psephellus debedicus (Gabrieljan) Gabrieljan—Fl. Armen. 9: 348 (1995):. (IK)

· Asteraceae Psephellus dittrichii (Gabrieljan) Gabrieljan—Fl. Armen. 9: 352 (1995):. (IK)

· Asteraceae Psephellus fajvuschii (Gabrieljan) Greuter—Willdenowia 33(1): 60 (2003).

· Asteraceae Psephellus geghamensis (Gabrieljan) Gabrieljan—Fl. Armen. 9: 345 (1995):. (IK)

· Asteraceae Psephellus manakyanii (Gabrieljan) Gabrieljan—Fl. Armen. 9: 345 (1995):. (IK)

· Asteraceae Psephellus meskheticus (Sosn.) Gabrieljan—Fl. Armen. 9: 351 (1995):. (IK)

· Asteraceae Psephellus popovae (Gabrieljan) Gabrieljan—Fl. Armen. 9: 352 (1995):. (IK)

· Asteraceae Psephellus zuvandicus Sosn. subsp. gegharkunikensis (Gabrieljan) Gabrieljan—Fl. Armen. 9: 345 (1995):. (IK)

· Asteraceae Psephellus zuvandicus Sosn. subsp. jelenevskyi (Gabrieljan) Gabrieljan—Fl. Armen. 9: 344 (1995):. (IK)

· Caryophyllaceae Acanthophyllum takhtajanii (Gabrieljan & Dittrich) A.Pirani & Rabeler—Taxon 67(1): 101. 2018 [6 Mar 2018]

· Caryophyllaceae Allochrusa takhtajanii Gabrieljan & Dittrich—Biol. Zhurn. Armenii 43(3): 184 (1990). (IK)

· Colchicaceae Colchicum gohariae Gabrieljan—Fl. Rastitel'nost' Rast. Res. Arm. 12: 16 (1999), as 'goharae'. (IK)

· Colchicaceae Colchicum greuteri (Gabrieljan) K.Perss.—Bot. Jahrb. Syst. 127(2): 222. 2007 [5 Dec 2007]

· Colchicaceae Colchicum mirzoevae (Gabrieljan) K.Perss.—Bot. Jahrb. Syst. 127(2): 222. 2007 [5 Dec 2007]

· Colchicaceae Merendera greuteri Gabrieljan—Fl. Rastitel'nost' Rast. Res. Arm. 12: 15 (1999). (IK)

· Colchicaceae Merendera mirzoevae Gabrieljan—Biol. Zhurn. Armenii 39(7): 582 (1986). (IK)

· Iridaceae Gladiolus hajastanicus Gabrieljan—Bocconea 13: 451 (30 March 2001). (IK)

· Iridaceae Gladiolus hajastanicus Gabrieljan—Fl. Armen. 10: 154 (2001). (IK)

· Iridaceae Gladiolus kotschyanus Boiss. subsp. distichus Gabrieljan—Bocconea 13: 451 (30 March 2001). (IK)

· Iridaceae Gladiolus kotschyanus Boiss. subsp. distichus Gabrieljan—Fl. Armen. 10: 154 (2001). (IK)

· Iridaceae Gladiolus menitskyi Gabrieljan—Bocconea 13: 454 (30 March 2001). (IK)

· Iridaceae Gladiolus menitzkyi Gabrieljan—Fl. Armen. 10: 160 (2001). (IK)

· Iridaceae Gladiolus szovitsii Grossh. subsp. pseudopersicus Ogan. & Gabrieljan—Bocconea 13: 453. 2001 [30 Mar 2001] (IK)

· Iridaceae Gladiolus szovitsii Grossh. subsp. pseudopersicus Ogan. & Gabrieljan—Fl. Armen. 10: 160 (2001). (IK)

· Liliaceae Fritillaria hajastanica (Gabrieljan) Gabrieljan—Takhtajania 3: 5. 2016

· Liliaceae Fritillaria pinardii Boiss. subsp. hajastanica Gabrieljan—Fl. Armen. 10: 82 (2001). (IK)

· Liliaceae Tulipa confusa Gabrieljan—Novosti Sist. Vyssh. Rast. 1966, 38 (1966). (IK)

· Linaceae Linum barsegjanii Gabrieljan & Dittrich—Candollea 47(1): 71 (1992). (IK)

· Linaceae Linum seljukorum P.H.Davis subsp. barsegjanii (Gabrieljan & Dittrich) T.V.Egorova—Bot. Zhurn. (Moscow & Leningrad) 85(7): 172. 2000 (IK)

· Poaceae Catabrosella violacea (Boiss.) Gabrieljan—Fl. Armen. 11: 281. 2010

· Poaceae Gaudinopsis egorovae Gabrieljan—Bot. Zhurn. (Moscow & Leningrad) 90(12): 1887 (-1889; fig. 1). 2005 [20 Dec 2005]

· Poaceae Hyalopoa hracziana Gabrieljan & Tzvelev—Bot. Zhurn. (Moscow & Leningrad) 91(7): 1088 (1087-1091; figs. 1-2). 2006 [26 Jul 2006]

· Poaceae Paracolpodium tzvelevii Gabrieljan—Bot. Zhurn. (Moscow & Leningrad) 90(12): 1888 (1890-1891; fig. 2). 2005 [20 Dec 2005]

· Poaceae Poa greuteri Gabrieljan—Willdenowia 36(1): 437 (-440; figs. 1-2). 2006 [27 Feb 2006]

· Poaceae Trisetum geghamense Gabrieljan—Fl. Rastitel'nost' Rastitel'nye Resursy Armen. 16: 11(-12; fig.). 2007

· Rosaceae Pyrus gabrieljanae M.F.Fay & Christenh.—Global Fl. 4: 104. 2018 [9 Feb 2018] [published online]

· Rosaceae Pyrus hajastana (Gabrieljan) M.F.Fay & Christenh.—Global Fl. 4: 106. 2018 [9 Feb 2018] [published online]

· Rosaceae Pyrus himalaica (Gabrieljan) M.F.Fay & Christenh.—Global Fl. 4: 107. 2018 [9 Feb 2018] [published online]

· Rosaceae Pyrus takhtajanii (Gabrieljan) M.F.Fay & Christenh.—Global Fl. 4: 123. 2018 [9 Feb 2018] [published online]

· Rosaceae Sorbus hajastana Gabrieljan—Dokl. Akad. Nauk Armyanskoi S.S.R. 22(2): 87. 1956 (IK)

· Rosaceae Sorbus himalaica Gabrieljan—Bot. Zhurn. (Moscow & Leningrad) 56(5): 658. 1971 (IK)

· Rosaceae Sorbus takhtajanii Gabrieljan—Biol. Zhurn. Armenii xxii. No. 2, 39 (1969). (IK)

· Rosaceae Sorbus tamamschjanae Gabrieljan—Biol. Zhurn. Armenii xxii. No. 42 (1969). (IK)

· Rosaceae Sorbus torminalis (L.) Crantz var. orientalis (Schönb.-Tem.) Gabrieljan—Fl. Turkey 4: 156. 1972 (IK)

· Rosaceae Sorbus umbellata (Desf.) Fritsch var. orbiculata (Kárpáti) Gabrieljan—Fl. Turkey 4: 155. 1972 (IK)

· Rosaceae Sorbus umbellata (Desf.) Fritsch var. orbiculata Gabrieljan—Ryabiny (Sorbus L.) Zapadnoi Azii i Gimalaev 175. 1978 (IK)

· Rosaceae Sorbus umbellata (Desf.) Fritsch var. taurica (Zinserl.) Gabrieljan—Fl. Turkey 4: 154. 1972 (IK)

· Scrophulariaceae Pseudolysimachion spicatum Opiz subsp. transcaucasicum (Bordz.) Gabrieljan—Fl. Armen. 8: 259 (1987):. (IK)

· Scrophulariaceae Scrophularia takhtajanii Gabrieljan—Sist. Zvol. Vyssh. Rast. 82 (-85; fig.). 1980

· Scrophulariaceae Scrophularia zvartiana Gabrieljan—Biol. Zhurn. Armenii xx. 34 (1967). (IK)
