= Crossiura =

Scientific classification
- Kingdom: Animalia
- Phylum: Arthropoda
- Class: Insecta
- Order: Lepidoptera
- Family: Hesperiidae
- Genus: Crossiura

Genus of butterflies

Crossiura is a genus of skipper butterflies in the family Hesperiidae. They are found in India.

== Species ==
- Crossiura pennicillatum (de Nicéville, 1892)
