= Vilve Jaaska =

Estonian botanist

Vilve Jaaska (fl. 1990) is an Estonian botanist.

She has recombined the following taxon:

- Vigna sect. Catiang (DC.) V.Jaaska & Jaaska, 1988

== See also ==
- List of botanists
