= Alexandra Smirnova =

Russian lady-in-waiting

Alexandra Osipovna Smirnova
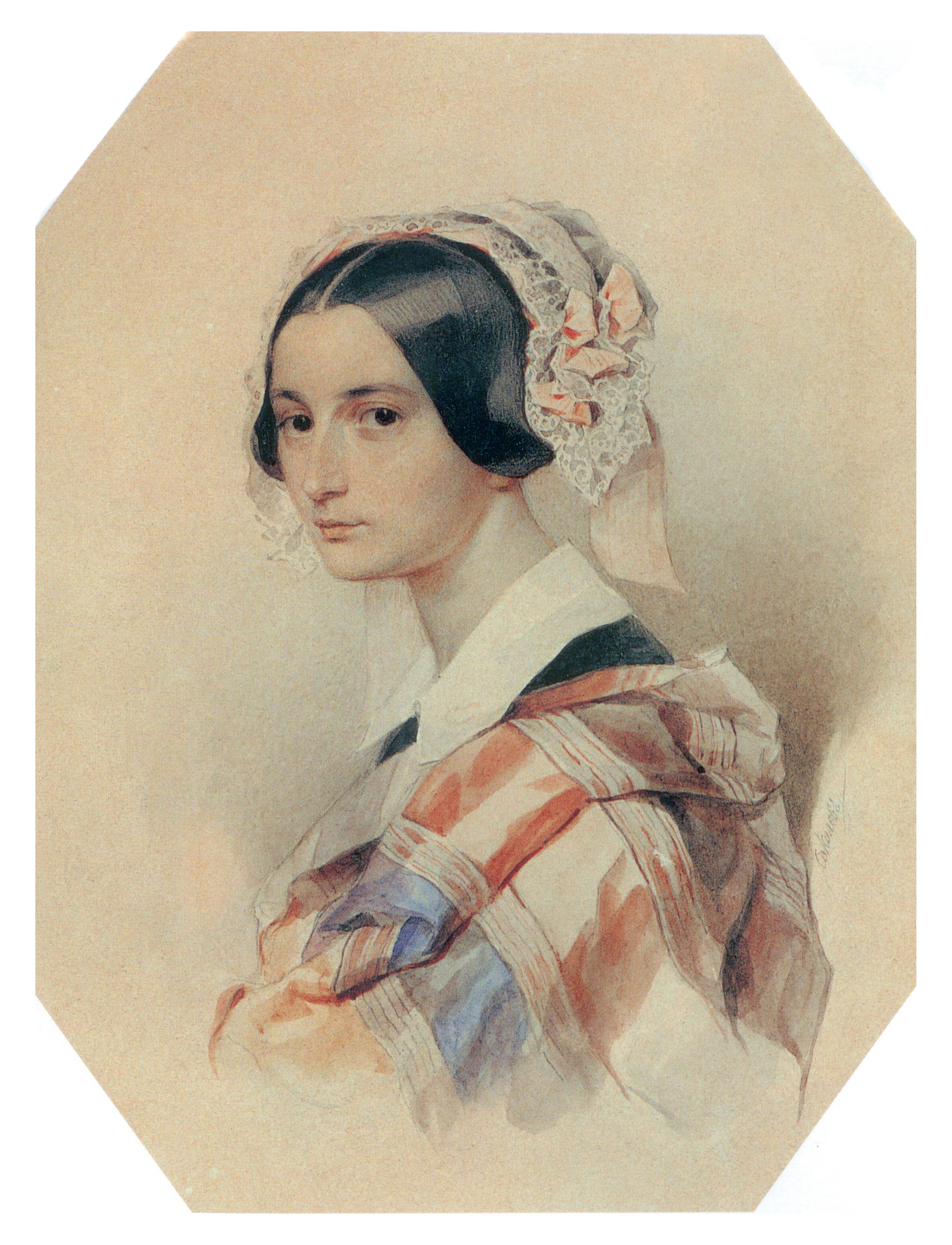
- Portrait by Pyotr Sokolov, 1835
- Born: Александра Осиповна Россет; 6 March 1809; Odessa, Russian Empire
- Died: 7 June 1882 (aged 73); Paris, France
- Occupations: Russian lady-in-waiting memoirist
- Spouse: Nikolai Smirnov
- Children: Alexandra Nikolaevna; Olga Nikolaevna; Sofia Nikolaevna; Nadezhda Nikolaevna; Mikhail Nikolaevich Smirnov
- Parents: Osip Ivanovich Rosset (father); Nadezhda Ivanovna Lorer (mother)

Alexandra Osipovna Smirnova (Russian: Александра Осиповна Смирнова, née Rosset, known also as Smirnova-Rosset, Russian: Смирнова-Россет; (6 March 1809, in Odessa, Russian Empire – 7 June 1882, in Paris, France) was a Russian Imperial court lady-in-waiting who served first widow Empress Maria Feodorovna, then, after her death in 1828, Empress Alexandra Fyodorovna. Alexandra Rosset (who in 1832 married Russian diplomat Nikolai Smirnov), was an elitist Saint Petersburg salon hostess and a friend of Alexander Pushkin, Vasily Zhukovsky, Pyotr Vyazemsky, Nikolai Gogol and Mikhail Lermontov. She is best remembered for her memoirs, unusually frank, occasionally caustic, and, as it was argued decades later, not necessarily accurate.

== Early life ==
She was the eldest daughter in a large Odessa family (Alexandra had four more brothers). Her parents were Osip Ivanovich, an officer of the Russian army, friend and distant relative of Duke Richelieu, and Nadezhda Ivanovna Rosset (née Lorer). Her mother was a niece of the Decembrist N.I. Lorer. Her brothers, Alexander and Klimenty Rosseti - also belonged to Pushkin's entourage, and brother Arkady was the civil governor of Vilnius and Minsk.

Osip Ivanovich Rosset came from an old French family, was the commandant of the port of Odessa, and died during a plague epidemic in the city in 1814. Alexandra's mother soon remarried Ivan Arnoldi (1780–1850). The children were given to their grandmother Ekaterina Evseevna Lorer (née Tsitsianova ) in the estate of Gromakley near the city of Nikolaev for the remainder of their upbringing. Later, the children studied in Saint Petersburg: where Alexandra attended the Catherine Institute.

When she graduated from the Catherine Institute, both her mother and grandmother had died. In 1826 she became Lady-in-waiting to the Dowager Empress Maria Feodorovna, after her death in 1828, the Empress Alexandra Feodorovna. She was described as attractive, intelligent, with a “sharp tongue,” one of the Empress's favorites, “on a short leg” with Nikolai Pavlovich and his brother Mikhail, Rosset nevertheless did not limit her interests to court life. She was friends with Nikolay Karamzin's daughter Sofia Nikolaevna and visited the salon of her stepmother E.A. Karamzina which was the center of St. Petersburg cultural life in the 1820s-40s.

In their house, Alexandra Osipovna met Alexander Koshelev, who passionately fell in love with her and wanted to marry her. though due to their different views on the future, this marriage did not take place. The circle of admirers and friends of Alexandra Osipovna was made up of famous writers and poets: Pushkin, Vladimir Odoyevsky, Pyotr Vyazemsky, Zhukovsky and many others.

"We were all, more or less, beautiful prisoners of war; who are more or less wounded, but everyone was touched and touched. Some of us called the dark-skinned, southern, black-eyed girl Donna Sol - the main character of the Spanish drama Hugo . Zhukovsky, who often likes to clothe poetic thought with a comic and aptly vulgar expression, nicknamed it "the heavenly devil." Who praised her black eyes, sometimes smiling, sometimes gunshot; who is a slender and small ear, this aristocratic feminine sign, like a handle and like a leg; who admired her beautiful and peculiar cuteness. Someone was ready, looking at her, to recall Vostokov 's old, completely non-sounding verses and exclaim: "Oh, what harmony Is this rare ensemble poured into!" - Vyazemsky

She was well read and knew the Russian language well (the teacher of Russian literature at the Catherine Institute was Pyotr Pletnyov) and at the same time, a young beauty, witty and easy to communicate, she attracted talented and famous people. Her financial situation in those years was difficult: the Rossets did not have an income, since their mother bequeathed her father's estate to her children from her second marriage.

== Marriage and children ==
On 11 January 1832 Alexandra married Nikolai Mikhailovich Smirnov (1807–1870), an official of the Ministry of Foreign Affairs, and owner of the Spasskoye estate near Moscow. The wedding took place in St. Petersburg in the Court Cathedral in the Winter Palace. It was a marriage of convenience, Smirnova said that she loved her husband no more than she would a friend.

In 1833-1837 she went abroad several times for treatment, lived in Berlin, Karlovy Vary, Mariánské Lázně. By this time, her acquaintance with Nikolai Kiselev turned into a mutual passion.

Alexandra and Nikolai Smirnov had the following children:

- boy stillborn (Oct. 1832), twin.
- Alexandra Nikolaevna (18 June 1834 - 17 March 1837), twin, died of a cough in Paris, was buried in Père Lachaise Cemetery.
- Olga Nikolaevna (18 June 1834 - 1893), Lady-in-waiting and goddaughter of Empress Alexandra Feodorovna.

Regarding the first two births of Smirnova, Pushkin wrote to his wife: “Smirnova gave birth safely, and imagine: two. What is the wench, and what is the red-eyed rabbit Smirnov? - The first child was made so that he could not get through, and now they are forced to split in two. Today seems like the ninth day - and you can hear that the mother and children are healthy. "

- Sofia Nikolaevna (12 August 1836, Stuttgart- 25 September 1884), wife of Prince Andrei Vasilyevich Trubetskoy (1822–1881).
- Nadezhda Nikolaevna (1840–1899), married (from 21 July 1865, London) to William Sorren.
- Mikhail Nikolaevich (1847–1892), graduated from Odessa University, biologist; member of the Paris Anthropological Society and the Vienna Society of Zoologists and Botanists. He was married to the daughter of the Tiflis merchant Tamamshev Elizaveta Mikhailovna.

== Later life ==
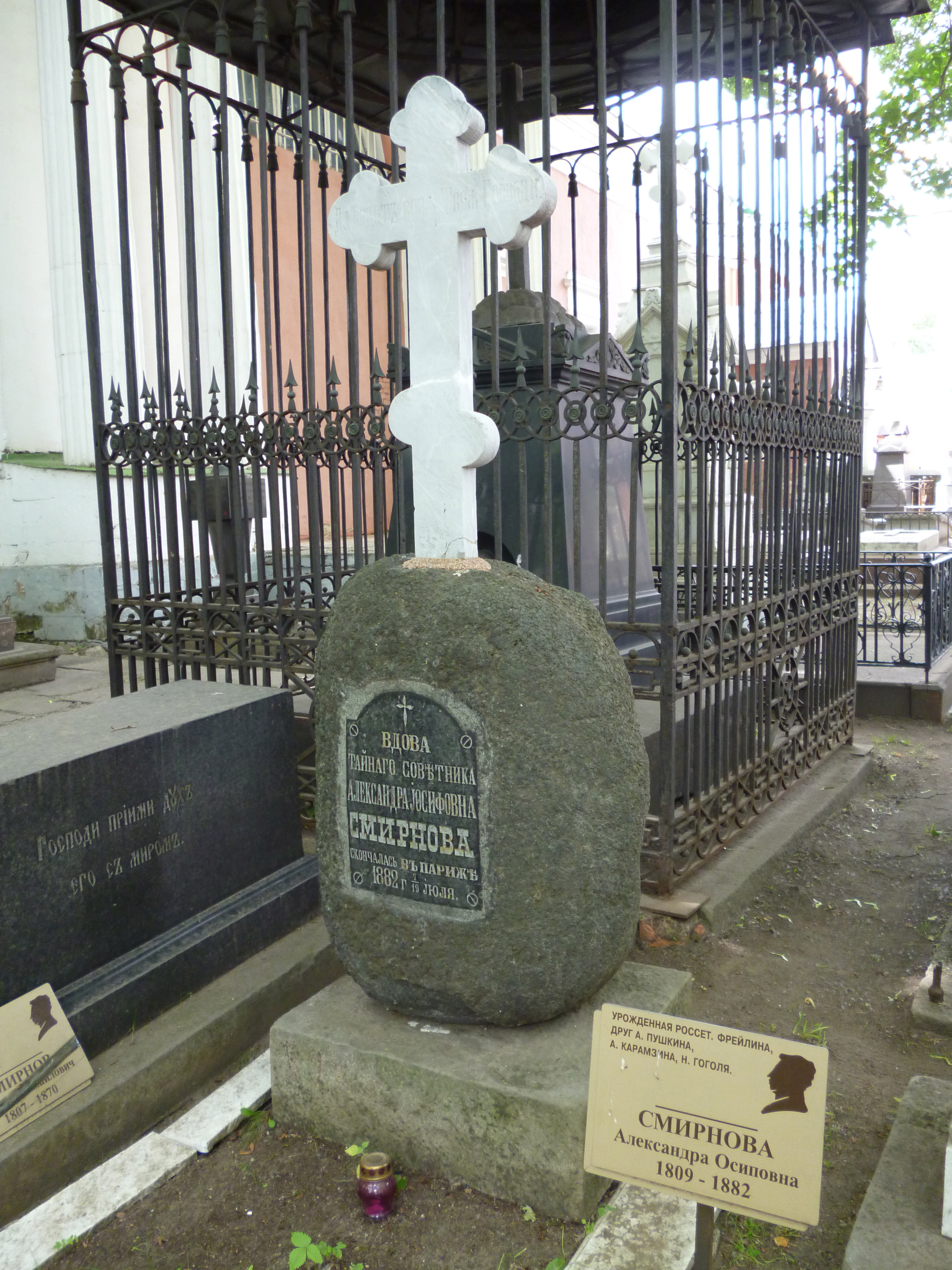
Alexandra Osipova's grave.

The news of the death of Pushkin found the Smirnovs in Paris, where her husband served in the Russian embassy. From a letter from Alexandra Smirnova to Vyazemsky:

"I was also insulted here, and deeply insulted, like you, by the injustice of society. Therefore, I am not talking about him. I am silent with those who do not understand me. The memory of him will remain in me unattainable and pure. I would have to tell you many things about Pushkin, about people and deeds; but in words, because I am afraid of written messages."

After the death of her daughter Alexandra in the spring of 1837, the elder Alexandra left Paris and moved to Florence, then to Düsseldorf and finally to Baden-Baden. Her husband's career went well, in 1843 Smirnov became the master of ceremonies of the court, and the family (by this time, the couple already had three children) returned to St. Petersburg.

In 1842–1844, Smirnova and her children went abroad again: in Rome, Nice, she spent time in the company of the artist Ivanov and Gogol.

In 1845, Smirnova-Rosset, together with her husband, moved to Kaluga, where he was appointed governor.

In 1847–49, she lived abroad and in St. Petersburg, then in the Spasskoye estate near Moscow, from 1855 she again lived in St. Petersburg, from the beginning of the 1860s she lived constantly abroad. In Paris, she participated in the secular and cultural life of the "capital of the world", visited the salons of Adam Mickiewicz, and Sophie Swetchine.

Alexandra Osipovna died of pneumonia in Paris; according to her will, she was buried in Moscow in the necropolis of the Donskoy Monastery.

Children
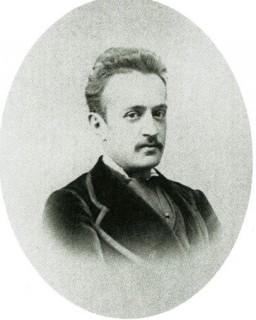
Mikhhail

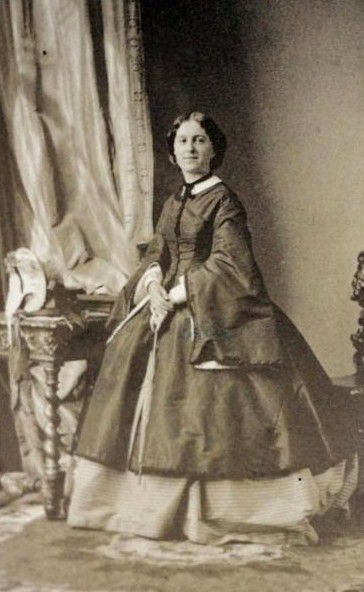
Olga

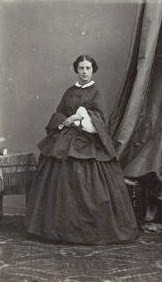
Sophia

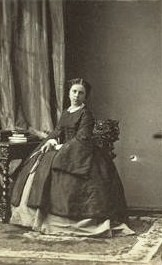
Nadezhda

== Memoirs and "Notes" ==
Along with the indisputable memoirs, diary entries from 1845 and correspondence (first published in the 1920s and gained great fame), under the name Smirnova-Rosset in the 1890s by her daughter Olga, "Notes" were also published, containing detailed several pages, monologues by Pushkin, Zhukovsky and others.

Suspicions of their authenticity arose even during their publication in 1893. The "Notes" were studied by Włodzimierz Spasowicz, and Vladmir Kallash, both of whom came to the conclusion that they were forged. Analysis of the text revealed significant anachronisms (for example, Pushkin discusses the novels by Dumas “The Three Musketeers ” and Stendhal's “ The Charterhouse of Parma”, written after his death) and the coincidence of some ideas with the diaries of the publisher of the notes - Rosset's daughter, Olga Nikolaevna Smirnova.

Apparently, this is partly a falsification on behalf of Olga Smirnova; if it is based on some oral stories of her mother, then it is hardly possible to identify them. Olga Nikolaevna herself, on the one hand, claimed that she had collected the scattered notes of her mother in different languages, translated and systematized them, on the other hand, that "she did not correct anything, did not change anything." Many researchers point out that the "Notes" bears the imprint of Olga Nikolaevna's personality and that the "Notes" differ sharply in style from the true memoirs of Alexandra Osipovna.

Opinions about the authenticity of the Notes were expressed by Dmitry Merezhkovsky, V. V. Sipovsky, A. O. Andreevich and V. A. Rozov.
