= Charles H. Wood =

British chemist

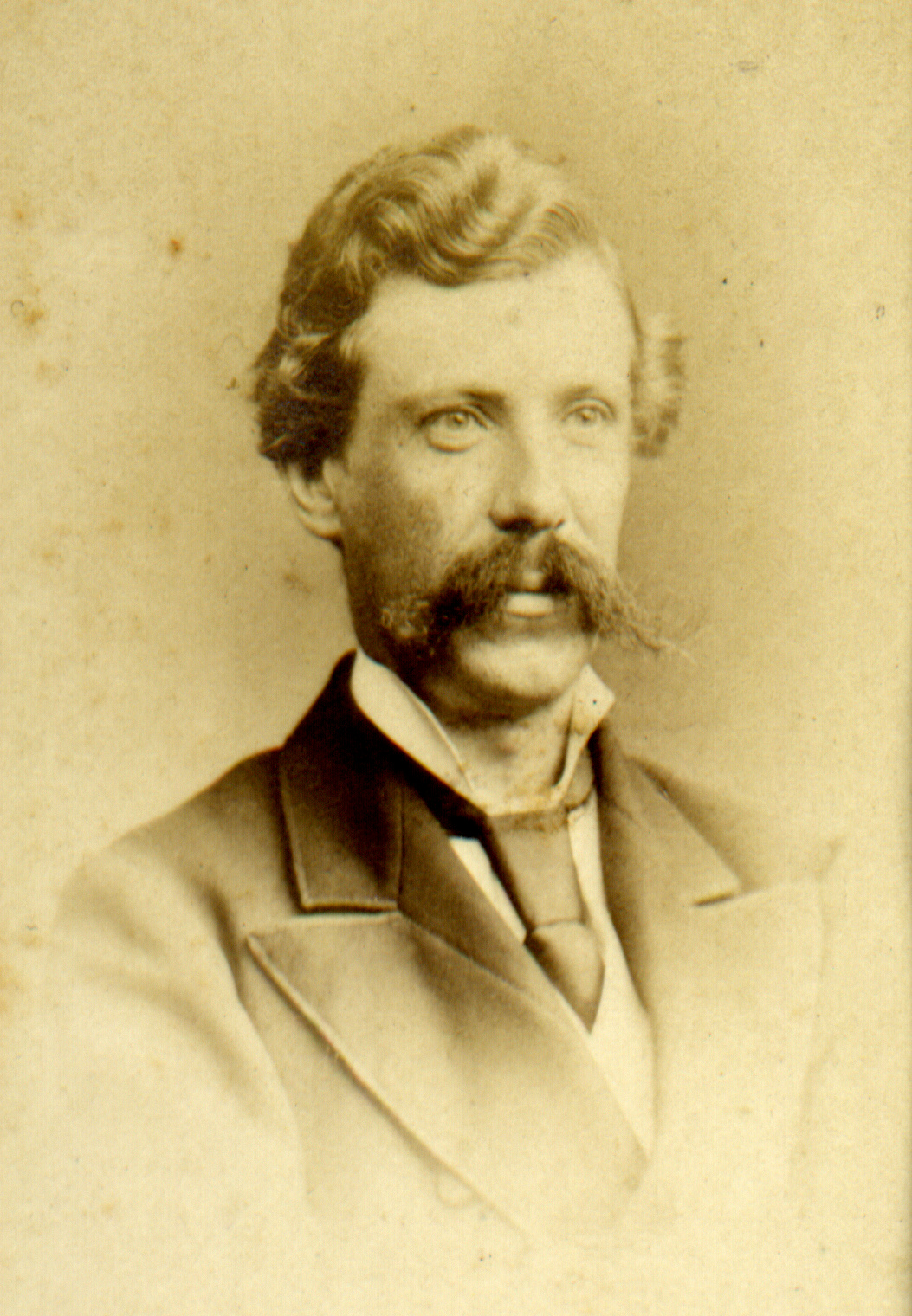
Charles H. Wood, 1878

Charles Henry Wood FCS (c. 1837 – 13 February 1917) was a British chemist. He was employed in the study of quinine extraction in British India, where he was a Professor of Chemistry at the Medical College, Calcutta.

Prior to 1864, he was a "demonstrator of chemistry" in the laboratory of the Royal Pharmaceutical Society. He was editor of The Chemist's Desk Companion with Charles Sharp in 1865. In 1887, he helped develop a solvent extraction process for the extraction of quinine from yellow bark at the Government Cinchona nurseries in Bengal. The process involved the use of fusel alcohol to extract the alkaloids, which were then precipitated as sulphates using sulphuric acid.

He was a government-employed quinologist at the nurseries in Bengal. He was selected for the position by the Secretary of State for India in May 1873 and arrived at the Rungbee Division (Mungpoo), India in October that year to take up his duties. Owing to delays in the arrival of his laboratory apparatus, he was unable to begin work before March 1874. "Some time was necessarily spent in the preliminary work of analysing the various barks produced in the plantation, with the view of determining the influence of elevation, manure, &c, on them, and also in conducting experiments with the object of settling on the most advantageous mode of manufacturing an efficient febrifuge. Actual manufacturing operations did not therefore begin until 1875." Wood was succeeded at the Rungbee cinchona plantations in India by James Alexander Gammie.

Wood was elected a Fellow of the Chemical Society (FCS) in 1878. In 1894 he married Rose Ada McMahon, 25 years his junior, and they had a son, Charles Edward Wood, born in 1897 in Egham. Charles Henry Wood died in Parkstone, Dorset on 13 February 1917.
