= Kelussia =

Scientific classification
- Kingdom: Plantae
- Clade: Tracheophytes
- Clade: Angiosperms
- Clade: Eudicots
- Clade: Asterids
- Order: Apiales
- Family: Apiaceae
- Genus: Kelussia; Mozaff.
- Species: K. odoratissima

Binomial name
- Kelussia odoratissima Mozaff.

Genus of flowering plants

Kelussia is a genus of flowering plants in the family Apiaceae. It includes a single species, Kelussia odoratissima, which is endemic to Iran. It is mainly located within the Ilam province and it is referred to in the local language of South Kurdish as wenegî /wænægi/. It is a sedative, and can induce a deep sleepiness when consumed.
