= Vello Jaaska =

Estonian botanist

Vello Jaaska (born 23 September 1936) is an Estonian botanist.

He has described the following taxon:

- Elymus nipponicus Jaaska, 1974

== See also ==
- List of botanists
