= Mikhail Nikolaevich Smirnov =

Russian botanist and ethnographer

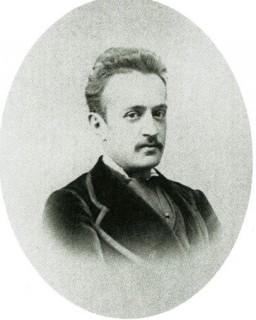
- Born: 20 May 1847; Kaluga, Russia
- Died: 1892 (aged 44–45); Odessa, Kherson province, Russian Empire
- Burial: Necropolis of the Donskoy Monastery
- Spouse: Elizaveta Mikhailovna Tamamsheva
- Father: Nikolai Mikhailovich Smirnov
- Mother: Alexandra Smirnova
- Occupation: Botanist, Ethnographer

Mikhail Nikolaevich Smirnov (Smirnov-Caucasian; May 30, 1847 in Kaluga – 1892, in Odessa) was a Russian botanist and ethnographer.

== Biography ==
Born into the family of Senator Nikolai Mikhailovich Smirnov (1807-1870) from his marriage to Lady-in-waiting Alexandra Osipovna Rosset (1809-1882). He graduated from the Imperial Novorossiysk University (Faculty of Natural Sciences), having defended his thesis in 1867 for the degree of candidate. He worked in Tbilisi in a special department of the governor Vorontsov.

He repeatedly visited the Caucasus with expeditions; he was one of the best researchers and experts on the Caucasian fauna and flora. From the 1870s he published articles in the field of zoology, botany, archeology and linguistics. It is considered the initiator of the geobotanical zoning of the Caucasus. Participated in the creation of the botanical garden library. His herbariums have been preserved in the National Museum of Tbilisi.

Member of the Society of Anthropology of Paris (1877), the Vienna Society of Zoologists and Botanists (1881) . He was also a member of the Medical Society, the Society of Caucasian Archaeologists, the Caucasian Branch of the Russian Imperial Society of Geography, the Society of the History and Archeology of the Caucasus and Agriculture; headed the office of the Organization for the Restoration of Orthodoxy in the Caucasus.

He died in Odessa at the age of 45 after a long illness.

== Family ==
Mikhail married Elizaveta Mikhailovna Tamamsheva (1854-1919), daughter of the Tiflis merchant Mikhail Yegorovich Tamamshev. As a dowry, the bride's parents donated a mansion on Ganovskaya Street (now - No. 20 Galaktion Tabidze Street), built in 1859 by Elizaveta's grandfather, Yegor Ivanovich Tamamshev, and designed by Otto Simonson. Mikhail transported furnishings from his mother's apartment in Saint Petersburg, and after her death, he imported nearly all of her personal belongings. This house was visited by Anton Rubinstein, Pyotr Ilyich Tchaikovsky, Niko Nikoladze, Petre Melikishvili and other representatives of the Russian and Georgian intelligentsia; here Ilia Chavchavadze celebrated the 100th anniversary of the birth of Alexander Pushkin.

Mikhail and Ekaterina had the following descendants:

- George (December 1876 – 1964); married Evgeniya Vladimirovna von Schleier;
  - Mikhail (4.5.1918, Tiflis - 20.1.1985, Tbilisi)

The house's furnishings and a library that belonged to A.O. Smirnova, as well as the archives and belongings of M.N. Smirnov, were bequeathed to the Georgian Soviet Socialist Republic, represented by the Chief Editorial Board for Literary Translation and Literary Relations at the Writers' Union of Georgia.
