= Elizabeth Seymour Rawlinson =

American horticulturalist and botanist (1901–1942)

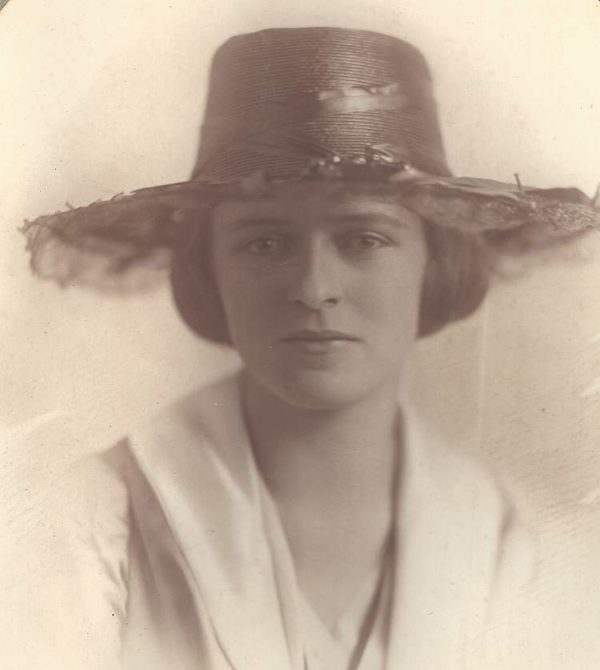
Elizabeth Seymour Rawlinson

Elizabeth Seymour Rawlinson (March 29, 1901 – July 19, 1942) was an American botanist, horticulturalist, gardener, writer, and naturalist. In the 1920s and 1930s, she was a pioneering conservationist who collected, and documented some of Virginia's rare plants and shrubs. She is considered an early Shenandoah Valley environmentalist for her extensive works in collecting and preserving plants from this area during the 1930s. From 1936 until her death in 1942, she served as editor of Garden Gossip, a newsletter published by the Garden club of Virginia and the Virginia Federation of Garden Clubs.

== Biography ==
Born on March 29, 1901, Elizabeth Seymour Rawlinson was the only child of Lionel Seymour Rawlinson and his wife Anne Elizabeth Cochran (1859–1931). Her father, the son of George Rawlinson (1812–1902), an eminent historian, and his wife Louisa Chermside, was a nephew of Sir Henry Rawlinson (1810–1895), an eminent Egyptologist, and a first cousin of General Henry Rawlinson (1864–1925), the commander of the Fourth Army of the British Expeditionary Force at the Battle of the Somme in 1916.

Elizabeth Rawlinson's father, a British aristocrat, came to America at the age of 22 to visit his uncle, Walter Chermside. She lived with her parents at Herringstone, near Staunton, Virginia. She completed her schooling from Stuart Hall School and St. Hilda's Hall, Charles Town, West Virginia. She was inspired by her mother who was a member of the Augusta garden club. During her childhood, she showed interest in collecting rare shrubs, wildflowers, crocuses and other bulbs.

She was a self-taught horticulturalist who explored many of the natural areas in Virginia and other places to collect plants. Some of these areas include Shenandoah National Park, Magnolia Springs, Stingy Hollow, Franklin Hollow, Briary Branch, Spring Pond, and Cold Springs bog. During her trips to southeastern Augusta, she was accompanied by Ruskin Freer, the editor of Claytonia.

Her writings on botanical topics were given top billing as a regular columnist in The New York Times. She also published articles in House & Garden and other horticultural journals including Claytonia, a Virginia botanical journal published by the Virginia Academy of Science.

Between 1928 and 1936, she served as the director of the new plant material at the garden club of Virginia. She was associated with numerous garden clubs and its events. In 1935, she won five first-place awards for her flowers and flower arrangements during the Augusta garden club spring flower show.

A reference library, established by the Augusta garden club at the Staunton public library in 1946, was named after her.

Her herbarium collections have been archived at the Virginia Tech arboretum.

She died on July 19, 1942, of cancer.
