= Eleonora Gabrielian =

Botanist

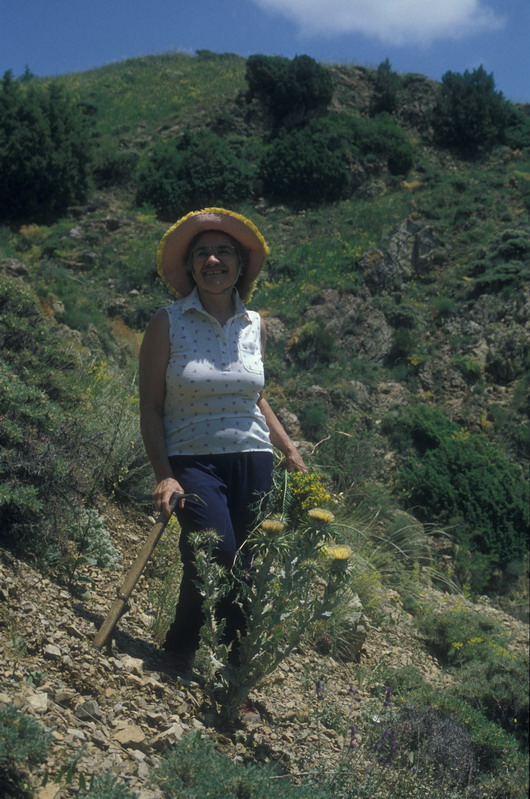
- Professor Eleonora Gabrielian in Armenia, northern Sevan, 1995
- Born: 22 February 1929 (age 97)
- Spouse: Vladislav Agababian (1932-1994)
- Children: Mariam (1964) Nune (1970)
- Parent: Tzolak Gabrielian Zvart Cholakian

Academic background
- Education: Yerevan State University (1946-1948) Moscow State University (1948-1951) Komarov Botanical Institute (Ph.D) (1952-1955)

Academic work
- Discipline: Botanist
- Main interests: Plant families Asteraceae, Iridaceae, Liliaceae, Rosaceae, Poaceae, Scrophulariaceae, Santalaceae, Malvaceae.

Eleonora (Nora) Tsolakovna Gabrielian (Gabrielyan) (Armenian: Էլեոնորա Ցոլակի Գաբրիելյան; Russian: Элеонора Цолаковна Габриэлян) (born 22 February 1929) is a Soviet, Armenian born botanist, doctor of biological sciences, professor.

Professor Eleonora Gabrielian is the president of the Armenian Botanical Society. She is a specialist in the fields of taxonomy, geography, evolutionary morphology and anatomy of plants. She has been awarded numerous awards and prizes during her career.

== Biography ==

=== Early life ===
Eleonora Gabrielian was born in Yerevan on 22 February 1929 to Tzolak Gabrielian and Zvart Cholakian. Her mother was an English teacher, her father was an electrical engineer who was repressed in 1937, rehabilitated posthumously in 1956. In 1946, Gabrielian completed secondary school and entered the Biology and Soil Faculty of the Yerevan State University, where at that time A. L. Takhtajan was teaching. After 2 years, she transferred to the Biology and Soil Faculty of Moscow State University, where she graduated with honors in 1951. In 1952-1955, she completed her doctorate in Leningrad (now St. Petersburg) at the Komarov Botanical Institute of the Russian Academy of Sciences (Russian: Ботанический институт им. В. Л.Комарова РАН), in the plant systematics and geography department. During her doctorate studies, she met her future husband Vladislav Agababian, also a botanist, future professor, who would become one of the founders of the Armenian school of palynology.

Under the guidance of A. L. Takhtajan, she successfully completed her Ph. D. thesis on "Caucasian representatives of the genus Sorbus L.".

=== Career ===
In 1955, Gabrielian returned to Armenia and entered the Institute of Botany of the Academy of Sciences of the Soviet Socialist Republic of Armenia as a junior researcher in the Department of Plant Systematics and Geography. In 1960, she became a senior researcher, in 1986 a leading researcher and in 1989 the head of the department of Plant Taxonomy and Geography in the Institute of Botany.

Since 1989 she has been in charge of the Department of Systematics and Geography of the Institute of Botany of the Republic of Armenia and heading a multivolume edition of the Flora of Armenia. Thanks to numerous expeditions in Armenia and other regions of the Caucasus, as well as by studying extensive materials in various herbaria worldwide, Gabrielian successfully completed in 1974 a doctoral thesis on the topic "The genus Sorbus L. of western Asia and the Himalayas".

In 1978, she published the fundamental monograph "Sorbus L. (Western Asia) and the Himalayas" "... which constitutes the gold fund of world literature on the systematics of flowering plants ..." (Bot. Journ. 1999. 84 (9): 133). In 1984 the book was awarded the Komarov Prize, the highest award of the Academy of Sciences of the USSR. Being one of the main authors of the multivolume edition of Flora of Armenia, and later heading the edition, she has always intensively continued the systematic research of numerous complex groups of plants, such as ferns, Scrophulariaceae, Compositae, Liliaceae and Poaceae families.

After the collapse of the Soviet Union, the last volumes (9, 10, 11) of the "Flora of Armenia" were published abroad, through the publishing house Koeltz Scientific Books.

During the times of the Iron Curtain, she worked with botanists from multiple Western countries. At the request of prof. P. H. Davis, Gabrielian prepared a revision of the genus Sorbus L. for the multivolume edition of "Flora of Turkey and the East Aegean Islands". Together with prof. W. Greuter, a modern catalog of Pteridophyta of the Armenian flora was compiled. Cooperation with Israeli colleagues prof. D. Zohary and O. Fragman-Sapir resulted in the publication of "Wild relatives of food crops native to Armenia and Nakhichevan" (2004) – the first detailed list of descriptions and maps of wild relatives of cultivated plants, and "Flowers of Transcaucasus and Adjacent Areas" (2008), the first scientific publication, illustrated by color photographs of plants and landscapes.

At the initiative of Gabrielian, a multi-year project began in order to create a compressed, easy-to-use, single-volume edition of the Flora of Armenia in three languages (Armenian, Russian, English) for the identification of plants. Long time collaboration with Carolyn Mugar and financial support of the Armenia Tree Project (ATP).

=== Protection of the nature in Armenia ===
Gabrielian is the author of the first "List of rare and endangered plants of Armenia" (1979), second edition of "Red Data Book" (1988) and author and scientific advisor of the last publication of "The Red Book of Armenia" (2010). Other works include: "Nature protection in Armenia" (1988), essays on all the protected territories of Armenia, in the book "Reserves of the Caucasus" (1990). In the 1980s, together with A. L. Takhtajan, she organized a series of speeches on television, radio and in the all-Union press to prevent the construction of a pumped storage power plant on the territory of the Khosrov Reserve. She took contributed to the set up of the Erebuni Reserve. She prevented the Artanish Reserve from being transferred to management under the military unit of the Ministry of Defense of Armenia, where it would have been used to construct a military facility. Since 2002, she has been a consultant in the two major organizations for nature protection: The Foundation for the Preservation of Wildlife and Cultural Assets (FPWC) and WWF participating in numerous projects on the study, conservation and sustainable use of natural resources of Armenia. In 2016, in collaboration with O. Fragman-Sapir and K. Manvelyan, the book "Green Armenia" was published with notes and illustrations of representatives of Armenian flora.

=== Personal life ===
During her student years, she traveled alone, with a herbarium bag on her shoulder, walking on foot throughout the Caucasus discovering the region with a very rich flora. Later on her travels took her throughout Great Britain, the Baltic states, the Carpathians, Central Asia, Iran and Kamchatka. She spent 5 months in the Indian Ocean on the research vessel "Acad. Vernadsky" in 1981. A year later, she participated in the expedition organized by A. Cronquist in the United States together with A. L. Takhtajan. In 1980, in Spain (Seville), she participated for the first time in the conference on the study of the Mediterranean flora OPTIMA. In 1989, she was elected a member of the Executive Council of the organization.

Gabrielian was friends with Armenian artists such as Martiros Saryan (a portrait of her from his brush is kept in the National Gallery of Armenia), Minas Avetisyan, and Haroutiun Galentz.

== Scientific discoveries/publications ==
=== Selected plants named by Gabrielian ===
- Amaryllidaceae Galanthus artjuschenkoae Gabrieljan in Fl. Rastitel'nost' Rast. Res. Arm. 12: 13. 1999.
- Asteraceae Amberboa gubanovii Gabrieljan in Takhtajania 1: 37. 2011.
- Asteraceae Amberboa takhtajanii Gabrieljan in Takhtajania 1: 36. 2011.
- Asteraceae Carthamus tamamschjanae Gabrieljan in Fl., Rast. i Rast. Res. Arm. SSR 10: 21. 1987.
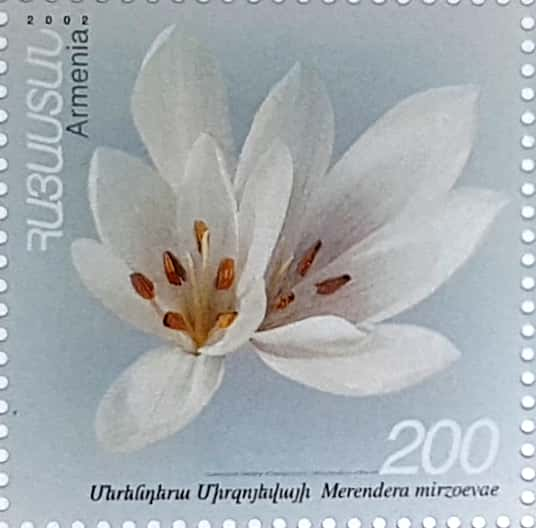
An Armenian post stamp showing the Merendera mirzoevae Gabrieljan.

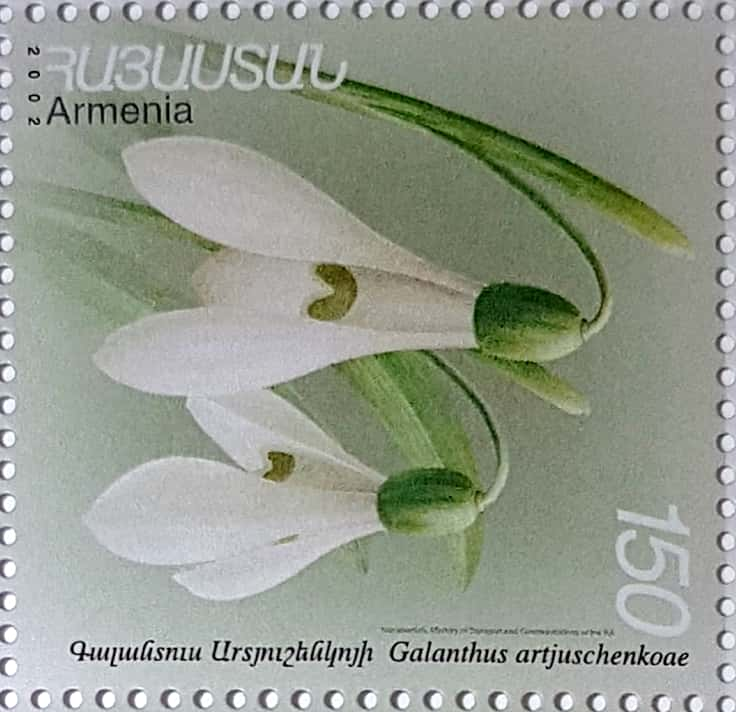
An Armenian post stamp showing the Galanthus artjuschenkoae Gabrieljan.

== Honours, decorations, awards and distinctions ==
=== Honours and awards ===
- Medal of the XII International Botanical Congress, Leningrad, 1975
- Certificate of Merit of the Armenian Academy of Sciences, 1978
- Higher (Komarov) prize of the Academy of Sciences of the USSR, 1984
- Gold Medal of Valiant Labour of the Supreme Soviet of the USSR, 1986
- Honorary vice-president and silver medal of XIV International Botanical Congress, Berlin, 1987
- George Soros's Foundation scholarship, Biodiversity, 1992
- Honorary Silver Plaque of Herbarium Mediterraneum Foundation, Palermo, 2001
- Honorary Diploma and Prize of Russian Party of Self-government of Working People, Moscow, 2003
- First recipient of the John T.O'Connor Environmental Activist Award, 2004
- Honorary Diploma and gold medal of the Ministry of Nature Protection of Armenia, 2011
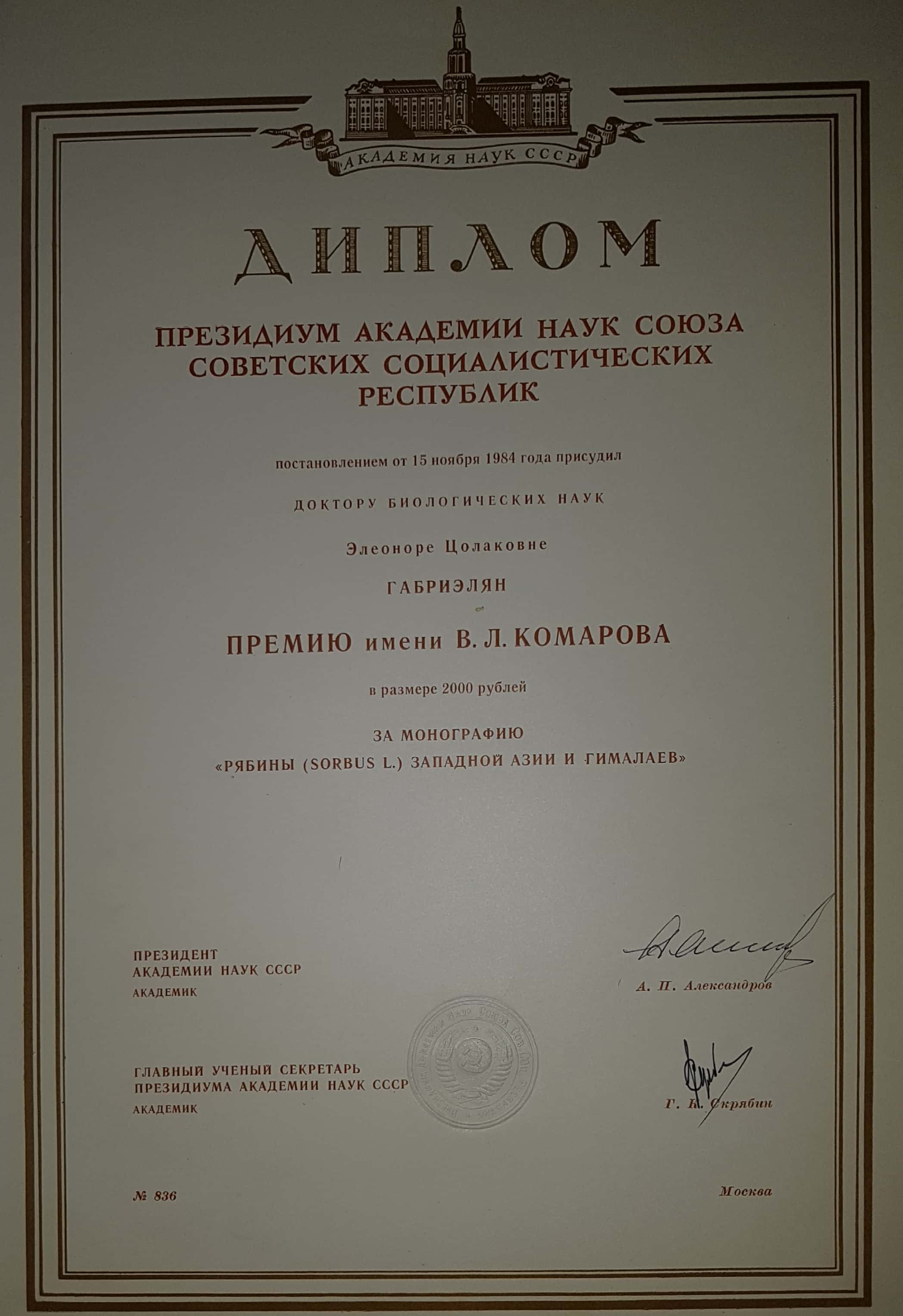
Komarov prize, 1984

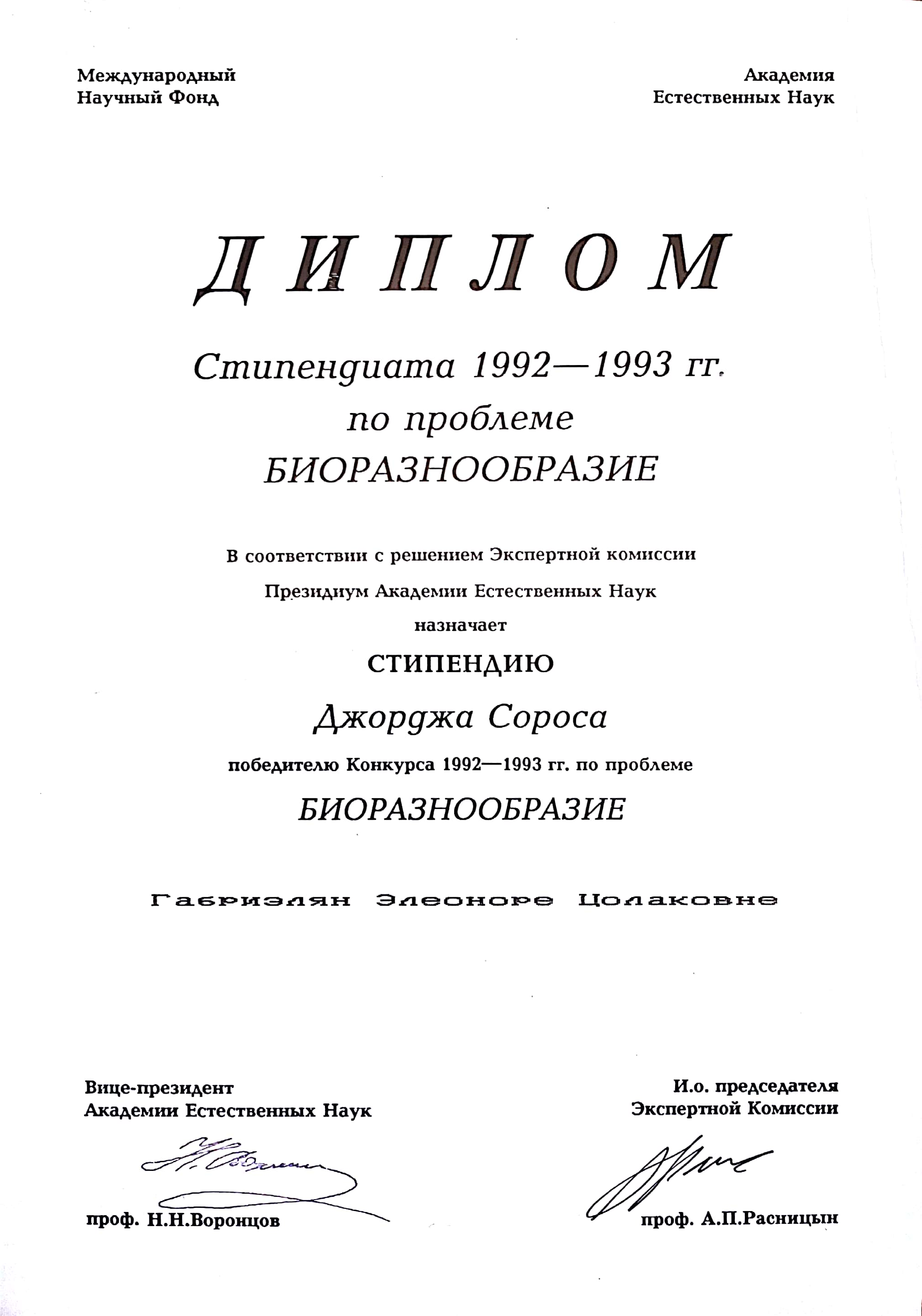
George Soross Foundation scholarship

=== Plant species named in honour of Gabrielian ===
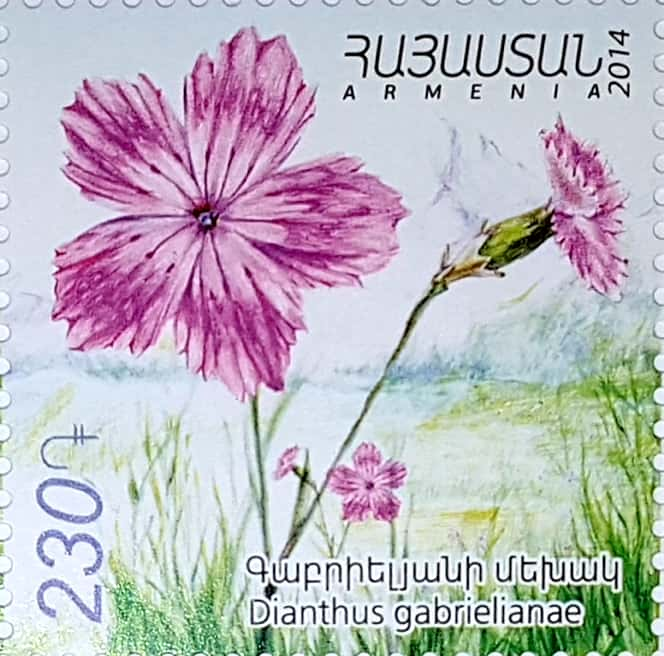
An Armenian post stamp showing the Dianthus gabrielianae.

- Fabaceae Astragalus gabrielianae
- Asteraceae Centaurea gabrieljanae
- Asteraceae Cousinia gabrieljaniae
- Brassicaceae Erysimum gabrielianiae
- Caryophyllaceae Dianthus gabrielianae
- Clusiaceae Hypericum eleonorae
- Hyacinthaceae Ornithogalum gabrielianiae
- Liliaceae Gagea eleonorae
- Papaveraceae Papaver gabrielianae
- Plumbaginaceae Acantholimon gabrieljaniae
- Poaceae Bromopsis gabrielianae
- Poaceae Puccinellia gabrieljanae
- Rosaceae Crataegus gabrielianae
- Rosaceae Pyrus gabrieljanae
- Rosaceae Sorbus eleonorae
- Rosaceae Sorbus gabrieljanae
- Scrophulariaceae Celsioverbascum gabrielianae

== See also ==
- Armen Takhtajan
- Martiros Saryan
- Haroutiun Galentz

== Bibliography ==
- Gabrielian, E. 1978. The Genus Sorbus in Eastern Asia and the Himalayas. Erevan. (in Russian).
- Gabrielian, E. & Vallès Xirau, J. 1996. New data about the genus Artemisia L. (Asteraceae) in Armenia. − Willdenowia 26: 245−250. ISSN 0511-9618.
- Gabrielian, E.: The genus Gladiolus (Iridaceae) in southern Transcaucasia. − Bocconea 13: 445-455. 2001. −ISSN 1120-4060.
- Gabrielian, E. & Zohary, D. 2004. Wild relatives of food crops native to Armenia and Nakhichevan.
- Gabrielian, E. & O. Fragman-Sapir. 2008. Flowers of the Transcaucasus, including Armenia, Eastern Turkey, southern Georgia, Azerbaijan and northern Iran. A.R.G. Gartner Verlag.
