= Thora Hardy =

Swiss chemist (1902-1993)

- Dr. Thora Plitt examining a fur pelt in 1938
- Born: 31 July 1902; Switzerland
- Died: 1 January 1993 (aged 90); State College
- Alma mater: University of Chicago; Barnard College
- Occupation: Botanist
- Employer: United States Department of Agriculture

Thora Margraff Plitt Hardy (31 July 1902 – 1 January 1993) was an American chemist born in Switzerland. She was educated at Barnard College, Columbia University, from where she graduated in 1925. Afterwards, she worked as a New York City high school teacher from 1925 to 1929. She returned to academia at the University of Chicago to start her PhD studies in 1932. Following completion of her PhD in 1935, she worked for a time as a botany instructor but saw little opportunity to progress.

Subsequently she worked with the US Government, first with the National Bureau of Standards and then at the Department of Agriculture (USDA) until she left in 1951. Her work focused on plant microchemistry and the physiology and microscopic analysis of commercial furs. She assisted with Second World War efforts when she was requested to apply her studies of fur fibres for the armed forces. She wrote several books, including Microscopic Methods Used in Identifying Commercial Fibres published in 1939.

A cash award is made available at the University of Missouri by an endowment established by Thora Hardy in memory of her husband, John I. Hardy. The award is bestowed on an undergraduate to recognize their academic achievements, the quality of their independent research projects, and their extracurricular contributions.
