= Albert Callay =

French botanist (1822–1896)

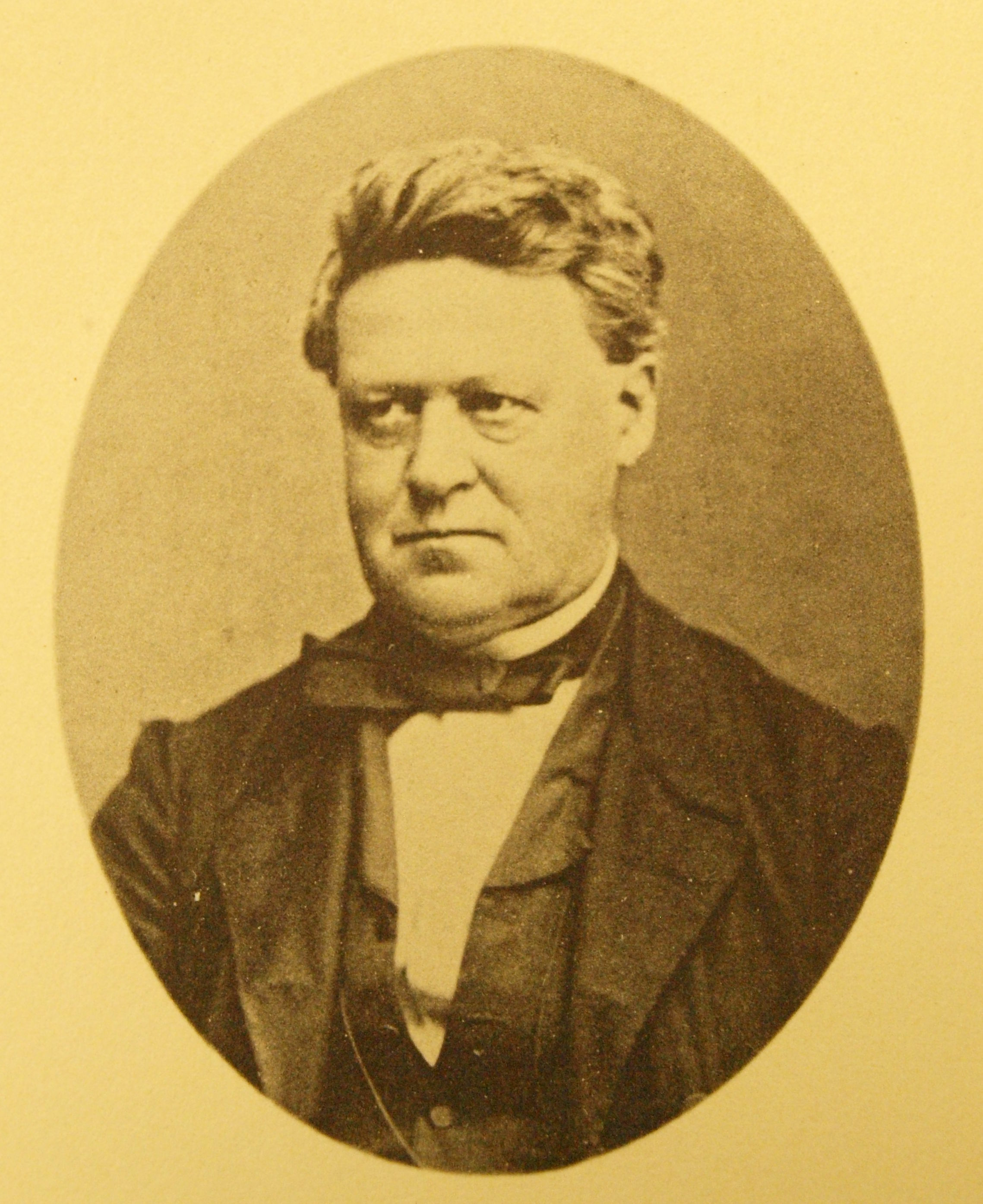
- Born: 21 February 1822; Montcornet, Aisne, France
- Died: 24 March 1896 (aged 74); Le Chesne, Ardennes
- Scientific career
- Fields: Naturalist
- Author abbrev. (botany): Callay

Eugène Albert Athanase Callay (born 21 February 1822 in Montcornet, Aisne; died 24 March 1896 in Le Chesne, Ardennes) was a French pharmacist and amateur botanist who worked on classifying the flora of the department of the Ardennes.
