= Artanish =

Village in Gegharkunik, Armenia

Artanish Արտանիշ
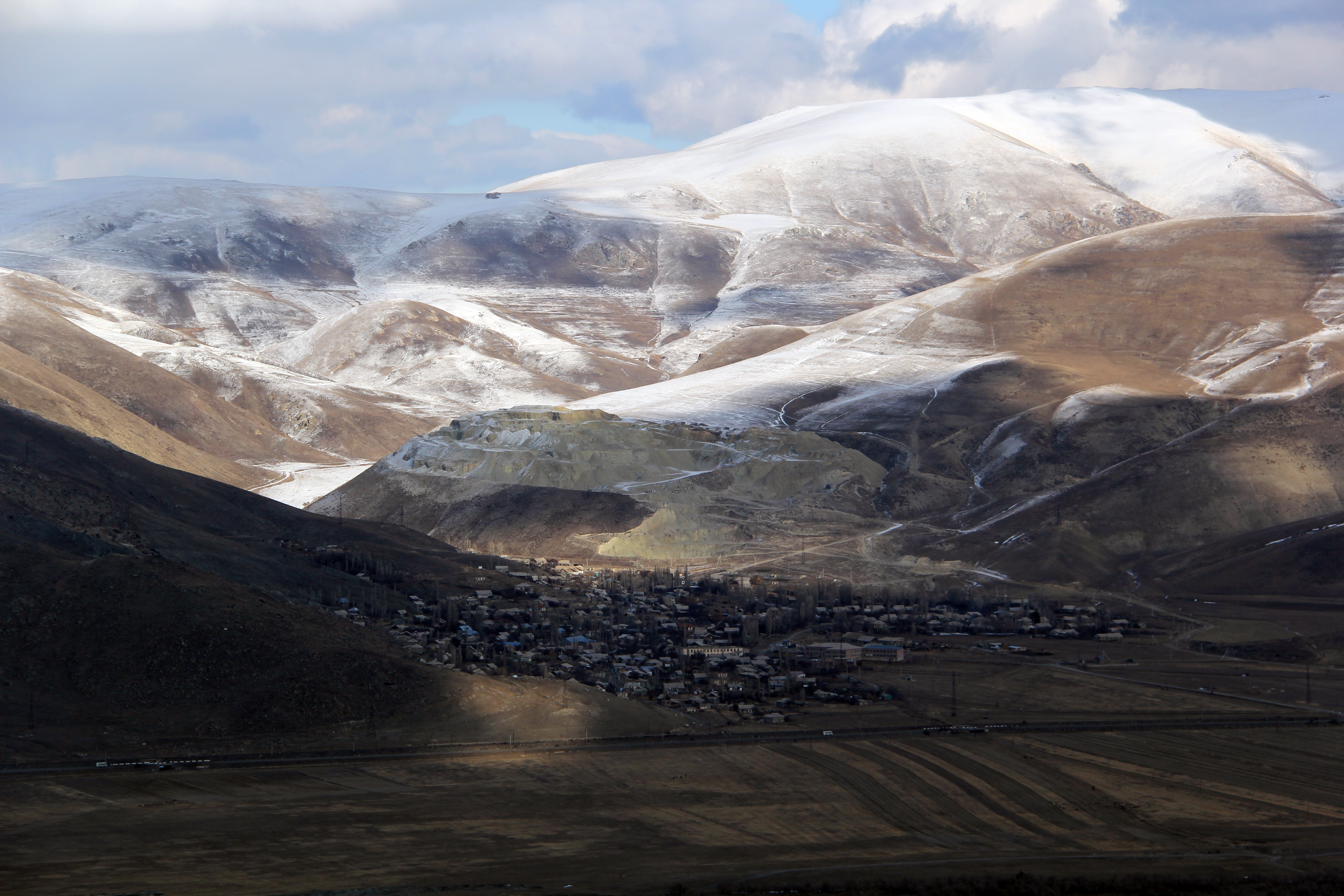
- A view of Artanish

- Location within Armenia Location within Gegharkunik
- Coordinates: 40°29′50″N 45°21′52″E
- Country: Armenia
- Province: Gegharkunik
- Municipality: Shoghakat
- Elevation: 1,924 m (6,312 ft)

Population (2011)
  - Total: 756
- Time zone: UTC+4 (AMT)
- Postal code: 1308

Artanish (Armenian: Արտանիշ) is a village in the Shoghakat Municipality of the Gegharkunik Province of Armenia. On a hill just to the west are the ruins of cyclopean fortresses, and nearby is a church and a cemetery.

== Nature ==
The vicinity of the village hosts 111 species of butterflies and is recognized as the Prime Butterfly Area "Artanish-Shorzha". The area is also known as one of the key birdwatching sites of Armenia.

== Gallery ==
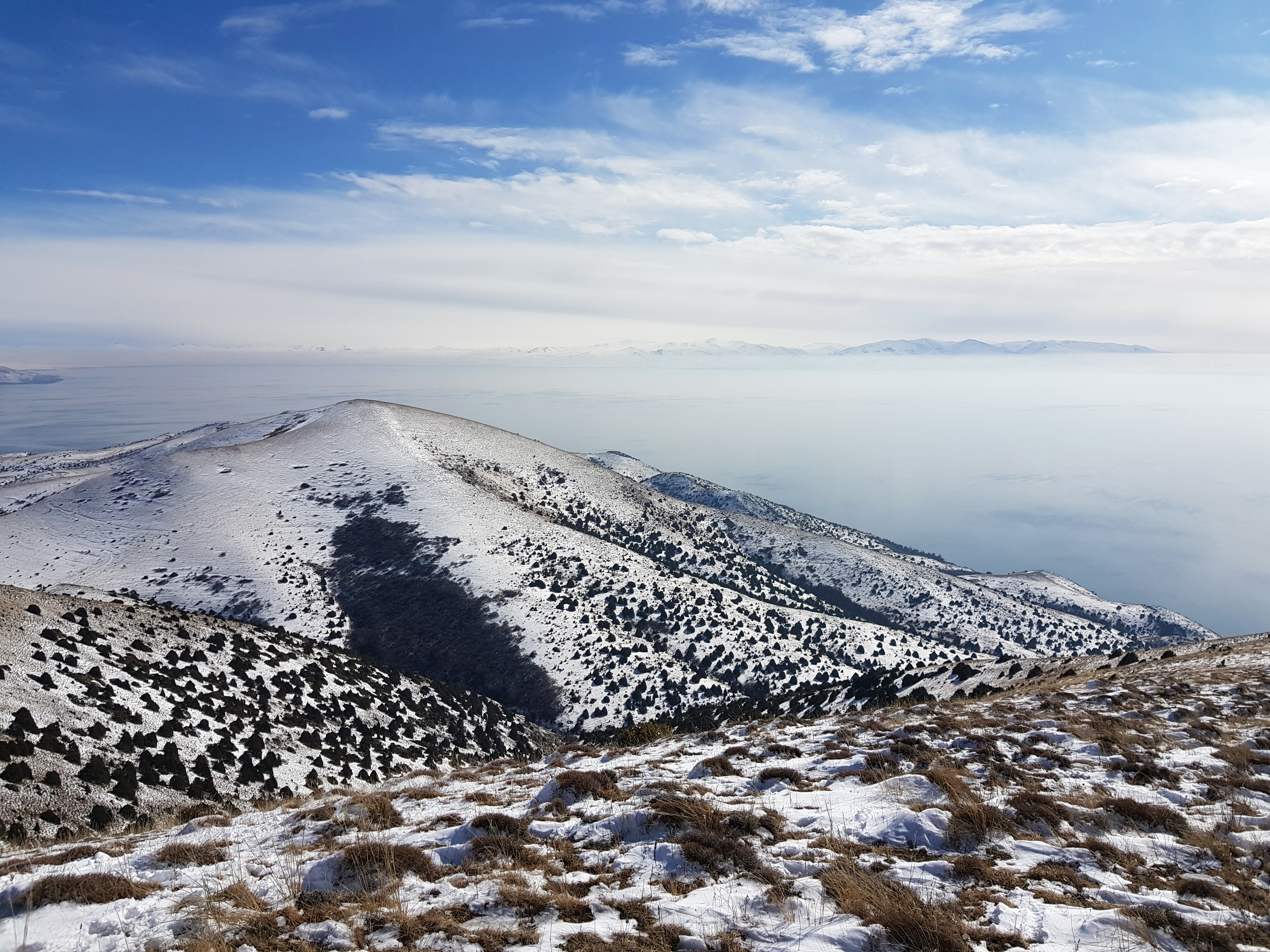
Lake Sevan from Mount Artanish

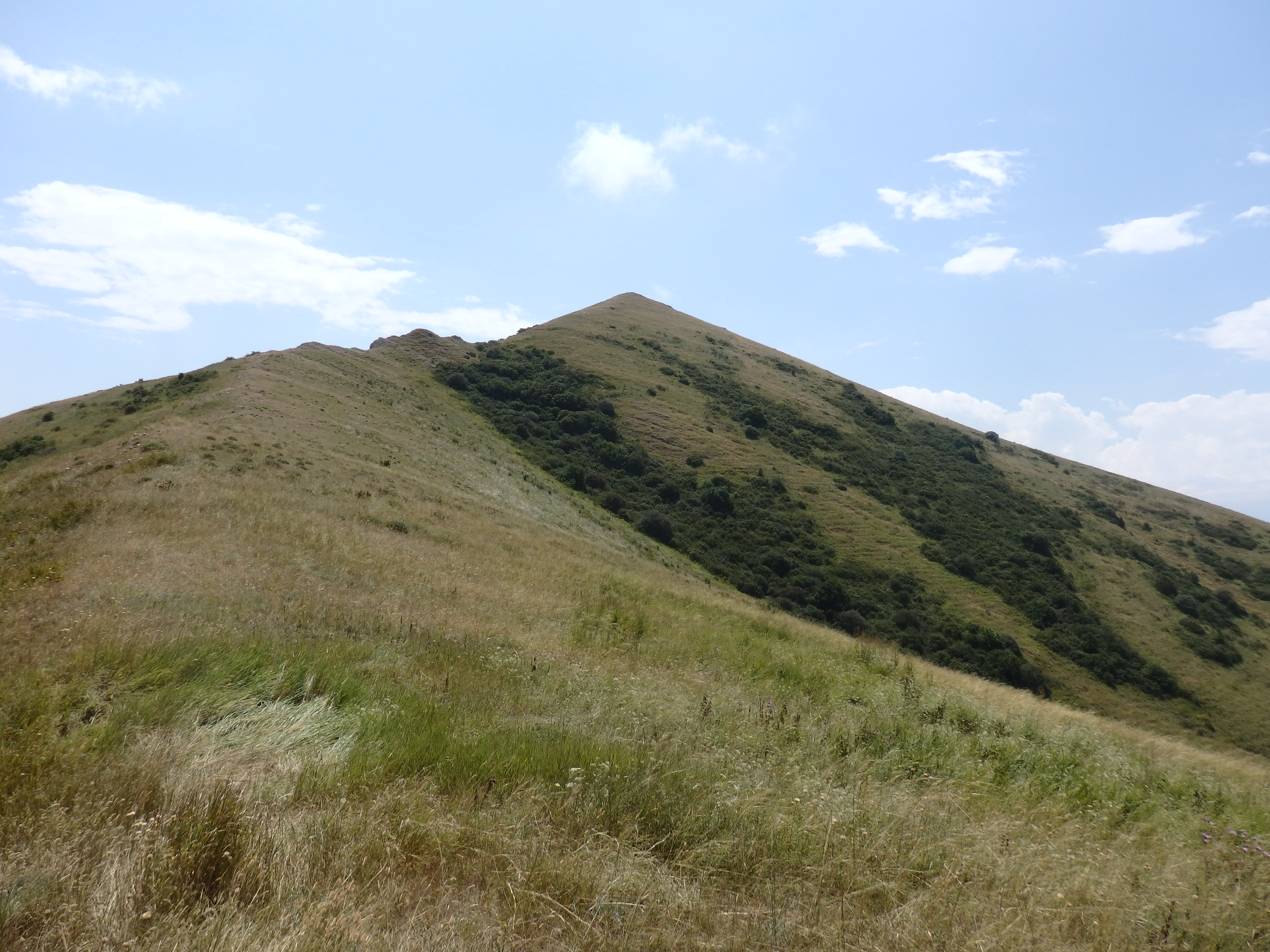
Scenery around Mount Artanish

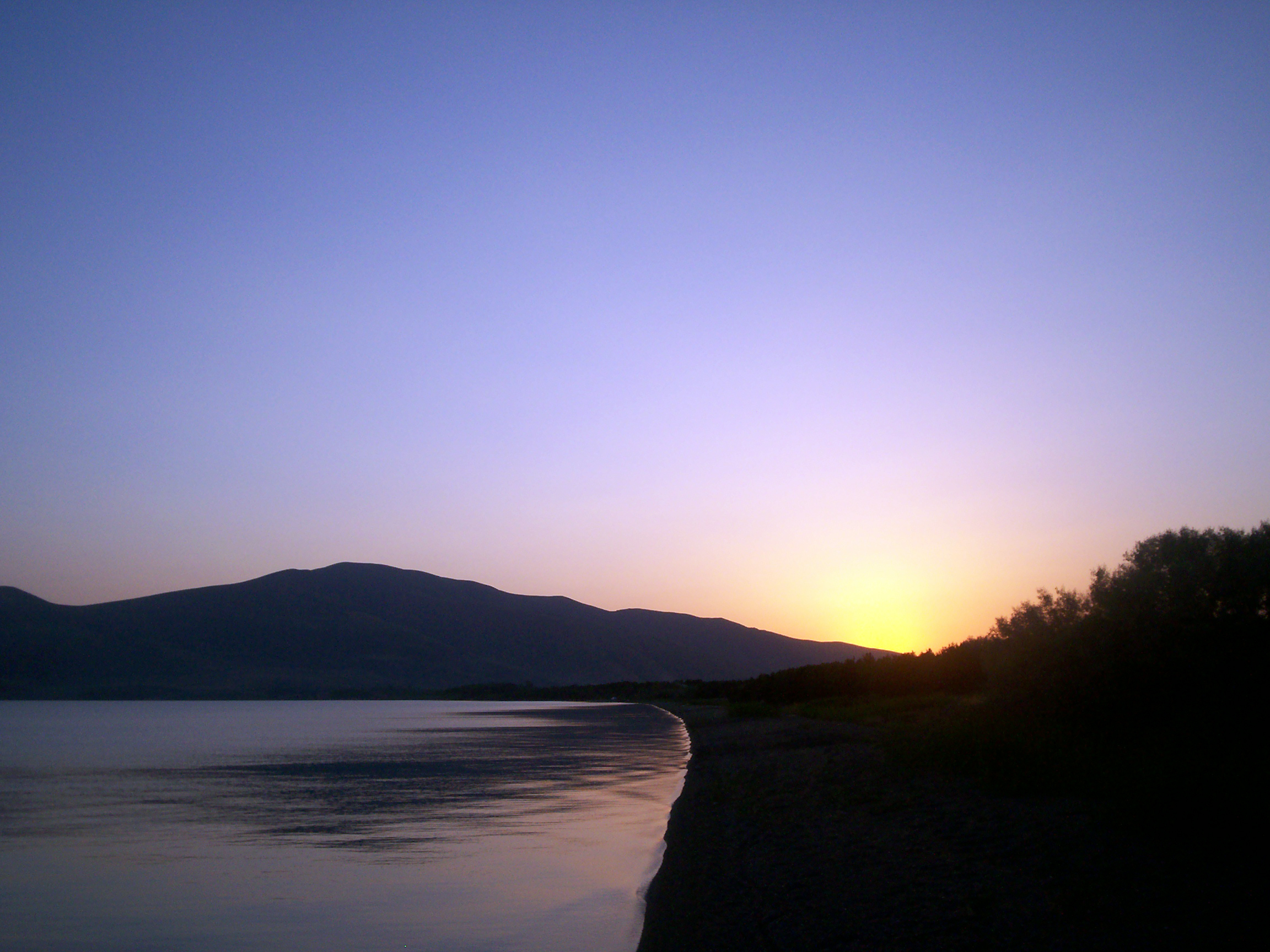
Scenery around Mount Artanish

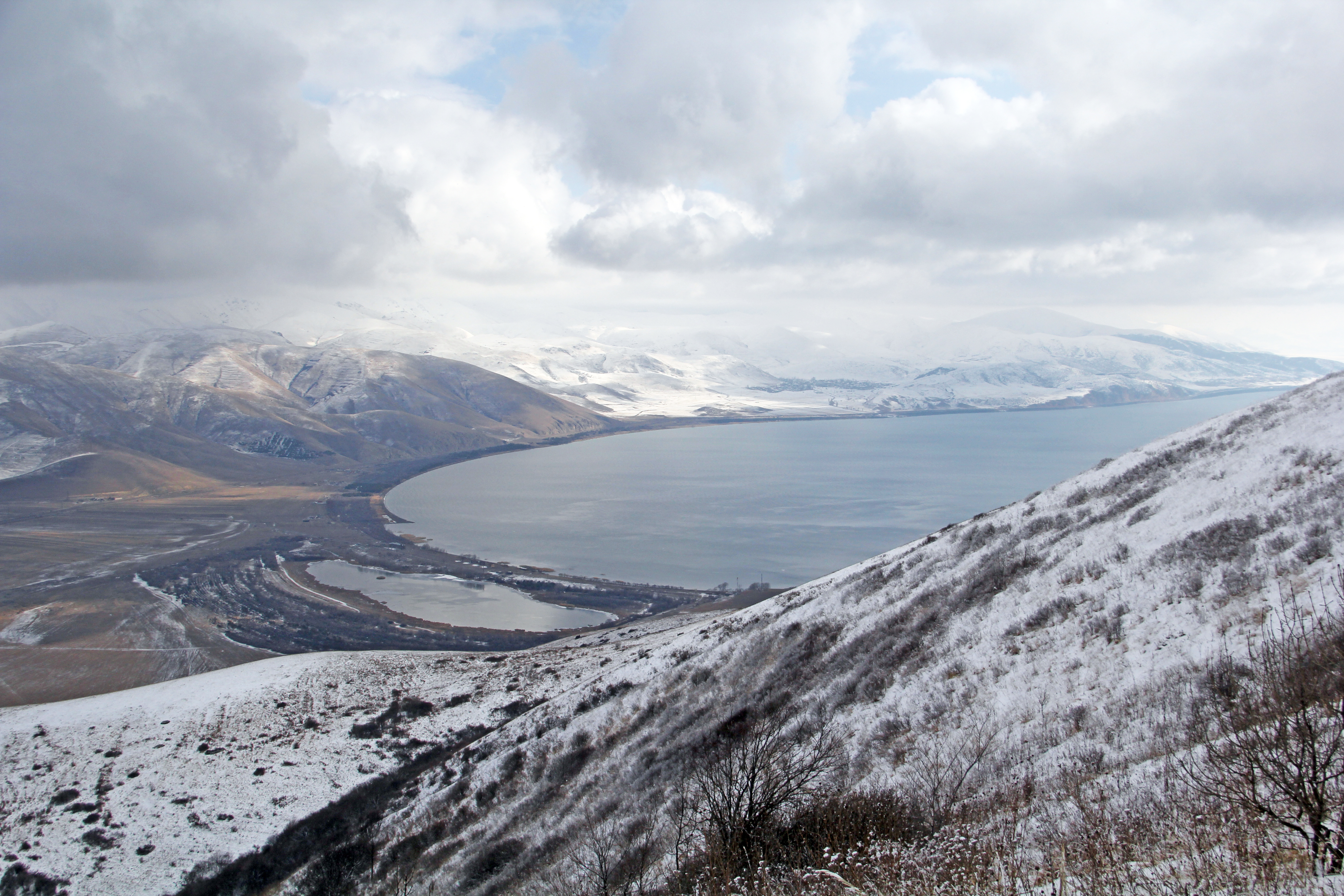
Scenery around Mount Artanish
