= Hedvig Lovén =

Swedish botanist (born 1867)

Hedvig Santesson
- Born: Hedvig Lovén; 13 December 1867; Stockholm, Sweden
- Died: October 26, 1943 (aged 75)

Hedvig Karolina Lovisa Santesson (née Lovén) was a Swedish botanist who made significant contributions to the field of plant respiration in the late 19th century.

== Early life ==
Born on December 13, 1867, in Stockholm, Sweden, she was the daughter of Otto Christian Lovén, a Swedish physician and politician, and Elisabeth Johanna Emilia (née von Julin), who hailed from Finland.

== Scientific work ==
Lovén pursued her education at a type of Scandinavian college known as Hogskola, where she developed a keen interest in botany.

Between 1888 and 1892, Hedvig Lovén published three academic papers on botany and conducted extensive research on plant respiration studies. Her papers explored various aspects of plant respiration, shedding light on the mechanisms by which plants and algae exchange gases and obtain energy through metabolic processes. Her work contributed to the understanding of plant physiology and the role of respiration in plant growth and development.

Specifically, Lovén's paper on evergreen plants belonging to the genus Dracaena and Yucca played a pivotal role in resolving a controversial debate between two prominent botanists, Gustav (Heinrich) Krabbe and Leopold Kny, in the late 1800s. Her work provided independent evidence regarding the nature of water-conducting elements in the secondary wood of Dracaena and other monocotyledons that share a similar mode of growth. Lovén's findings shed light on the mechanisms of cell fusion and growth in these plants, offering valuable insights into the field of plant biology.

== Personal life ==
In 1892, Hedvig Lovén married Carl Gustav Santesson, a professor of medicine and pharmacology at the Karolinska Institute. Together, they had four children: Carl Gustaf Christian Santesson, Maja Johanna Vilhelmina Santesson, Anna Lisa Augusta Santesson, and Lars Johan Henrik Santesson.

Hedvig Lovén died on October 26, 1943, at the age of 75.
