= Hans Lambers =

Botanist and research scientist

Hans Lambers FAA FRNAAS
- Born: Johannes Thieo Lambers; Anloo, Netherlands
- Citizenship: Australia, Netherlands
- Education: University of Groningen
- Known for: Morphological, physiological and physiognomic adaptations of plants and plant roots to poor soil fertility.
- Title: Emeritus Professor
- Scientific career
- Fields: Botany, Ecophysiology, Plant Physiology, Plant Nutrition, Conservation, Proteaceae
- Workplaces: Utrecht University, University of Western Australia, China Agricultural University, Beijing Forestry University
- Thesis: Energy metabolism in higher plants in different environments (1979)
- Author abbrev. (botany): H Lambers

Johannes Thieo (Hans) Lambers (born 1950) is a Dutch-Australian botanist and research scientist. He holds positions as Emeritus Professor at the University of Western Australia, Distinguished Professor at the China Agricultural University, Strategic Scientist at Beijing Forestry University and Editor-in-Chief of the Plant and Soil Journal. His research primarily focusses on plant ecophysiology and plant-soil interactions. Lambers has been listed on the list of Highly Cited Researchers in the fields of Plant and Animal Science and Agricultural Sciences since 2002. He was elected as a corresponding member of the Royal Netherlands Academy of Arts and Sciences in 2003 and of the Australian Academy of Science in 2012.

== Career ==
Hans Lambers completed his PhD at the University of Groningen in 1979. In 1985 he was appointed Professor of Ecophysiology at the Utrecht University in the Netherlands. In 1998 he moved to Perth, Australia where he was appointed as Professor of Plant Biology and Ecology at the University of Western Australia (UWA). Lambers led and published research into mineral-nutrition strategies of native Australian plants and crop and pasture species growing on the region's nutrient-poor soils. Lambers has been Editor-in-Chief of Plant and Soil, an international journal on plant-soil relationships since 1992.

== Research ==
Lambers has published, or co-published, 693 peer-reviewed articles which have been cited over 43,307 times and as a result is featured on the list of Highly Cited Researchers in fields of Plant and Animal Science and Agricultural Sciences. His research examines plant adaptations to nutrient-poor soils, with emphasis on physiological and ecological mechanisms that enable nutrient acquisition in phosphorus-deficient environments in south-western Australia and Brazil.

He has investigated the structure and function of cluster roots in Proteaceae and the role of organic-acid exudation in phosphorus mobilisation on impoverished soils. In 1992, Lambers and Hendrick Poorter co-authored research examining the variation in relative growth rates among plant species, examining physiological traits associated with differing ecological strategies in different environments. The study is now a highly cited foundational work which further linked plant physiology and ecology, spurring a growing field of research.

Lambers is co-author of the textbook Plant Physiological Ecology (Springer), first published in 1998 and republished in 2009 and 2019.

== Honours ==
Lambers has received national and international honours in recognition of his contributions to plant physiology and ecology. He has been elected to several learned academies and professional societies, delivered distinguished lectures, and received multiple lifetime and honorary awards for research and teaching. Lambers was elected a Fellow of the Hollandsche Maatschappij der Wetenschappen in 1997 and became a Member of the International Council on Plant Nutrition in 2001. He was elected a corresponding member of the Royal Netherlands Academy of Arts and Sciences in 2003 and a Fellow of the Australian Academy of Science in 2012. In 2018 he received the Lifetime Achievement Award from the International Society for Root Research and was appointed Honorary Professor at Shenyang Agricultural University in China. The following year he became a Distinguished Professor at China Agricultural University and an Honorary Professor at Jiangxi Agricultural University. In 2023 he was awarded Life Membership of the Australian Society of Plant Scientists.
