= Alice Albertson Shurrocks =

American botanist and botanical collector

- Born: Alice Owen Albertson; February 10, 1880
- Died: January 13, 1967 (aged 86)
- Occupation: Botanist

Alice Albertson Shurrocks (née Alice Owen Albertson February 10, 1880 – January 13, 1967) was an American botanist.

== Background ==
Shurrocks was a cousin of Maria Mitchell, a professional astronomer and naturalist, and she spent several decades collecting and contributing local Native American artifacts to the Natural Science Department of the Maria Mitchell Association. Shurrocks married the architect Benjamin Francis Shurrocks in 1929. Shurrocks and her husband collected roughly 1,000 Native Wampanoag arrowheads, spear points, pottery sherds, and other items in the 1930s and donated these to Nantucket Historical Association in 1940. Shurrocks kept journals to detail where and when the item was found, its condition and the type of artefact. This collection is particularly important as it shows the range of indigenous activity on Nantucket prior to English settlement.

Shurrocks also collected botanical samples, particularly lichens, many of which are now held in the Harvard University Herbaria.

Shurrocks wrote a memoir titled "Two Steps Down" published in 1953, followed by "A Grain of Mustard Seed" in 1958, which documents the flora of Nantucket.
