= Henri Homblé =

Belgian agronomist and botanical collector (1883–1921)

Henri Antoine Homblé (3 September 1883 – 10 October 1921) was a Belgian agronomist and botanical collector who worked primarily in what was then Belgian Congo (now the Democratic Republic of the Congo) in Africa, but also in Romania, Algeria and China. He collected numerous herbarium specimens which form an important part of the collection of Meise Botanic Garden. Homblé's plant collections from the Katanga Province between 1911 and 1913 were some of the first from the region, and more than 100 species of African plants are named after him.

Ambiguous labelling of Homblé's collections caused significant confusion in the taxonomy of several plant genera which persisted into the 21st century.

== Early life ==
Homblé was born in Antwerp on 3 September 1883, the son of Charles-Jean Homblé and Marie-Rosalie-Alexandrine Embrechts. He obtained a degree from the Institut Agronomique de Gembloux.
