= Valiollah Mozaffarian =

Iranian botanist (born 1953)

- ولی‌الله مظفریان
- Born: 1953 (age 72–73); Damavand, Iran
- Education: University of Tehran
- Known for: Flora of Iran; taxonomy of Apiaceae
- Scientific career
- Fields: Botany, plant taxonomy
- Workplaces: Research Institute of Forests and Rangelands
- Author abbrev. (botany): Mozaff.

Valiollah Mozaffarian (Persian: ولی‌الله مظفریان; born 1953) is an Iranian botanist who specialises in the flora of Iran, in particular the family Apiaceae (Umbelliferae). For most of his career he worked at the Research Institute of Forests and Rangelands in Tehran, where he described several new plant species and two genera, Kelussia and Opsicarpium. His standard author abbreviation is Mozaff.

== Early life and education ==
Mozaffarian was born in 1953 in Damavand, where he completed his schooling. He entered the Faculty of Natural Resources at the University of Tehran in 1971 and graduated in 1977. He later returned to the university for graduate study, completing a master's degree in 1989 and a doctorate in plant sciences, with a focus on plant taxonomy, in 2002.

== Career ==
After graduating, Mozaffarian joined the National Botanical Garden of Iran, and continued as a researcher in the botany department of the Research Institute of Forests and Rangelands after the garden was incorporated into the institute. His first book, The Family of Umbelliferae in Iran: Keys and Distribution, was published in English in 1983. He became a member of the institute's academic staff in 1983 and retired as a research professor in 2017.

Much of his fieldwork was devoted to collecting and identifying plants across Iran; the specimens he gathered are held in the central herbarium of the Research Institute of Forests and Rangelands. Alongside his taxonomic work he wrote several volumes of the Flora of Iran and a number of reference dictionaries of plant names.

== Taxonomic work ==
Mozaffarian described a number of plant species new to science and reported many others from Iran for the first time. In 2003 he described two new genera of Apiaceae, Kelussia and Opsicarpium. Species he described include Kelussia odoratissima, Convolvulus elymaiticus and Echinops procerus.

Several plants have been named in his honour. The monotypic Apiaceae genus Mozaffariania, described by Michael Pimenov and Ali Asghar Maassoumi in 2003, commemorates him; a molecular study later found the genus to occupy an isolated position within the Iranian Umbelliferae. The species Dionysia mozaffarianii and Mentha mozaffarianii are also named after him.

== Selected works ==
- The Family of Umbelliferae in Iran: Keys and Distribution (1983)
- A Dictionary of Iranian Plant Names (1996)
- Trees and Shrubs of Iran (2004)
- Identification of Medicinal and Aromatic Plants of Iran (2012)

== See also ==
- Flora of Iran
