= Gertrude Clarke Nuttall =

British writer, botanist and lichenologist (1867–1929)

Gertrude Clarke Nuttall (15 August 1867 – 4 May 1929) was a British botanist and science writer. She was one of the first women to take a degree in botany. She is best known as the author of the text for Wild Flowers as they Grow (1911), a book with colored photographs by H. Essenhigh Corke.

== Life ==
Gertrude Clarke was born on 15 August 1867 at 1 Charles Street, Humberstone Gate, Leicester, to surgeon Dr. Julius St. Thomas Clarke and his wife. She was one of the first women to take a degree in botany, however, it is not known in which British university she was educated.

In 1893, Clarke married Dr. Charles Nuttall in Leicester.

Gertrude Clarke Nuttall wrote many semipopular botanical articles, and in collaboration with H. Essenhigh Corke published Wild Flowers as they Grow (1911), Trees and how they Grow (1913), and Beautiful Flowering Shrubs (1920). Each of three works ran to several editions.

During World War I, she went to France with the British Red Cross and was in charge of recreation huts there.

Gertrude Clarke Nuttall died on 4 May 1929 in St. Albans, Hertfordshire, aged 61.

== Works ==
- 1905 – Guide to Leicester and Neighbourhood
- 1906 – French Prisoners in England: a side-light on the wars of Napoleon
- 1911 - Wild Flowers as they Grow
- 1913 - Trees and how they Grow
- 1920 - Beautiful Flowering Shrubs
