= Shri Mohan Jain =

Indian scientist (born 1949)

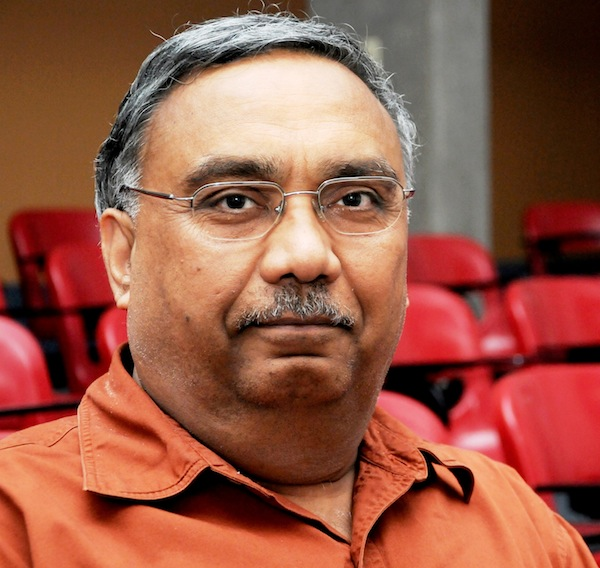
- Born: 5 December 1949 (age 76); New Delhi, India
- Scientific career
- Fields: Plant breeding, Genetics, Mutation, Biotechnology, Rural development, Conservation genetics

Shri Mohan Jain is an Indian-born plant biotechnology scientist. He worked several years for the International Atomic Energy Agency in Vienna. He has done research on genetically modified food, mutation breeding, ornamental plants, date palm, and tropical fruit, such as banana. He has edited 44 internationally sold books.

He was listed in Marquis Who's Who in the World 13th edition, 1996 and Who's Who in Science & Engineering, 4th edition, 1997.

== Education ==
Jain completed his bachelor's degree at the Chaudhary Charan Singh Haryana Agricultural University in Hisar, Haryana, India (1966–1970). After that he continued his studies to receive a Master of Science from the Genetics department at the G.B. Pant University of Agriculture and Technology in Pantnagar, Nainital, India (1970–1972).

In 1972 he started his studies in Master of Philosophy in Jawaharlal Nehru University in New Delhi, India and finally completed his studies with PhD from the same university in 1978.

== Research areas ==
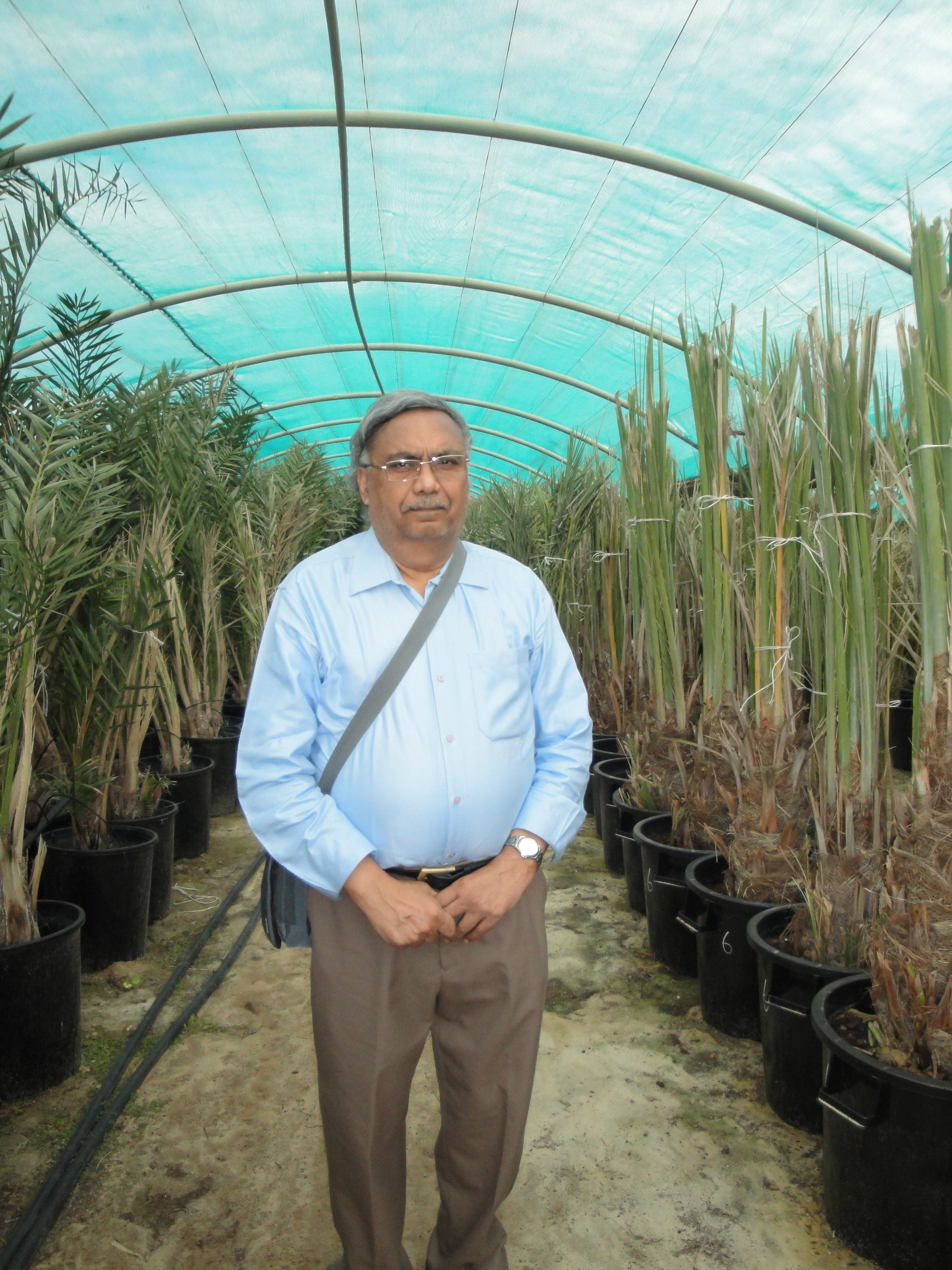
Shri Mohan Jain researching date palm in Kuwait in 2013.

Jain's research interests include Date palm, Arbequina, and Bananas and plantains to make a more stable and profitable crop by innovative approaches and conventional breeding. Other significant research areas are potato and ornamental plants, such as rose, begonia, orchids, African violets, and brassicas.
