= James Alexander Gammie =

Scottish gardener and botanist

James Alexander Gammie (12 November 1839 - 13 April 1924) was a Kew-trained Scottish gardener and botanist known for his work in raising cinchona plantations in Mungpoo in northeastern India and in introducing a process for the extraction of cinchona alkaloids at the factory in Rungbee.

Gammie was born in Kincardine to George Gammie and Jean Silver. Gammie apprenticed at Drum Castle, Aberdeenshire, where his father was gardener for 45 years. He worked at Stapleton Park and with J. Veitch in Chelsea. He joined Kew in 1861 along with W.B. Hemsley and J.R. Jackson working for about four years until he was selected by the Secretary of State for India in August 1865 to manage the cinchona plantations in Sikkim. He moved to India and worked for eleven years retiring in 1897. An achievement was in the introduction of C.H. Wood's process for extracting the cinchona alkaloid using a solvent, fusel alcohol, from which the alkaloids were precipitated as sulphates using sulphuric acid. He was elected president of the Kew Guild in 1918.

He collected plants for Sir George King and the Calcutta Herbarium and also studied mammals, birds and reptiles for the Indian museum. He was a friend of H.J. Elwes (hosting him on occasion and organizing Lepcha guides for him) and took an interest in the local butterflies, moths and the beetles of Sikkim. Gammie also collected and made observations on birds which he communicated to Allan Octavian Hume, who as Secretary of State also supported his work at the cinchona plantations. The snake Lycodon gammiei was named after him.

Gammie married Mary Parrell at St Mary's Parish Church, Ealing on 28 January 1864 and they had nine children, the oldest of whom, George Gammie, became a botanist.

He died at his home on 1 Harvard road, Chiswick and was buried at Old Chiswick Cemetery on April 17, 1924. The funeral was attended by David Prain and a number of his old colleagues. The value of his estate at the time of death was £5206 7s and his net personal property was £3972 8s.
