= George Gammie =

British botanist

George Alexander Gammie FLS (11 September 1864 – 5 May 1934) was a British botanist who worked in India. He worked on a variety of plant groups including those of economic interest such as cotton and contributed to the knowledge of plants used during famines in India.

George Gammie was born in Old Brentford, Middlesex, to Scottish gardener and botanist James Alexander Gammie (1839–1924) and Mary (née Parrell). His father was superintendent in the cinchona plantations at Mungpu. James had come to India and replaced Robert Scott at the Calcutta botanical garden in 1866. Later he moved to Mungpu and John Scott was given the post of Curator of the Calcutta Garden.

George Gammie grew up at Mungpu and became interested in the plants of the region. He worked as an assistant in Mungpu from 1881 to 1899 and went on collecting tours to Sikkim and the Brahmaputra Valley. He was placed in charge of the Saharanpur Garden around 1891-92 and the Lloyd Botanic Garden at Darjeeling around 1893 and was for some time between 1893 and 1896, a Curator at the Calcutta Botanic Gardens.

He joined the Government of Bombay in 1899 and worked with the Botanical Survey of India at Poona working as Economic Botanist from 1904-1908.

He published a monograph on The Indian Cottons in 1907. Gammie's final posting was as Imperial Cotton Specialist, a position he held till his retirement in 1919.

He was elected Fellow of the Linnean Society in 1899. Noted as a genial, slow-moving man of massive build, he was a favourite at conferences of the Indian Imperial Board of Agriculture.

He died in 1934 at his home in Chiswick, Brentford, Middlesex..
