= Veitch =

Veitch or Vetch is a Scottish surname, and may refer to:

== Veitch ==
- Arthur Veitch (1844–1880), horticulturist
- Bill Veitch (1870–1961), New Zealand politician
- Champion Doug Veitch (born 1960), Scottish musician and songwriter
- Charles Veitch (born 1980), British YouTuber and former conspiracy theorist
- Colin Veitch (1881–1938), England and Newcastle United footballer
- Darren Veitch (born 1960), Canadian hockey player
- Edward W. Veitch (1924–2013), American mathematician
- Elwood Veitch (1929-1993), Canadian politician
- Harry Veitch (1840–1924), horticulturist
- Heather Veitch (born 1973/4), American Christian missionary and former stripper
- James Veitch, Lord Elliock (1712–1793), Scottish lawyer and politician, MP for Dumfriesshire 1755–61, judge from 1761
- James Veitch (horticulturist) (1792–1863), horticulturist
- James Veitch, Jr. (1815–1869), horticulturist
- James Herbert Veitch (1868–1907), horticulturist
- James Veitch (comedian) (born 1980), comedian
- Joel Veitch (born 1974), English web animator
- John Veitch (horticulturist) (1752–1839), founder of Veitch Nurseries
- John Veitch (poet) (1829–1894), Scottish poet, philosopher, and historian
- John Gould Veitch (1839–1870), horticulturist whose standard botanical author abbreviation is Veitch
- John Veitch (footballer) (1869–1914), English footballer
- John M. Veitch (born 1945), American horse trainer
- Kristin Veitch (born 1975), TV columnist
- Marion Veitch (1639–1722), Scottish diarist
- Michael Veitch (born 1962), Australian comedian
- Mildred Veitch (1889–1971), horticulturist
- Peter Veitch (1850–1929), horticulturist
- Rick Veitch (born 1951), American comic book artist and writer
- Robert Veitch (1823–1855), horticulturist
- Samuel Veitch or Vetch (1668–1732), Scottish army officer and colonial governor of Nova Scotia
- Sylvester Veitch (1910–1996), horse trainer
- Tom Veitch (1941–2022), American comic book artist and writer
- Tony Veitch (born 1973), New Zealand broadcaster
- William Veitch (1640–1722), Scottish minister
- William Veitch (1794–1885), classical scholar

== Vetch ==
- Hamilton Vetch (1804–1865), Scottish officer of the Bengal Army, brother of James Vetch
- James Vetch (1789–1869), Scottish officer of the Royal Engineers
- Robert Hamilton Vetch (1841–1916), Royal Engineers officer and biographer, son of the above
- Samuel Vetch (1668–1732), Scottish soldier and governor of Nova Scotia

== See also ==
- Veitch Nurseries
- Veatch
