= David Burke (botanist) =

British botanist

David Burke (1854 – 11 April 1897) was one of the most widely travelled plant collectors, who was sent by James Veitch & Sons to collect plants in British Guiana, Burma and Colombia. In his later life, Burke became rather eccentric, preferring the privations of life away from his native England.

== Plant hunter ==
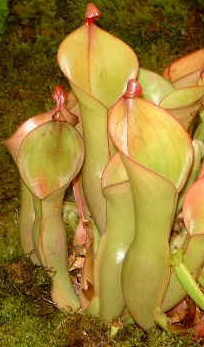
Heliamphora nutans

Burke was born in Kent and joined Veitch as a gardener at Chelsea, London. In 1880, after expressing a desire to travel, he was asked to accompany Charles Curtis on a trial trip to Borneo, where they were instructed by Harry Veitch to collect specimens of Nepenthes northiana; the search for the elusive pitcher plant was unsuccessful, but the pair discovered many other species, including many interesting stove (hot-house) plants, palms, and orchids. At the end of the trip, Burke returned to England with the collection of plants, including large consignments of slipper orchids, Paphiopedilum stonei and P. lowii, as well as many Vandas, Rhododendrons, and the beautiful Stove-foliage plant, Leea amabilis.

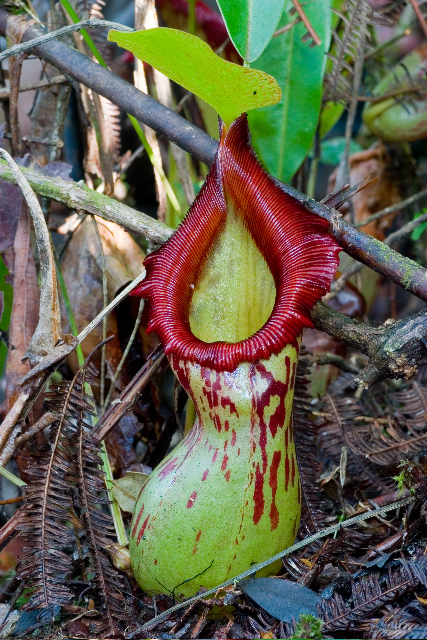
Nepenthes burkei

In 1881, Burke was sent to British Guiana, where he re-discovered the insectivorous plant Heliamphora nutans, which had not been seen since its discovery on Mount Roraima by the two brothers Robert and Richard Schomburgk in 1839, and successfully introduced it to England. Amongst orchids he introduced from British Guiana were the rare Zygopetalum burkei (named after him) and Phragmipedium lindleyanum; from that trip he also sent the stove-house plant Amasonia punicea.

Two years later, Burke visited the Philippines with instructions to search for Phalaenopsis; amongst those he introduced were Phalaenopsis mariae (previously discovered by Frederick William Burbidge in the Sulu Archipelago in 1878), which Burke located on the hills near the south-east coast of the island of Mindanao. On Mindanao, he also discovered Phaius philippinensis on the slopes of the hills at 3,000-4,000 ft. elevation; this was interesting as being the first species of the genus Phaius to be discovered in the Philippines.

In the Philippines, he also discovered and introduced Nepenthes burkei, a species of pitcher plant which was named after him, and Dendrobium taurinum, which he found on Ambon Island.

He subsequently visited New Guinea (twice), from where he introduced Cirrhopetalum robustum and Coelogyne veitchii as well as returning to Burma to search for orchids. During the years 1894 to 1896 he made three trips to Colombia to search for Cattleya mendelii, C. schroedera, C. trianae and Odontoglossum crispum.

== Death and obituary ==
In 1896, having spent a short time in England, Burke embarked on what was to be his final voyage, to the Celebes Islands and the Moluccas. Prior to his departure, he stated: "I’m off again and if I make a good meal for someone I hope I shall give full satisfaction." On 11 April 1897, he died on Ambon Island. The circumstances of his death were reported back to England by a German commercial traveller.

According to Hortus Veitchii, "This traveller (Burke) crossed a greater area of the earth's surface and covered more miles in search of plants than any other Veitchian collector, with the possible exception of the two brothers William and Thomas Lobb." In her biography of the Veitch family, Sue Shephard describes Burke as Harry Veitch's "strangest, longest–serving and most adventurous orchid collector".
