= James Veitch =

James Veitch may refer to:

- James Veitch, Lord Elliock (1712–1793), Scottish advocate, judge, politician and landowner
- James Veitch (comedian), British comedian, director, writer and producer
- James Veitch (horticulturist) (1792–1863), English horticulturist
- James Veitch Jr. (1815–1869), English horticulturist
- James Herbert Veitch (1868–1907), English horticulturist
- James Veitch (minister) (1808–1879), minister of the Church of Scotland, astronomer and geologist
- James Veitch (rugby union), Scottish rugby union player
