= Harry Veitch =

English horticulturist

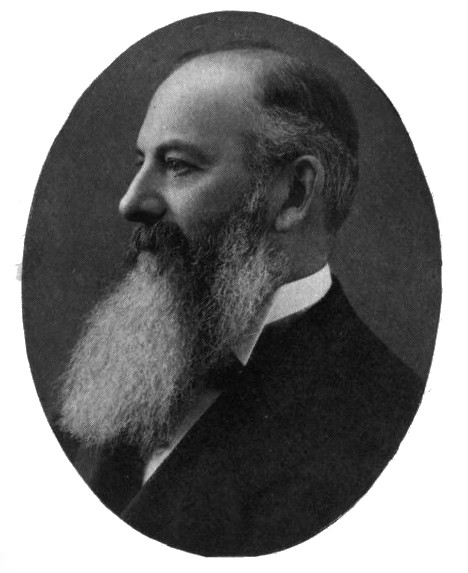

Sir Harry James Veitch (24 June 1840 – 6 July 1924) was an English horticulturist in the nineteenth century, who was the head of the family nursery business, James Veitch & Sons, based in Chelsea, London. He was instrumental in establishing the Chelsea Flower Show, which led to his being knighted for services to horticulture.

== Education and early life ==
Harry was the second son of James Veitch and his wife Harriott (née Gould) and was born in Exeter, England. Like many notable horticulturists, he was of Scottish descent, his great-grandfather, John Veitch having crossed into England toward the close of the eighteenth century to take up the offices of steward and bailiff to Sir Thomas Acland at Killerton, Devon. Veitch was educated at the Exeter Grammar School and at Altona, Hamburg, Germany, before attending the course of botanical lectures given by Dr. John Lindley at the University College, London, where he learnt the management of the seed business. Shortly afterwards, he joined the staff of the French nursery firm, Vilmorin-Andrieux & Co., Paris, where he managed the seed department.

== Veitch Nurseries ==
At the age of eighteen, he returned to England to help his father in the management of the Kings Road, Chelsea nurseries, which had been acquired five years previously from Messrs. Knight and Perry. His industry and business sense rapidly became apparent, and the firm of James Veitch & Sons soon enjoyed the reputation of being the foremost nursery business in the world.

In 1863, the original Exeter branch of the family business and that in Chelsea were separated, with Harry's uncle, Robert, taking over the Exeter firm which became Robert Veitch & Sons. The London branch took the name James Veitch & Sons under Harry's father, James. James died in September 1869, by when the business was under the management of his eldest son, John, who only survived his father by a few months, dying in August 1870 of tuberculosis at the age of 31. Harry, assisted by his younger brother Arthur, then took control of the business of James Veitch & Sons.

Veitch's responsibility, energy, enthusiasm, and keenness in business surprised even those who knew him best. He expanded the business, establishing nurseries at Coombe Wood (trees, shrubs, and herbaceous plants), Feltham (garden plants, florists' flowers, and seed production) and Langley (tree and bush fruits and, later, orchids). With Harry in control, the firm entered into the most prosperous period of its history.

During Veitch's period at the head of the Chelsea business, James Veitch & Sons sent numerous plant collectors across the world to search for new species. Among their collectors during this period were Henry Chesterton (1870–1878), Gustav Wallis (1872–1874), Guillermo Kalbreyer (1876–1881), Frederick William Burbidge (1877–1878), Charles Maries (1877–1879), Charles Curtis (1878–1884) and David Burke (1881–1897). In addition to developing many fine hybrids of Begonia, Streptocarpus, Hippeastrum, Nepenthes, and other genera, the firm had the distinction of raising the first hybrid orchid, Calanthe × dominii, hybridised and grown by their foreman, John Dominy.

In 1898 the firm of James Veitch & Sons was formed into a limited company, of which Harry's nephew, James Herbert Veitch became managing director. One of the first steps taken by the new company, in accordance with the firm's earlier practice, was to send out Ernest Henry Wilson to China and Tibet to collect plants.

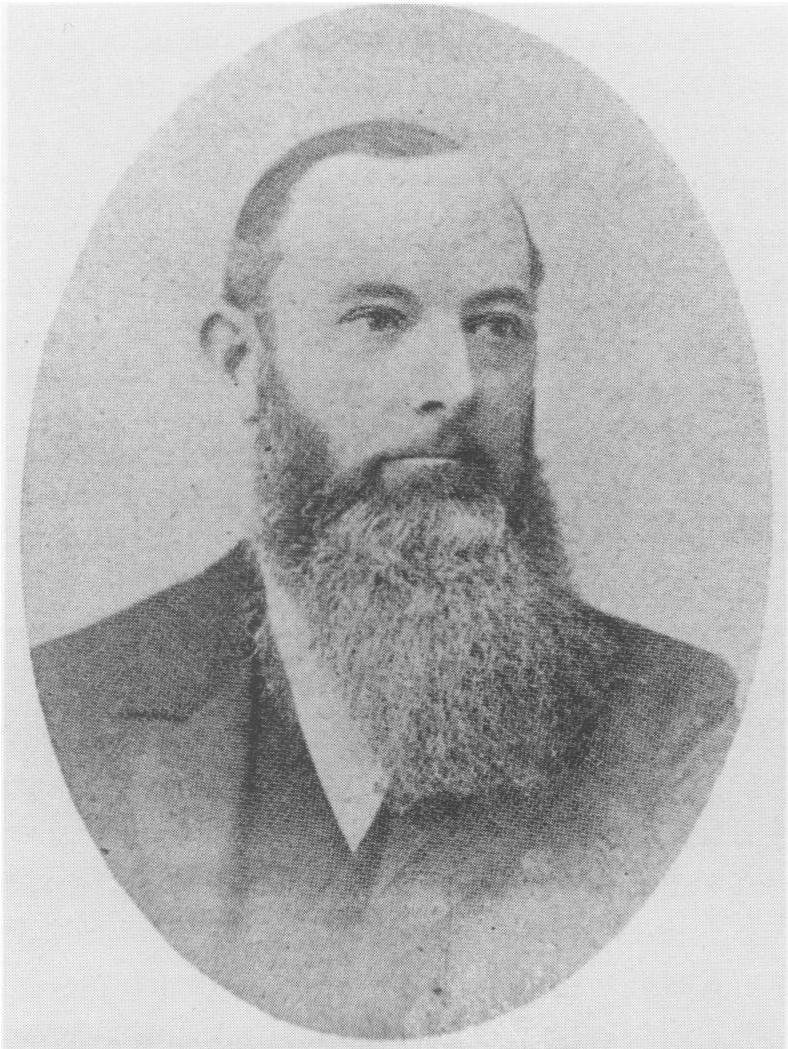

However, the business proved too much for James, who suffered a nervous breakdown. He became withdrawn and eccentric, offended customers, and business began to decline. After his death in 1907 at only 39 years of age, his brother John, a former England international footballer, succeeded to the Chelsea business. He also did not have the ability to run the business successfully, and Harry Veitch returned to take over control and put the business back on track. Following John's death in October 1914 at the age of 45, and the expiry of the lease on the land at Coombe Wood, Sir Harry (who had been knighted in 1912) closed the business, there being no successor in the family. Rather than risk losing the recognised reputation which the firm had acquired, Harry disposed of the nursery and sold the land for redevelopment. The Royal Botanic Gardens, Kew acquired some of Veitch's rare trees and shrubs.

== Public service and the Chelsea Flower Show ==
For over thirty years after 1870, Veitch was a constant visitor at continental horticultural gatherings. As early as 1869, together with Sir Joseph Hooker (director of the Royal Botanic Gardens, Kew), he was among those present at the first international exhibition in Russia, which was held at St. Petersburg.

For nearly twenty-five years, Veitch was chairman of the Gardener's Royal Benevolent Institution, ably conducting its affairs and contributing generously to its funds. He also supported the Royal Gardener's Orphan Fund and the United Horticultural Benefit Club for many years and additionally served as a member of the board of directors of the British Orphan Schools and on the committee of St. Anne's and of the City of London Missions. To all these organisations he gave his patronage freely and his financial assistance liberally.

In 1866, the "Great International Horticultural Exhibition" was held in London; Veitch became a member of the executive committee of 21 members and served on many of the sub-committees. With the proceeds from the exhibition, the Lindley Library was purchased and vested in the Royal Horticultural Society. Veitch was intimately associated with this organisation for many years and helped establish its popularity thereafter.

An annual flower show had first been held in 1862, named the "Royal Horticultural Society's Great Spring Show". Its venue was the R.H.S. garden in Kensington. When that garden was closed in 1888, the show was moved to the gardens of the Inner Temple near the Victoria Embankment. In 1912, the Temple Show was cancelled. However, Sir Harry Veitch brought this event back by securing the grounds of the Royal Hospital, Chelsea for a one-off event, the "Second Great International Horticultural Exhibition". The show was a success and the Great Spring Show was moved there in 1913, where it became the venue of today's annual Chelsea Flower Show.

In 1918, Sir Harry Veitch became Treasurer of the Royal Horticultural Society for one year, having been a member of its Council since 1887 and Chairman of the Orchid Committee for many years.

== Gardens ==
In 1902, Veitch laid out the gardens at Ascott House near Wing, Buckinghamshire for Leopold de Rothschild and his wife.

The gardens at Caerhays Castle, Cornwall, the home of John Charles Williams, (M.P. for Truro), was planted with seeds donated by Harry Veitch from those brought back from China by Ernest Henry Wilson in 1903.

The grounds of Birr Castle, Ireland were planted with trees and shrubs purchased at the sale of Veitch's London nursery in 1914. Included within this collection were a number of Wilson introductions from China; an exceptionally rare Carrierea calycina, specimens of Rhododendron yunnanense and a very fine Magnolia delavayi still survive today.

== Honours ==
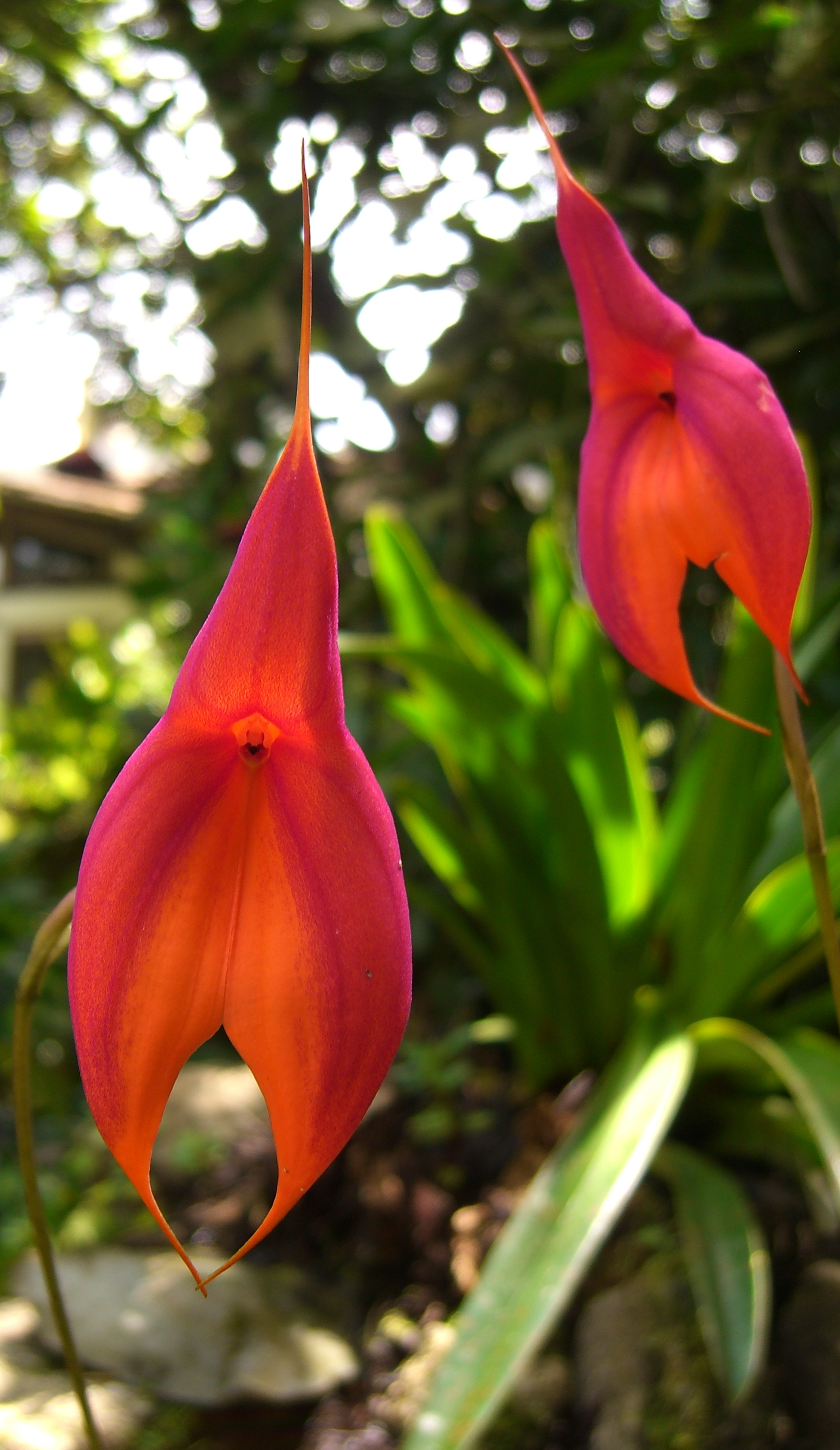
Masdevallia veitchiana

For his services to horticulture, King George V conferred the honour of knighthood upon him in 1912; this was the first time a horticulturist had been given a knighthood.

He also received the Order of the Crown from the Belgian King, the French Legion of Honour, the French Isidore Saint-Hilaire Medal, and the United States' George R. White Gold Medal for eminent services to horticulture. Apart from the knighthood, probably the greatest honour accorded Sir Harry Veitch was the award of the Victoria Medal of Honour in 1906, given by the Royal Horticultural Society, with which he had long been associated and of whose Orchid Committee he was chairman for many years.

== Publications ==
Various publications were issued by Messrs. Veitch while Harry Veitch was head of the firm. "A Manual of the Coniferae" was published in 1888, with a second printing in 1900, and ten parts of the two volume "Manual of Orchidaceous Plants Cultivated Under Glass in Great Britain" were published between 1887 and 1894. A large number of Harry Veitch's own publications appeared in the Journal of the Royal Horticultural Society. These included "Orchids Past and Present" (1881), "Coniferae of Japan" (1892), and "Deciduous Trees and Shrubs of Japan" (1894). He also shared in the production of the history of the house of Veitch, entitled "Hortus Veitchii" (1906).

== Death and legacy ==
Lady Veitch died in 1921, and soon afterward Sir Harry left off his horticultural activities and lived in complete retirement at his homes in Kensington and East Burnham Park, Slough, Buckinghamshire, where he died on 6 July 1924, at the age of eighty-four. In his obituary, published in the Gardeners' Chronicle on 12 July 1924 it was stated,

"Sir Harry Veitch may be regarded as the most outstanding figure in contemporary horticulture, and during the last fifty years no one has exercised so great an influence on all things pertaining to gardening".

During his lifetime Sir Harry and his wife amassed a substantial art collection, which also included decorative art. On his death he bequeathed the entire collection to the Royal Albert Memorial Museum in Exeter, including works by Myles Birket Foster (1825–1899) and Kate Greenaway (1846–1901).

At the end of every July, the Royal Albert Memorial Museum holds the "Veitch Memorial Lecture ", a plant-orientated lecture in memory of Sir Harry Veitch.

Sir Harry's name lives on, with the beautiful Masdevallia harryana and Masdevallia veitchiana, which were discovered by Veitchian collectors, being named in his honour. Other plants named in his honour include Oncidium harryanum ("Harry's Odontoglossum"), Viburnum harryanum ("Sir Harry Veitch's Viburnum") and Nepenthes × harryana.
