= Charles Curtis (botanist) =

English botanist (1853–1928)

Charles Curtis (1853 – 23 August 1928) was an English botanist who was sent by James Veitch & Sons to search for new plant species in Madagascar, Borneo, Sumatra, Java and the Moluccas, before settling in Penang, where he became the first superintendent of the Penang Botanic Gardens.

== Early days ==
Curtis was born in Barnstaple, Devon, the youngest of four brothers. His paternal grandfather, a Norman by the name of Courtois, had settled at Barnstaple many years previously. Like his brothers, Curtis worked as a garden boy at the local Bale's Nursery. On completing his education, Curtis joined James Veitch & Sons' Royal Exotic Nursery at Chelsea, London in 1874, where he received his botanical training in the "New Plant Department".

== Plant hunting ==
In 1878, Harry Veitch despatched him to Mauritius and Madagascar, from where he sent seeds of Nepenthes madagascariensis, a species of pitcher plant, and various other tropical plants, including Angraecum sesquipedale. Unfortunately, following "treachery" by one of the African helpers, who cut the rope which held the raft on which the plants were being floated downriver, the first consignment of plants collected was lost and, as a result, the collecting work had to be repeated.

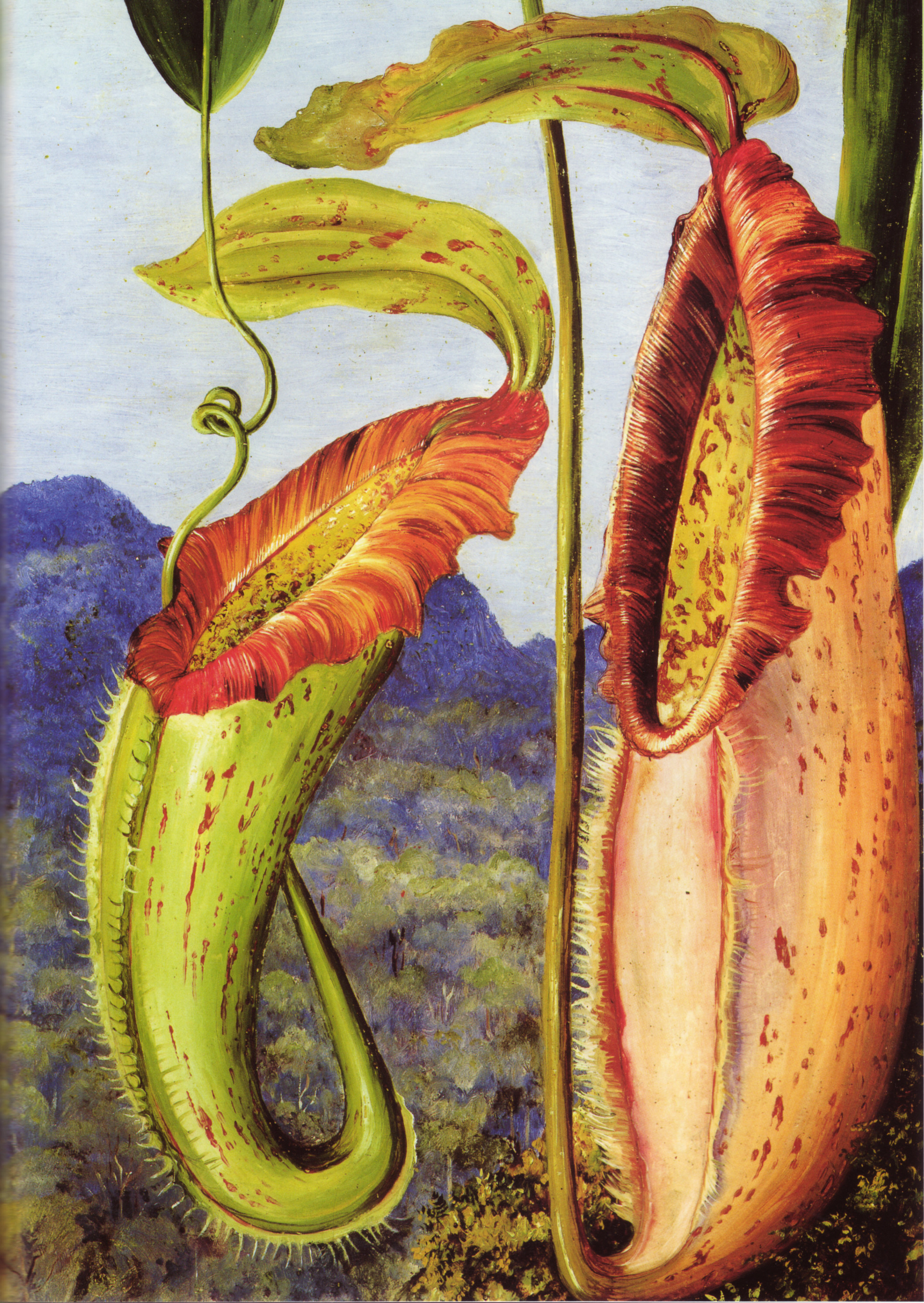
Marianne North's painting of Nepenthes northiana, showing a lower and an upper pitcher

Curtis returned to England in 1879, but a year later was sent to the Dutch East Indies, where he explored Borneo, Sumatra, Java and the Moluccas. Veitch instructed him to collect specimens of Nepenthes northiana, which had been discovered by Marianne North in Borneo, although the precise locality where the plant grew was unknown. On the trip to Borneo, Curtis was accompanied by a young gardener, David Burke, who later became a plant collector himself. The search for the elusive pitcher plant was unsuccessful, but the pair discovered many other species, including many interesting stove (hot-house) plants, palms, and orchids. At the end of the trip, Curtis accompanied Burke to Singapore, from where Burke returned to England with the collection of plants, including large consignments of the slipper orchids, Paphiopedilum stonei and P. lowii, as well as many Vandas, Rhododendrons, and the beautiful foliage plant for British hot-houses, Leea amabilis.

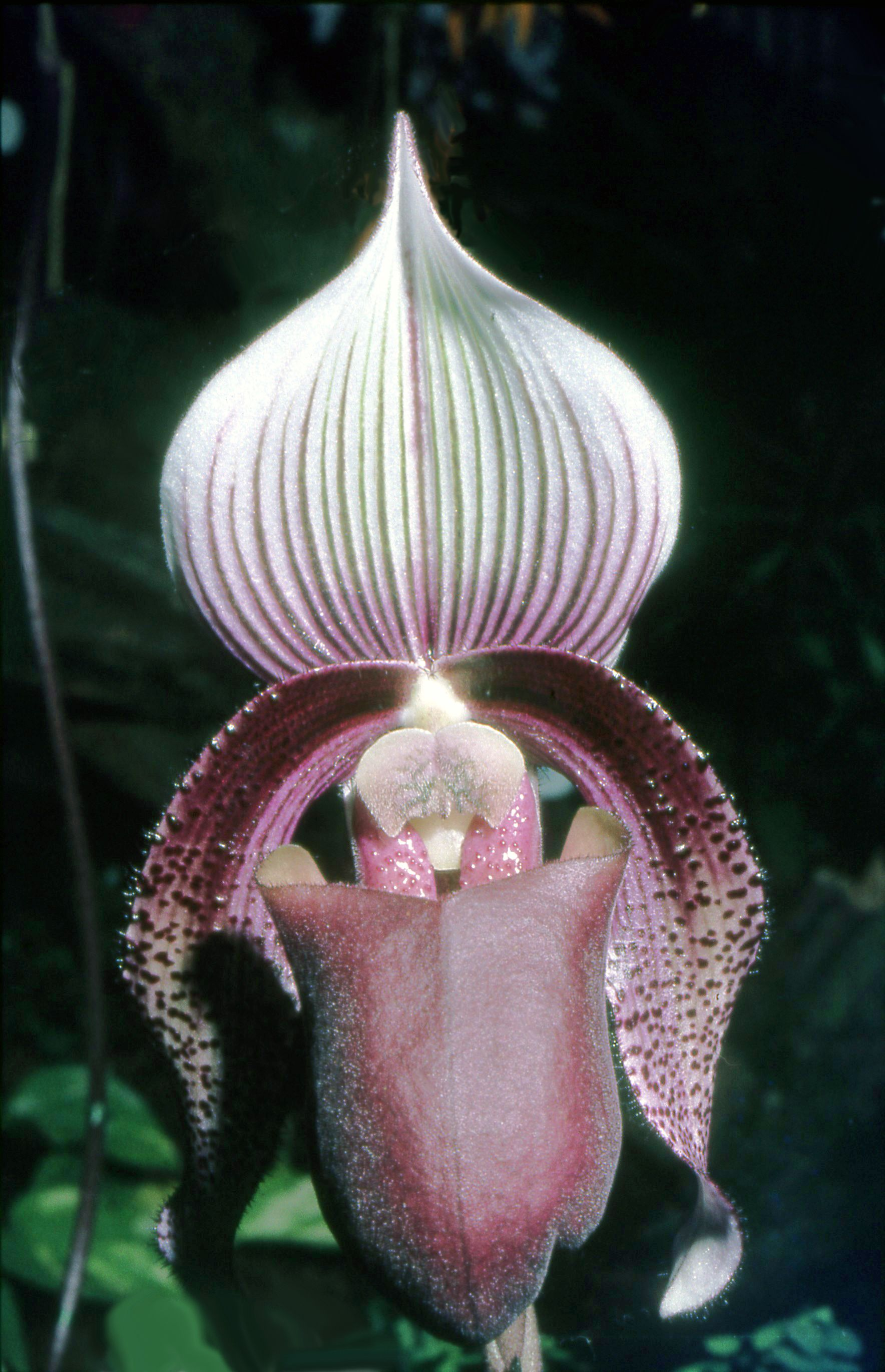
Paphiopedilum superbiens

From Singapore, Curtis travelled to Pontianak in Dutch Borneo, with the special object of obtaining a consignment of Phalaenopsis violacea, then known in England but still rare. He was successful in locating the plant, but again, owing to a mishap with the boat, a month's collections and all his clothes and instruments were lost, and he narrowly escaped with his life.

In 1882, Curtis eventually located Nepenthes northiana in Borneo and sent seeds back to Chelsea, as well as N. stenophylla and seed from a plant that became known as N. curtisii, although now known as N. maxima. Curtis was not meticulous in recording where he located individual plants – although it was originally believed that he collected N. curtisii in Borneo, Charles Clarke points out that he also visited Sulawesi on the same trip, and N. maxima is common there. He also sent back the orchid which was originally named Paphiopedilum curtisii, although now known as a synonym for Paphiopedilum superbiens; Curtis did not reveal where he found the plants, other than saying that this was in Sumatra.

According to the account in Hortus Veitchii, Curtis had been commissioned to go in search of Nepenthes northiana, and

"after long and unsuccessful effort, Curtis gave up hope, under the impression that Miss North had been wrongly informed, but fortunately before leaving the district it occurred to him to look over a steep escarpment in the hill-side, accomplished by lying prostrate on the ground, when to his great joy he discovered the long-looked-for plant some distance below. He succeeded in gathering ripe capsules, and lost no time in transmitting them to Chelsea, where the seed soon germinated",

and was introduced in the James Veitch & Sons catalogue in 1883.

Other plants introduced to England by Curtis, include two species of Vireya rhododendron – Rhododendron multicolor (with the red variety Curtisii named after him) and R. teysmannii (now considered to be subspecies of R. javanicum) – before he terminated his engagement with Veitch early in 1884.

== Honours ==
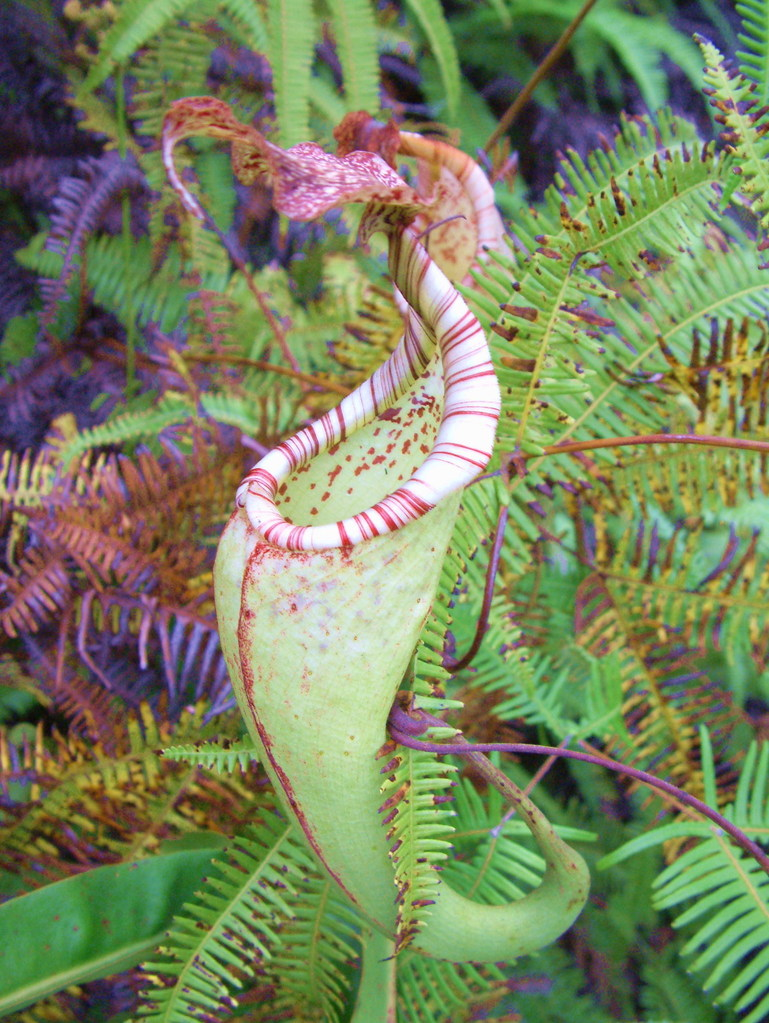
Nepenthes maxima

Amongst the many plant species named after Curtis in recognition of his services to botany and horticulture were the following:

- Acanthephippium curtisii
- Cirrhopetalum curtisii
- Gastrochilus curtisii
- Hexapora curtisii
- Luisia curtisii
- Medinilla curtisii
- Nepenthes curtisii (subsequently synonymised with Nepenthes maxima)
- Paphiopedilum curtisii (subsequently synonymised with Paphiopedilum superbiens)
- Pentace curtisii
- Rhododendron multicolor var. curtisii
- Shorea curtisii (dark red meranti)

He was also honoured by the genus Curtisina, but the only member of the genus, Curtisina penangensis, was subsequently identified as a taxonomic synonym of Dacryodes longifolia.

== Penang Botanic Gardens ==
In mid-1884, following a recommendation from Kew Gardens, Curtis was appointed to the position as Assistant Superintendent of Forests and Gardens under the Straits Settlements administration. Curtis reported to a Superintendent, Nathaniel Cantley, who was also the Curator of the Singapore Botanic Gardens. Curtis was placed in charge of the Penang region of the Forest and Gardens Department, which included the "Waterfall Gardens", together with some 3,575 ha of forest reserves. The forest reserves included areas reserved for recreational, fuel, forestry harvesting and protection purposes, mostly on Penang Island. The Forests and Gardens Department was initially engaged mainly in the cultivation of essential commercial plants, inspecting crops and advising the planting community.

When the department's work in connection with economic crops and forestry was taken over by the Agriculture and Forestry Departments, Curtis was appointed the first superintendent of the newly re-created Penang Botanic Gardens, responsible for the layout of the gardens, and their transformation from an old granite quarry site. The Gardens, as distinct from the Forest Reserves, became Curtis' passion. Curtis was presented with a tropical valley, including a nutmeg plantation with associated structures, and a prominent location on the trail to and at the foot of the "Great Waterfall". While an avid and acknowledged botanist and plant collector, he proved himself to be a creative landscape designer in crafting the design and development of the Gardens.

On accepting the position, Curtis proposed a long-term strategy as to the development of the gardens and its potential role as a botanical repository and clearing house. Curtis' immediate actions were to develop a plant nursery and undertake a programme of works to create a pleasurable recreational and botanical garden in the valley. This vision was spelt out in detail in his 1885 annual report to Cantley as part of the Department's Annual Report. This included proposals to extend and develop the existing "Waterfall Gardens", the construction of road circuits, the erection of plant-houses for the propagation and cultivation of various species, and the provision of recreational venues.

His immediate steps in 1885–86 were focussed upon increasing the area of the Gardens in the valley together with improving road and pedestrian access. In his 1885 report, Curtis commented on "the poor gravelly soil in the valley" which required that considerable attention should be given to the preparation of the ground for tree planting. However, the "natural advantages of the surroundings, from a landscape gardening point of view, ... in a great measure compensate for this defect."

From the outset, Curtis introduced aesthetic considerations into the design of the Gardens, through the strategic placement of trees and the clearance of jungle. The circular road circuits he had constructed carefully weave through the valley opening up views, framing vantage points, and providing surprises to the visitor. Curtis' design was motivated by his objective to take advantage of and exploit the natural landscape in the first instance, and then locate plantings in functional or species family associations. A later curator, Frederick Sydney Banfield, observed of the planting design structure established by Curtis that: "There is little systematic arrangement even in the botanical sections, the principal aim having been to arrange the plants in such a way as to enhance the natural beauty of the Gardens".

On short leaves of absence he made collections of both living and herbarium specimens at Penang, Burma and neighbouring coastal areas. On some of the trips he was accompanied by Henry Nicholas Ridley, superintendent of The Singapore Botanic Gardens. Both men were interested in the development of the rubber industry, and experiments they made in Penang proved exceedingly valuable to planters.

Curtis' health began to deteriorate from 1890 onwards. He took leave of absence from Penang "on account of ill-health" from 26 January to 25 December 1891. Curtis blamed his ill-health on the quality and location of the accommodation made available to him. Returning in December 1891, Curtis spent another five months at the quarters "during which the health of myself and family suffered severely from fever" forcing him to vacate the house and rent accommodation elsewhere.

His 1892 Annual Report includes "A list of the more important Plants and Trees flowered in the Botanic Gardens, Penang, 1892", and provides an extensive review of the flowering species in the Gardens' collection. Two years later he published "An Extensive Catalogue of Flowering Plants and Ferns Found Growing Wild in the island of Penang" in the Journal of the Straits Branch of the Royal Asiatic Society: containing 1,971 species of 793 genera and 129 natural orders, it is a significant record of Malaysian flora.

Curtis also maintained his professional association with the Veitch family during his tenure as Assistant Superintendent. Often forwarding specimens to their nursery, he always visited them while on leave in England, and James Herbert Veitch reported on the Gardens during a visit in 1896, as part of an extensive tour of inspection of South East Asian and Australasian botanic gardens and public gardens, in his "Traveller's Notes" (1896).

In March 1903, Curtis took early long service leave due to a "complete breakdown in February" from fever. Walter Fox was appointed Superintendent on 7 December 1903, "the date of Mr Curtis's retirement".

Following his appointment, Fox reflected that Curtis' administration was one of important developments in Penang:

"In Curtis's retirement the Government loses an able conscientious and hardworking officer. It falls to the lot of few men on their retirement to leave their life's work in so visible and concrete a form. Eighteen years ago the site of the present beautiful Gardens was practically a waste ground. It is now the pride of the Colony and the admiration of all who visit it".

Ridley recorded in 1910 that "Mr Curtis was a man full of energy and skill as a landscape gardener and was not to be daunted by difficulties".

== Retirement ==
Following his retirement, his main herbarium was transferred to the Singapore Botanic Gardens. Curtis returned to England, settling in his native town of Barnstaple, in Devon, where he spent his retirement tending his own collection of peach trees, carnations, orchids, sweet peas, streptocarpus, and meconopsis in a garden close to Barnstaple Victoria Road railway station.

In the summer of 1928 he fell ill and in need of an operation in hospital. For a while it appeared as though he might make a full recovery, but five weeks after surgery, on 23 August, he died at his home at Barnstaple.
