= Peter Veitch =

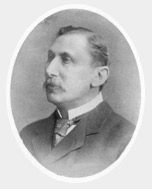

Peter Christian Massyn Veitch (February 1850 – 1929) was a member of the family of horticulturists who established the renowned family business Veitch Nurseries.

== Early days ==
Veitch was the son of Robert Veitch and was born in the Cape of Good Hope in South Africa, where his father was farming, before his father returned to England to join the family nursery company in 1856.

In 1867, he was employed by the London branch of the family business under his uncle James Veitch Jr., working at the Coombe Wood nurseries as an assistant nurseryman in the "Trees & Shrubs" department, before transferring to work in the "New Plant" department at Chelsea, London, where he stayed until 1869. He was then sent to a seed-growing establishment in Germany, and then to a seed-house in France for six months, before returning to Chelsea.

== Plant hunting ==
By 1875, James Veitch & Sons was under the control of Peter's cousin, Harry Veitch, who dispatched him "to visit, on behalf of the firm, the clients in Australasia, and, at the same time, introduce to England any plants likely to be of value for horticultural purposes."

Peter left England in 1875 for Sydney, by the long sea route. He spent little time there, before leaving for Fiji, having an offer to sail in H.M. schooner "Renard". Several months were spent in visiting the various islands of the Fiji group and in collecting plants. In February 1876, a trading vessel having called at Fiji, Veitch secured a passage and proceeded to the South Sea Islands, where he remained until the following September. The whole of the collection of plants made in the Fiji Islands was lost in a gale, but that from the South Sea Islands was despatched to England in 1877.

From September to December 1876 he made excursions to various parts of the Australian Colonies, where he found various ferns including Lomaria discolor, L. discolor bipinnatifida and Microlepia hirta cristata, which were sent to England for cultivation.

During the early part of 1877, a visit was made to New Zealand, including visiting Mount Cook, where seeds of the beautiful Ranunculus lyalli were gathered and sent to Chelsea, from which plants were raised and flowered. From other parts of New Zealand several species of Celmisia and Veronica were introduced, as well as "the beautiful and somewhat difficult" Notospartium carmichaeliae.

In June 1877, Veitch again visited Australia, but in August, as he was making his way to New Guinea, he had the misfortune to be shipwrecked off the north coast of Australia, and once again the collections were lost.

His 1877–78 exploration of Mount Kinabalu in Borneo with Frederick William Burbidge yielded many extraordinary carnivorous Nepenthes. Amongst the species they also re-discovered was Paphiopedilum dayanum, which had been originally discovered by Sir Hugh Low in 1858. In the spring of 1878, he returned to Chelsea, bringing with him the collection that he had made in Borneo in company with Burbidge.

== Robert Veitch & Sons ==
In 1880, he joined his father in the Exeter branch of the family business, bringing his experiences of French and German nurseries into the company as well as an element of flair from the Chelsea nursery. Peter Veitch was a plantsman with a keen interest in trees and shrubs which he turned into a speciality for the Exeter nurseries. When his father died in 1885 Peter became head of the Exeter nurseries and played a very active part in the life of the city. He was a keen sportsman, a Governor of the Royal Devon and Exeter Hospital, and served on a number of committees.

In 1907, he succeeded in crossing Magnolia campbellii (with striking, large, saucer-shaped pink flowers) and Magnolia denudata (which has erect, cup-shaped, lemon-scented flowers and pristine white petals which are thick and fleshy) to produce Magnolia x veitchii, with purple-pink flowers. In 1971, the plant was given the cultivar name "Peter Veitch" in honour of its raiser and to differentiate it from the white flowered cultivar "Isca".

In 1917 he was awarded the Victoria Medal of Honour, the second member of the family to be so honoured following his cousin Harry in 1906.

Following Peter's death in 1929, the Exeter nurseries were run by his daughter Anna Mildred (1889 – 1971), who continued to operate the business until shortly before she died.

== Family ==
He was married to Harriett Drew, and amongst their children was Major John Leonard Veitch M.C., who was killed in northern France on 21 May 1918, aged 31. He is buried at the Thiennes British Military Cemetery.
