= Arthur Veitch =

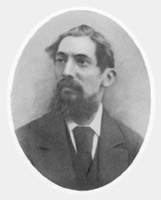

Arthur Veitch (1844–1880) was one of a long line of horticulturists who established the renowned family business Veitch Nurseries.

Arthur was the son of James Veitch, Jr., who had established the Chelsea, London branch of the family business. Whilst his brothers, John (1839–1870) and Harry (1840–1924), were to make significant marks on the history of the English garden, little is recorded about Arthur, and he is conspicuously absent from "Hortus Veitchii", the family history. In the census return of 1871 he is listed as "Nurseryman".

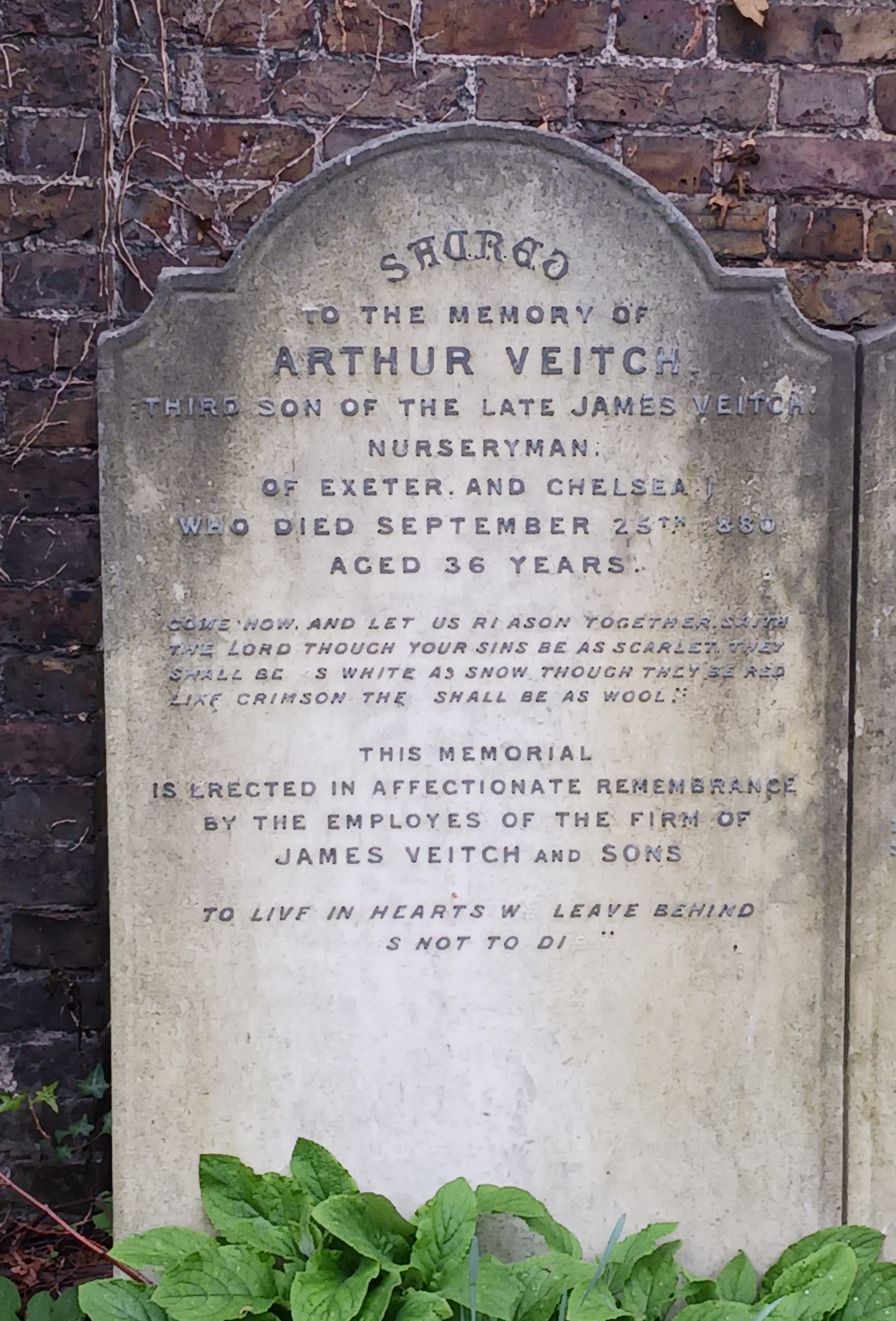
Arthur Veitch Memorial Brompton Cemetery

He is recorded in the 1871 census as living at 5 Oakfield Street, Chelsea with his wife, Emily. The house had been constructed in the 1860s and the plans were drawn by the architect, George Godwin. His memorial stone in Brompton Cemetery, close to where he lived and died in Edith Grove, states: "This memorial is erected in affectionate remembrance by the employees of the firm of James Veitch & Sons." (see photograph). The death records from the Brompton Registers on Find My Past show that his wife arranged for him to removed from Brompton at a later date.
