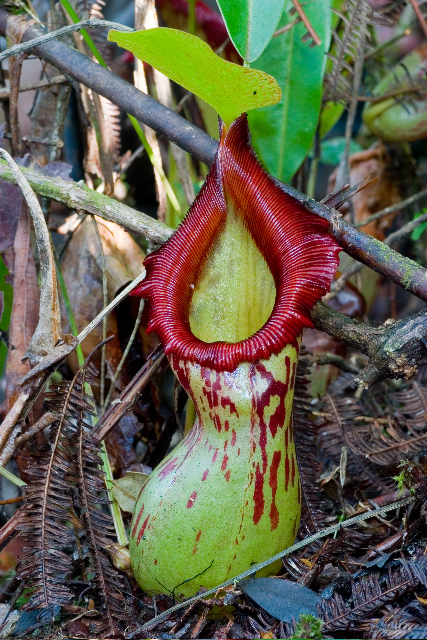
- Nepenthes burkei lower pitcher. Mount Halcon, Mindoro.

Scientific classification
- Kingdom: Plantae
- Clade: Tracheophytes
- Clade: Angiosperms
- Clade: Eudicots
- Order: Caryophyllales
- Family: Nepenthaceae
- Genus: Nepenthes
- Species: N. burkei

Binomial name
- Nepenthes burkei Veitch ex Mast.

Synonyms
- Heterotypic Synonyms: Nepenthes burkei var. excellens H.J.Veitch; Nepenthes burkei var. prolifica Mast.

= Nepenthes burkei =

Species of pitcher plant from the Philippines

Nepenthes burkei is a species of flowering plant in the family Nepenthaceae. It is a tropical pitcher plant named after British plant collector David Burke, that is native to the island of Mindoro in the Philippines, where it grows at an elevation of 1100–2000 m. It is very closely related to N. sibuyanensis and N. ventricosa. It has only recently entered wider cultivation.

== Infraspecific taxa ==
Two varieties of N. burkei have been described.

- Nepenthes burkei var. excellens Hort.Veitch ex Marshall (1890)
- Nepenthes burkei var. prolifica Mast. (1890)

== Natural hybrids ==
- N. alata × N. burkei
