= Phalaenopsis Harriettiae =

Hybrid orchid

- Genus: Phalaenopsis
- Hybrid parentage: Phalaenopsis amabilis × Phalaenopsis violacea
- Grex: Harriettiae
- Breeder: John Veitch, 1887

Phalaenopsis Harriettiae was the first man-made Phalaenopsis hybrid. It was registered in 1887 by John Veitch, who created it at the Veitch Nurseries. P. Harriettiae is a hybrid of the naturally occurring Phalaenopsis amabilis and Phalaenopsis violacea. It may be treated as a grex, and has also been given a hybrid name, Phalaenopsis × harriettae Rolfe.

Cultivars include:

- Phalaenopsis Harriettiae 'Georgina Bow'
- Phalaenopsis Harriettiae 'Louis'
