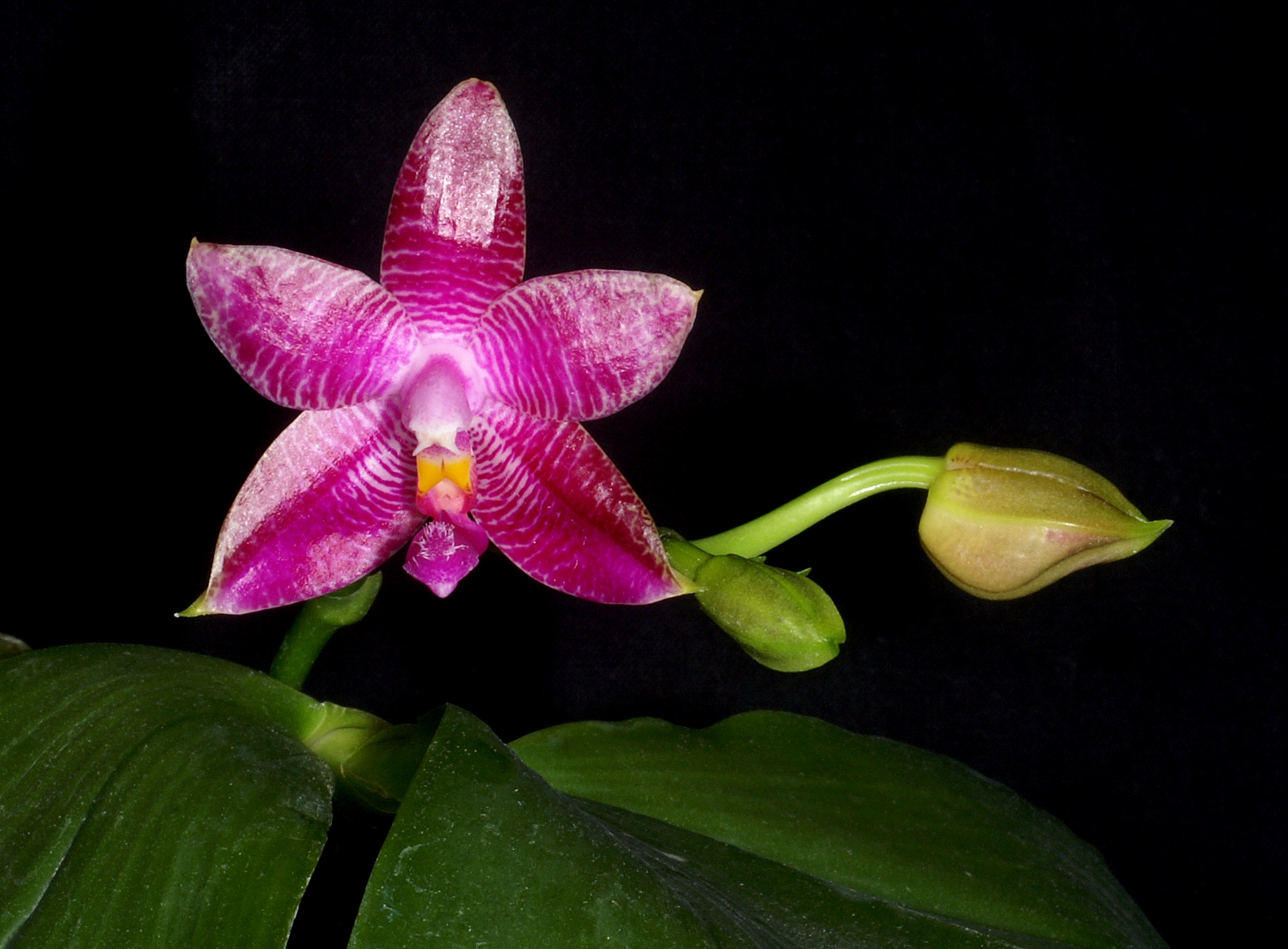

Scientific classification
- Kingdom: Plantae
- Clade: Tracheophytes
- Clade: Angiosperms
- Clade: Monocots
- Order: Asparagales
- Family: Orchidaceae
- Subfamily: Epidendroideae
- Genus: Phalaenopsis
- Species: P. × gersenii

Binomial name
- Phalaenopsis × gersenii (Teijsm. & Binn.) Rolfe

Synonyms
- Phalaenopsis violacea var. schroederiana Rchb.f.; Polychilos × gersenii (Teijsm. & Binn.) Shim

= Phalaenopsis × gersenii =

Species of orchid

Phalaenopsis × gersenii is a species of orchid native to Borneo and Sumatra. It is a natural hybrid of Phalaenopsis violacea and Phalaenopsis sumatrana. It is named after Gerrit Jan Gersen (1826-1877). He was a Dutch official, who was deployed to the Dutch East Indies, where he also was active as a plant collector of the Malesian region.

== Taxonomy ==
Phalaenopsis × singuliflora has been viewed as a synonym of Phalaenopsis × gersenii. The other natural hybrid however involves Phalaenopsis bellina instead of Phalaenopsis violacea.
