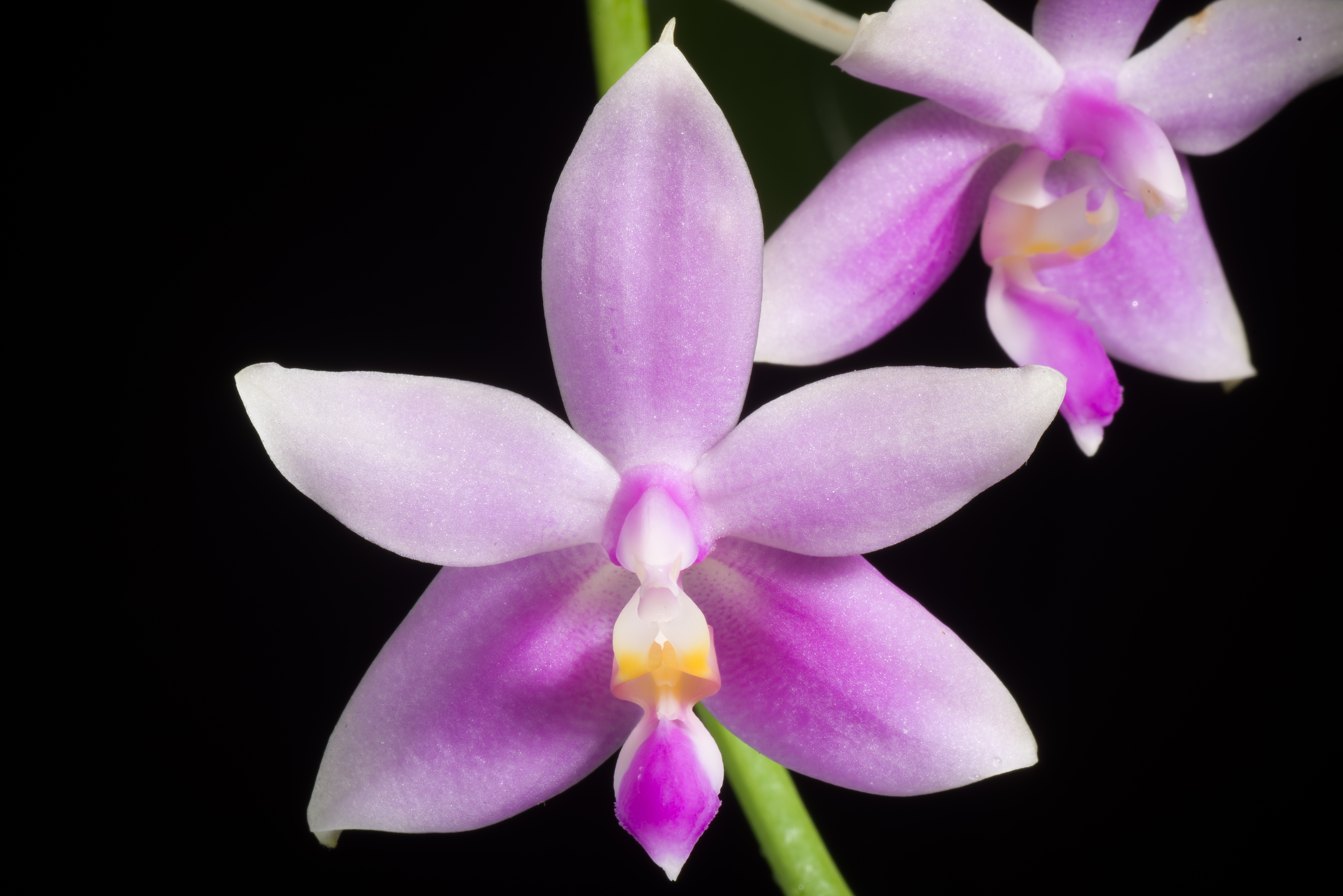
- flower detail

Scientific classification
- Kingdom: Plantae
- Clade: Tracheophytes
- Clade: Angiosperms
- Clade: Monocots
- Order: Asparagales
- Family: Orchidaceae
- Subfamily: Epidendroideae
- Genus: Phalaenopsis
- Species: P. mentawaiensis

Binomial name
- Phalaenopsis mentawaiensis O.Gruss
- distribution of Phalaenopsis mentawaiensis

Synonyms
- Phalaenopsis violacea var. mentawei

= Phalaenopsis mentawaiensis =

Species of epiphytic orchid

Phalaenopsis mentawaiensis is a species of orchid endemic to Sumatra, Indonesia. The specific epithet mentawaiensis refers to the Mentawai islands of West Sumatra.

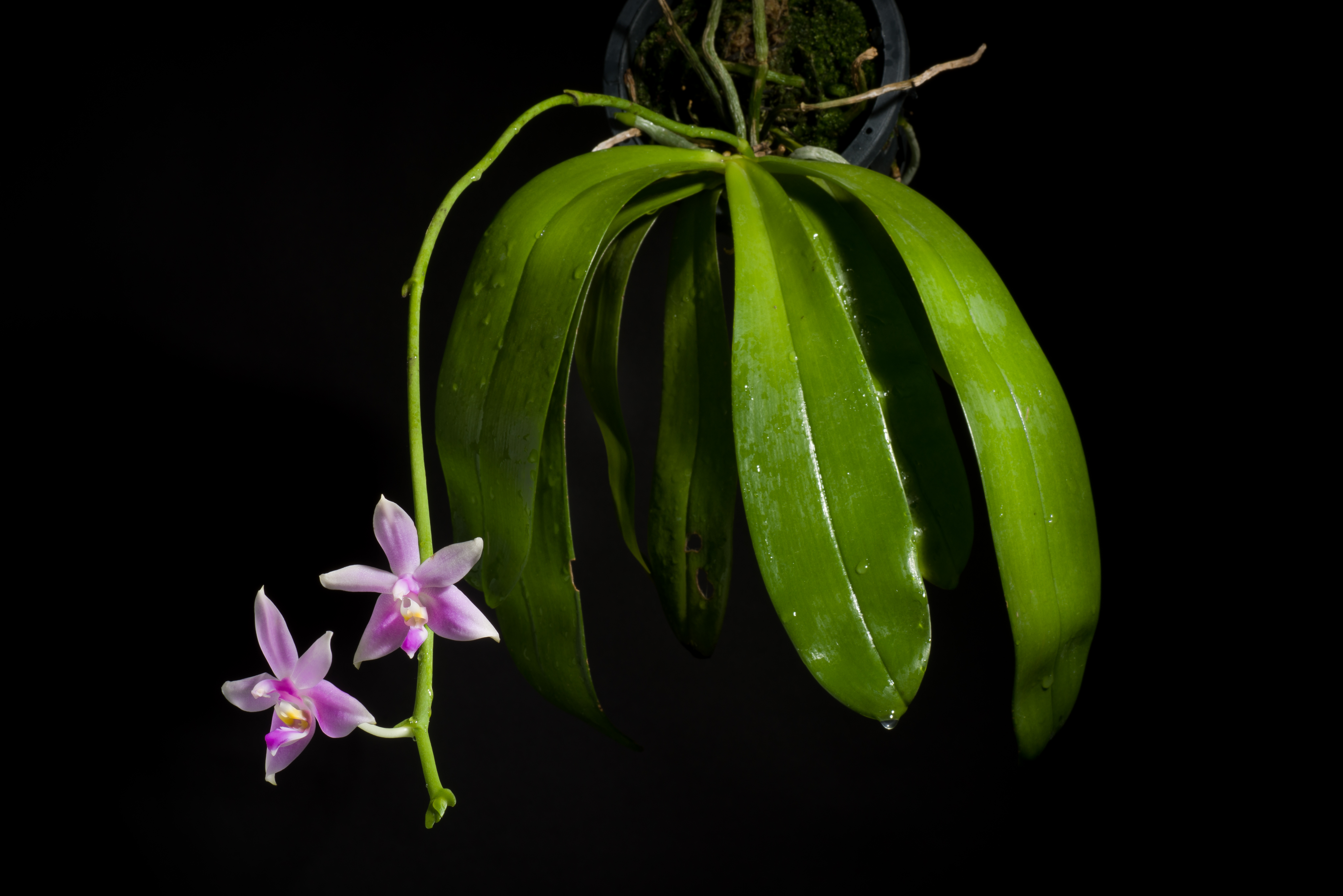
Entire plant exhibiting a pendent habitus and a long inflorescence.

== Description ==
This species is a small-sized, hot-growing epiphyte with 15–50 cm long, inclined to erect, branched or unbranched inflorescences. They produce slightly fragrant flowers of similar floral fragrance to Phalaenopsis violacea. The flowers are larger and more full in shape, which approach those of Phalaenopsis bellina. Some forms have green tipped sepals and petals.

== Ecology ==
This species occurs on tall trees in elevations of 0–100 m above sea level.

== Taxonomy ==
This species was formerly identified as Phalaenopsis violacea var. mentawai. It was separated from Phalaenopsis violacea in 2014 by Olaf Gruss.
The genetic evidence allows a distinction of Phalaenopsis violacea and Phalaenopsis mentawaiensis. However, it does not support a distinction of Phalaenopsis violacea and Phalaenopsis bellina. All three taxa were formerly included in Phalaenopsis violacea sensu lato.

== Conservation ==
International trade is regulated through the CITES appendix II regulations of international trade.
