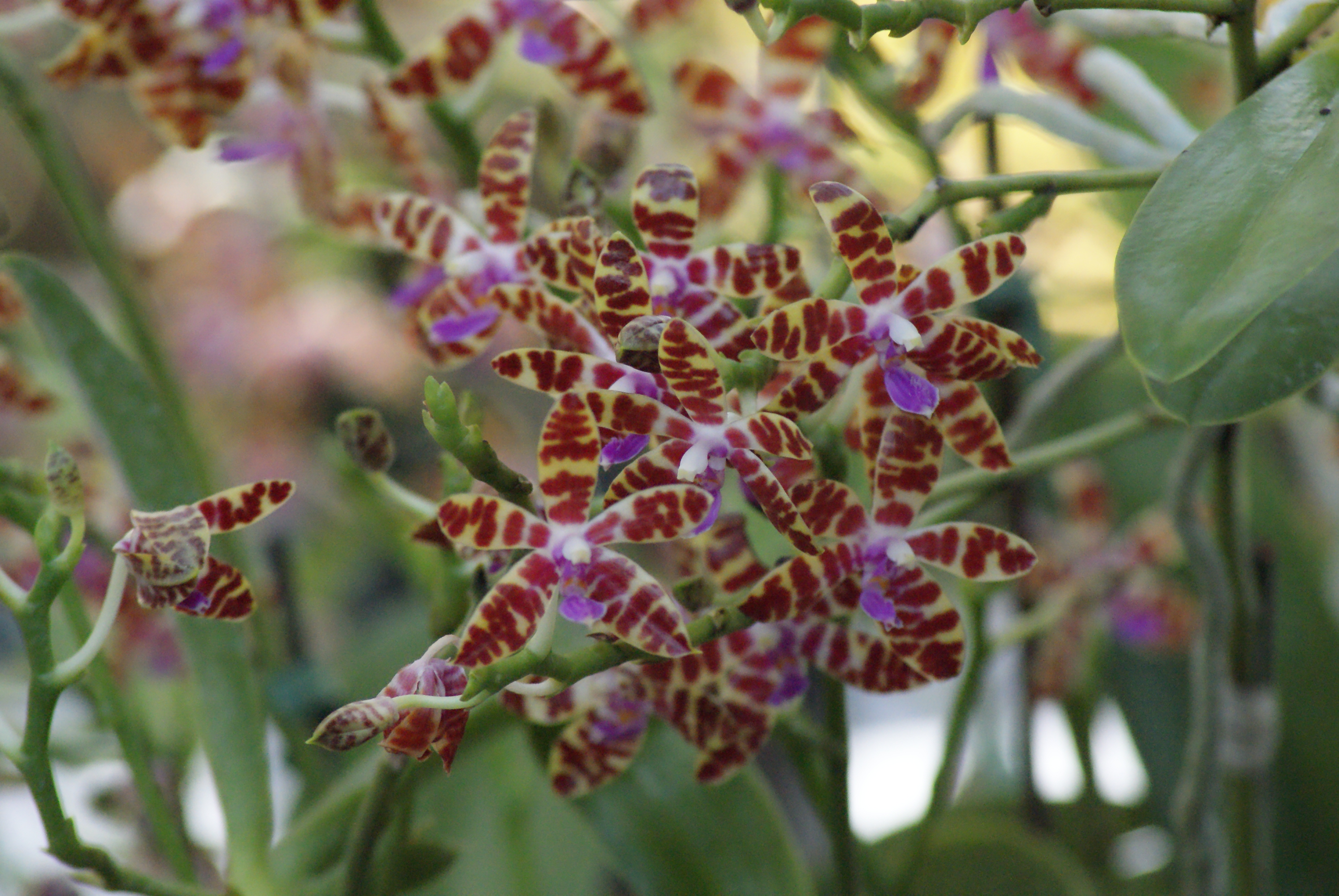

Scientific classification
- Kingdom: Plantae
- Clade: Tracheophytes
- Clade: Angiosperms
- Clade: Monocots
- Order: Asparagales
- Family: Orchidaceae
- Subfamily: Epidendroideae
- Genus: Phalaenopsis
- Species: P. bastianii

Binomial name
- Phalaenopsis bastianii (Rchb. f.) Shim 1982

Synonyms
- Phalaenopsis deltonii Hort. ex Gruss & Rolke 1991; Phalaenopsis bastianii forma flava Gruss & Rolke 1991

= Phalaenopsis bastianii =

Species of orchid

Phalaenopsis bastianii is a species of orchid endemic to the Philippines. Similar in form to a miniature Phalaenopsis lueddemanniana, the colour of the flower is similar to that of Phalaenopsis mariae.
