= Phalaenopsis × singuliflora =

Scientific classification
- Kingdom: Plantae
- Clade: Tracheophytes
- Clade: Angiosperms
- Clade: Monocots
- Order: Asparagales
- Family: Orchidaceae
- Subfamily: Epidendroideae
- Genus: Phalaenopsis
- Species: P. × valentinii

Binomial name
- Phalaenopsis × valentinii Rchb.f.
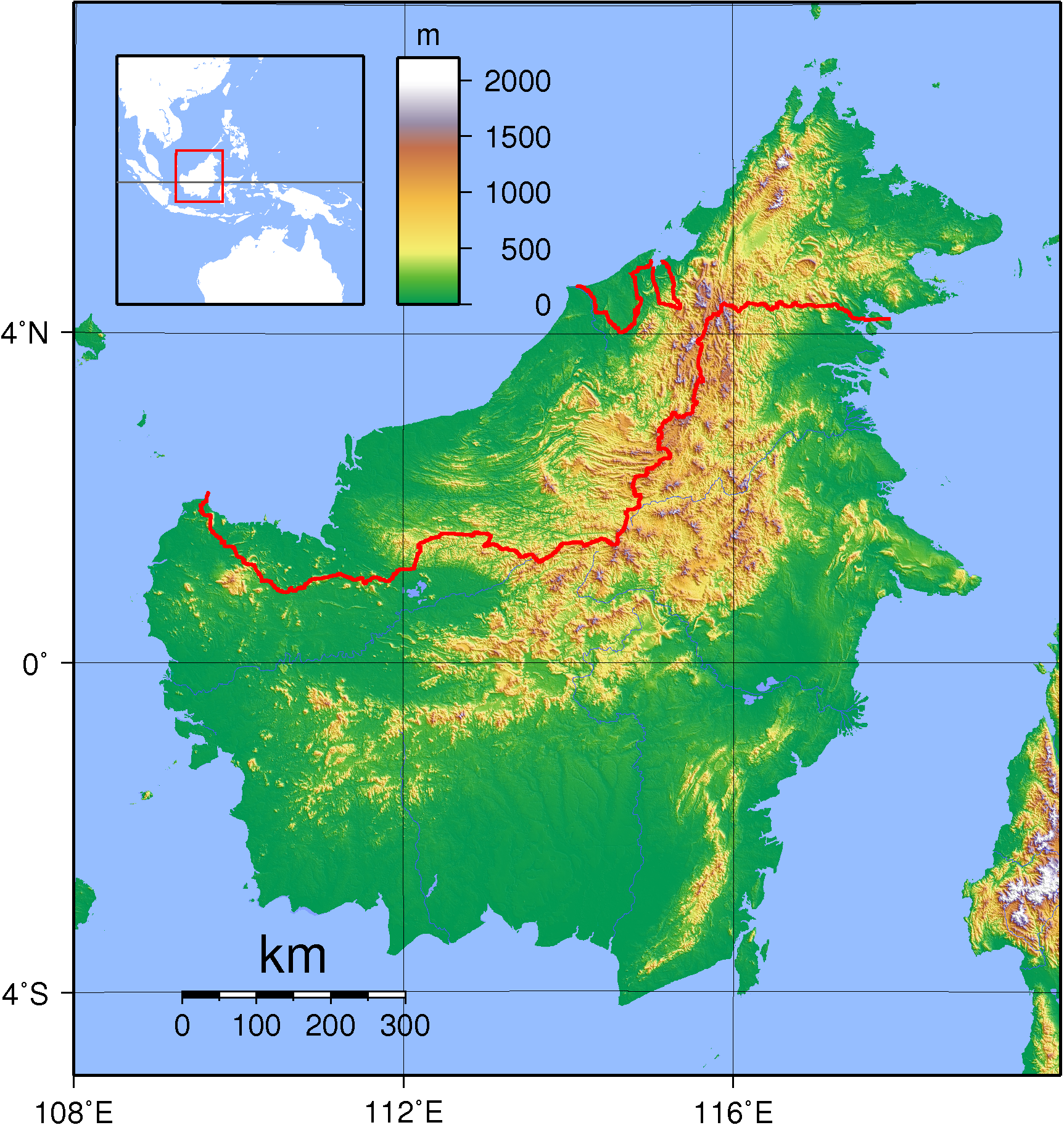
- Distribution of Phalaenopsis × singuliflora

Species of orchid

Phalaenopsis × singuliflora is a species of orchid native to Borneo. It is a natural hybrid of Phalaenopsis bellina and Phalaenopsis sumatrana. Its name singuliflora is derived from the consecutively produced flowers.

== Taxonomy ==
It has been viewed as a synonym of Phalaenopsis × gersenii. This natural hybrid however involves Phalaenopsis violacea and Phalaenopsis sumatrana.
