= Hexapora =

Conservation status
- Endangered (IUCN 3.1)

Scientific classification
- Kingdom: Plantae
- Clade: Embryophytes
- Clade: Tracheophytes
- Clade: Angiosperms
- Clade: Magnoliids
- Order: Laurales
- Family: Lauraceae
- Genus: Hexapora; Hook.f.
- Species: H. curtisii

Binomial name
- Hexapora curtisii Hook.f.

Synonyms
- Genus: Micropora Hook.f.; Species: Micropora curtisii (Hook.f.) Hook.f.

Genus and species of plant

Hexapora is a monotypic genus in the family Lauraceae. It has the single species Hexapora curtisii. The genus is named for the anther pores of the tree's six stamens. The species is named for the English botanist Charles Curtis, who collected samples of the species for Joseph Dalton Hooker.

== Description ==
Hexapora curtisii grows as a tree up to 18 metres (60 ft) tall, with a trunk diameter of up to 40 cm (16 in). The leathery leaves are elliptical and measure up to 18 cm (7 in) long. Its inflorescences feature small yellow flowers, which bloom from March to December.

== Distribution and habitat ==
Hexapora curtisii is endemic to Peninsular Malaysia, where it is confined to Penang Island. Its habitat is open forest, at altitudes of 240–830 m (800–2,700 ft).

== Conservation ==
Hexapora curtisii was assessed in 1998 as Critically Endangered on the IUCN Red List. While a 2015 search did not locate the species, its forest habitat is intact and protected.
