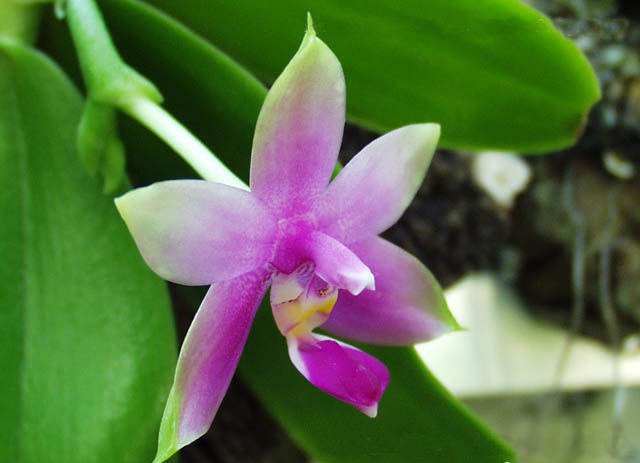
- Flower of Phalaenopsis violacea

Conservation status
- Vulnerable (IUCN 3.1)

Scientific classification
- Kingdom: Plantae
- Clade: Tracheophytes
- Clade: Angiosperms
- Clade: Monocots
- Order: Asparagales
- Family: Orchidaceae
- Subfamily: Epidendroideae
- Genus: Phalaenopsis
- Species: P. violacea

Binomial name
- Phalaenopsis violacea H.Witte

Synonyms
- Stauritis violacea (H.Witte) Rchb.f.; Stauropsis violacea (H.Witte) Rchb.f.; Polychilos violacea (H.Witte) Shim; Phalaenopsis violacea f. alba (Teijsm. & Binn.) Christenson; Phalaenopsis violacea f. coerulea Christenson

= Phalaenopsis violacea =

Species of orchid

Phalaenopsis violacea is a species of orchid endemic to the Andaman Islands, the Nicobar Islands and northwestern Sumatra.

== Description ==
Phalaenopsis violacea is a species of orchid belonging to the genus Phalaenopsis.The plant has a compact habit, with medium size, wide green leaves. The individual flower of this plant is small (3.5 cm wide), fragrant and mostly violet. Some varieties of this plant have some green colour on the tepal edges.

The plant was discovered in 1859 by Johannes Teijsmann, who sent it to the botanic garden at Leiden, Netherlands, Hortus Botanicus Leiden. It was then flowered by H. Witte. In that same year the banker Jan Abraham Willink W.Z.N. a dedicated amateur of orchids in Amsterdam, also received some plants of the species and sent some of the flowering material to Heinrich Gustav Reichenbach who described it in 1862 under the name Stauritis violacea. In the same year Teijsmann and Binnedijk in Bogor, Java, also described their plant. as Phalaenopsis violacea.

Since the 20th century the species has been a parent in numerous Phalaenopsis hybrids in commerce.

== Taxonomy ==
This species is closely related to Phalaenopsis bellina and Phalaenopsis mentawaiensis, which were formerly included within Phalaenopsis violacea sensu lato. From the former broadly defined Phalaenopsis violacea the separation of Phalaenopsis bellina was published in 1995, followed by the more recent separation of Phalaenopsis mentawaiensis in 2014.

=== Natural hybrids ===
It is one of the parent species of the natural hybrid Phalaenopsis × gersenii.

== Cultivation ==
Phalaenopsis violacea is one of the parents of Phalaenopsis Harriettiae, reportedly the first man-made Phalaenopsis hybrid, created by John Veitch and recorded in 1887.
