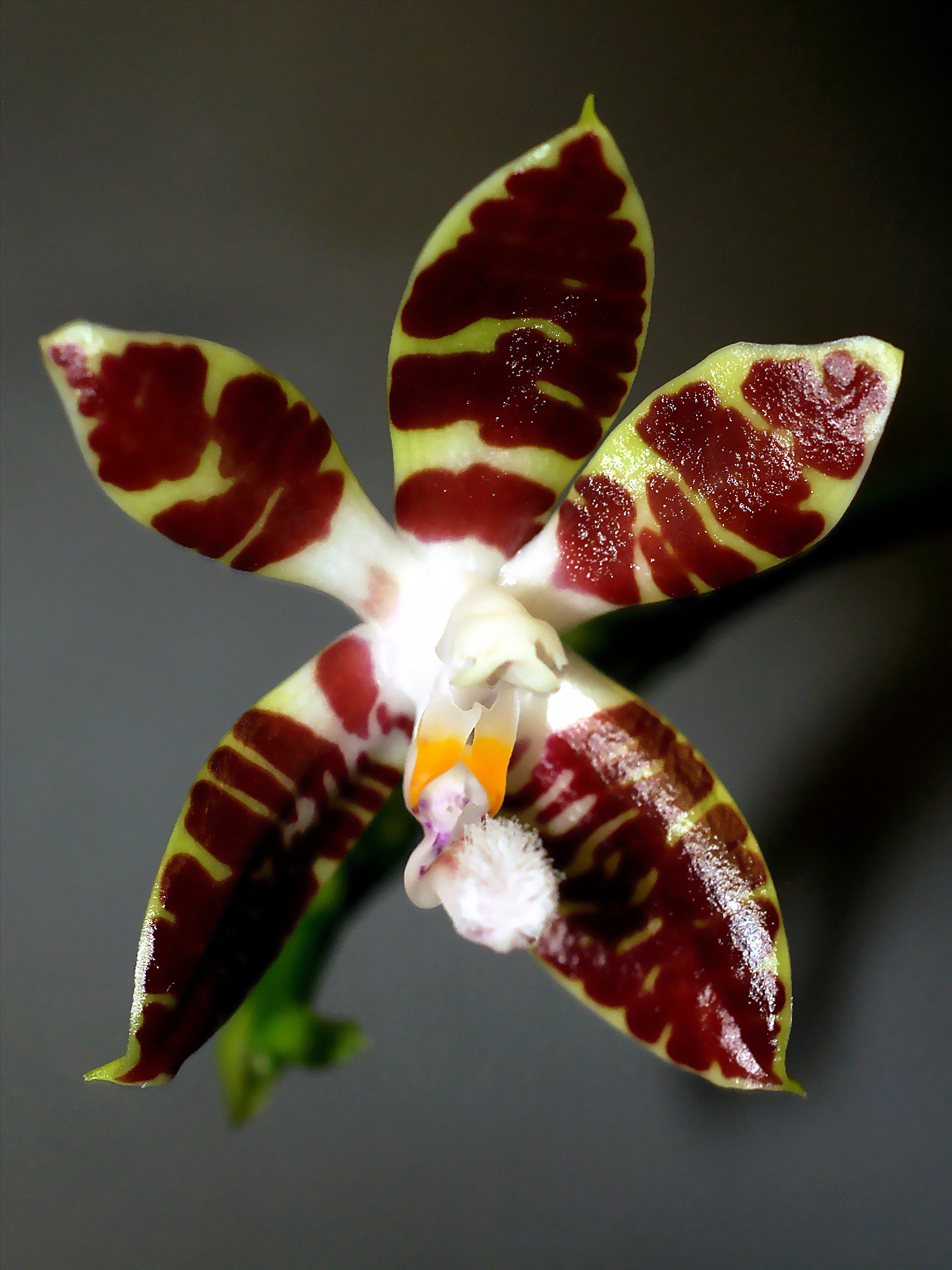

Scientific classification
- Kingdom: Plantae
- Clade: Tracheophytes
- Clade: Angiosperms
- Clade: Monocots
- Order: Asparagales
- Family: Orchidaceae
- Subfamily: Epidendroideae
- Genus: Phalaenopsis
- Species: P. sumatrana

Binomial name
- Phalaenopsis sumatrana Korth. & Rchb.f.

Synonyms
- Phalaenopsis acutifolia Linden; Phalaenopsis paucivittata (Rchb.f.) Fowlie; Phalaenopsis sumatrana var. paucivittata Rchb.f.; Phalaenopsis sumatrana f. paucivittata (Rchb.f.) O.Gruss & M.Wolff; Phalaenopsis zebrina Witte; Polychilos sumatrana (Korth. & Rchb.f.) Shim

= Phalaenopsis sumatrana =

Species of orchid

Phalaenopsis sumatrana is a species of orchid native to peninsular Thailand, Vietnam and southern Sumatra.

== Description ==
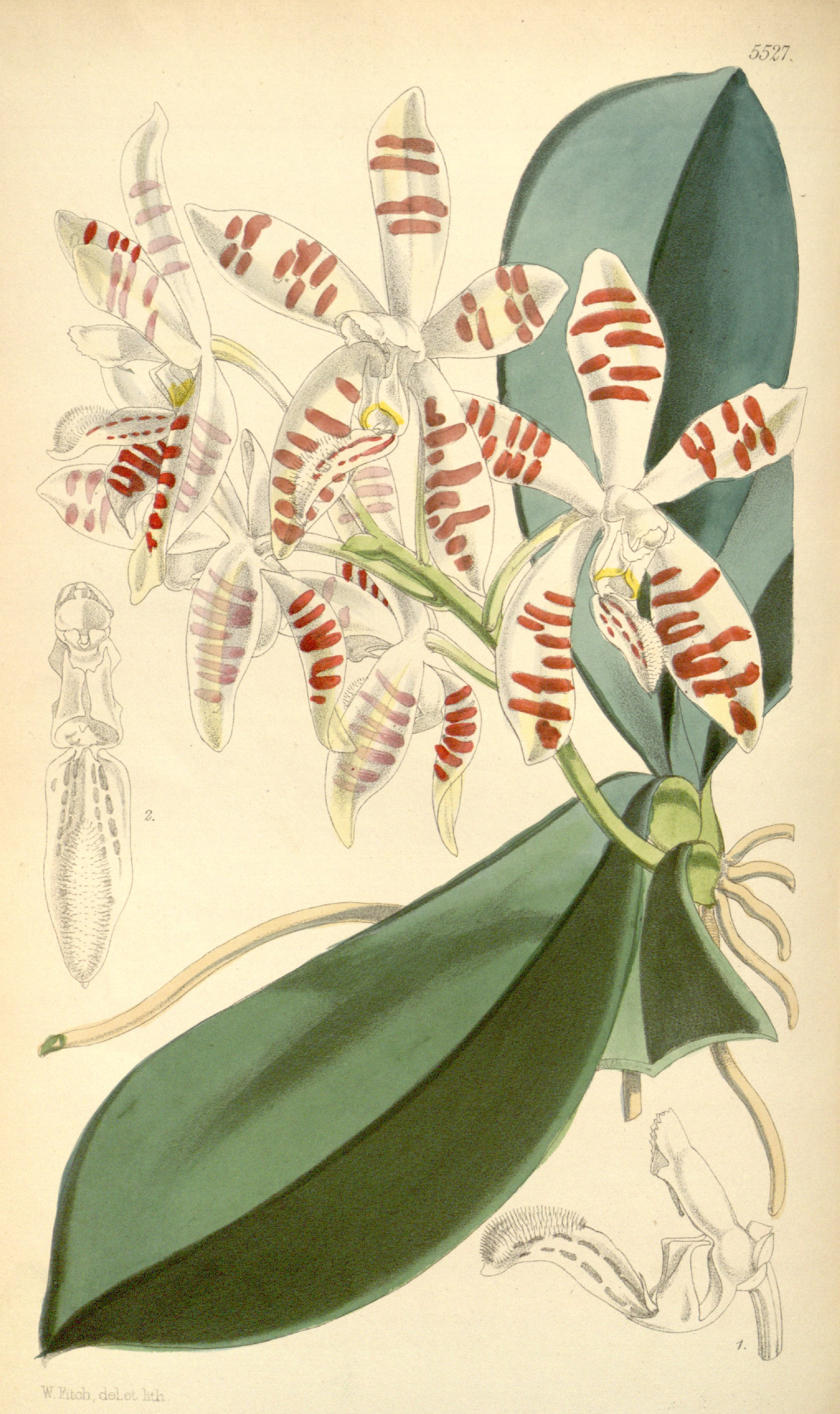
Illustration of Phalaenopsis sumatrana from Curtis's Botanical Magazine, vol. 91, 1865

Phalaenopsis sumatrana is a medium-sized, monopodial, epiphytic orchid. It has a short stem, usually singular, covered with large overlapping oval leaves. The flowers are mildly fragrant, with waxy or fleshy petals and sepals, and of somewhat variable color. They appear in the spring through fall, borne on stems (inflorescences) about 12" long, with bracts spaced along their length. From each of the bracts sprouts a single flower, with the multiple flowers lined up along the end of the inflorescence.

== Taxonomy ==
It is one of the parent species of the natural hybrids Phalaenopsis × singuliflora and Phalaenopsis × gersenii.

== Habitat ==
This species is found in lowland forests at elevations of 600 to 700 meters.
