= James Veitch Jr. =

English horticulturist

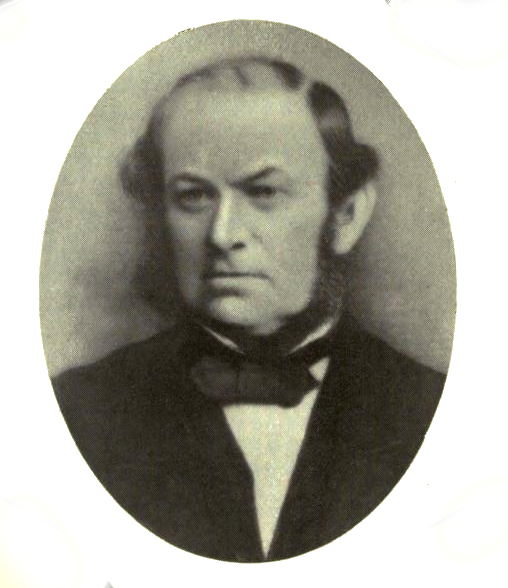

James Veitch (24 May 1815 – September 1869) was the third in a long line of horticulturists who established the family business Veitch Nurseries.

Veitch was the son of James Veitch and grandson of John Veitch. After working with his father and grandfather at the Killerton estate, James junior was sent to London to train with nurserymen there for two years. On his return to Devon, James junior used his new-found skills to help his father improve and expand the Exeter nursery, and in recognition of his contribution, he was made a partner in the nursery in 1838.

In 1838 James Jnr married a farmer's daughter from Poltimore called Harriott Gould. The family had by now moved into their specially-commissioned villa, Gras Lawn, close to the Mount Radford nursery. The multi-stemmed Sequoiadendron which graced the front garden of the Veitch residence can still be seen today as it towers above a new development off Barrack Road, Exeter.

James junior soon realised that Veitch & Sons, being based in Devon, could not compete effectively with the large London nurseries, and in 1853 he acquired the Royal Exotic Nursery business of Knight and Perry on the Kings Road in Chelsea, London.

James junior was an industrious and astute businessman, a skilled horticulturist, and from 1856 to 1864, an active member of the Council of the Royal Horticultural Society. Among other contributions, he instigated the formation of the RHS Fruit and Floral Committees; and the Veitch Memorial Medal was founded in his honour. Under his guidance, the Royal Exotic Nursery became the largest of its kind in Europe, due mostly to his division of the nursery into 11 sections: orchid, fern, new plant, decorative, tropical, soft-wooded, hard-wooded, vine, propagating, seed and glass. Each produced a vast range of the highest quality plants and was overseen by a skilled foreman. As business expanded, the nursery acquired sites at Feltham, Langley and Coombe Wood.

Eventually it became unfeasible to run both businesses side by side and in 1863 Exeter and London became independent. In Exeter, James senior was succeeded by his younger son, Robert (1823–1885), and this branch became Robert Veitch & Sons. The London branch took the name James Veitch & Sons and here James junior was succeeded by his sons John Gould (1839–1870), Harry James (1840–1924), and Arthur (1844–1880).
