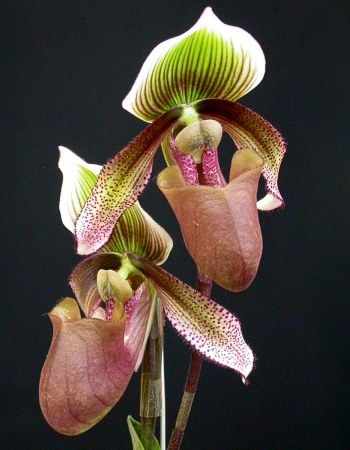
- Flower of Paphiopedilum superbiens

Scientific classification
- Kingdom: Plantae
- Clade: Tracheophytes
- Clade: Angiosperms
- Clade: Monocots
- Order: Asparagales
- Family: Orchidaceae
- Subfamily: Cypripedioideae
- Genus: Paphiopedilum
- Species: P. superbiens

Binomial name
- Paphiopedilum superbiens (Rchb.f.) Stein

Synonyms
- Cypripedium superbiens Rchb.f. (basionym); Cypripedium barbatum var. veitchii Van Houtte; Cypripedium veitchianum Lem.; Paphiopedilum veitchianum Lem.; Cypripedium barbatum var. superbum E.Morren; Cypripedium curtisii Rchb.f.; Paphiopedilum curtisii (Rchb.f.) Stein; Cordula curtisii (Rchb.f.) Rolfe; Cordula superbiens (Rchb.f.) Rolfe; Cypripedium curtisii var. sanderae Curtis; Paphiopedilum superbiens f. sanderae (Curtis) M.W.Wood; Paphiopedilum superbiens var. curtisii (Rchb.f.) Braem; Paphiopedilum superbiens var. sanderae (Curtis) Braem

= Paphiopedilum superbiens =

Species of orchid

Paphiopedilum superbiens is a species of orchid endemic to northern and western Sumatra.
