= Robert Veitch =

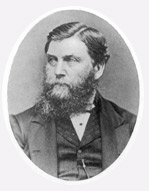
- Born: 1823
- Died: 1885 (aged 61–62)
- Occupation: Horticulturist
- Father: James Veitch (horticulturist)

Robert Toswill Veitch (1823–1885) was a member of the family of horticulturists who established the business Veitch Nurseries.

Veitch was the younger son of James Veitch and grandson of John Veitch. He spent some time farming on the Cape of Good Hope in Cape Colony, before returning to England to join the family nursery company in 1856.

In 1863, following the death of his father, he took over the Exeter branch of the family nursery business, which became Robert Veitch & Sons. Robert moved the nursery to New North Road in 1864, and opened another seed warehouse in the High Street. He was joined in 1880 by his son, Peter, who had travelled extensively in his youth. Peter brought his experiences of French and German nurseries into the company as well as an element of flair from the Chelsea, London nursery.

Robert landscaped many Exeter parks as well as the Higher Cemetery. He died in 1885 and is buried in the old St Leonards cemetery, which is an annexe of the Higher Cemetery.

Following Robert's death in 1885, his son Peter became head of the Exeter branch of the business.
