= James Veitch (horticulturist) =

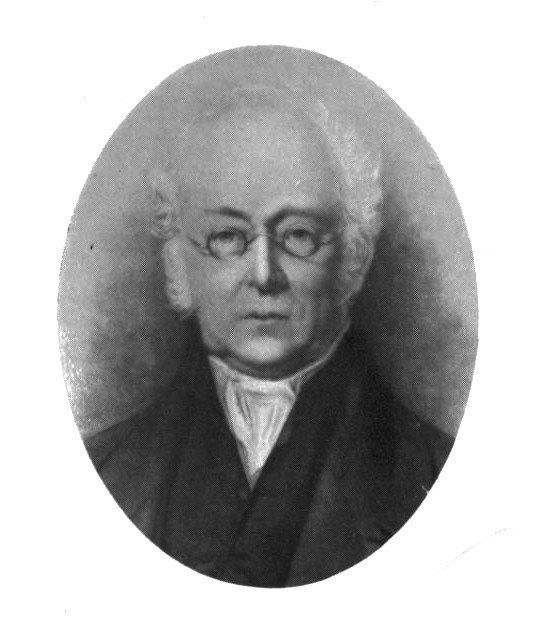

James Veitch (25 January 1792 – May 1863) was the second in a long line of horticulturists who established the family business Veitch Nurseries.

Veitch was the youngest son of John Veitch and his wife, Anna Davidson. James was a natural gardener and he helped his father on the Killerton estate from a very early age. When Sir Thomas Dyke Acland, 10th Baronet resurrected the landscaping projects at Killerton, James introduced many of his own ideas and working methods, and some of the mature Spanish chestnuts and beech trees on the estate are a testament to this work.

The Budlake nursery continued to flourish, and in 1832 with James now at the helm, the nursery was expanded with the purchase of 25 acres (100,000 m^{2}) of land at Mount Radford on the Topsham Road, Exeter. This was followed by the first of a number of shops or seed warehouses in the city centre area, with the first at 54 High Street and the last at the site of the Well House Inn in Cathedral Yard.

By 1837 James Junior, the eldest of six children, had begun working at the nursery following training at several London-based nurseries. The family had by now moved into their specially-commissioned villa, Gras Lawn, close to the Mount Radford nursery. The multi-stemmed Sequoiadendron giganteum which graced the front garden of the Veitch residence can still be seen today as it towers above a new development off Barrack Road.

In 1839 James Veitch Snr extended the nurseries still further by renting 30 acres (120,000 m^{2}) of land at Poltimore known as the "Bramberries". This site was predominantly an overspill for Haldon and Brockhill (near Broadclyst Heath).

By now, James Junior had established the family business in Kings Road, Chelsea. In Exeter, James senior was succeeded by his younger son, Robert, and this branch became Robert Veitch & Sons.

The two nurseries operated together for ten years until the death of James Snr in May 1863.
