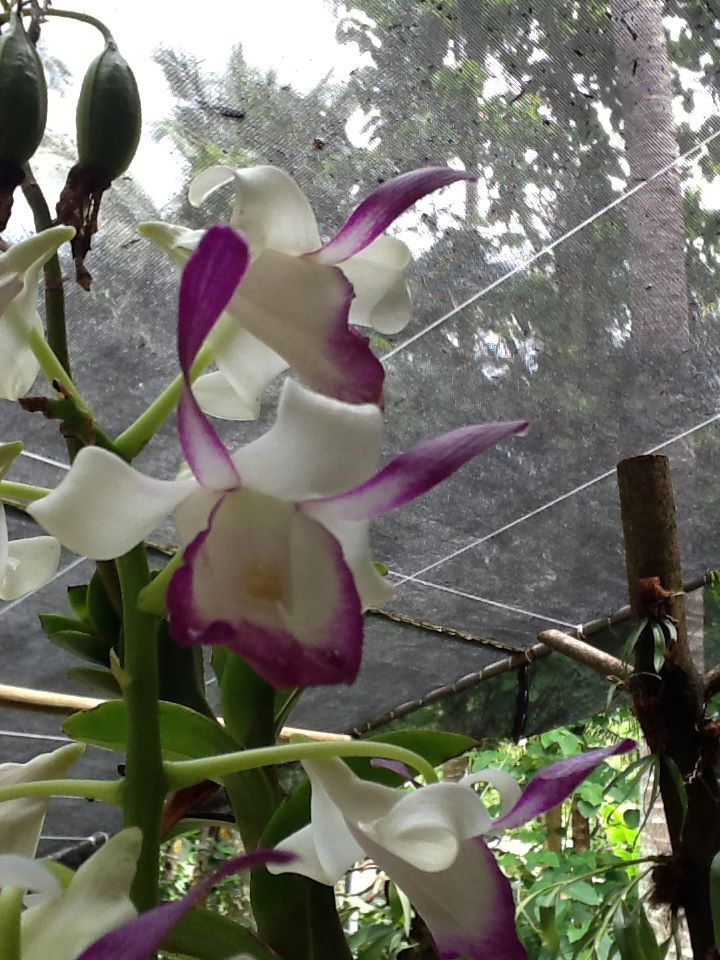

Scientific classification
- Kingdom: Plantae
- Clade: Tracheophytes
- Clade: Angiosperms
- Clade: Monocots
- Order: Asparagales
- Family: Orchidaceae
- Subfamily: Epidendroideae
- Genus: Dendrobium
- Species: D. taurinum

Binomial name
- Dendrobium taurinum Lindl.

Synonyms
- Callista taurina (Lindl.) Kuntze; Durabaculum taurinum (Lindl.) M.A.Clem. & D.L.Jones

= Dendrobium taurinum =

Bull orchid

Species of orchid

Dendrobium taurinum, the bull orchid, is a species of flowering plant in the family Orchidaceae. It is found in the Philippines and in the Indonesian Province of Maluku. The size of the flower ranges from 5 to 6.5 cm.
