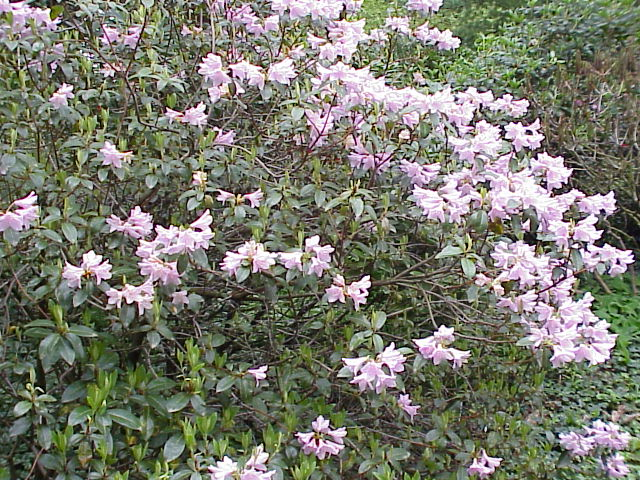

Scientific classification
- Kingdom: Plantae
- Clade: Tracheophytes
- Clade: Angiosperms
- Clade: Eudicots
- Clade: Asterids
- Order: Ericales
- Family: Ericaceae
- Genus: Rhododendron
- Species: R. yunnanense

Binomial name
- Rhododendron yunnanense Franch.

Synonyms
- Rhododendron aechmophyllum Balf. f. & Forrest; Rhododendron bodinieri Franch.; Rhododendron chartophyllum Franch.; Rhododendron chartophyllum f. praecox Diels; Rhododendron hormophorum Balf. f. & Forrest; Rhododendron pleistanthum Balf. f. ex Hutch.; Rhododendron seguinii H. Lév.; Rhododendron shaanxiense W.P. Fang & Z.J. Zhao; Rhododendron suberosum Balf. f. & Forrest

= Rhododendron yunnanense =

Species of flowering bush

Rhododendron yunnanense (云南杜鹃) is a species of rhododendron native to Myanmar and Guizhou, Shaanxi, Sichuan, Xizang, and Yunnan, China, where it grows at altitudes of 2200–3600 meters. It is a shrub that grows to 1–2 m in height, with leaves that are oblong, lanceolate, oblong-lanceolate or obovate, 2.5–7 by 0.8–3m in size. Flowers are white, pale red, or pale purple.

In cultivation in the UK the cultivar 'Openwood' has gained the Royal Horticultural Society's Award of Garden Merit. The flowers are a pale lavender with a crimson spotted throat.
