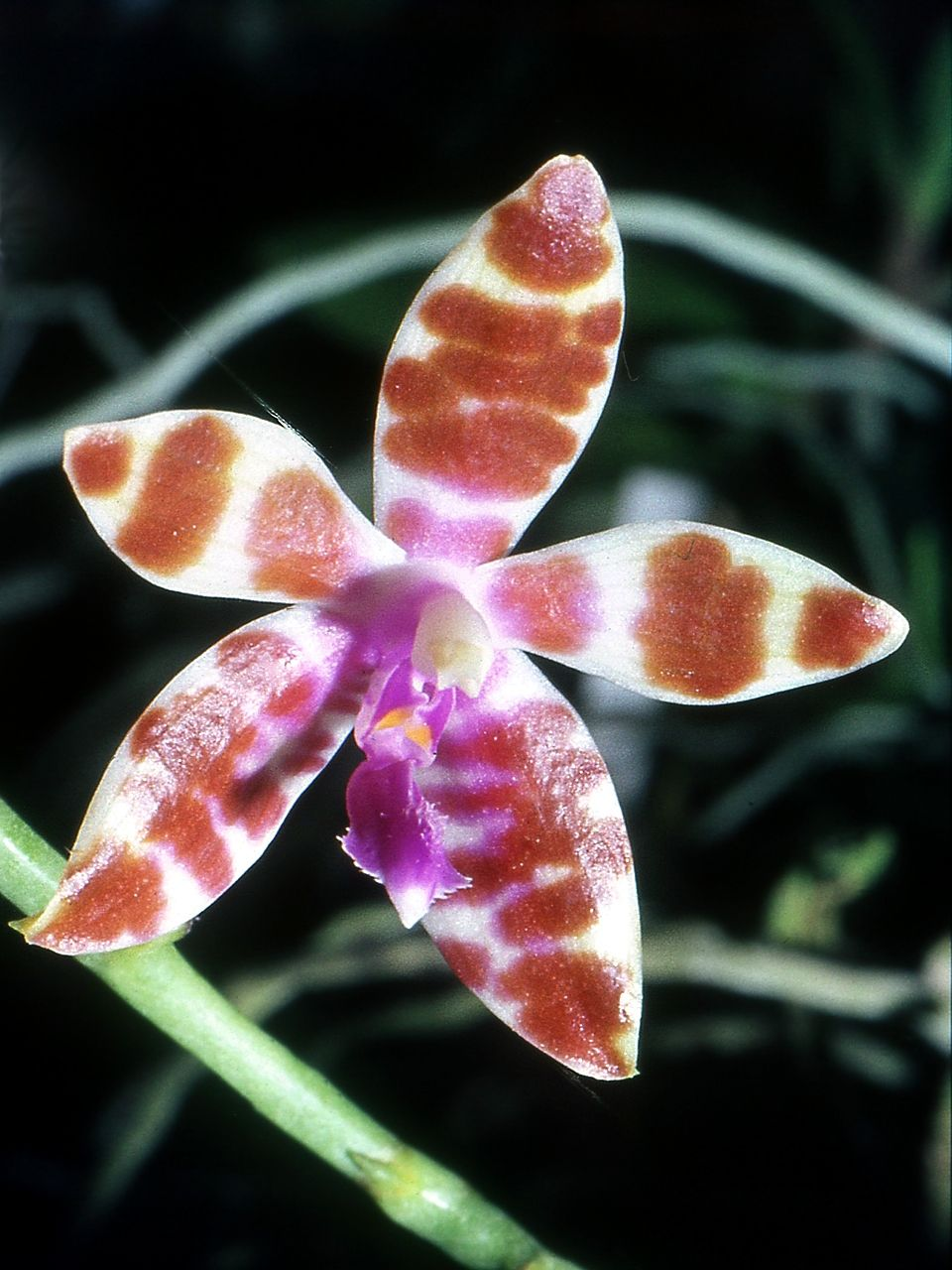
- Flower of Phalaenopsis mariae

Scientific classification
- Kingdom: Plantae
- Clade: Tracheophytes
- Clade: Angiosperms
- Clade: Monocots
- Order: Asparagales
- Family: Orchidaceae
- Subfamily: Epidendroideae
- Genus: Phalaenopsis
- Species: P. mariae

Binomial name
- Phalaenopsis mariae Burbridge ex R.Warner & H.Williams

Synonyms
- Polychilos mariae (Burbridge ex R.Warner & H.Williams) Shim

= Phalaenopsis mariae =

Species of orchid

Phalaenopsis mariae is a species of orchid found from Sabah, Borneo to the Mindanao island, Philippines.
