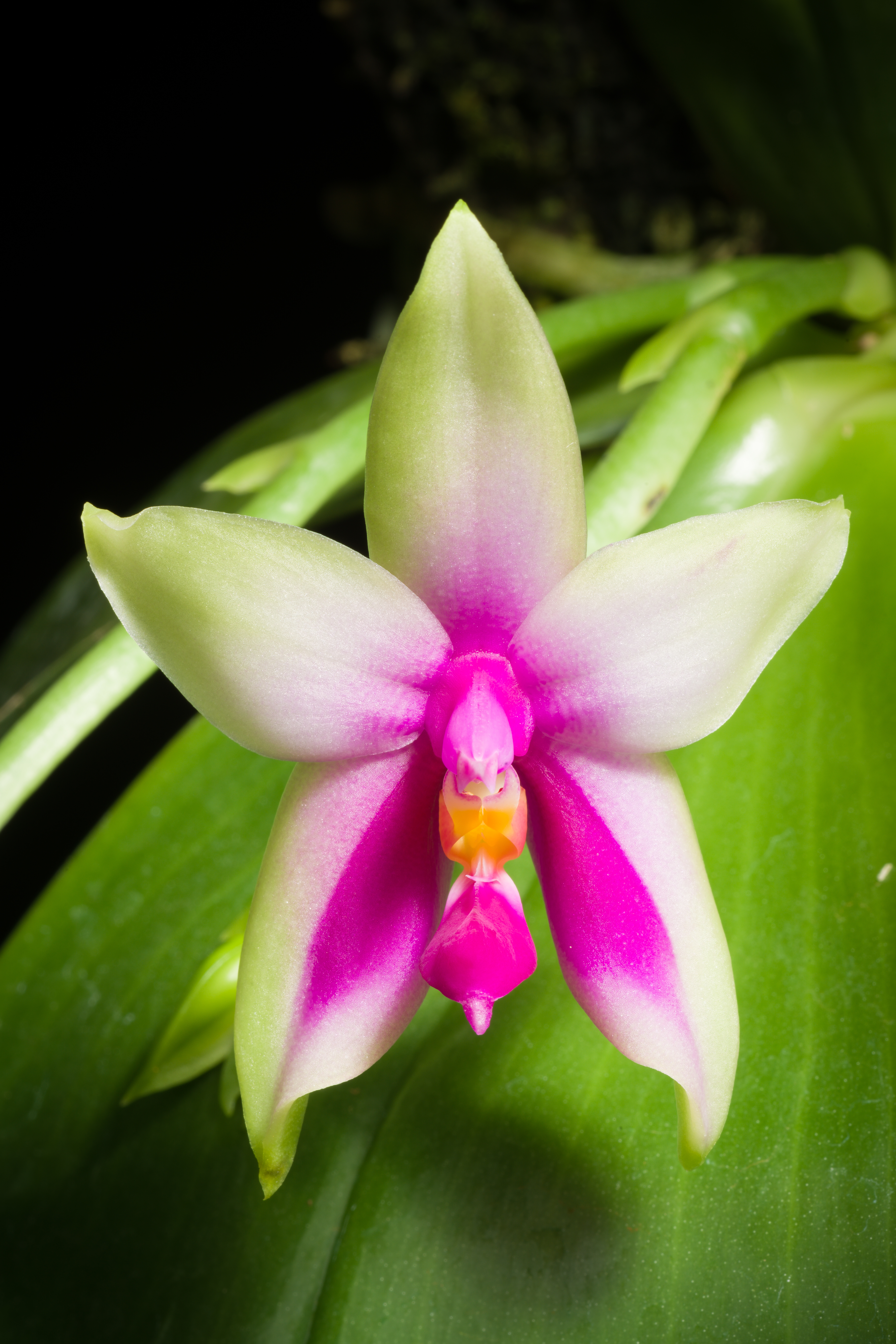
- Flower of Phalaenopsis bellina

Scientific classification
- Kingdom: Plantae
- Clade: Tracheophytes
- Clade: Angiosperms
- Clade: Monocots
- Order: Asparagales
- Family: Orchidaceae
- Subfamily: Epidendroideae
- Genus: Phalaenopsis
- Species: P. bellina

Binomial name
- Phalaenopsis bellina (Rchb.f.) Christenson

Synonyms
- Phalaenopsis violacea var. bellina Rchb.f. (basionym); Phalaenopsis violacea var. murtoniana Rchb.f.; Phalaenopsis violacea var. bowringiana Rchb.f.; Phalaenopsis violacea var. punctata Rchb.f.; Phalaenopsis violacea var. borneo Rchb.f.; Phalaenopsis bellina f. bowringiana (Rchb.f.) Christenson; Phalaenopsis bellina f. murtoniana (Rchb.f.) Christenson; Phalaenopsis bellina f. punctata (Rchb.f.) Christenson; Phalaenopsis bellina f. alba Christenson

= Phalaenopsis bellina =

Species of orchid

Phalaenopsis bellina is an orchid endemic to Borneo. It is one of 75 species of Phalaenopsis and one of the most commonly cultivated species in the genus.

== Distribution ==
Phalaenopsis bellina is found in parts of Borneo, growing in the canopy of trees where they receive abundant sunlight, and experience pronounced wet and dry cycles.

== Taxonomy ==
Phalaenopsis comes from the Greek word phalaina, which means "moth", and the Latin word bella, which means "beautiful". Phalaenopsis bellina was originally called P. violacea var. Borneo, however it has since been moved into its own species due to differences in habitat and plant morphology. The varieties include coerulea, rubra, alba, and murtoniana. The coerulea form has bluish-violet pigment as opposed to the typically magenta coloring of the nominate type. The rubra form is solid magenta, however it is believed to be a hybrid between P. bellina and its sister species P. violacea. The alba form lacks all pigment, and the flowers thus appear white, and sometimes faintly green. The murtoniana form has a yellow-orange flower base, overlaid with random reddish blotches.

=== Natural hybrids ===
It is one of the parent species of the natural hybrid Phalaenopsis × singuliflora.

== Description ==
=== Flowers ===
Star shaped, 5–6 cm in size, deeply saturated fuchsia or violet near the base of sepals and petals. Interior half of the lower sepals typically display more coloration than other sepals and petals.

=== Inflorescence ===
Inflorescences emerge from the leaf axils arranged alternately on the main stem. Oftentimes during development they puncture the epidermis at the base of the leaves. A single inflorescence typically carries only 2 or 3 flowers at a time, however more has been observed. Flowers may emerge from the tip of the inflorescence from spring through summer, and continue to do so for many years until the stem dries up.

=== Leaves ===
Phalaenopsis bellina has thick, succulent leaves. They are oval, light to medium green, and sometimes wavy. When mounted, leaves grow so that older, lower leaves are shifted towards the sides while new growth points downwards, in order to expose as much surface area to sunlight. Potted plants do not display this growth habit, so it is often recommended that plants be grown mounted to best expose leaves to light.

=== Roots ===
Phalaenopsis bellina has a fibrous root system, with roots usually emerging near the base of the stem. The root is composed of a spongy outer layer called the velamen, which is responsible for protecting underlying cells from UV rays and physical damage, as well as absorbing water. New growth emerges from the root tips, and is usually a light green color until the velamen matures and turns older roots grayish-green. Roots are thick and are capable of holding water for extended periods of drought. Dense root hairs emerge from the velamen and root tips to anchor plants to host trees or mounts.

== Hybridization ==
Phalaenopsis bellina is commonly used in Phalaenopsis hybridization, and is the parent of 30 or more primary hybrids as well as hundreds of complex hybrids. Its desirable traits include its wide petals, fragrance, and deep saturated color.

== Cultivation ==
Phalaenopsis bellina prefers bright, filtered light, warm temperatures, and good air circulation. It is essential that potting/mounting media approaches dryness between waterings to avoid root rot. Distilled, reverse osmosis, or rain water is recommended if municipal water is hard or has a high TDS count, because salt buildup in the planting media can quickly desiccate and kill roots. Large plants grow quickly and should thus be fertilized regularly during the growing season to promote growth of new leaves, roots, and flowers. When plants have outgrown their pots or mounts, it is recommended to move them into the new substrate while new roots are growing so that the plant can acclimate to its new conditions. Since P. bellina is epiphytic, it prefers to have good air movement around its roots. This means using a loose, airy medium such as fir bark, tree fern fiber, synthetic media, and others.

== Pests and diseases ==
=== Diseases ===
- Bacteria soft rot: quickly spreading bacterial rot that leaves infected areas watery and soft. Best method of treatment is removal of infected tissue.
- Anthracnose: a group of fungal diseases that cause leaf spots, blotches, dieback, and others. Spreads in wet conditions.
- Black rot: fungal disease that spreads quickly through plant tissue, turning it black. Spreads by splashing water between affected plants.

=== Pests ===
- Aphids: insect pest that sucks sap from plant tissue, excreting a substance called honeydew, which invites other fungal disease.
- Thrips: insect pest that sucks sap from plant tissue, can kill host plants if infestations become too severe.
- Mites: tiny arachnid pests that suck sap and remove chlorophyll from leaves, turning them silvery. They are also potential vectors for diseases.
- Mealybugs: produce large quantities of honeydew by sucking sap, which attracts ants and fungal diseases.
- Scale: common pest that spreads between plants quickly and sucks sap.
- Slugs and Snails: pest that consumes young, tender growths, especially developing root tips and flower buds.
- Whiteflies: insect pest that sucks sap, producing honeydew that attracts ants and other fungal diseases.
