= Frederick William Burbidge =

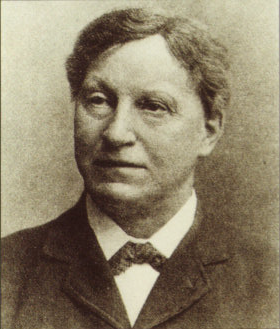
- Born: Wymeswold, Leicestershire, England
- Died: Dublin, Ireland
- Occupation(s): Explorer; plant collector
- Known for: Victorian Medal of Honour by the Royal Horticultural Society

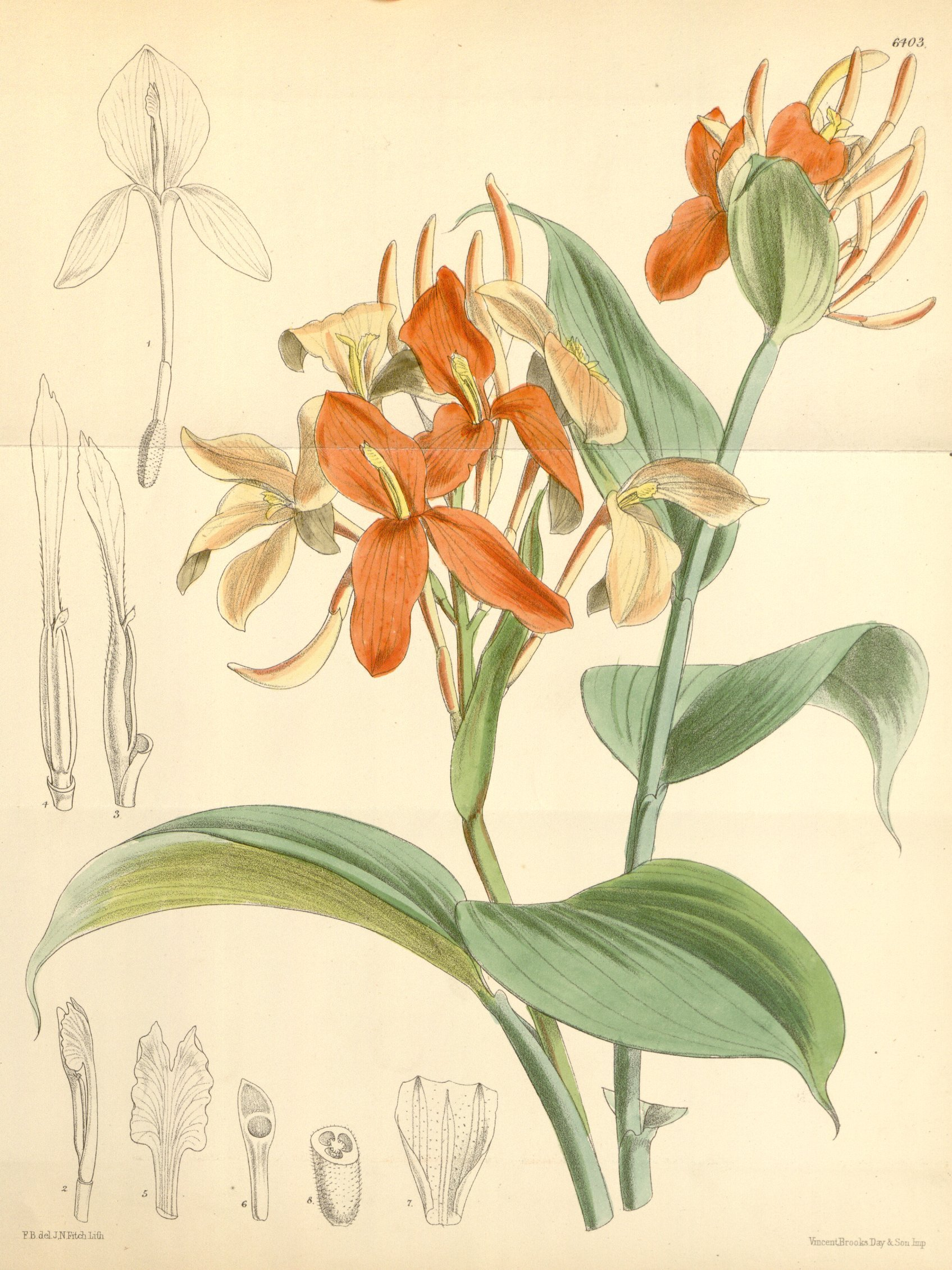
An illustration of Burbidgea nitida from Curtis's Botanical Magazine (1879). The plant was discovered by Burbidge on an expedition in Borneo.

Frederick William Thomas Burbidge (1847–1905) was a British explorer who collected many rare tropical plants for the famous Veitch Nurseries.

== Biography ==
Burbidge was born at Wymeswold, Leicestershire, on 21 March 1847, was son of Thomas Burbidge, a farmer and fruit-grower.

Burbridge entered the gardens of the Royal Horticultural Society at Chiswick as a student in 1868, and proceeded in the same year to the Royal Gardens, Kew. Here he showed skill as a draughtsman and was partly employed in making drawings of plants in the herbarium. Leaving Kew in 1870, he was on the staff of the Garden from that year until 1877.

In 1877 Burbidge was sent by Messrs. Veitch as a collector to Borneo. He was absent two years, during which he also visited Johore, Brunei, and the Sulu Islands. He brought back to Great Britain many remarkable plants, especially:

- pitcher plants, such as "Nepenthes rajah" and "N. bicalcarata";
- orchids, such as "Cypripedium laurenceanum", "Dendrobium burbidgei" and "Aerides burbidgei";
- ferns, such as "Alsophila burbidgei" and "Polypodium burbidgei".

The first set of the dried specimens brought back by Burbidge numbered nearly a thousand species, and was presented by Messrs. Veitch to the Kew Herbarium.

Sir Joseph Hooker in describing the Scitamineous "Burbidgea nitida" names it:

in recognition of Burbidge's eminent services to horticulture, whether as a collector in Borneo, or as author of Cultivated Plants, their Propagation and Improvement, a work which should be in every gardener's library.

In 1880 Burbidge was appointed curator of the botanical gardens of Trinity College, Dublin, at Glasnevin. There he did much to encourage gardening in Ireland. In 1889 Dublin University conferred on him the honorary degree of M.A., and in 1894 he became keeper of the college park as well as curator of the botanical gardens.

On the establishment of the Victoria Medal of Honour by the Royal Horticultural Society, in 1897, Burbidge was one of the first recipients, and he was also a member of the Royal Irish Academy. He died from heart-disease on Christmas Eve 1905, and was buried in Dublin.

Burbidge is commemorated in the name of the genus Burbidgea (Hook.f.) and several species including Globba burbidgei (Ridl.). Nepenthes burbidgeae (Hook.f. ex Burb.) is thought to be named after his wife.

In the opinion of Frederick Corder the author of his biography in the Dictionary of National Biography (DNB) "Although no scientific botanist, nor very skilful as a cultivator, Burbidge did admirable service as a horticultural writer".

== Family ==
Burbidge married in 1876 Mary Wade, who died, six months before him. They had no children.

== Works ==
During his period at Kew and working on the Gardener Burbidge published:

- The Art of Botanical Drawing (1872);
- Cool Orchids and how to grow them, with a Descriptive List of all the Best Species (1874);
- Domestic Floriculture, Window Gardening and Floral Decorations (1874) — Which according to Frederic Corder (1912, his biographer in the DNB) was one of the best books of the kind;
- [The Narcissus: its History and Culture (1875), with coloured plates drawn by himself and a scientific review of the genus by Mr. John Gilbert Baker;
- The volume on "Horticulture" (1877) in G. P. Bevan's British Industries series;
- Cultivated Plants, their Propagation and Improvement (1877) – which, according to Croder (1912), was an excellent textbook for young gardeners, which won public appreciation from William Gladstone.

After the 1877–79 Borneo, Johore, Brunei, and the Sulu Islands expedition, the chronicle of his journey was published:

- The Gardens of the Sun, or a Naturalist's Journal on the Mountains and in the Forests and Swamps of Borneo and the Sulu Archipelago (1880).

While at Dublin he published two books:

- The Chrysanthemum: its History, Culture, Classification and Nomenclature (1883)
- The Book of the Scented Garden (1905)
