= John Gould Veitch =

British horticulturist and traveller

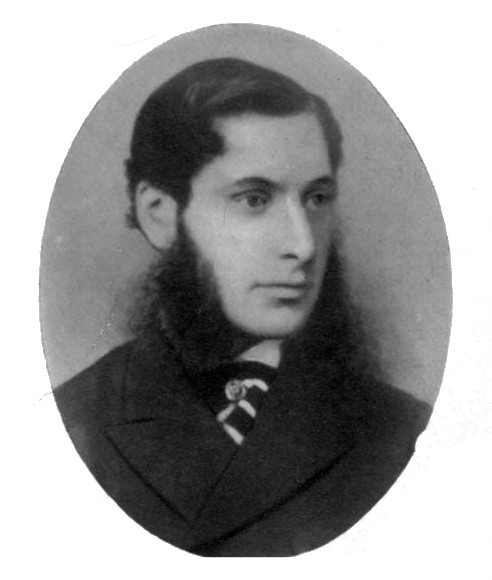

John Gould Veitch (April 1839 – 13 August 1870) was a British horticulturist and traveller, one of the first Victorian plant hunters to visit Japan. A great-grandson of John Veitch, the founder of the Veitch horticulture dynasty, he also visited the Philippines, Australia, Fiji, and other Polynesian islands.

He brought back a number of the glasshouse plants in vogue at the time, such as Acalyphas, Cordylines, Codiaeums (Crotons) and Dracaenas, and, from Fiji, a palm of a new genus later named after him, Veitchia joannis. The Veitch family name is honoured by hundreds of plant names, including the genus Veitchia. The Veitch nursery introduced 232 orchids, some 500 greenhouse plants, 118 exotic ferns, about 50 conifers, 153 deciduous trees, 72 evergreen and climbing shrubs, 122 herbaceous and 37 bulbous plants from various corners of the globe.

In Japan, he came across the eminent plant collector Robert Fortune, and their competing collections returned to England on the same ship. For example, both men claimed discovery of a species of Chamaecyparis pisifera. The Veitch Nursery on Kingston Coombe site, established a Japanese Water Garden adjacent to Warren House. Its legacy lives on today in a Veitch Heritage Garden.

He was married to Jane Hodge soon after his return to England in 1866 and fathered two sons, James Herbert Veitch (1868–1907) and John Gould Veitch Jr. (1869–1914), before dying of tuberculosis at the age of 31. He is buried in Brompton Cemetery; according to their burial registers, he died at the Coombe Wood Nursery on Kingston Hill.
