= James Herbert Veitch =

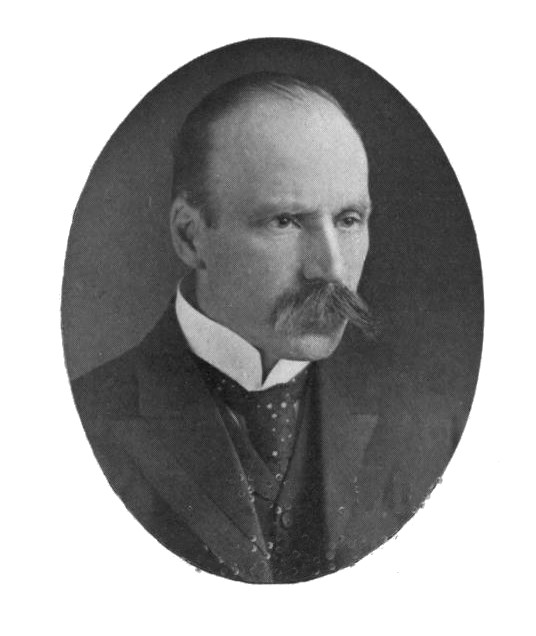

James Herbert Veitch F.L.S., F.R.H.S. (1 May 1868 – 13 November 1907), was a member of the Veitch family who were distinguished horticulturists and nursery-men for over a century.

== Early days ==
James was born at Chelsea, London, the elder son of John Gould Veitch (1839–1870) and his wife Jane Hodge. His father died of tuberculosis shortly after he was born and the family nursery based in Chelsea was afterwards managed by his uncle, Harry.

He was educated at Crawford College, Maidenhead, and in technical subjects in Germany and France, beginning work at the Chelsea, London branch of the family nursery in 1885. He was elected fellow of the Linnean Society in 1889 and was also a fellow of the Royal Horticultural Society.

== Plant collecting ==
In October 1891 he embarked on a tour of inspection of the great Botanic and Public Gardens maintained by governments in various centres as well as visiting many private horticultural establishments, to endeavour whether the Veitch gardens might be enriched by further additions. He set off by way of Rome and Naples to Ceylon, thence overland from Tuticorin to Lahore. He continued to Calcutta and on to the Straits Settlements. In Penang he visited the Botanic Gardens, whose curator Charles Curtis was formerly employed by James Veitch & Sons as a plant collector, before moving on to Singapore where he visited the Botanic Gardens. He then visited Johore, before returning to Singapore in February 1892, when he climbed Bukit Timah (the highest point on the island) with Walter Fox, curator of the Gardens.

He then travelled to Buitenzorg, West Java where he visited the Botanical Gardens. He also explored the crater of Kawah Papandajan (volcano), and visited Lake Bagendit near Garoet.

His travels then took him to Japan, where he met Charles Sprague Sargent of the Arnold Arboretum, and they undertook a joint plant collecting expedition including ascending the Hakkōda Mountains together. After visiting Korea, he reached Australia in 1893. However he found Australia disappointing and wrote that it was easier to collect seed in Japan where there was cheap labour; in Australia "no one will help". He complained that the seeds of many plants "were so tiny he did not know if he was collecting seed or dust". He sent to Kew a collection of dried specimens of 250 species from Western Australia. Later he visited the North Island of New Zealand, before returning to England in July 1893.

Among the results of his journey was the introduction of the large winter-cherry, Physalis alkekengi franchetii. He also re-introduced Rhododendron schlippenbachii and Vitis coignetiae.

A series of letters on the gardens visited during the journey was printed in the "Gardener's Chronicle" (March 1892 – Dec 1894), and privately printed collectively as "A Traveller's Notes" in 1896.

== Veitch Nurseries ==
In 1898 the firm of James Veitch & Sons was formed into a limited company, of which Veitch became managing director. One of the first steps taken by the company, in accordance with the firm’s earlier practice, was to send out Ernest Henry Wilson to China and Tibet to collect plants.

The business proved too much for James, and he suffered a nervous breakdown. He became withdrawn and eccentric, offended customers, and business began to decline. After his death at only 39 years of age, his brother John succeeded to the Chelsea business. He also did not have the ability to run the business successfully, and his uncle Sir Harry Veitch returned to take over control and put the business back on track. Following John's death in October 1914 at the age of 45, Sir Harry (who was knighted in 1912) closed the business.

James died of paralysis at Exeter on 13 November 1907, and was buried there. He had been married in 1898 to Lucy Elizabeth Wood, who survived him without issue.

== Hortus Veitchii ==
In 1906 Veitch, assisted by various members of his family, prepared for private distribution, under the title of Hortus Veitchii, a sumptuous history of the firm and its collectors, illustrated with portraits. The botanical nomenclature was revised by George Nicholson, curator of the Royal Botanic Gardens, Kew.

This book was a study of the history of the botanical plant collecting explorers and hybridists, working for the nurseries of Robert Veitch and Son, Exeter and James Veitch and Sons, Chelsea during the period of 1840 to 1906. The book detailed the 1500 plants the business had introduced and their origins and the lengths its collectors went to secure them (the Veitch nurseries were the first to employ professional plant-hunters). The limited edition volumes were not for general consumption but gifts to libraries, universities, botanists and prestigious customers. Copies of the 1906 edition are now extremely rare and achieve prices of up to £1000.

In 2006, Exeter horticulturist Caradoc Doy, an authority on the Veitch Nursery, re-published a facsimile of this seminal work to mark its centenary. Doy went to great lengths to ensure the authenticity of the book. He meticulously sourced a thick, slightly yellowy paper to mirror the Victorian original and even had a special brass stamping plate made to replicate the cover embossing.

Hortus Veitchii is an essential reference for plants introduced during the Victorian era, listing many which are still available from nurseries today and therefore helping gardeners to accurately replicate historic gardens within that period. This is also important for those wishing to preserve rare plants introduced to Britain at that time, as well as being a fascinating historical account of Victorian plant collecting.
