= John Veitch (horticulturist) =

Scottish horticulturist (1752–1839)

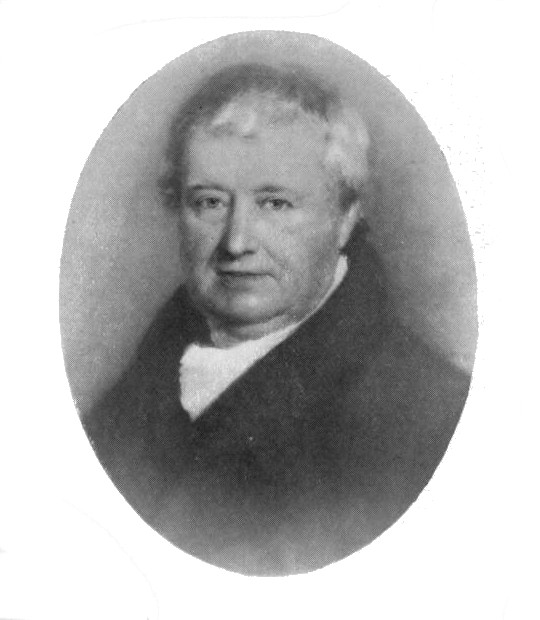
Image of Veitch originally published in Hortus Veitchii in 1906

John Veitch (/viːtʃ/; 1752–1839) was the Scottish horticulturist who founded the Veitch dynasty who created the Exeter-based firm of Veitch Nurseries.

== Life ==
Veitch was born October 1752 in Ancrum, near Jedburgh, His parents were Thomas and Mary Veitch and his father the gardener at Ancrum House. Veitch was the eldest of five children and he worked in a nursery in nearby Hassendean with Lees. He completed his apprenticeship with Lees of Hammersmith on a wage of eight shillings a week. He then moved to Devon, to take up employment with Sir Thomas Dyke Acland, 7th Baronet at Killerton House, Broadclyst. As well as making the most of the superb natural features at Killerton, Veitch had paths and borders added and made full use of the gentle south facing slope and sheltered aspect. He quickly became the agent for the Acland Estate and had established his first nursery at Budlake, near Killerton, by 1800.

Sir Thomas died in 1785, and work on Killerton House had fallen into abeyance. Veitch carried on his flourishing business as a landscape consultant and tree contractor, and in 1800, he became firmly established as a nurseryman following an order for trees to the value of £1,212. These were for Luscombe Castle where the renowned landscaper Humphry Repton was undertaking a major replanting of the main valley area.

Veitch and his wife, Anna Davidson, had six children, including James, who helped his father on the Killerton estate from a very early age.

As the nursery business expanded, Veitch rented more land in 1810 before moving the operation to larger premises at Mount Radford, Exeter, in 1832. He was soon succeeded in the business by his son, James and grandson James junior, with James taking over the Exeter nursery, while James junior was sent to London to train there for two years as a nurseryman, before returning to Exeter, where he helped his father improve and expand the Exeter nursery, before acquiring premises in Chelsea, London.

John Veitch remained at Budlake and spent some time running down the nursery with another son, Thomas. As the Budlake venture closed other land purchases were made including, in 1836, a 7-acre (28,000 m^{2}) site at Broadclyst Heath called "Brockhill" to hold the majority of the tree stock from Budlake and in 1838 11 acres (0.045 km^{2}) were purchased at Haldon for ornamentals. John Veitch entered retirement at Killerton aged 85 years and died there in 1839.
