= Veitch Nurseries =

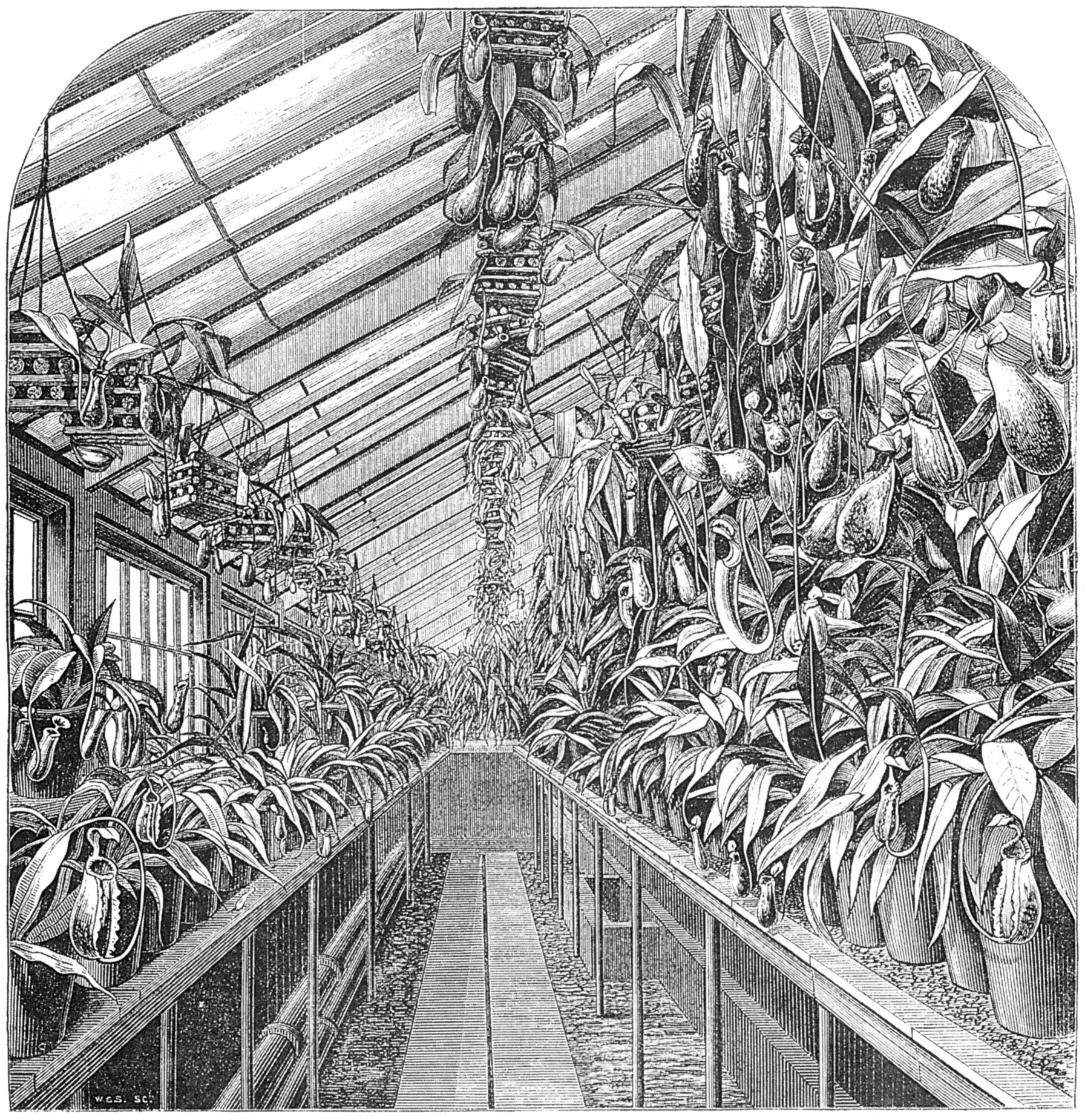
Messrs Veitch's Nepenthes house as illustrated in The Gardeners' Chronicle, 1872.

The Veitch Nurseries /ˈviːtʃ/ were the largest group of family-run plant nurseries in Europe during the 19th century. Started by John Veitch sometime before 1808, the original nursery grew substantially over several decades and was eventually split into two separate businesses – based at Chelsea and Exeter – as it became unfeasible to run the whole operation from one location. There was a Veitch Nursery in Kingston at Coombe, on Kingston Hill. Famous plant hunters in the Victorian period employed by the Veitch family include the brothers Thomas Lobb and William Lobb from Cornwall and David Bowman.

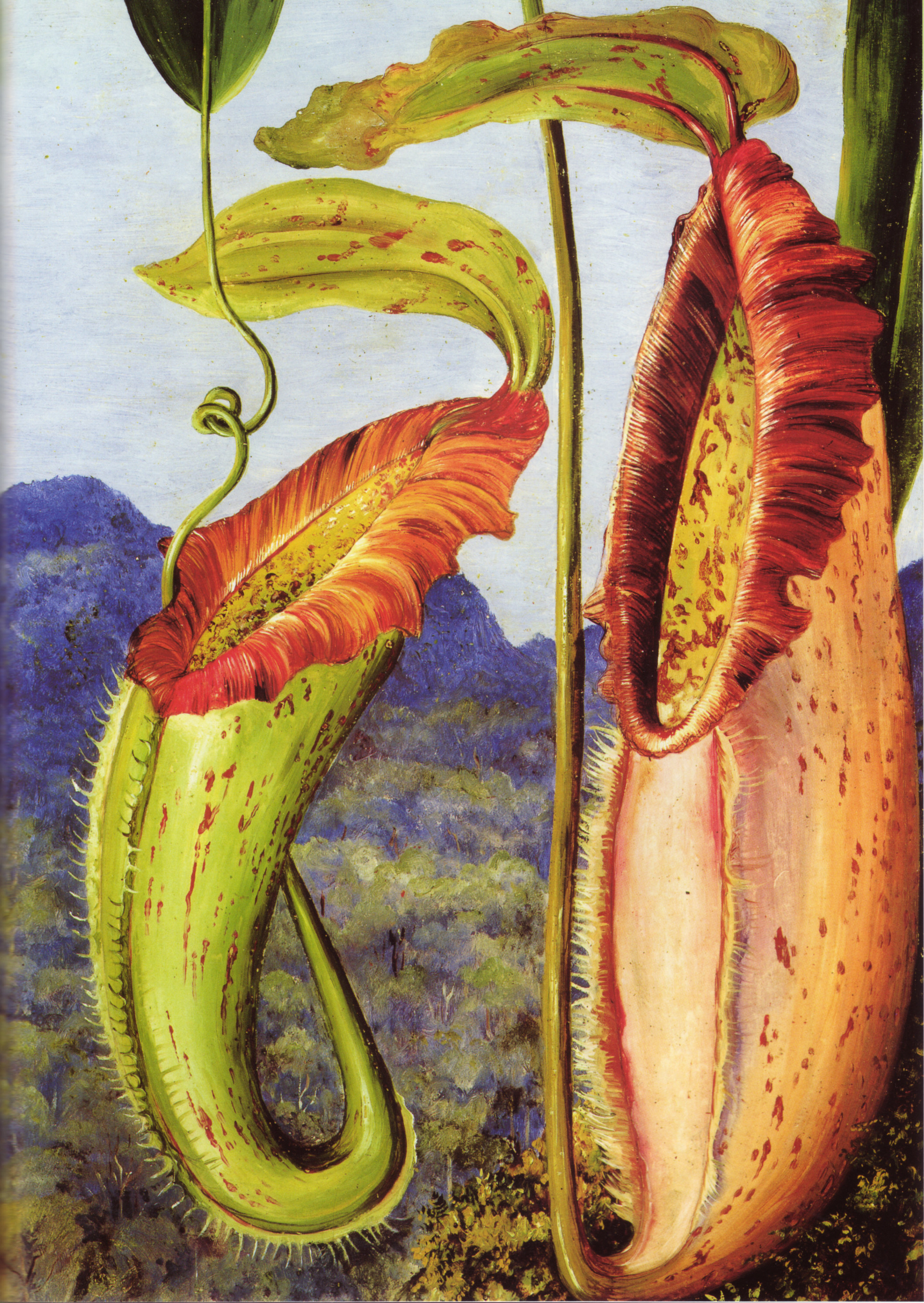
Marianne North's painting of Nepenthes northiana, showing a lower and an upper pitcher

The Veitch's ability to grow exotic plants is noted in William Jackson Hooker's description of Verticordia nitens, and they were able to supply a specimen for its illustration.

The firm had, by the outbreak of the First World War, introduced 1281 plants into cultivation, which were either previously unknown or newly bred varieties (see cultivars). These included 498 greenhouse plants, 232 orchids, 153 deciduous trees, shrubs and climbing plants, 122 herbaceous plants, 118 exotic ferns, 72 evergreen and climbing plants, 49 conifers, and 37 ornamental bulbous plants. In the years to come, more plants followed. The nurseries were most famous for their orchids, although they also introduced several famous plants from other families, such as Nepenthes rajah and Nepenthes northiana. The pitcher plant species Nepenthes veitchii is named in honour of the Veitch dynasty, as is the bamboo grass species Sasa veitchii.

The Chelsea business ceased to trade in 1914, whilst the Exeter business continued under Peter Veitch and later his daughter Mildred. She in turn sold the firm in 1969, when it was bought by St Bridget Nurseries. The business was run as a separate business for a further 20 years, but is now a subsidiary of St Bridget.

John Veitch, England and Corinthian footballer, was a member of the Veitch family and joined the family firm as company secretary.

== Veitch collectors ==
The house of Veitch employed twenty-two recognised plant hunters, including three members of the Veitch family. Most prominent of these were brothers William and Thomas Lobb, Ernest Wilson and Charles Maries. The others were:

- Richard Pearce: Visited Chile, Peru and Bolivia from 1859 to 1866
- John Gould Veitch: Visited Japan, South Sea Islands and Australia from 1860 to 1870
- David Bowman: Visited Brazil in 1866
- Henry Hutton: Visited Java and the Malay Archipelago from 1866 to 1868
- Carl Kramer: Visited Japan and Costa Rica from 1867 to 1868
- Gottlieb Zahn: Visited Central America from 1869 to 1870
- George Downton: Visited Central and South America from 1870 to 1873
- Henry Chesterton: Visited South America from 1870 to 1878
- A. R. Endres: Visited Costa Rica from 1871 to 1873
- Gustav Wallis: Visited Brazil, New Granada, South America from 1872 to 1874
- Walter Davis: Visited South America from 1873 to 1876
- Peter Veitch: Visited Australia, South Sea Islands and Borneo from 1875 to 1878
- Guillermo Kalbreyer: Visited West Coast of Africa and Colombia from 1876 to 1881
- Christopher Mudd: Visited South Africa in 1877
- F. W. Burbridge: Visited Borneo from 1877 to 1878
- Charles Curtis: Visited Madagascar, Borneo, Sumatra, Java and the Moluccas from 1878 to 1884
- David Burke: Visited East Indies, Burma and Columbia from 1881 to 1897
- James H. Veitch: Visited India, Malaysia, Japan, Korea, Australia and New Zealand from 1891 to 1893

== See also ==
- John Dominy
- John Seden
