= Lennoxamine =

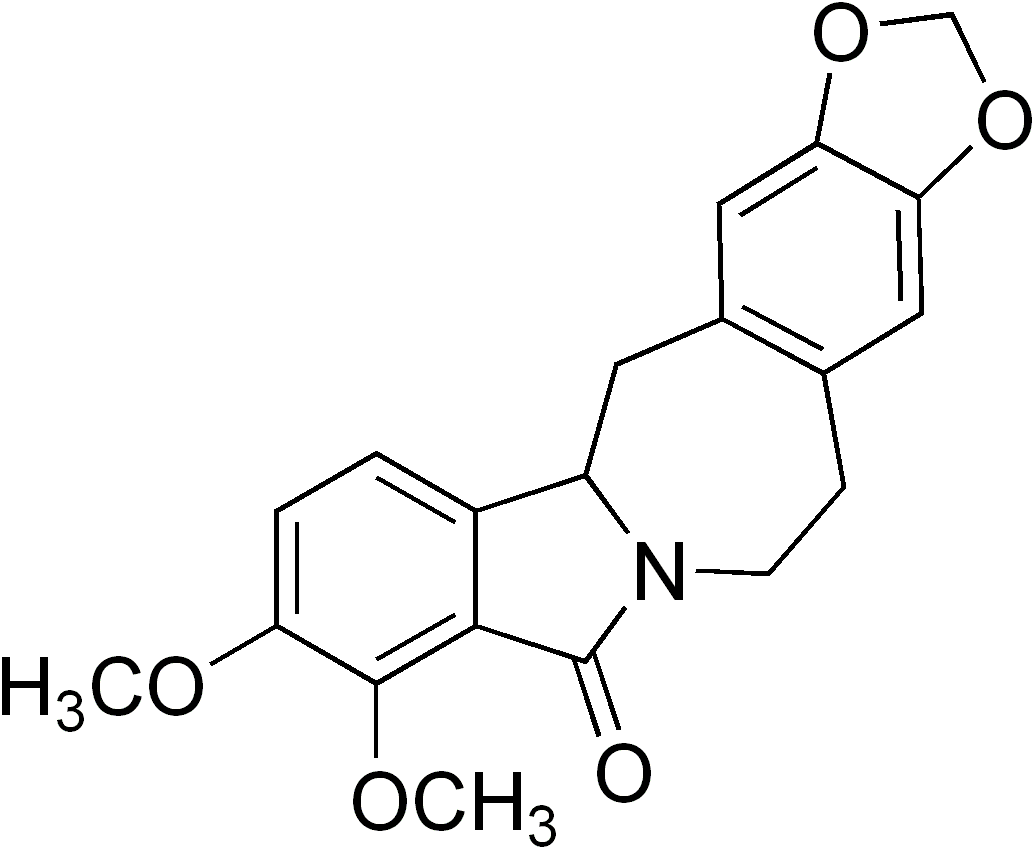
- Skeletal formula of lennoxamine

Identifiers
| CAS Number | 95530-38-4 |
| 3D model (JSmol) | Interactive image; Interactive image |
| ChemSpider | 9101496; 10396941 (3R)-henicos; 9947258 (3S)-henicos |
| PubChem CID | 10926251; 21771725 (3R)-henicos; 11772575 (3S)-henicos |
| UNII | EKT38NF7FQ |
| CompTox Dashboard (EPA) | DTXSID20448602 |
- InChI: InChI=1S/C20H19NO5/c1-23-15-4-3-13-14-7-12-9-17-16(25-10-26-17)8-11(12)5-6-21(14)20(22)18(13)19(15)24-2/h3-4,8-9,14H,5-7,10H2,1-2H3 Key: GIVXYHGHGFITPJ-UHFFFAOYSA-N; InChI=1/C20H19NO5/c1-23-15-4-3-13-14-7-12-9-17-16(25-10-26-17)8-11(12)5-6-21(14)20(22)18(13)19(15)24-2/h3-4,8-9,14H,5-7,10H2,1-2H3 Key: GIVXYHGHGFITPJ-UHFFFAOYAR
- SMILES: COC1=C(OC)C2=C(C=C1)C1CC3=C(CCN1C2=O)C=C1OCOC1=C3; COc1ccc2c(c1OC)C(=O)N3C2Cc4cc5c(cc4CC3)OCO5

Properties
| Chemical formula | C_{20}H_{19}NO_{5} |
| Molar mass | 353.374 g·mol^{−1} |
- Except where otherwise noted, data are given for materials in their standard state (at 25 °C [77 °F], 100 kPa). verify (what is ?) Infobox references

Lennoxamine is an isoindolobenzazepine alkaloid, originally isolated from the Chilean barberry, Berberis darwinii. Lennoxamine has been synthesised from 6-bromopiperonal in 9 steps;; from 3-(3,4-methylenedioxybenzylidene)-6,7-dimsthoxyphthalide in 4 or 5 steps; and from 2,3-dimethoxybenzoic acid in 8 steps.
