= Palicourea lobbii =

Conservation status
- Vulnerable (IUCN 3.1)

Scientific classification
- Kingdom: Plantae
- Clade: Tracheophytes
- Clade: Angiosperms
- Clade: Eudicots
- Clade: Asterids
- Order: Gentianales
- Family: Rubiaceae
- Genus: Palicourea
- Species: P. lobbii

Binomial name
- Palicourea lobbii Standl.

Species of plant

Palicourea lobbii is a species of plant in the family Rubiaceae. It is endemic to Ecuador.

The plant is named after William Lobb (1809 – 1864), the English plant collector.
