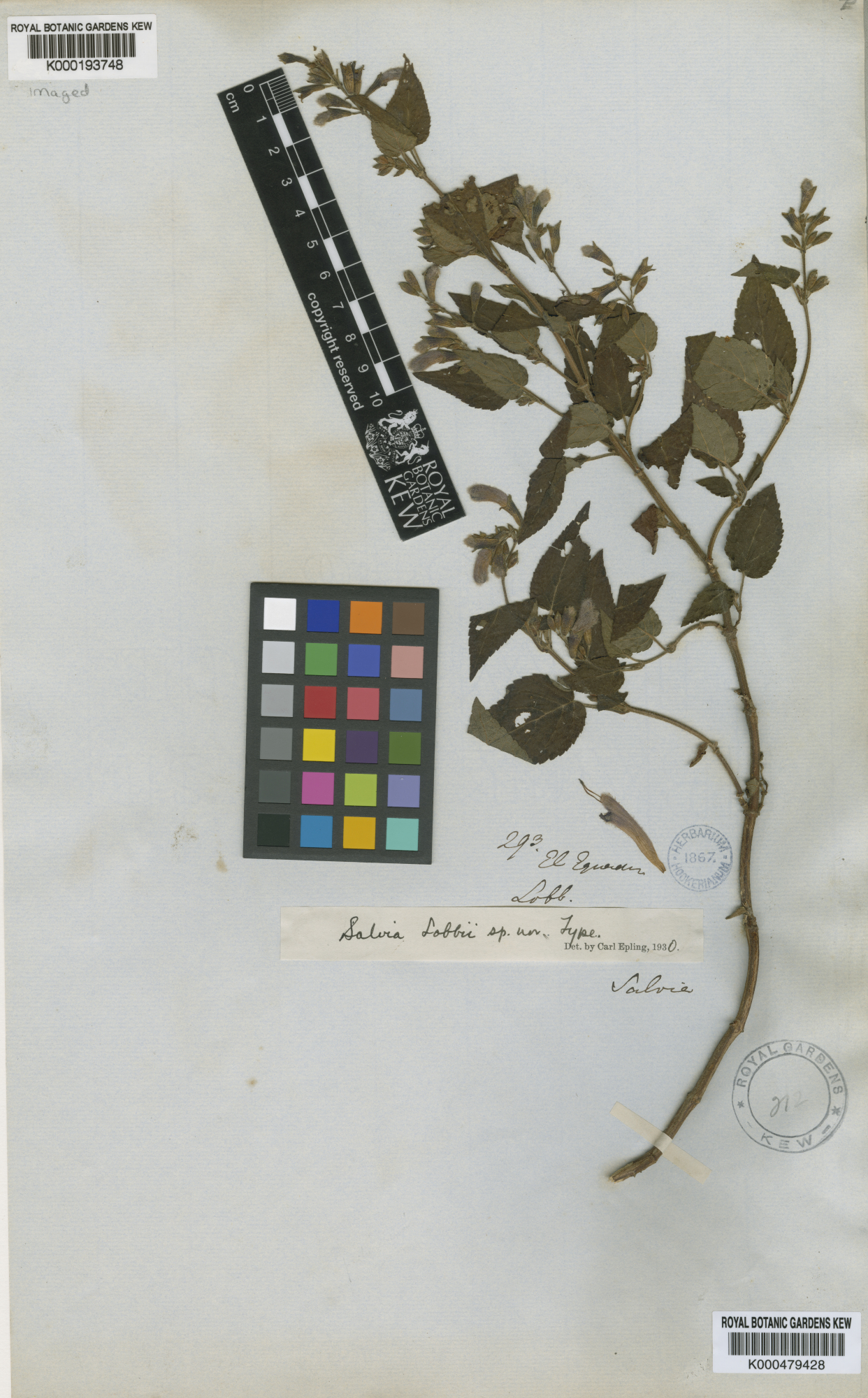

Conservation status
- Data Deficient (IUCN 3.1)

Scientific classification
- Kingdom: Plantae
- Clade: Tracheophytes
- Clade: Angiosperms
- Clade: Eudicots
- Clade: Asterids
- Order: Lamiales
- Family: Lamiaceae
- Genus: Salvia
- Species: S. lobbii

Binomial name
- Salvia lobbii Epling

= Salvia lobbii =

Species of flowering plant

Salvia lobbii is a species of flowering plant in the family Lamiaceae that is native to Ecuador. The plant is named after William Lobb (1809–1864), the English plant collector.
