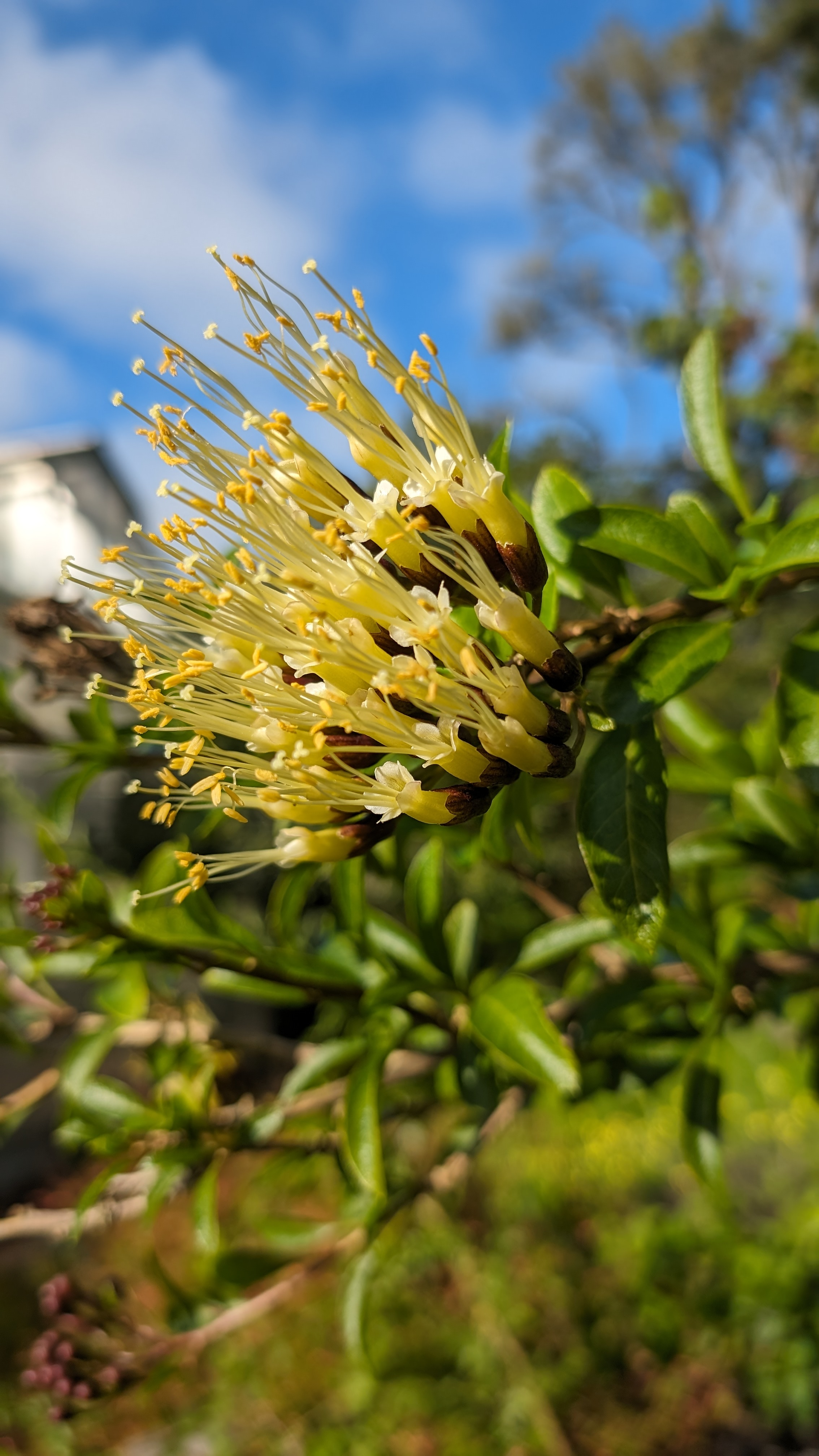

Scientific classification
- Kingdom: Plantae
- Clade: Tracheophytes
- Clade: Angiosperms
- Clade: Eudicots
- Clade: Asterids
- Order: Ericales
- Family: Polemoniaceae
- Genus: Cantua
- Species: C. pyrifolia

Binomial name
- Cantua pyrifolia J.Juss. ex Lam.

= Cantua pyrifolia =

Species of plant

Cantua pyrifolia is a species of flowering plant in the family Polemoniaceae in the order Ericales and is an endemic to Peru. It thrives in modestly arid conditions and can be found in Mediterranean climate plant collections.
