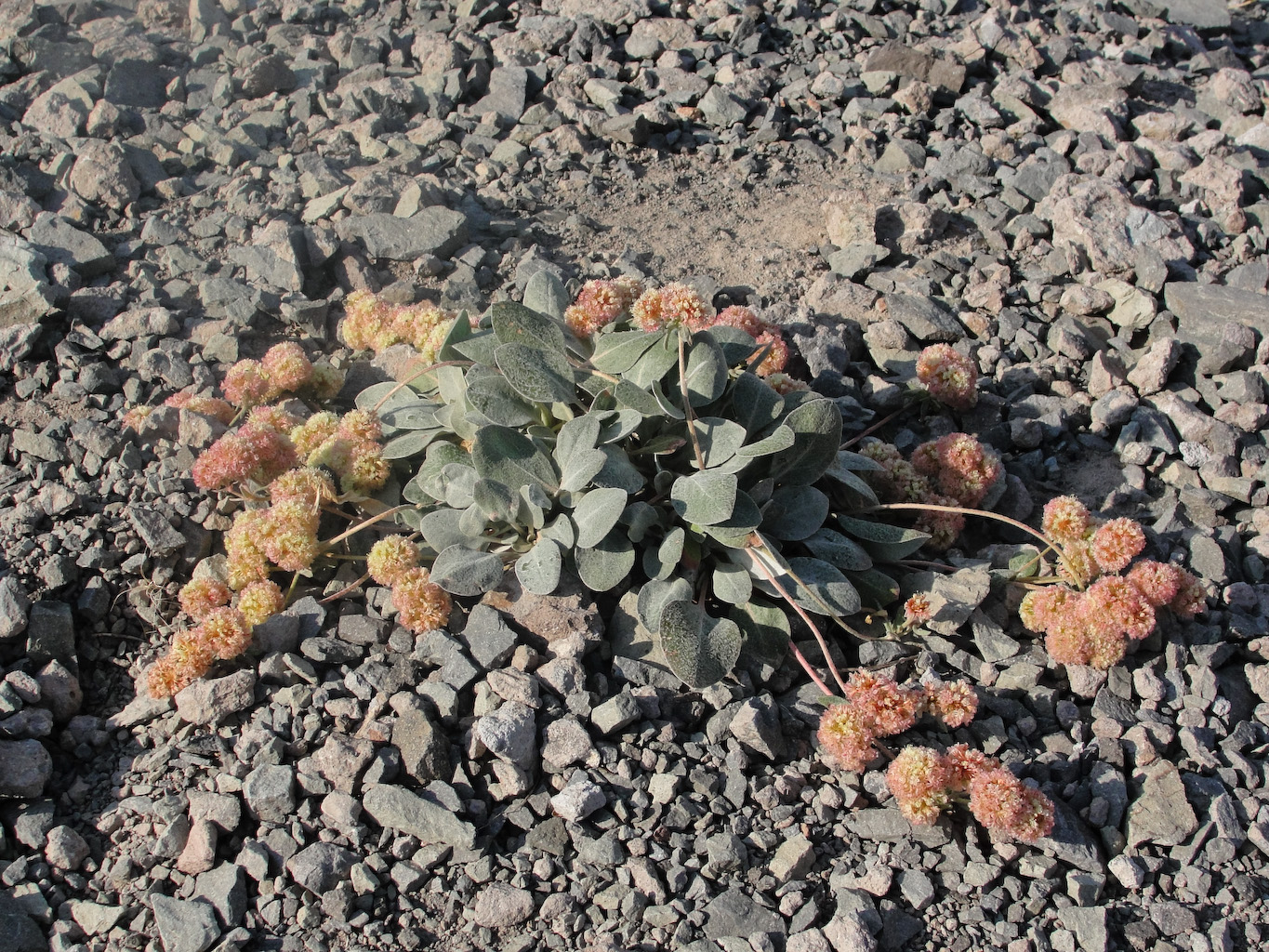

Conservation status
- Apparently Secure (NatureServe)

Scientific classification
- Kingdom: Plantae
- Clade: Embryophytes
- Clade: Tracheophytes
- Clade: Angiosperms
- Clade: Eudicots
- Order: Caryophyllales
- Family: Polygonaceae
- Genus: Eriogonum
- Species: E. lobbii

Binomial name
- Eriogonum lobbii Torr. & A.Gray

Synonyms
- Eriogonum lobbii var. minus Torr. & A.Gray

= Eriogonum lobbii =

Species of wild buckwheat

Eriogonum lobbii is a species of wild buckwheat known by the common name Lobb's buckwheat or prostrate buckwheat. It is native to most of the mountain ranges of northern California and their extensions into Oregon and Nevada. It is found in a number of mountain plant communities. The plant is named after William Lobb (1809–1864), the English plant collector.

== Description ==
This is a low-lying perennial with a woody caudex spreading to about 40 centimeters in maximum width. It forms a patch of round, paddle-shaped, woolly, gray-green leaves one to twenty centimeters wide in rocky areas. Its inflorescence is rarely erect, instead drooping or extending parallel to the ground, rarely higher than 15 centimeters.

At the end of each prostrate stem is a puffy, woolly, rounded cluster of flowers. Each flower is less than a centimeter wide, petals united in a 5-fold cup, and may be cream to yellowish or pink with red stripes. On level ground the flowerheads surround the cluster of basal leaves; on a hillside they all droop downhill.

== Taxonomy ==
Eriogonum lobbii was scientifically described and named in 1870 by Asa Gray and John Torrey. It is classified in the Eriogonum genus as part of the Polygonaceae family. The species has one heterotypic synonym, Eriogonum lobbii var. minus, published by Gray and Torrey soon after the species publication.

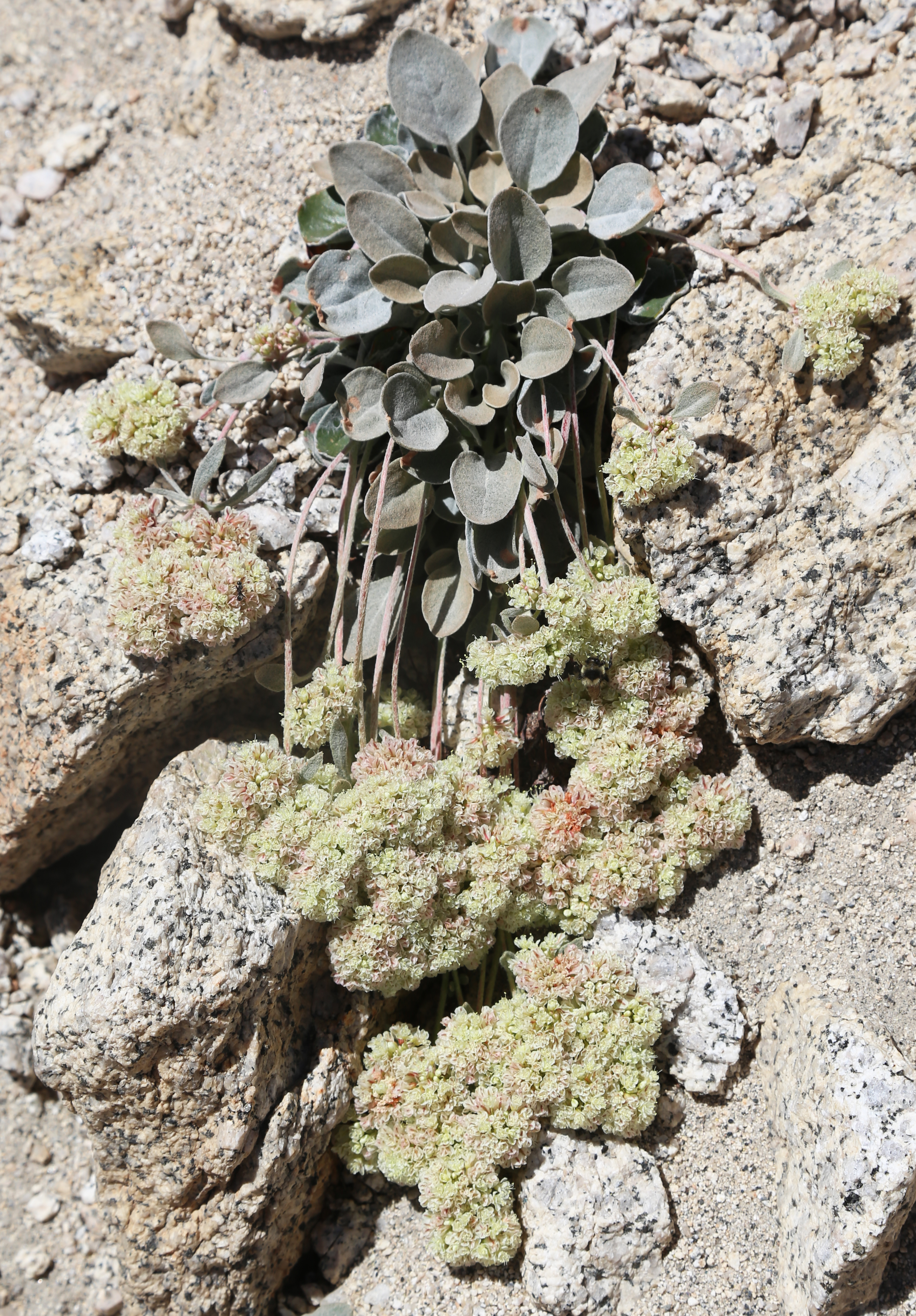
Eriogonum lobbii plant with downhill-drooping yellow-green flowers

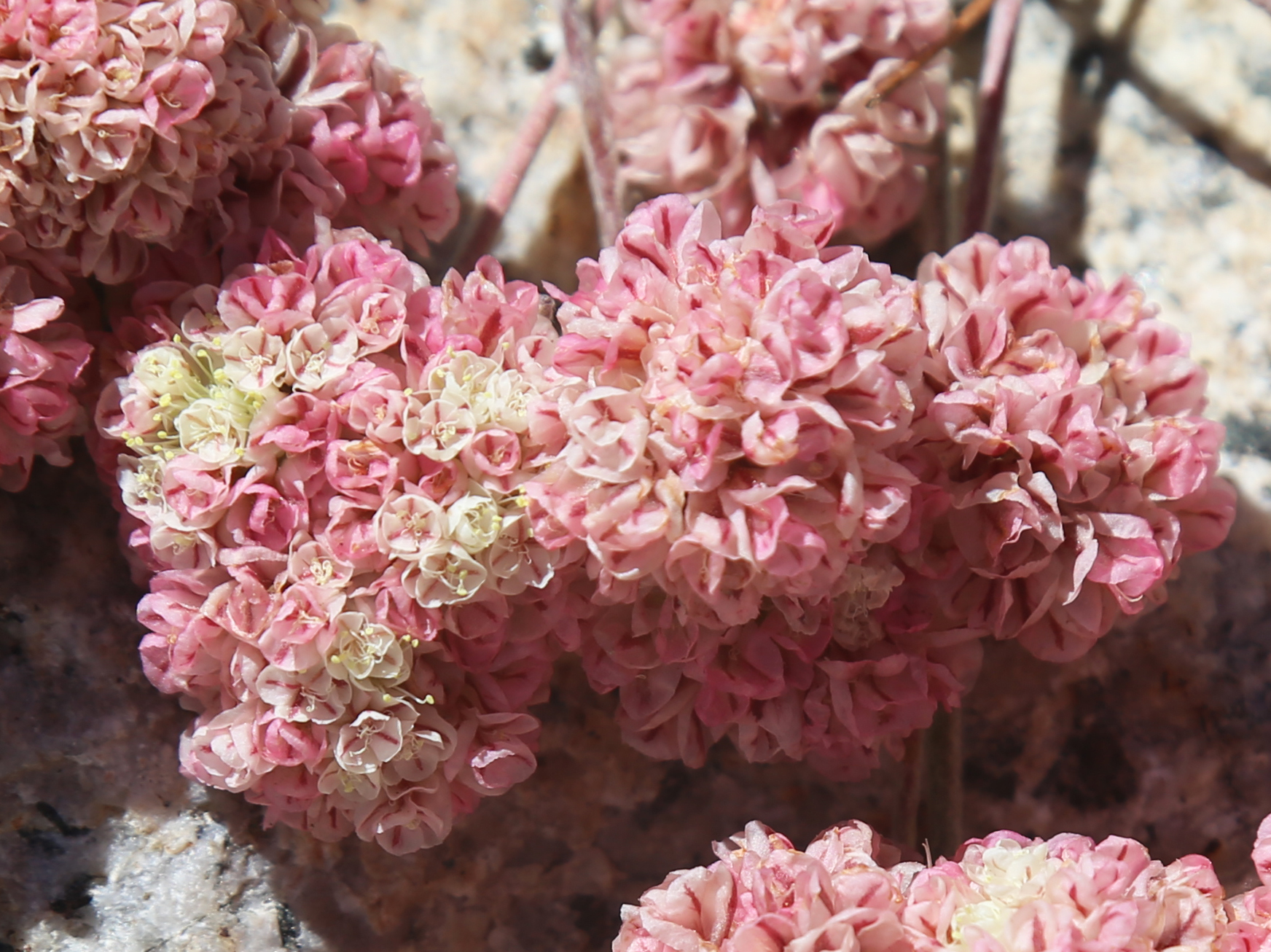
Clusters of white-to-pink 5-fold flowers with red stripes
