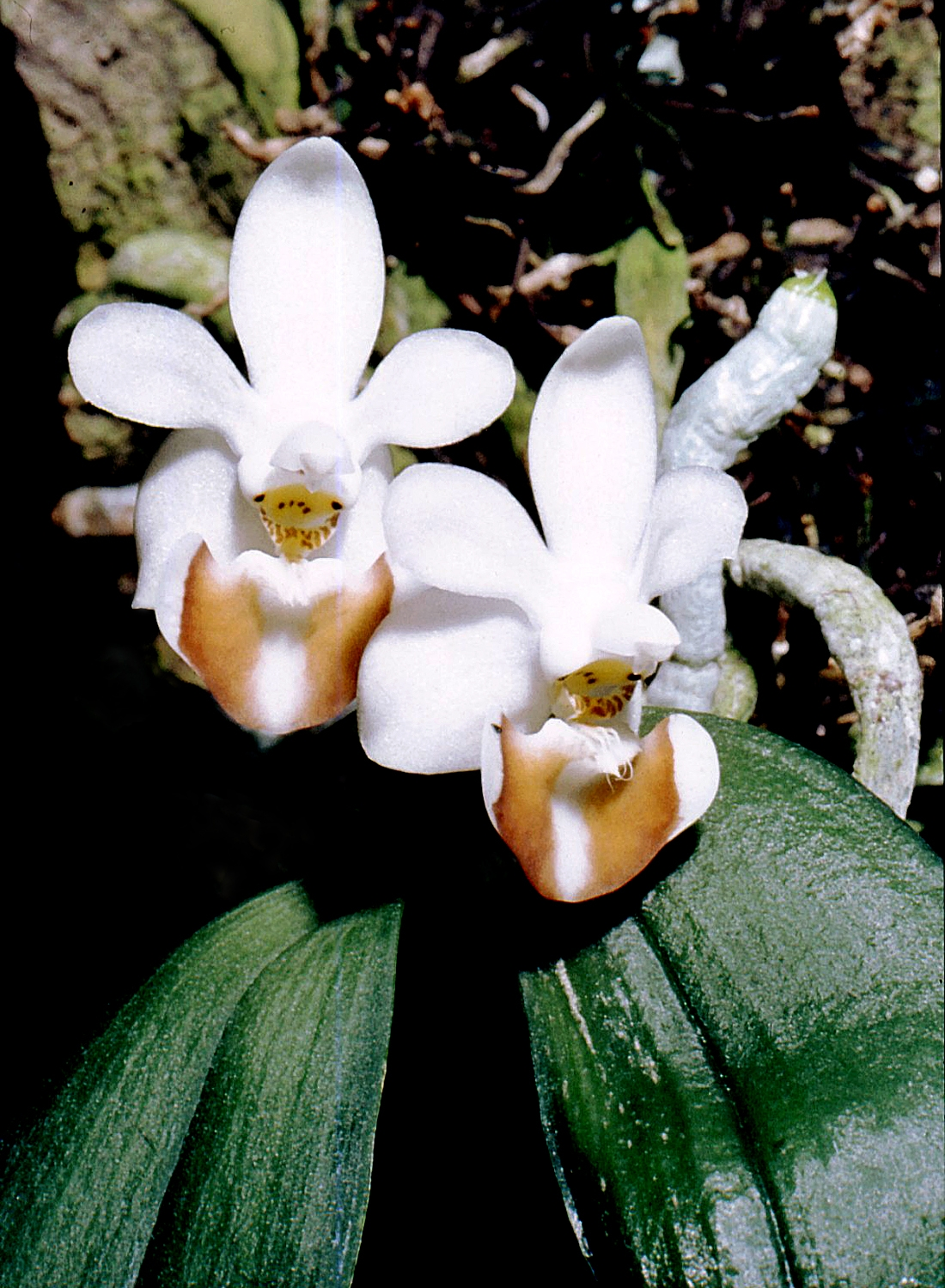
- flower detail of Phalaenopsis lobbii

Scientific classification
- Kingdom: Plantae
- Clade: Tracheophytes
- Clade: Angiosperms
- Clade: Monocots
- Order: Asparagales
- Family: Orchidaceae
- Subfamily: Epidendroideae
- Genus: Phalaenopsis
- Species: P. lobbii

Binomial name
- Phalaenopsis lobbii (Rchb.f.) H.R.Sweet

Synonyms
- Phalaenopsis parishii var. lobbii Rchb.f. (basionym); Phalaenopsis decumbens var. lobbii (Rchb.f.) P.F.Hunt; Polychilos lobbii (Rchb.f.) Shim; Phalaenopsis lobbii f. flavilabia Christenson; Phalaenopsis parishii f. flava O.Gruss & Roellke ex Christenson; Doritis lobbii (Rchb.f.) T.Yukawa & K.Kita; Doritis lobbii f. flava (O.Gruss & Roellke ex Christenson) T.Yukawa & K.Kita; Doritos chip lobbii f. flavilabia (Christenson) T.Yukawa & K.Kita; Phalaenopsis lobbii var. vietnamensis O.Gruss & Roeth; Phalaenopsis listeri E.S.Berk.; Phalaenopsis lobbii f. flava Christenson

= Phalaenopsis lobbii =

Species of orchid

Phalaenopsis lobbii, also known as 罗氏蝴蝶兰 (luo shi hu die lan) in Chinese, is a species of orchid found from the eastern Himalaya to Indochina.It is named in honour of Cornish plant hunter Thomas Lobb. These epiphytic plants have aerial, fleshy, dorsiventrally flattened roots, which radiate from a short stem, which is inclosed by leaf petioles. The stem bears 3-5 slightly fleshy, thin leaves, which are commonly shed in winter. Some plants retain up to two leaves, but most exhibit deciduous leaflessness. Small flowers with reflexed petals of 1.5 cm in diameter are produced between March and May on racemose inflorescences. The midlobe of the labellum shows brown colouration. It is a rare species with extremely small population sizes. It is found in evergreen broad leaved forests on limestone at altitudes of 150–330 m.

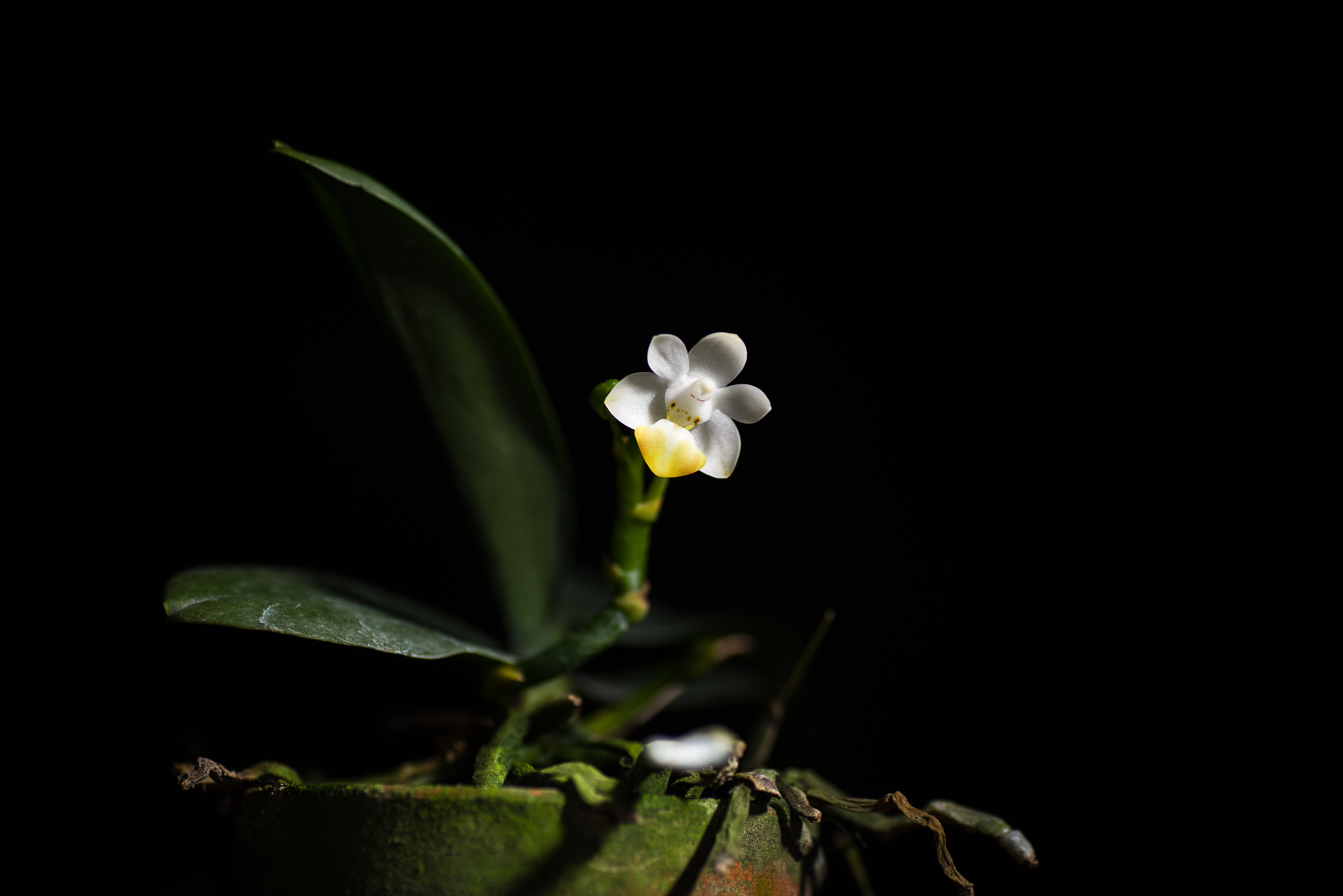

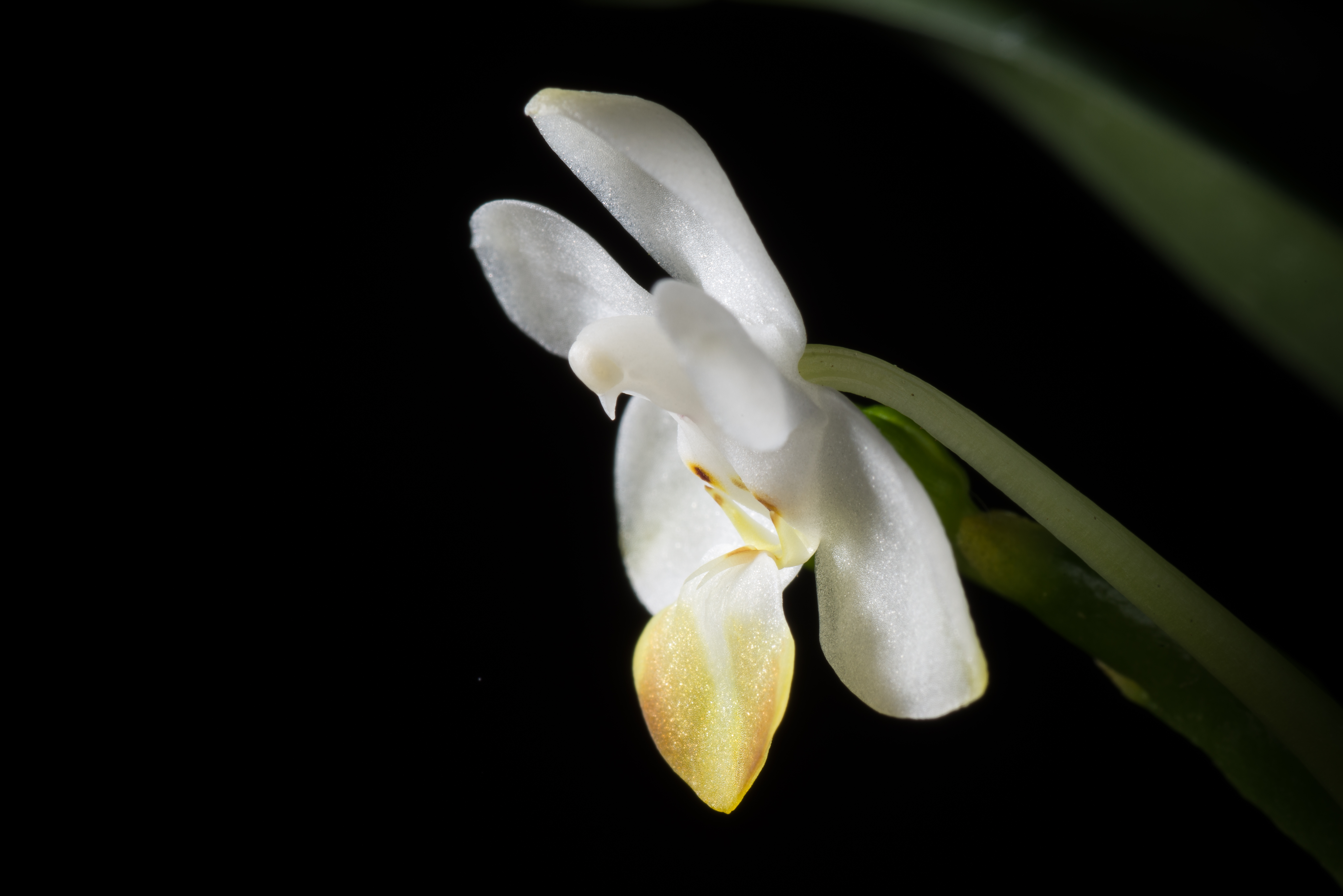

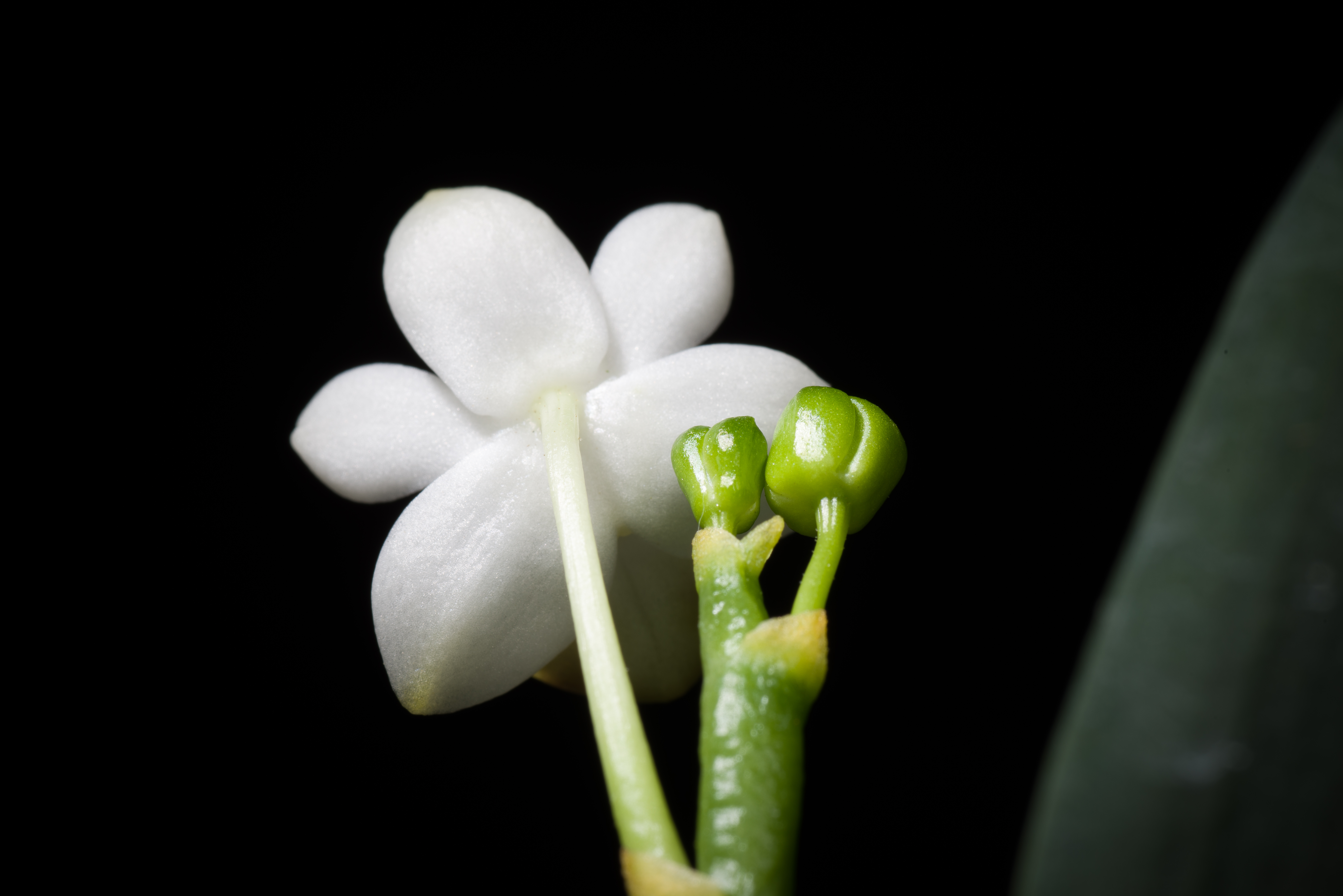

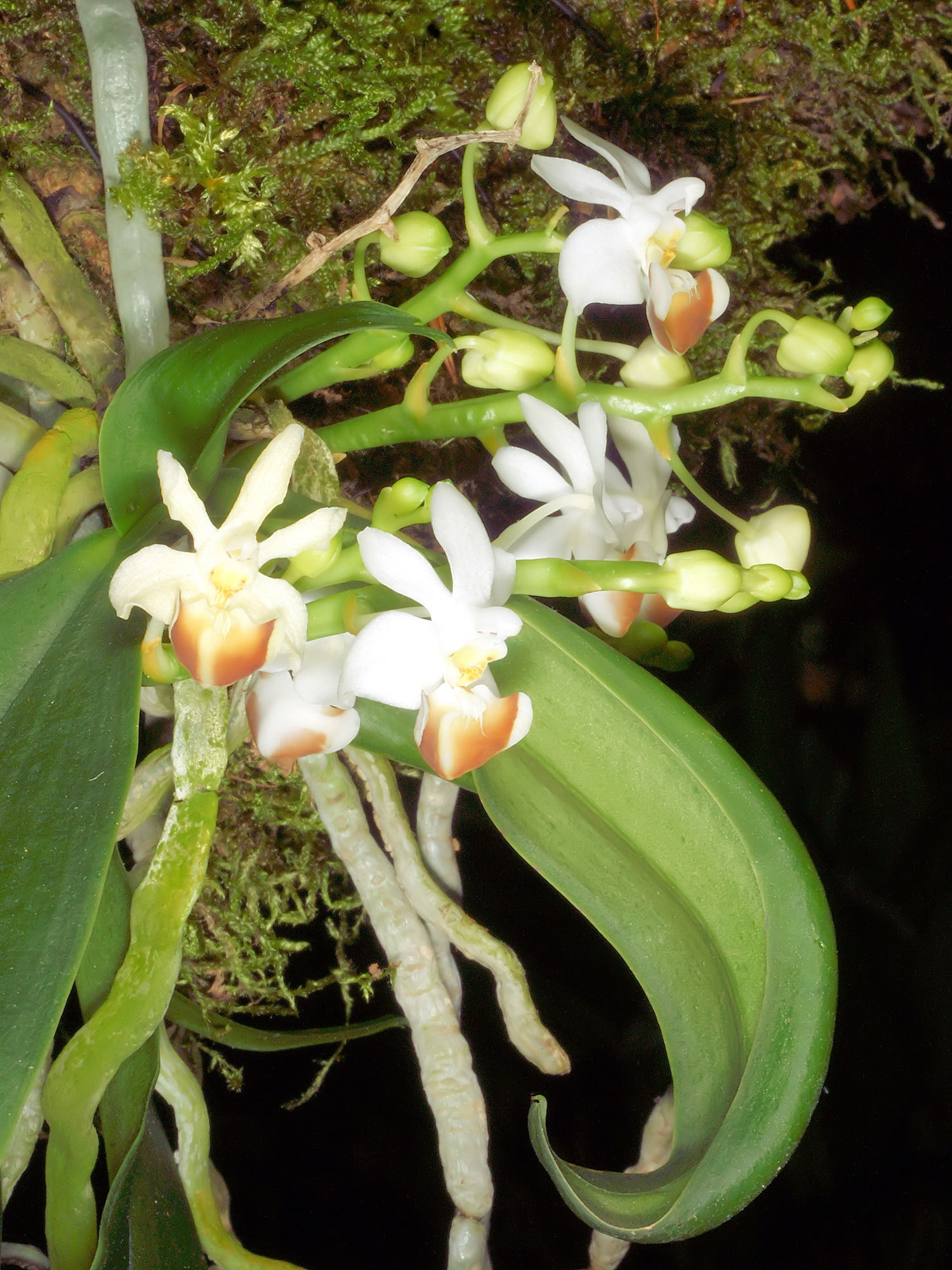

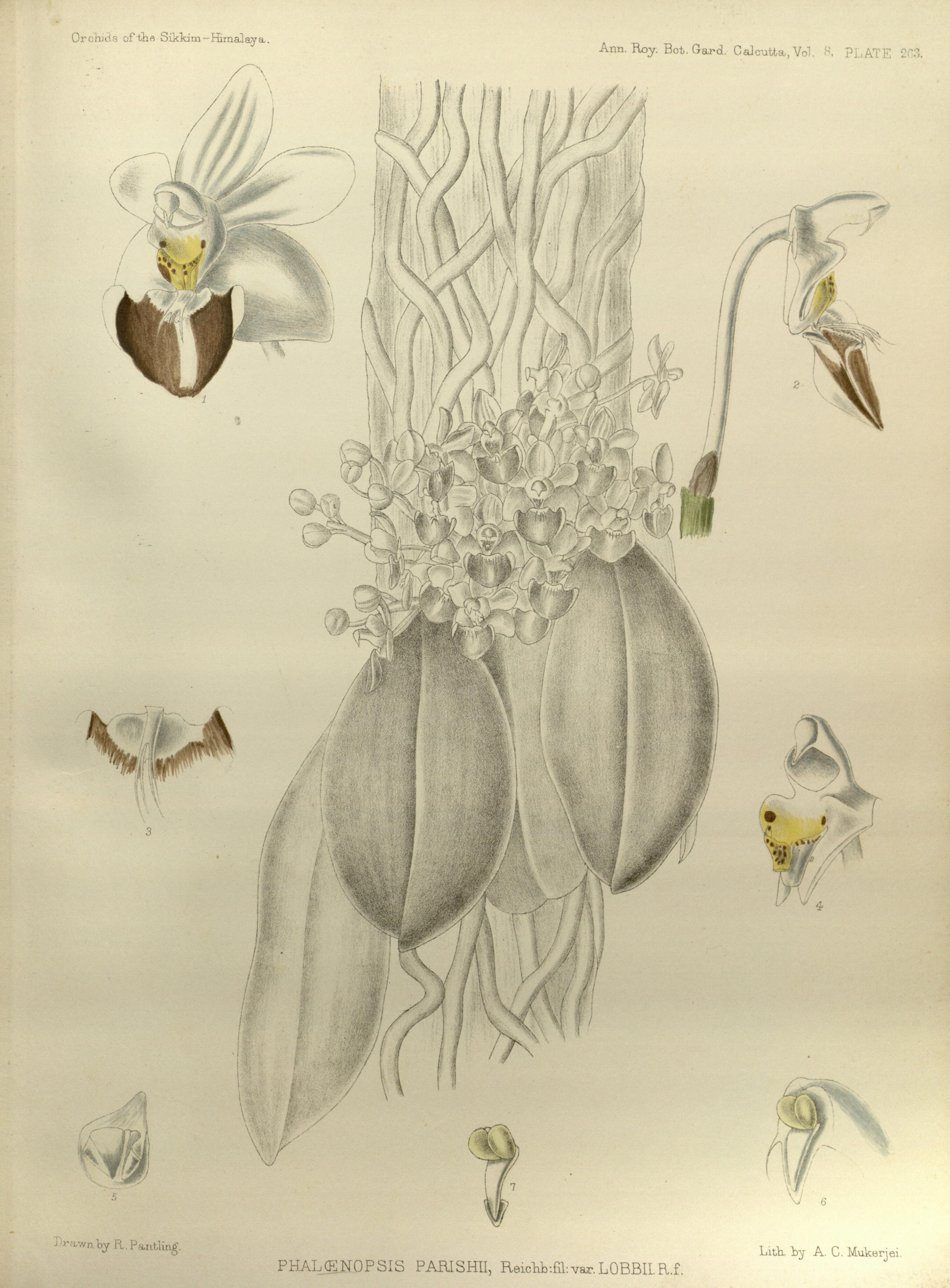
