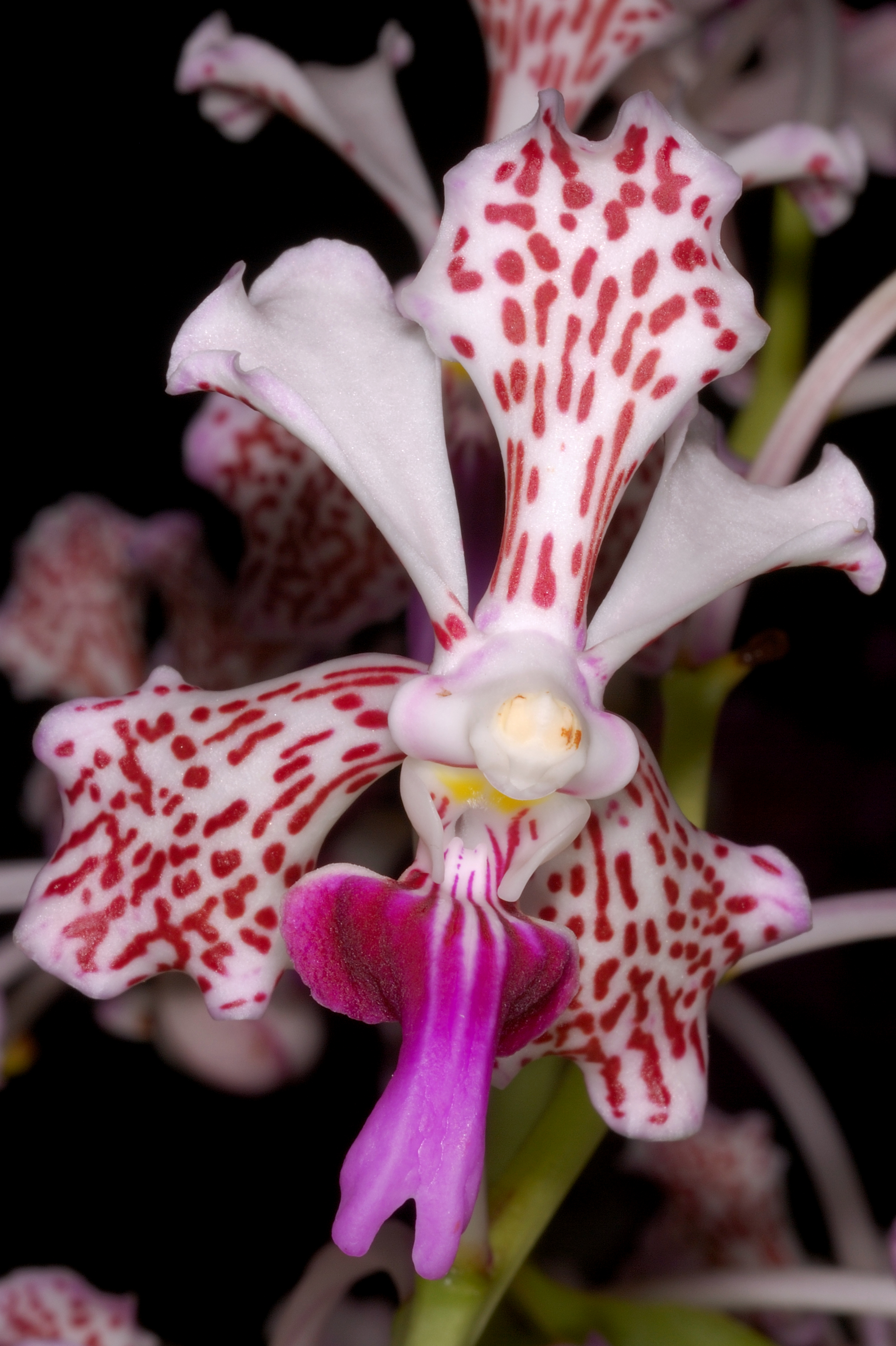

Scientific classification
- Kingdom: Plantae
- Clade: Tracheophytes
- Clade: Angiosperms
- Clade: Monocots
- Order: Asparagales
- Family: Orchidaceae
- Subfamily: Epidendroideae
- Genus: Vanda
- Species: V. tricolor

Binomial name
- Vanda tricolor Lindl.

Synonyms
- Vanda suavis Lindl.; Vanda suaveolens Blume; Limodorum suaveolens Reinw. ex Blume

= Vanda tricolor =

Species of orchid

Vanda tricolor is a species of orchid occurring in Laos and from Java, Bali, Lombok and Sumbawa. It was imported to England by Thomas Lobb, the collector for Veitch Nurseries, from the western part of Java in 1846.
