= Thomas Lobb =

British botanist

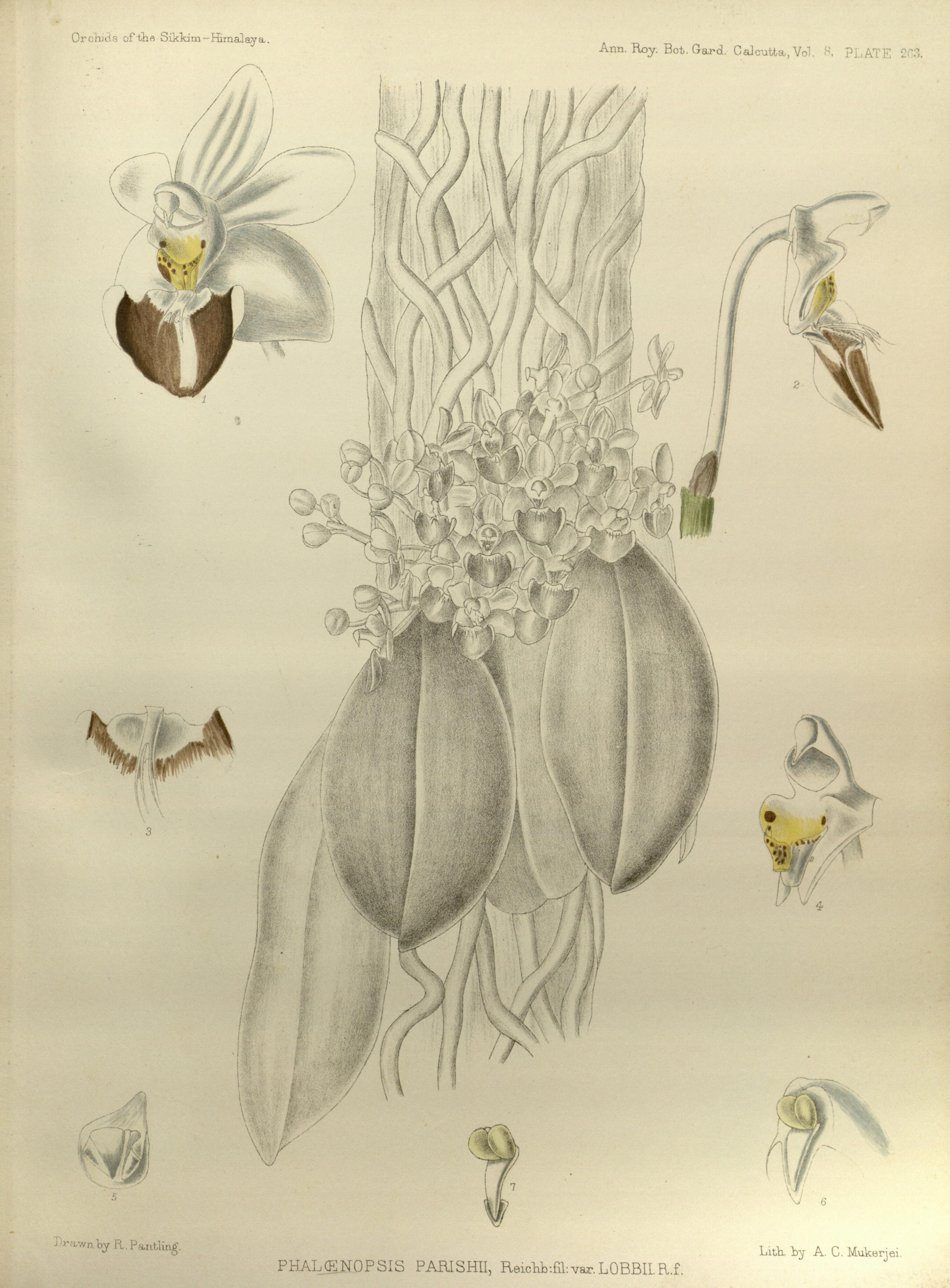
Phalaenopsis lobbii

Thomas Lobb (1817–1894) was a British botanist and, along with his older brother, William Lobb, collected plants for the plant nursery Veitch.

Lobb worked in India, the Dutch East Indies and the Philippines. In 1845 he discovered the first orchid species of the genus Phalaenopsis growing in the eastern Himalayas, at an altitude of ~1,500 m (4,900 ft). This plant, Phalaenopsis lobbii, is named in his honour as was Dendrobium lobbii.

== Early life ==
He was born and raised in Perranarworthal and Egloshayle, near Wadebridge where his father John worked as an estate carpenter at Pencarrow and gamekeeper at Carclew estate, for Sir Charles Lemon. Both brothers, despite varying accounts (neither wrote an autobiography), worked in the stovehouse. Both brothers were encouraged in study of horticulture and botany. Thomas moved to join the Veitch family at Killerton in 1830, aged 13. The Veitch Nurseries moved to Exeter in 1832 and Thomas suggested his brother William as the nursery's first plant hunter in 1840.

== Plant collecting ==
Thomas' first collecting trip, inspired by the success of his brother William Lobb, was from 1843 to 1847, collecting in Java as well as visiting rainforests in Singapore, Penang and Malaysia.

After a rest period working back at the Veitch Nurseries and after seeing William again for the first time since 1840, a second collecting trip took place from 25 December 1848 to 1853. This visited India, Sarawak, Philippines and Burma, India and Nepal. During this visit he briefly met up with Sir Joseph Hooker who was on a collecting expedition in the Khasi Hills.

His brother William returned to America in 1854, finished working for Veitch in 1860 and died in San Francisco in 1864.

Thomas Lobb returned to Java in 1854 to 1857, his third collecting trip.

A leg injury occurred on his fourth and final collecting trip (1858 to 1860) visiting North Borneo, Burma, Sumatra and the Philippines. He retired to Cornwall in 1860 to live near family, having injured a leg, which was eventually amputated either in the Philippines or Cornwall.

Thomas Lobb appears to have parted company with the Veitch nursery in 1860, possibly over compensation for his leg injury and amputation suffered collecting plants in the Philippines in 1860 (according to the Veitch Nursery history, Hortus Veitchii).

A later argument over a possible return to collecting in 1869 contributed to the death by heart attack of James Veitch junior.

After this, Thomas Lobb remained in quiet secluded retirement in Stanley Villa, Devoran, Cornwall, busy with gardening and painting, whilst living off his money from his herbarium collections and letting several cottages he had built.

He died in 1894 and is buried in Devoran churchyard, Cornwall where a small memorial garden and headstone can be found to himself and his brother William.

A tiny new Lobb Brothers planthunters garden was dedicated for community use off Market Street in Devoran in 2017.

== Other plant introductions ==
Plant introductions credited to Thomas Lobb (illustrated in The Plant Hunters by Toby and Will Musgrave and Chris Gardner) show the route of his travels. They were introduced to Britain via cultivation at the Veitch nursery include: Phalaenopsis amabilis (1846), an epiphytic moth orchid from rainforests across Java, Philippines, New Guinea and Northern Australia; Nepenthes sanguinea (c.1847), a blood red marked climbing pitcher plant from cloud forest in Malaysia; Nepenthes albomarginata, a Nepenthes pitcher plant from Borneo; Aerides rosea (1850), a fox-brush orchid from India, Vietnam and China; Aerides multiflora, an orchid from India; Vanda coerulea (c.1850) a blue epiphytic orchid from Burma, Thailand and India; Vanda tricolor (c.1846) a pink-lipped, pale yellow brown patterned epiphytic orchid from Java; Rhododendron veitchianum (c. 1850), from Burma, Thailand and Indo-China. This is one of many Rhododendron species he collected and introduced to Britain including Rhododendron malayanum (c.1850) with small pink flowers, Rhododendron brookeanum (c.1850) with yellow-gold flowers and Rhododendron javanicum (c.1850) with small pink flowers.
