= Berberis darwinii =

Scientific classification
- Kingdom: Plantae
- Clade: Tracheophytes
- Clade: Angiosperms
- Clade: Eudicots
- Order: Ranunculales
- Family: Berberidaceae
- Genus: Berberis
- Species: B. darwinii

Binomial name
- Berberis darwinii Hook.

Synonyms
- Berberis costulata Gand.; Berberis darwinii var. magellanica Ahrendt; Berberis knightii (Lindl.) K.Koch; Mahonia knightii Lindl.

Species of shrub

Berberis darwinii, Darwin's barberry, is a species of flowering plant in the family Berberidaceae. It is native to southern Chile and Argentina and naturalized elsewhere. Regional vernacular names include michay, calafate, and quelung. Growing to 3–4 m (9.8–13.1 ft) tall, it is an evergreen thorny shrub.

== Description ==
Berberis darwinii has dense branches from ground level. The leaves are small oval, 12–25 mm (0.47–0.98 in) long and 5–12 mm (0.20–0.47 in) broad, with a spiny margin; they are borne in clusters of 2–5 together, subtended by a three-branched spine 2–4 mm long. The flowers are orange, 4–5 mm long, produced in dense racemes 2–7 cm long in spring. The fruit is a small purple-black berry 4–7 mm diameter, ripening in summer.

Berberis darwinii was first described in 1835 by Charles Darwin during the voyage of the Beagle. It was one of many named in honour of Darwin. The berries of this species are known to have been consumed by prehistoric native peoples in the Patagonian region over millennia.

It is a popular garden and hedging shrub in the British Isles. The Royal Horticultural Society has given the species its Award of Garden Merit. The edible fruit is very acidic.

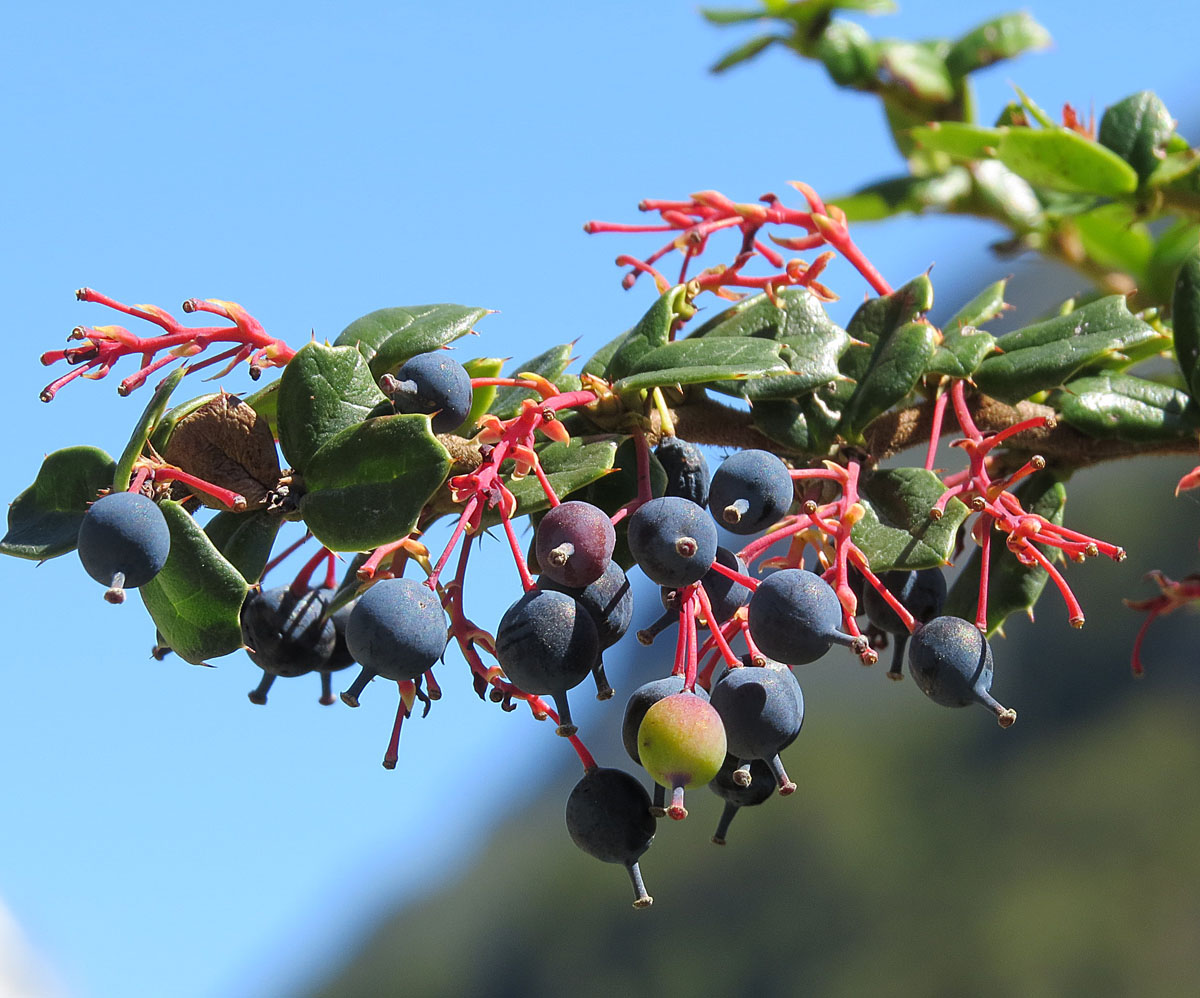
Fruit

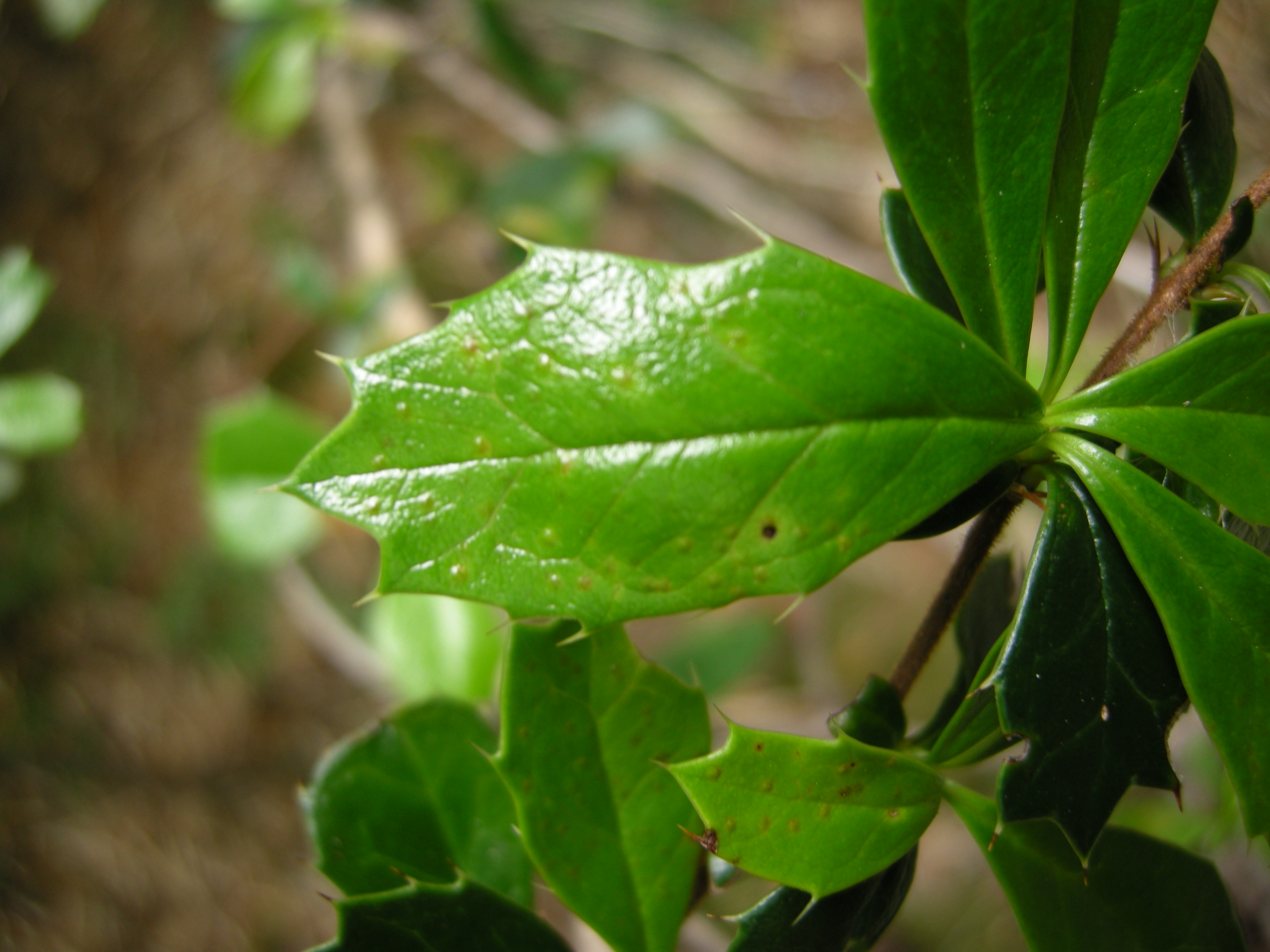
Leaves

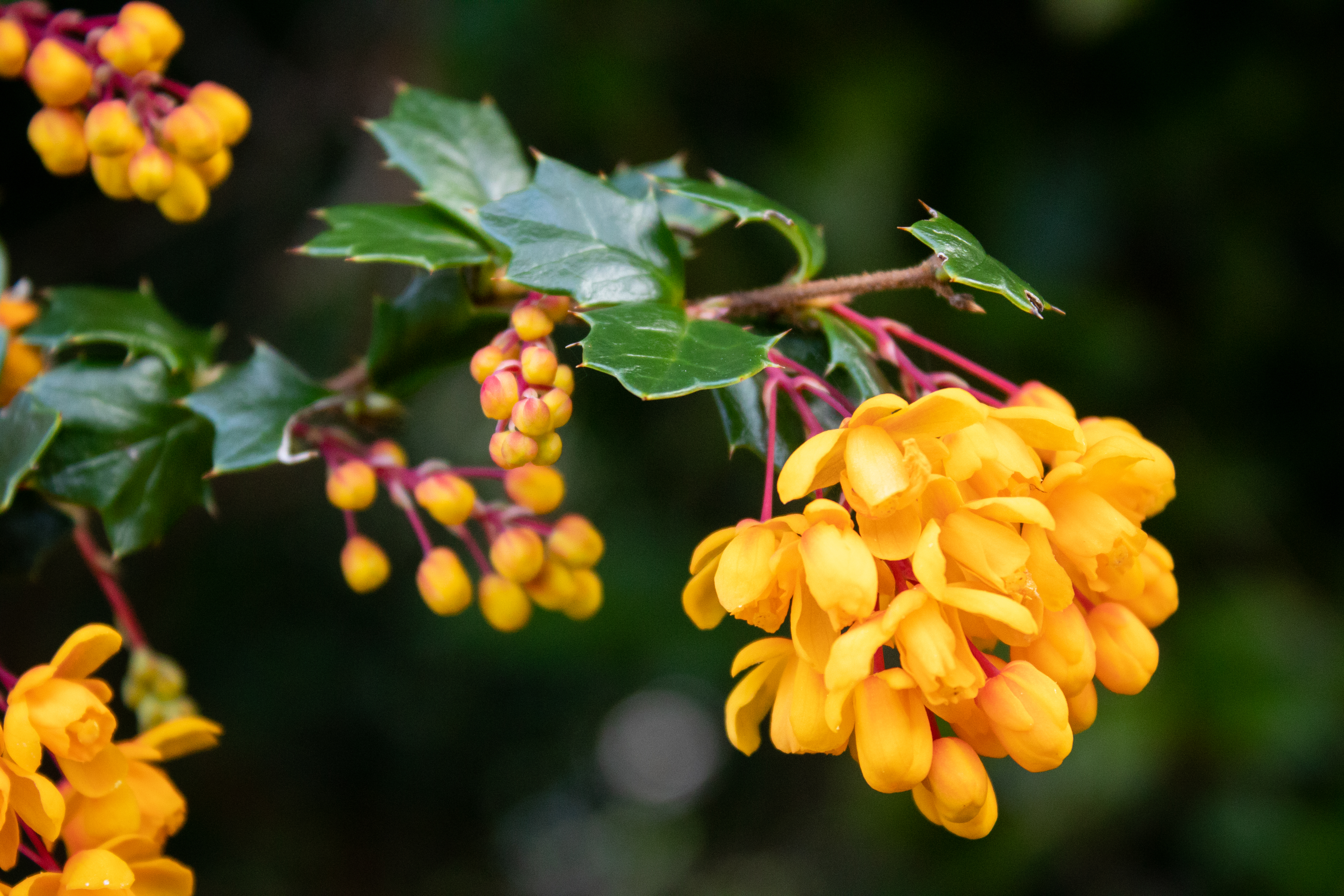
Close-up of flowers

== Invasive species ==
Berberis darwinii is regarded as an invasive plant pest in New Zealand that escaped from gardens into indigenous plant communities via its bird-dispersed seeds. It is considered a serious threat to indigenous ecosystems throughout New Zealand and is listed on the National Pest Plant Accord. In Australia, the species is naturalised in the states of South Australia, Victoria, New South Wales and Tasmania. The species has also become sparingly naturalized in the US states of California and Oregon. It is often planted and sometimes naturalized in Ireland.

== See also ==
- Lennoxamine
