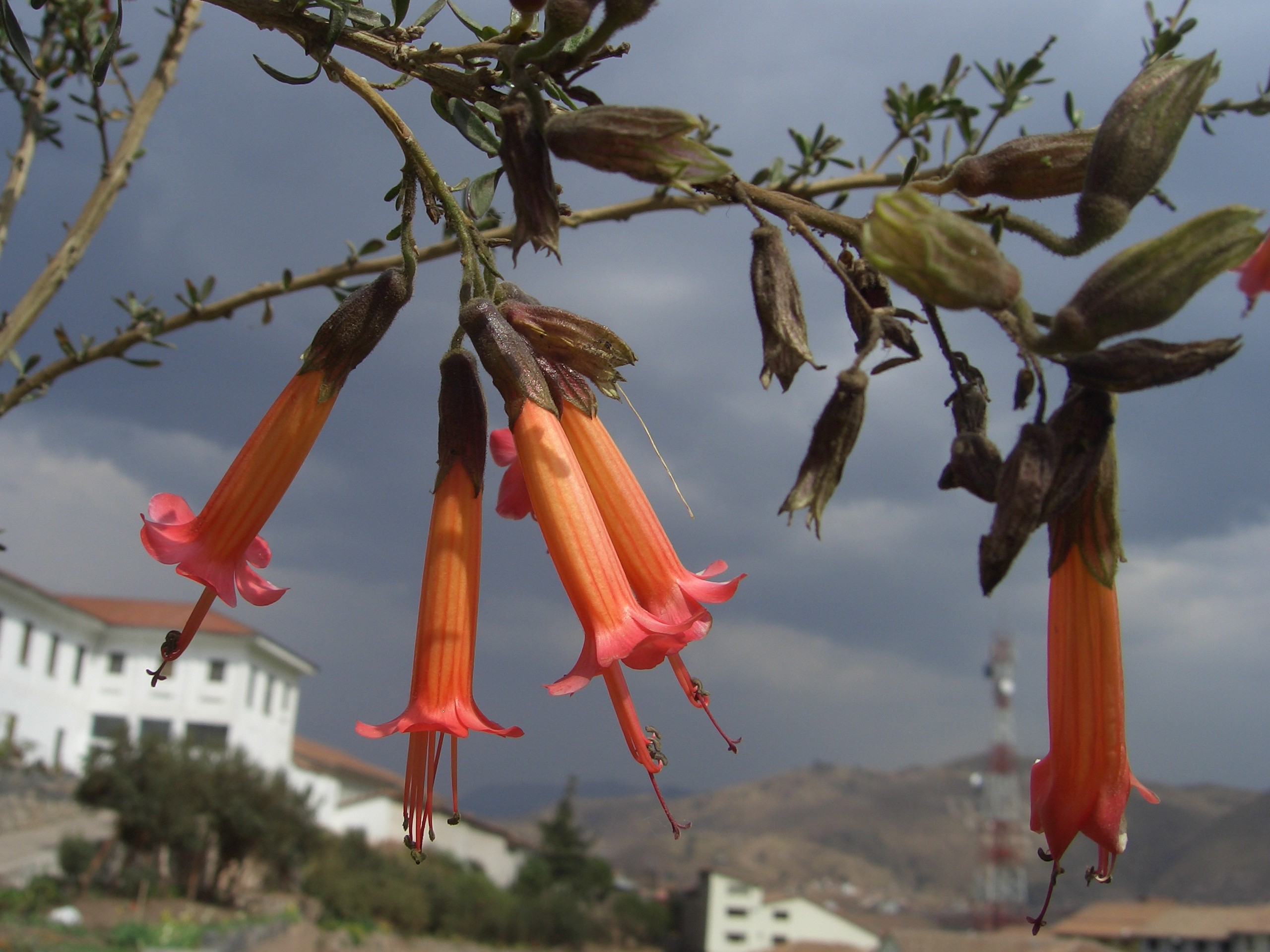
- Cantutas in the garden of Qurikancha (today's Convento Santo Domingo)

Conservation status
- Least Concern (IUCN 3.1)

Scientific classification
- Kingdom: Plantae
- Clade: Tracheophytes
- Clade: Angiosperms
- Clade: Eudicots
- Clade: Asterids
- Order: Ericales
- Family: Polemoniaceae
- Genus: Cantua
- Species: C. buxifolia

Binomial name
- Cantua buxifolia Lam.

= Cantua buxifolia =

Species of plant

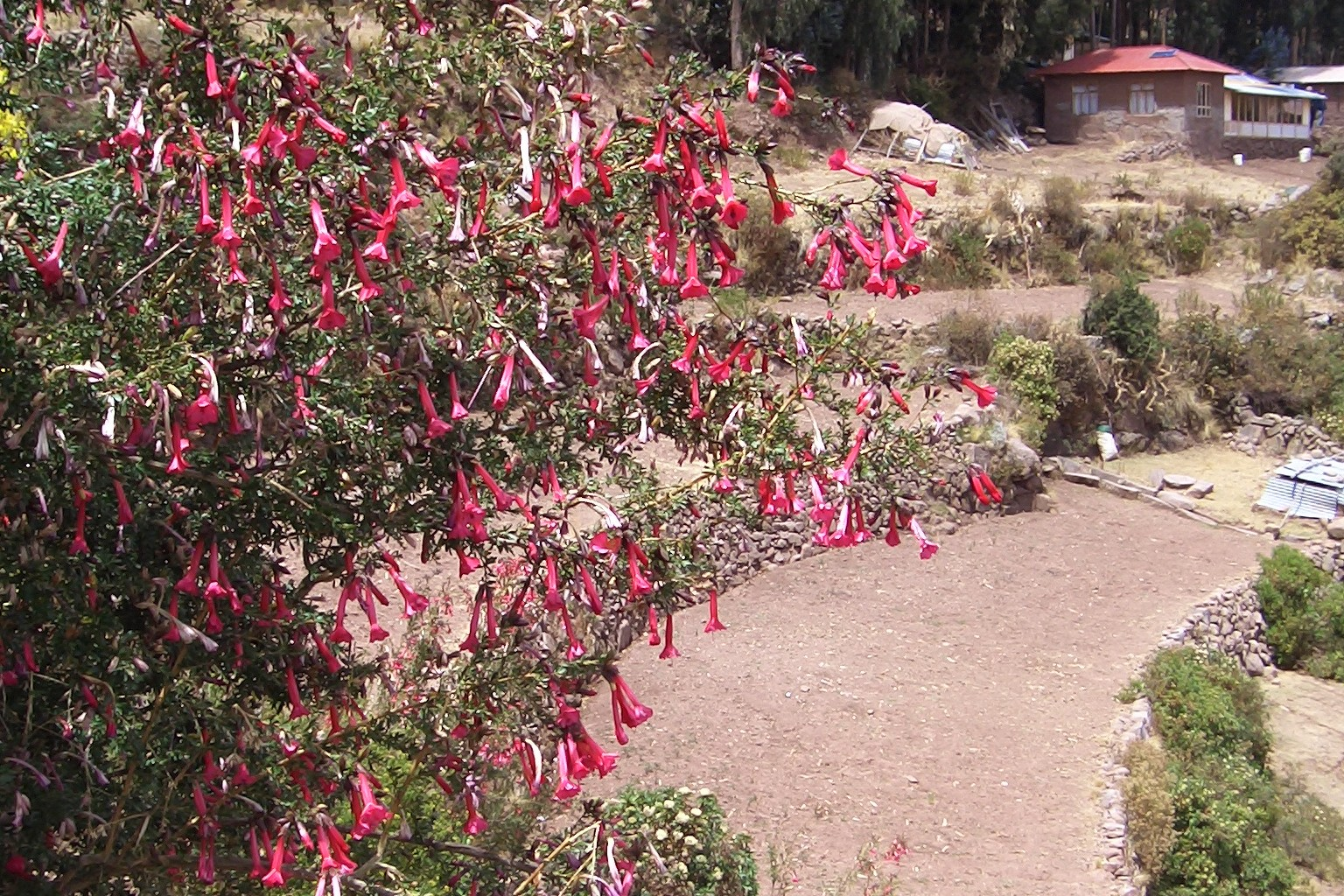
Cantutas in Taquile Island, Lake Titicaca, Peru

Cantua buxifolia, (/ˈkæntjuə bʌksɪˈfoʊliə/, Hispanicized spellings cantuta, cantu), known as qantu, qantus or qantuta (Quechua) is a flowering plant found in the high valleys of the Yungas of the Andes mountains in western South America. Also known as the Peruvian magic tree, it is an evergreen shrub growing to 4 m (13 ft) tall by 2.5 m (8.2 ft) wide with small leaves and clusters of brilliant pink, narrow tubular flowers in early spring.

It is the national flower of Peru and one of two national flowers of Bolivia, the other being the patujú (Heliconia rostrata).The Bolivian national flower is in fact a particular variety of qantuta, the qantuta tricolor, which has red petals, a yellow floral tube and a green calyx, reflecting the colors of the national flag.

The Latin specific epithet buxifolia means "with leaves like Buxus (box)".

This plant requires sheltered conditions where the temperature does not fall below −5 °C (23 °F). In climates colder than that, it should be grown under glass but may be placed outside in summer. This plant has gained the Royal Horticultural Society's Award of Garden Merit.

== Inca legend ==
The Inca legend associated with the cantua is the tale of two kings named Illimani and Illampu and their sons. Both kings were powerful and wealthy rulers of a vast country in the Qullasuyu region (today's Bolivian Altiplano), and each had a beloved son whom the people held in great esteem. But as time passed, the kings became irritated at each other's prosperity, and eventually one of them attacked the other.

During the battle, the two kings mortally wounded each other, and were carried away. Each on his dying bed called his son and had him vow to avenge him, even if each son had been opposed to the war in the first place. Bound by their pledge, the sons prepared and led a second war even though they held no grudge against each other. History repeated, and each son inflicted a fatal wound on the other.

But instead of harsh words, the dying sons generously forgave each other, and asked that their servants place them side by side on the green grass of the battlefield. Then appeared Pachamama, goddess of fertility, who told the young kings before they died that they should not have suffered from their fathers' unjustified enmity. To punish their dead fathers, their stars fell from the sky and became the snow-covered mountains still named Illimani and Illampu which are some of the highest peaks in Bolivia.

The rivers of their slowly melting snow are their tears of regret and fertilize the valleys. The cantua bloom symbolizes the people's unity, and bears the colours of the two kings' sons (red and yellow), as well as green (standing for hope).

== Common names ==
Common names include flor del Inca (Spanish for 'flower of the Inca'), magic-flower, magic-flower-of-the-Incas, magic-tree, and sacred-flower-of-the-Incas.
