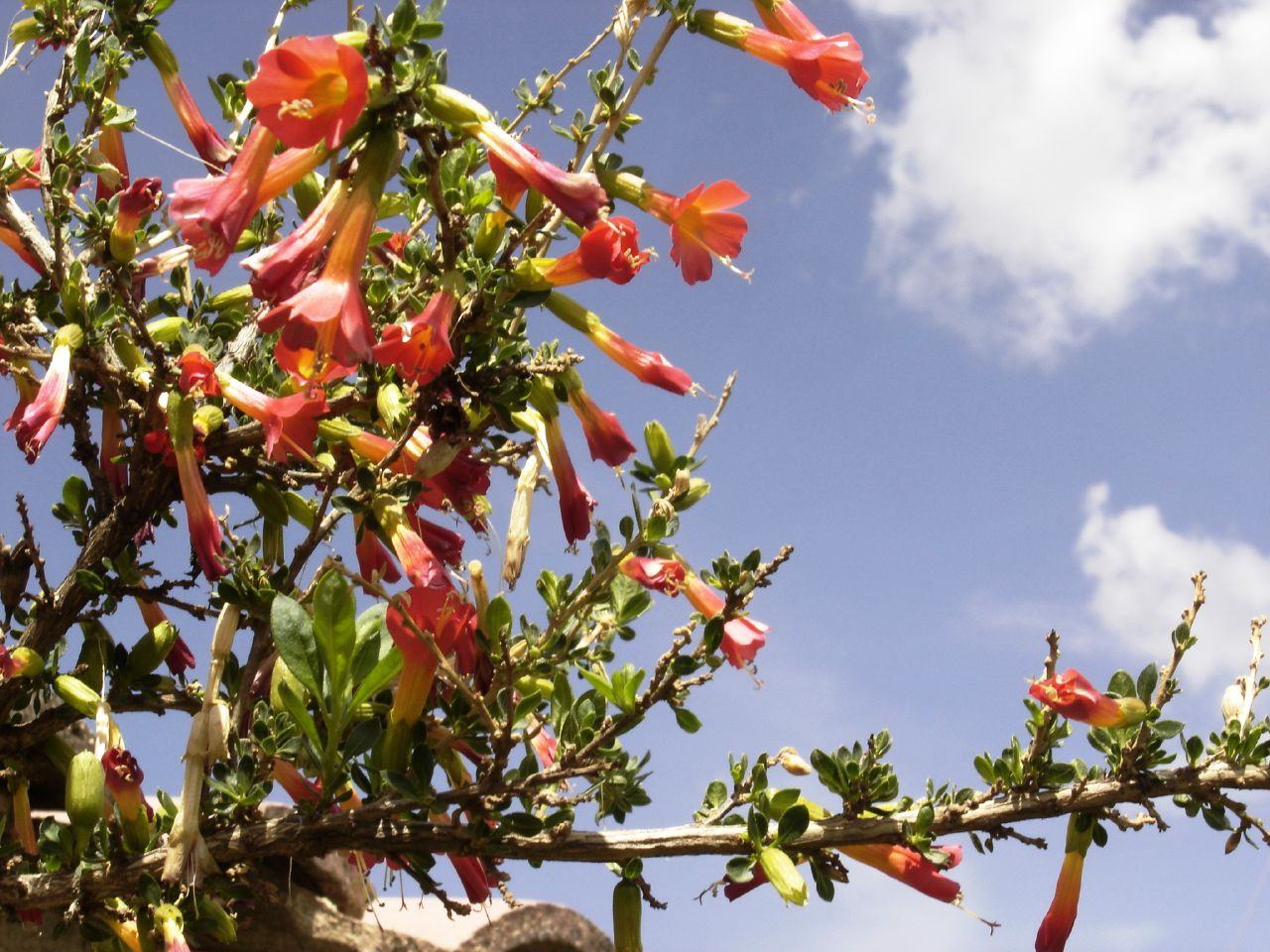
- Cantua buxifolia

Scientific classification
- Kingdom: Plantae
- Clade: Tracheophytes
- Clade: Angiosperms
- Clade: Eudicots
- Clade: Asterids
- Order: Ericales
- Family: Polemoniaceae
- Genus: Cantua; J.Juss. ex Lam.

= Cantua =

Genus of flowering plants

Cantua is a genus of flowering plants in the family Polemoniaceae which is in the order Ericales. They are restricted to central South America where many species are endemics in the countries of occurrence.

There are currently about 12 recognised species including:

- Cantua bicolor Lem., native to Bolivia and Peru
- Cantua buxifolia Juss. ex Lam., native to Bolivia
- Cantua candelilla Brand
- Cantua cuzcoensis Infantes
- Cantua dendritica J.M.Porter & Prather
- Cantua flexuosa (Ruiz & Pav.) Pers.
- Cantua mediamnis J.M.Porter & Prather
- Cantua pyrifolia Juss. ex Lam.
- Cantua quercifolia Juss.
- Cantua volcanica J.M.Porter & Prather

Synonyms include:

- Huthia Brand
- Periphragmos Ruiz & Pav.
- Tunaria Kuntze
