= Arniston =

Arniston may refer to:

- Arniston, Midlothian, a village in Scotland
  - Arniston House, an 18th-century country house in Scotland
  - Arniston Rangers F.C., a Scottish junior football club
- Arniston, Western Cape, a small seaside settlement also known as Waenhuiskrans, South Africa
- Arniston (ship), an East Indiaman ship wrecked in 1815

== See also ==
- Robert Dundas, of Arniston, the elder (1685–1753), Scottish judge
- Robert Dundas, of Arniston, the younger (1713–1787), Scottish judge
- Robert Dundas of Arniston (1758–1819), Scottish judge
