= Henry Chesterton =

British plant collector

Joseph Henry Chesterton (1837 – 26 January 1883) was a British plant collector who was sent by James Veitch & Sons to search for orchids in South America with much success.

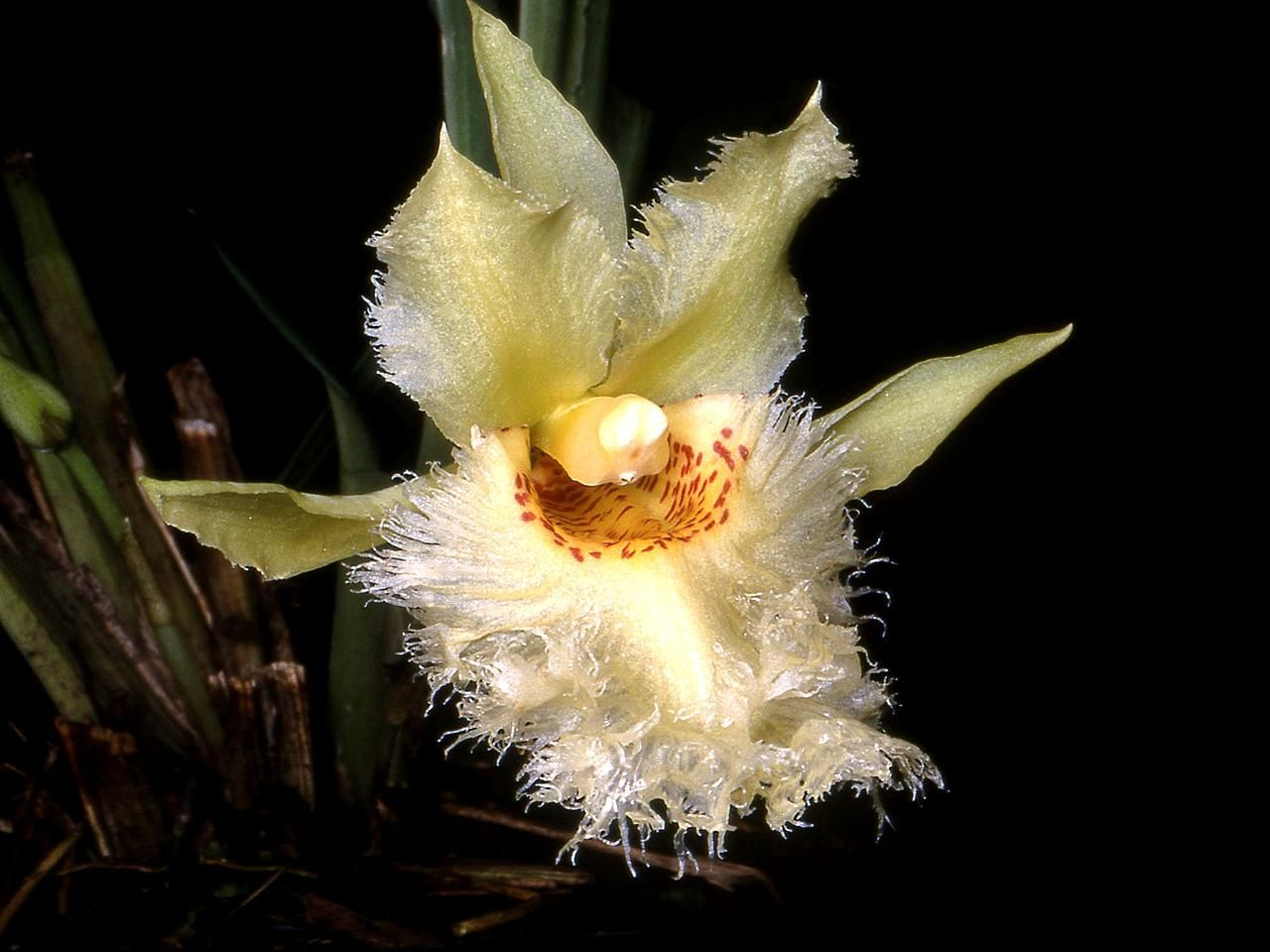
Chondroscaphe chestertonii flower

== James Veitch & Sons ==
Chesterton was born in Sandy, Bedfordshire in 1837. In 1861, he was working at Burghley House in Peterborough as a servant in the household of Brownlow Cecil, 2nd Marquess of Exeter.

Little else is known of Chesterton's early life until early 1870, when, as a valet to a gentleman who was travelling through South America, he wrote to Sir Harry Veitch from Chile stating that he had a passion for orchids and had gathered a substantial collection but needed advice on how to pack them in order to bring them back to England. Veitch replied immediately and arranged for Chesterton to meet one of his shipping agents in South America who would demonstrate the proper methods of packing the plants in order that they could be safely conveyed thousands of miles by sea, through various climates and greatly varying temperatures.

Nothing more was heard of Chesterton for some time, until, he arrived unannounced at Veitch Nurseries' Chelsea, London headquarters. Harry Veitch and John Heal, the head nurseryman, rushed to meet him and were presented with a collection of Orchids, "so carefully packed and well looked after, that they arrived in the best possible condition". Veitch immediately bought all of Chesterton's plants and offered him employment as a traveller in order to obtain more new finds as orchid mania was reaching its height. After a period spent studying and working in the Veitch orchid houses, he set off back to South America.

Chesterton was given specific instructions to locate and bring back to England "the much-talked-of and long-desired "scarlet Odontoglossum" (Miltoniopsis vexillaria) which several collectors, including David Bowman, had previously located but had been unable to send live samples back to England, with samples often arriving at Chelsea "dead or in a dying condition". Chesterton eventually located the plant in the northern Cordillera Occidental in Colombia. According to the account in Hortus Veitchii:

"Provided with but the scantiest information as to the native habitat, long kept secret and shrouded in mystery, Chesterton started, and not only succeeded in discovering the plant, but safely introduced it to Chelsea, where it flowered for the first time in 1873."

Chesterton continued to collect for Veitch over the next eight years and sent many new finds back to England, including some of the finest forms of Odontoglossum crispum, one of which was named "Chestertonii" by Reichenbach after its discoverer: some fine Masdevallias were also sent home, including the beautiful Masdevallia coccinea Harryana, which Chesterton found growing in abundance in the high Sierra Nevada del Cocuy in the Colombian Andes.

== Later career, death and epitaph ==
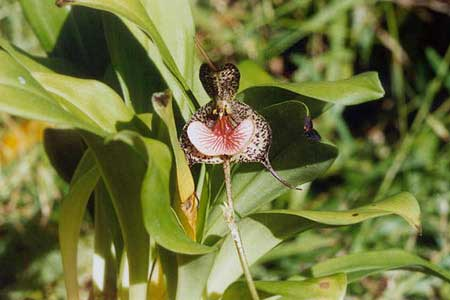
Frog's Skin (Dracula chestertonii)

Chesterton ended his employment with Veitch in 1878, and joined Veitch's principal rival Henry Sander, who sent him back to search for the "lost orchid", Cattleya labiata var. Vera. In 1879 he located Paphinia rugosa var. Sanderiana, which he named after his current employer. On his final trip, he discovered a species of "Dracula orchid", Dracula chestertonii, which was named after him.

He died at Puerto Berrío, in the Colombian department of Antioquia on 26 January 1883. His obituary in the Shipping List of 30 January 1883 stated:

"Mr. J. H. Chesterton, the botanist, died at Puerto Berrio on the 26th. He had been quite ill, but left the hotel 'San Nicholas,' thinking that he had sufficiently improved to be able to make his trip up the river. Sad mistake! He continued to decline, and was barely put on shore at Puerto Berrio where he died. Poor Chesterton's reckless spirit rendered him very efficient as a plant-collector."

The mania for orchids was now at its peak and after Chesterton, orchid collectors became less discriminating and tended to strip out the native habitat to prevent rival collectors from finding anything. The region where Chesterton had re-discovered Miltoniopsis vexillaria was later said to have been cleared as if by a forest fire. In 1887, the English traveller and orchid collector, Albert Millican, came across Chesterton's grave at Puerto Berrio, which he described in his memoirs as a

"rough cross of wood on the edge of the forest, on the higher bank of the river, (which) marks the last resting-place of Chesterton, the well-known orchid collector, who did such good service for the firm of James Veitch and Sons, long before the wholesale plunder and extermination of the plants brought about by modern collectors".

== Honours ==
Among the species and varieties of plant named after Chesterton are:

- Odontoglossum crispum var. Chestertonii
- Dracula chestertonii
- Chondroscaphe chestertonii
