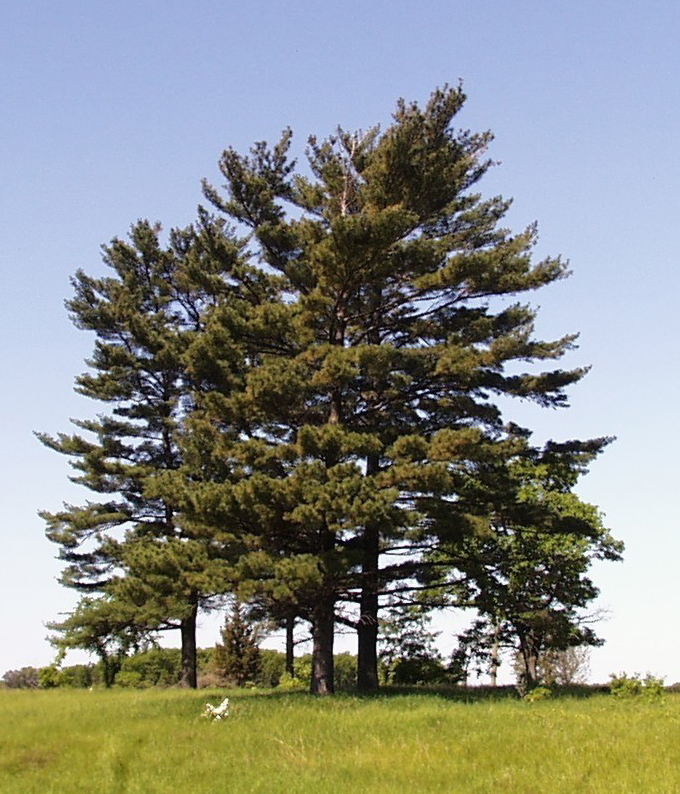
- Pinus strobus group

Conservation status
- Least Concern (IUCN 3.1)

- Secure (NatureServe)

Scientific classification
- Kingdom: Plantae
- Clade: Tracheophytes
- Clade: Gymnosperms
- Division: Pinophyta
- Class: Pinopsida
- Order: Pinales
- Family: Pinaceae
- Genus: Pinus
- Subgenus: P. subg. Strobus
- Section: P. sect. Quinquefoliae
- Subsection: P. subsect. Strobus
- Species: P. strobus

Binomial name
- Pinus strobus L.

= Pinus strobus =

Eastern white pine

Species of pine tree

Pinus strobus, commonly called the eastern white pine, northern white pine, white pine, Weymouth pine (British), and soft pine is a large pine native to eastern North America.

It occurs from Newfoundland, Canada, west through the Great Lakes region to southeastern Manitoba and Minnesota, United States, and south along the Appalachian Mountains and upper Piedmont to northernmost Georgia and, very rarely, in some of the higher elevations in northeastern Alabama. It is listed as rare or vulnerable in Iowa, Illinois, Indiana, and Kentucky, and as imperiled in Manitoba.

It is known as the "Weymouth pine" in the United Kingdom, after Captain George Weymouth of the British Royal Navy, who brought its seeds to England from Maine in 1605. The Haudenosaunee maintain the tree as the central symbol of their multinational confederation, calling it the "Tree of Peace".

== Description ==
The eastern white pine is an evergreen tree with a deep, asymmetrically cylindrical crown of outstretched thin branches, gently upward angled to nearly horizontal in well-separated annual tiers. Like most members of the white pine group, Pinus subgenus Strobus, the leaves ("needles") are evergreen and occur in fascicles (bundles) of five, or rarely three or four, with a deciduous sheath. The leaves are flexible, bluish-green, finely serrated, and 5–13 cm (2–5 in) long.

The seed cones are slender, 8–16 cm (3 1/4–6 1/4 in) long (rarely longer than that) and 4–5 cm (1 1/2–2 in) broad when open, and have scales with a rounded apex and slightly reflexed tip. They are often resinous. The seeds are 4–5 mm (5/32–3/16 in) long, with a slender 15–20 mm (5/8–3/4 in) wing, and are dispersed by wind. Cone production peaks every 3 to 5 years in mast seeding events.

Pollen and seed cones emerge separately with new growth. Pollen cones, or strobili, can be 5–15 mm long and straw-coloured, and are arrayed in a dense band at the base of a long shoot. Seed cones are mostly 8–20 cm long, found near the tips of the long shoots, and are green before maturity. Cone maturation occurs over 2 years and seeds fall in the spring following cone initiation.

The branches are spaced about every 18 inches on the trunk in whorls with five or six branches appearing like spokes on a wagon wheel. Eastern white pine is self-fertile, but seeds produced this way tend to result in weak, stunted, and malformed seedlings. Mature trees are often 200–250 years old; the oldest reliably aged white pine was a long-dead log in Ontario which was over 400 years old at death. Many have been aged at between 300 and 400 years, and there are claims of trees approaching 500 years old.

White pines will form strong, dominant roots that are similar to taproots then will later develop lateral roots.

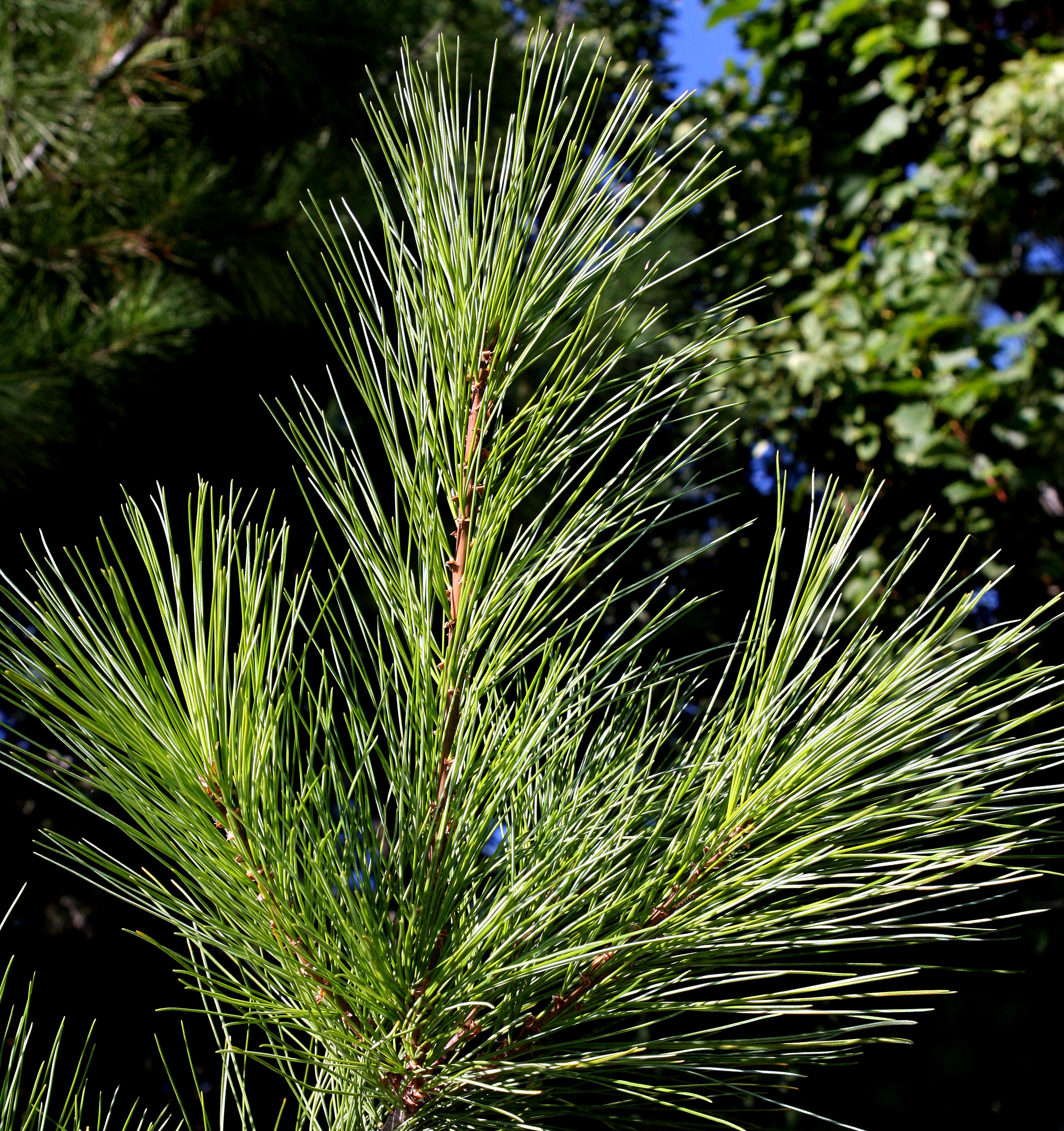
Leaves (needles) of new shoots in late summer

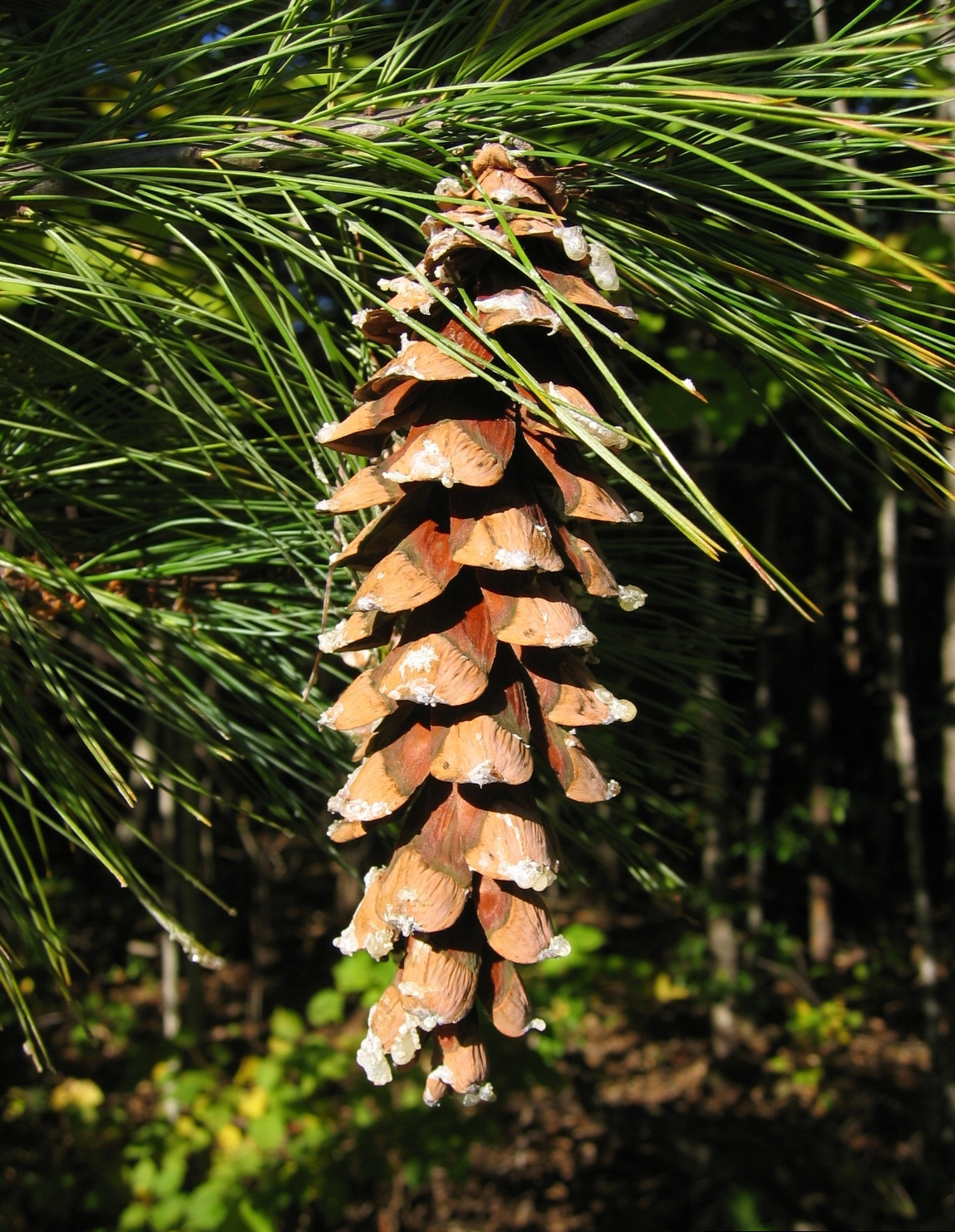
A mature seed cone that has opened and released its seeds

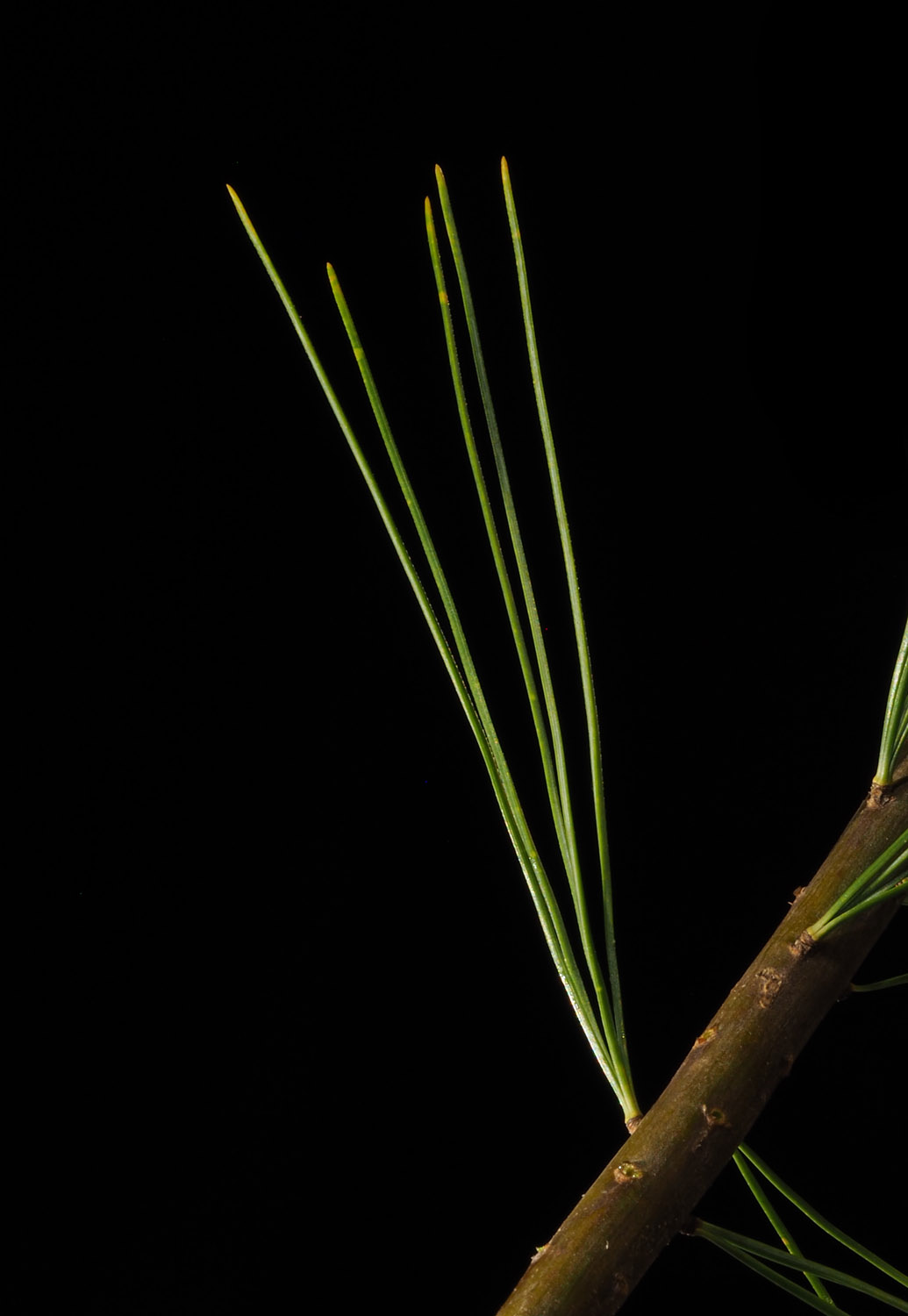
Fascicle with 5 needles

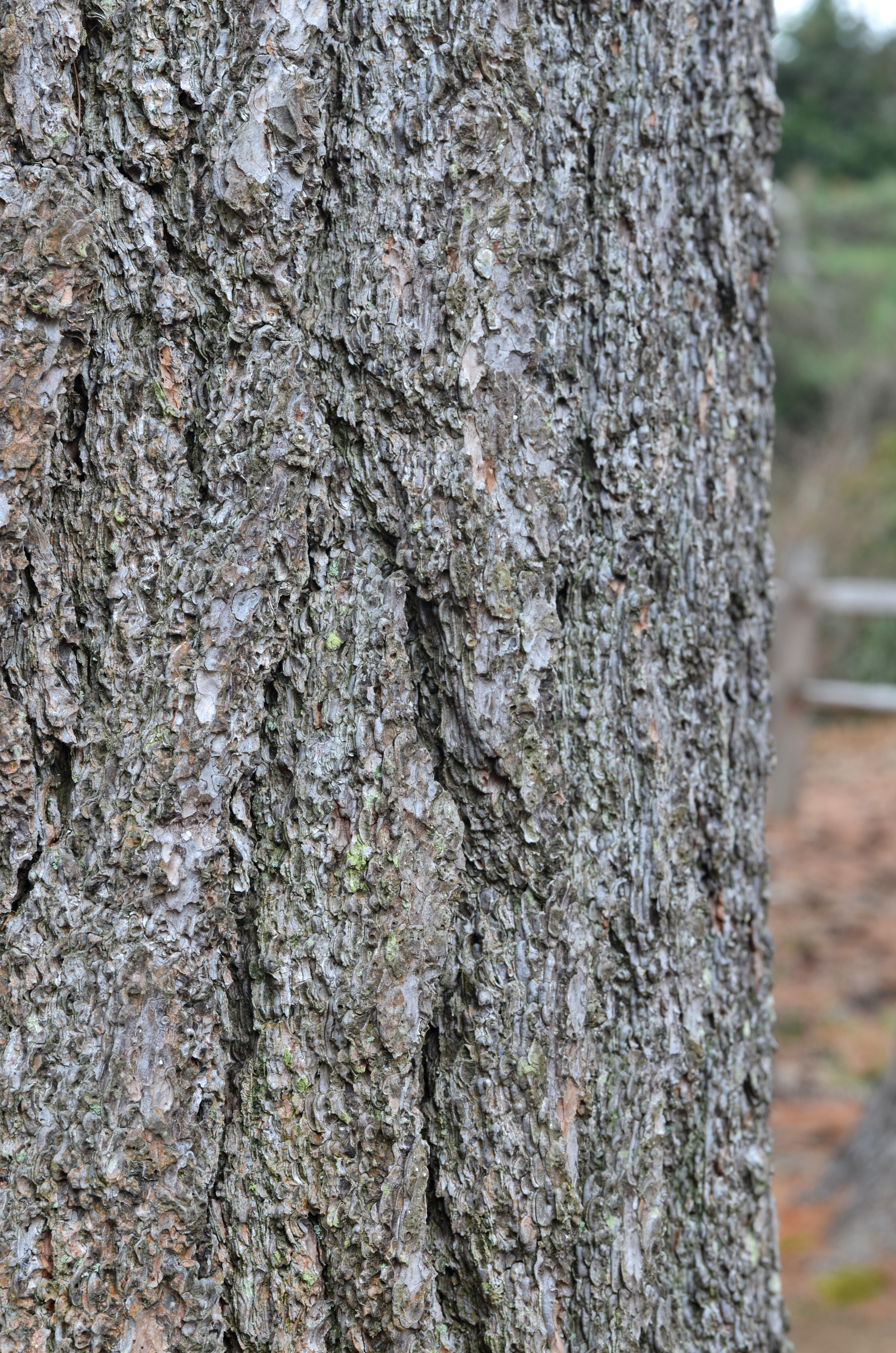
Closeup of bark

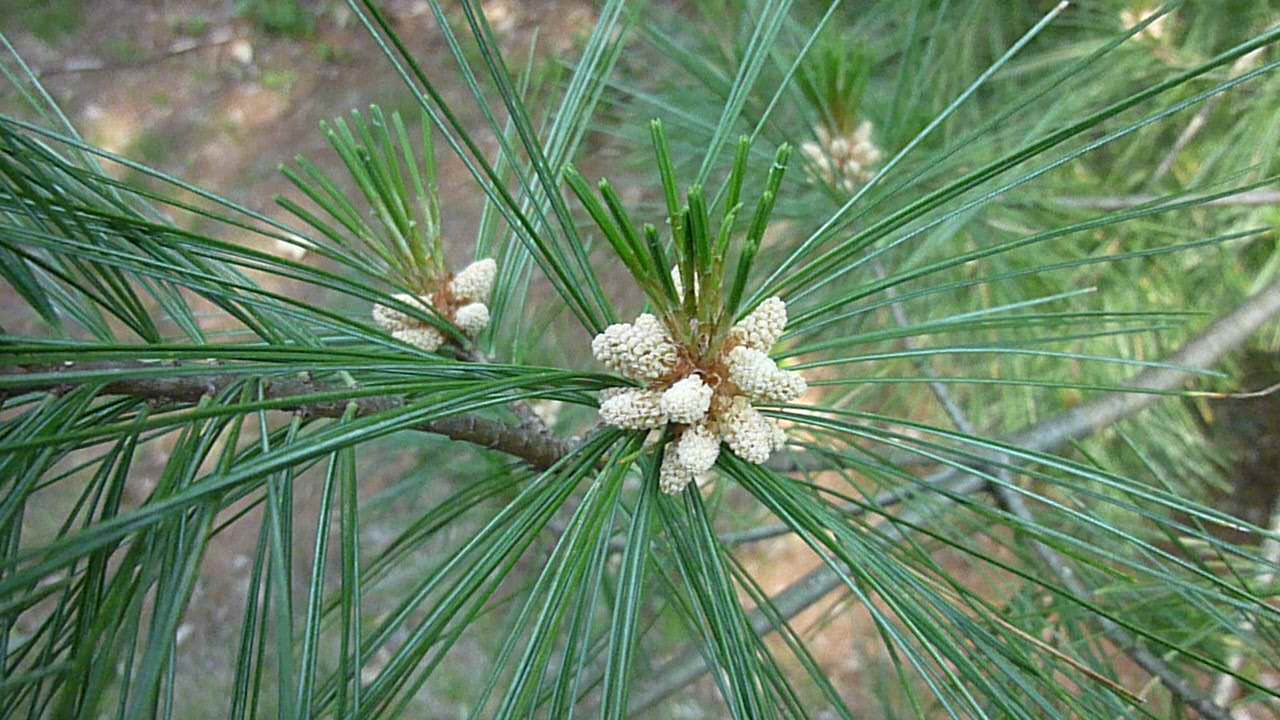
Pollen cones and young needles in late June

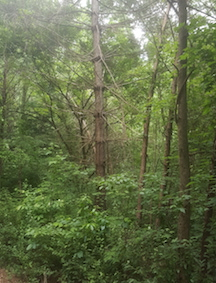
Branch pattern

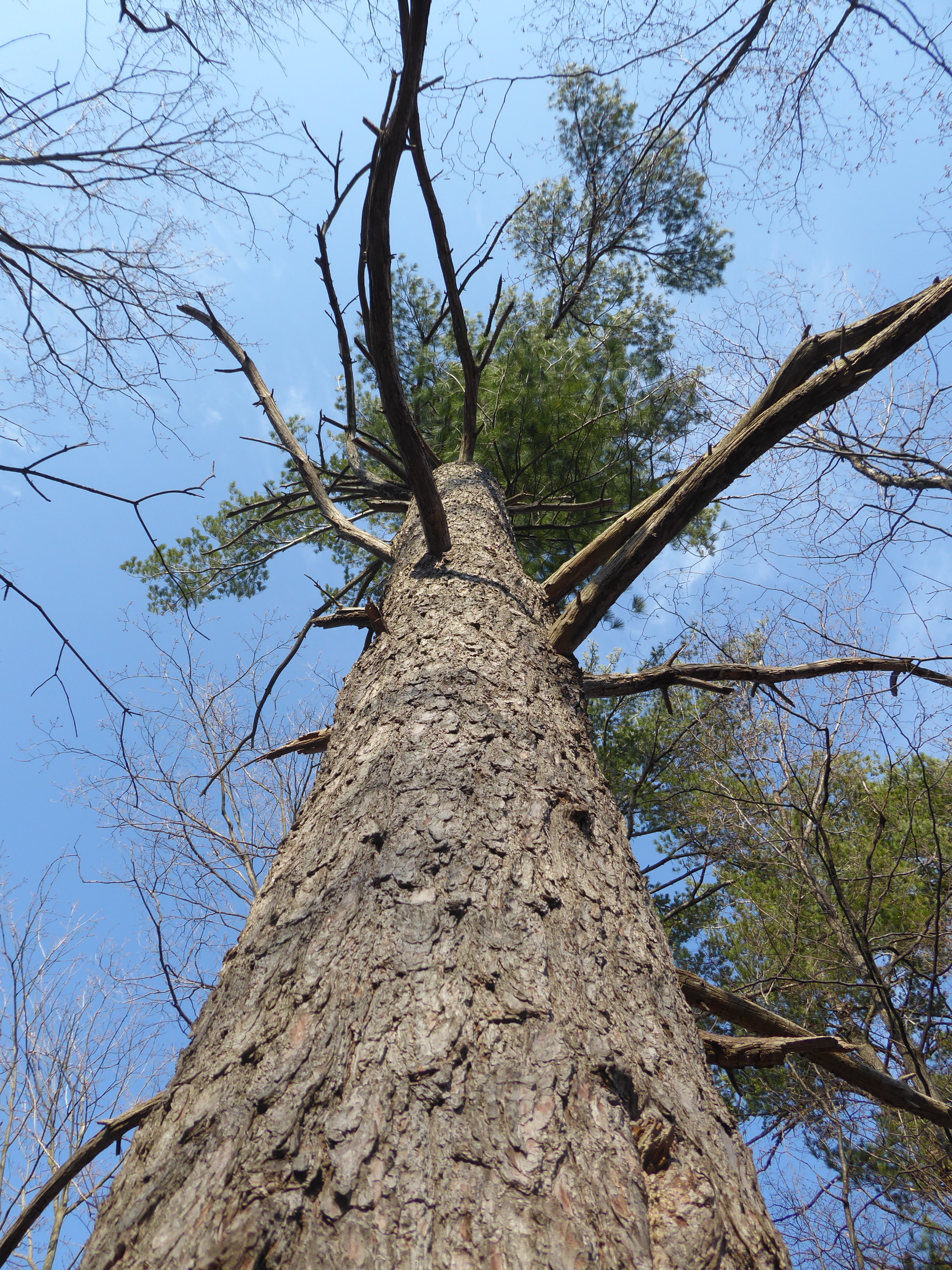
Large white pine in Southern Ontario, Canada

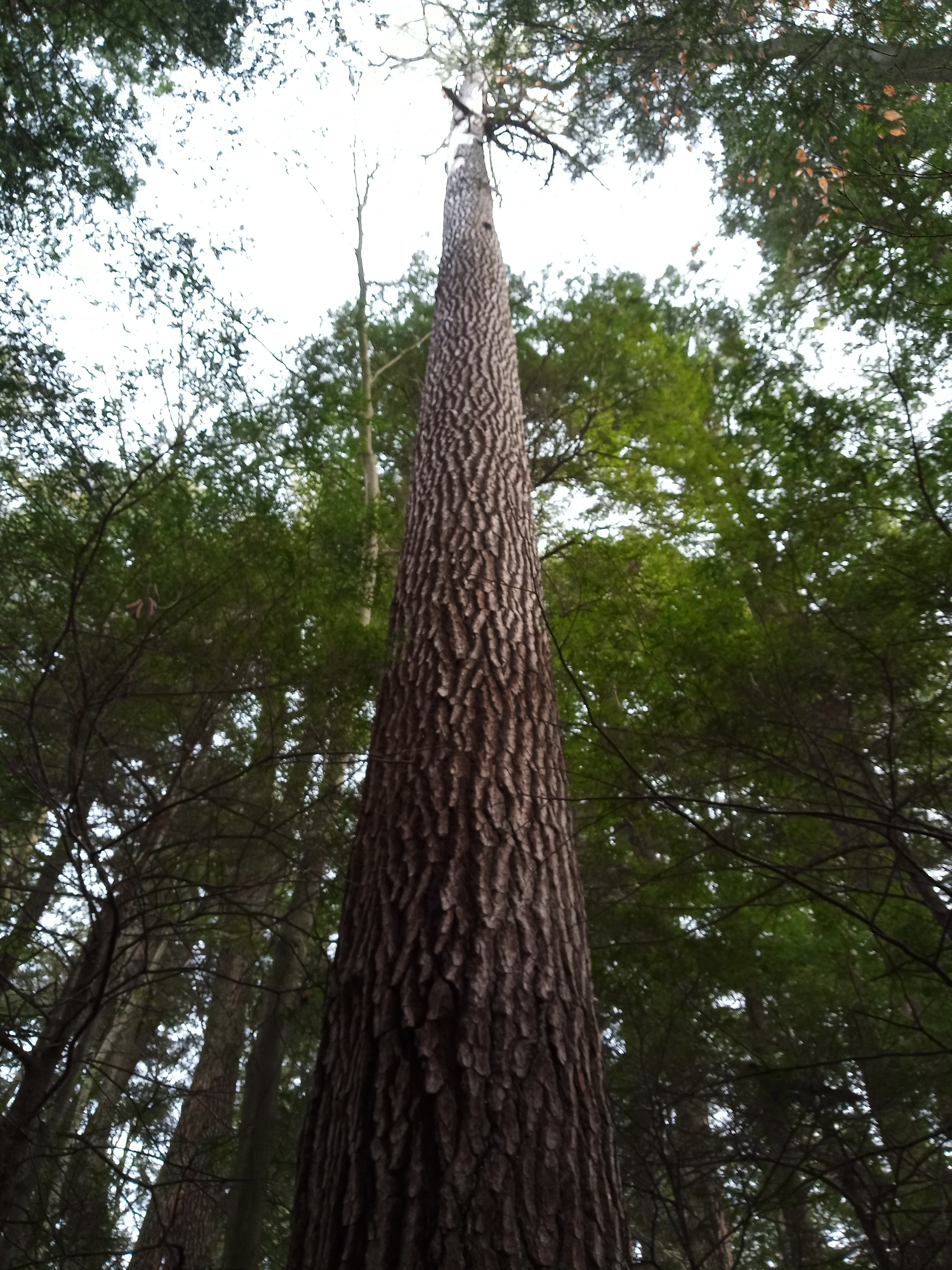
Mature white pine in Cook Forest State Park

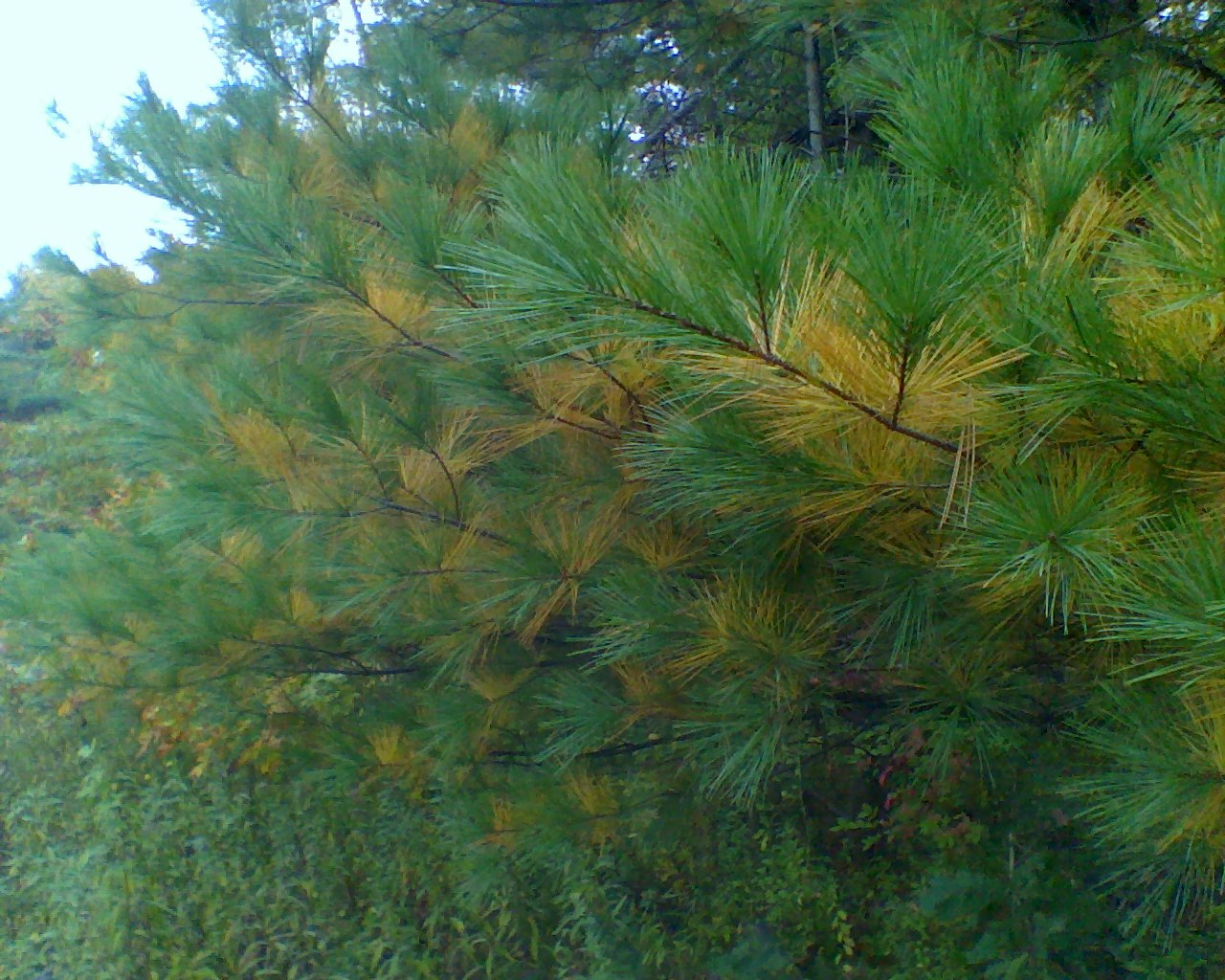
White pine boughs, showing annual yellowing and abscission of older foliage in fall, upstate New York

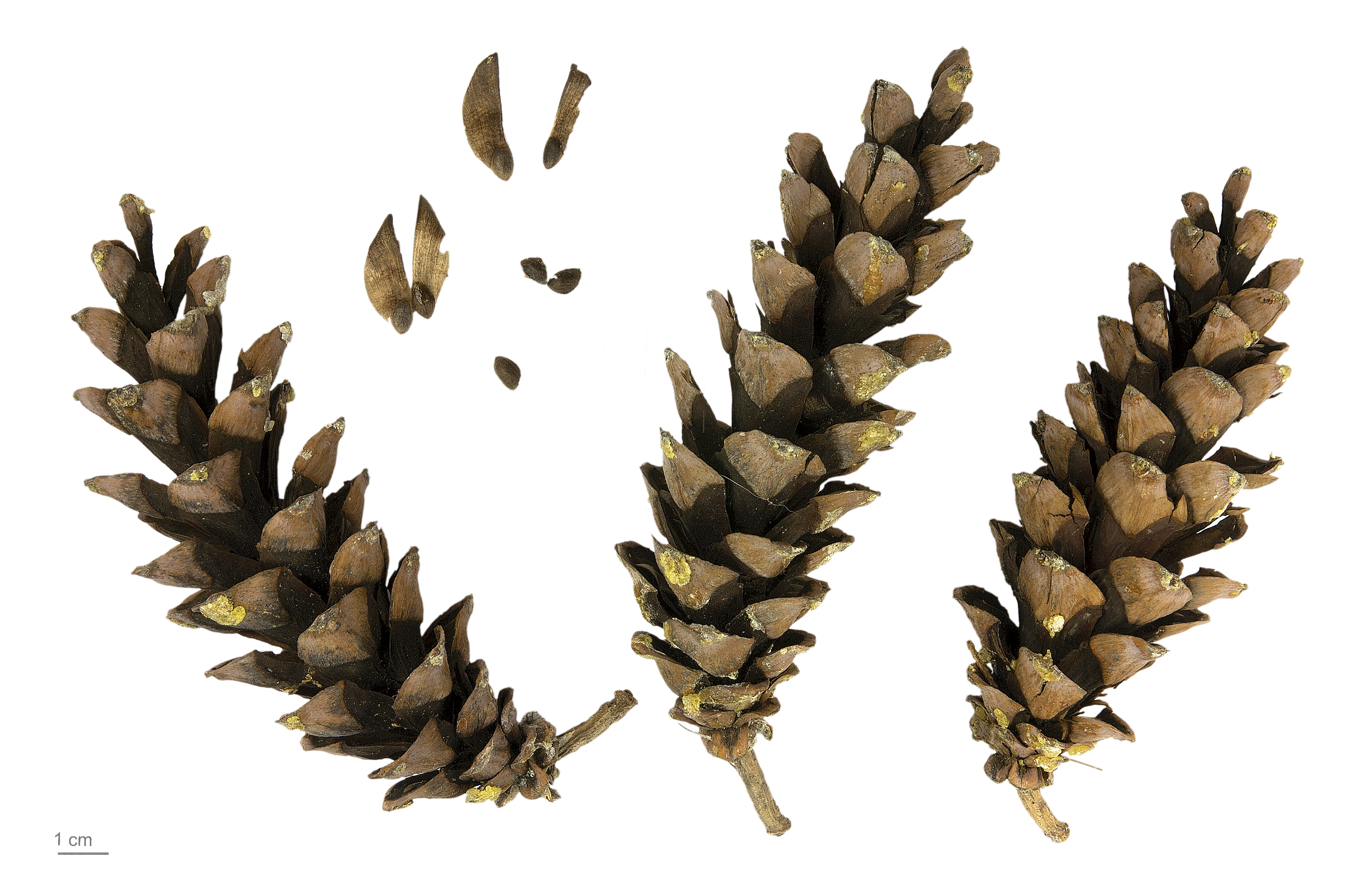
Cones and seeds

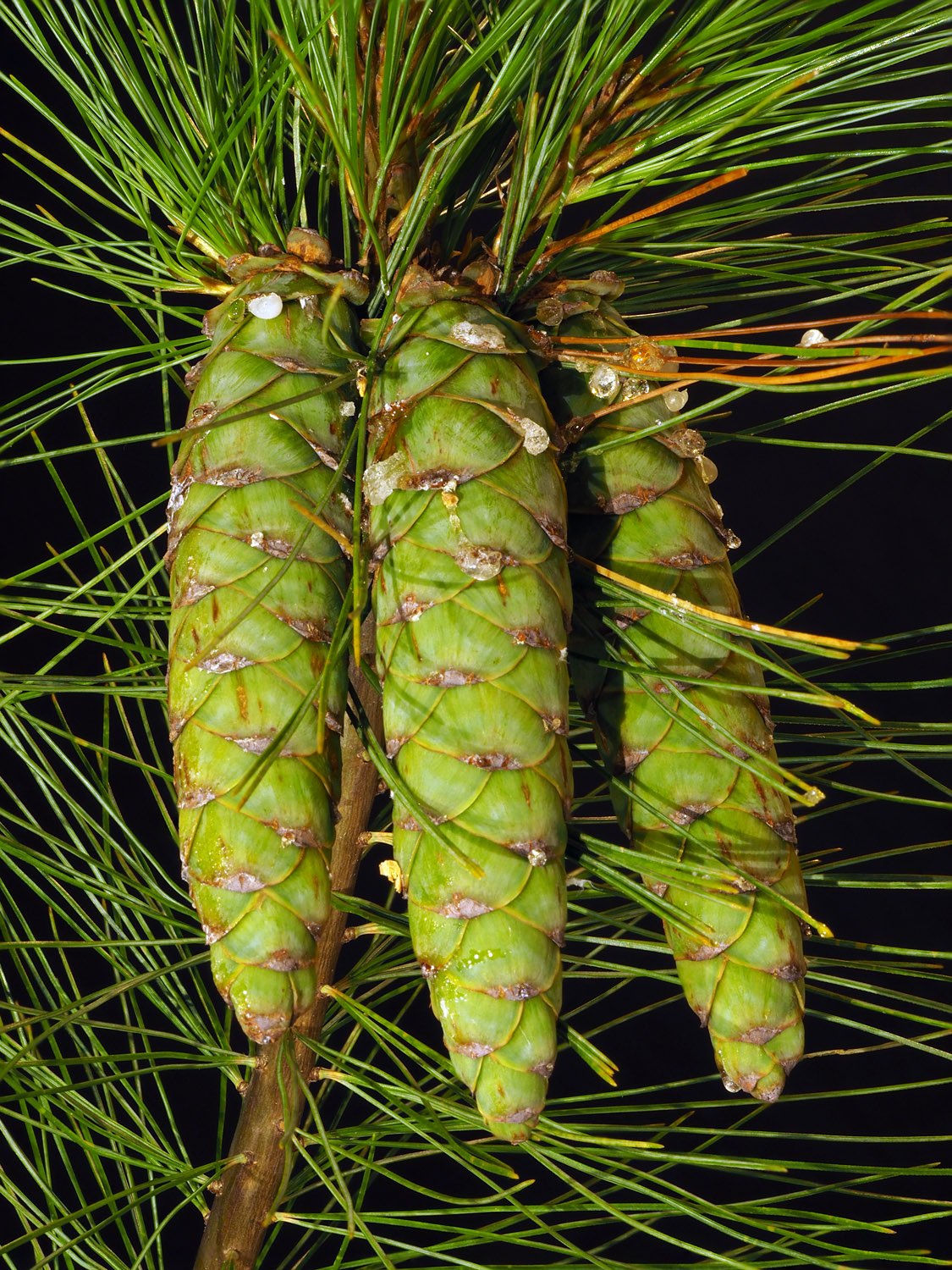
Developing female cones

=== Dimensions ===
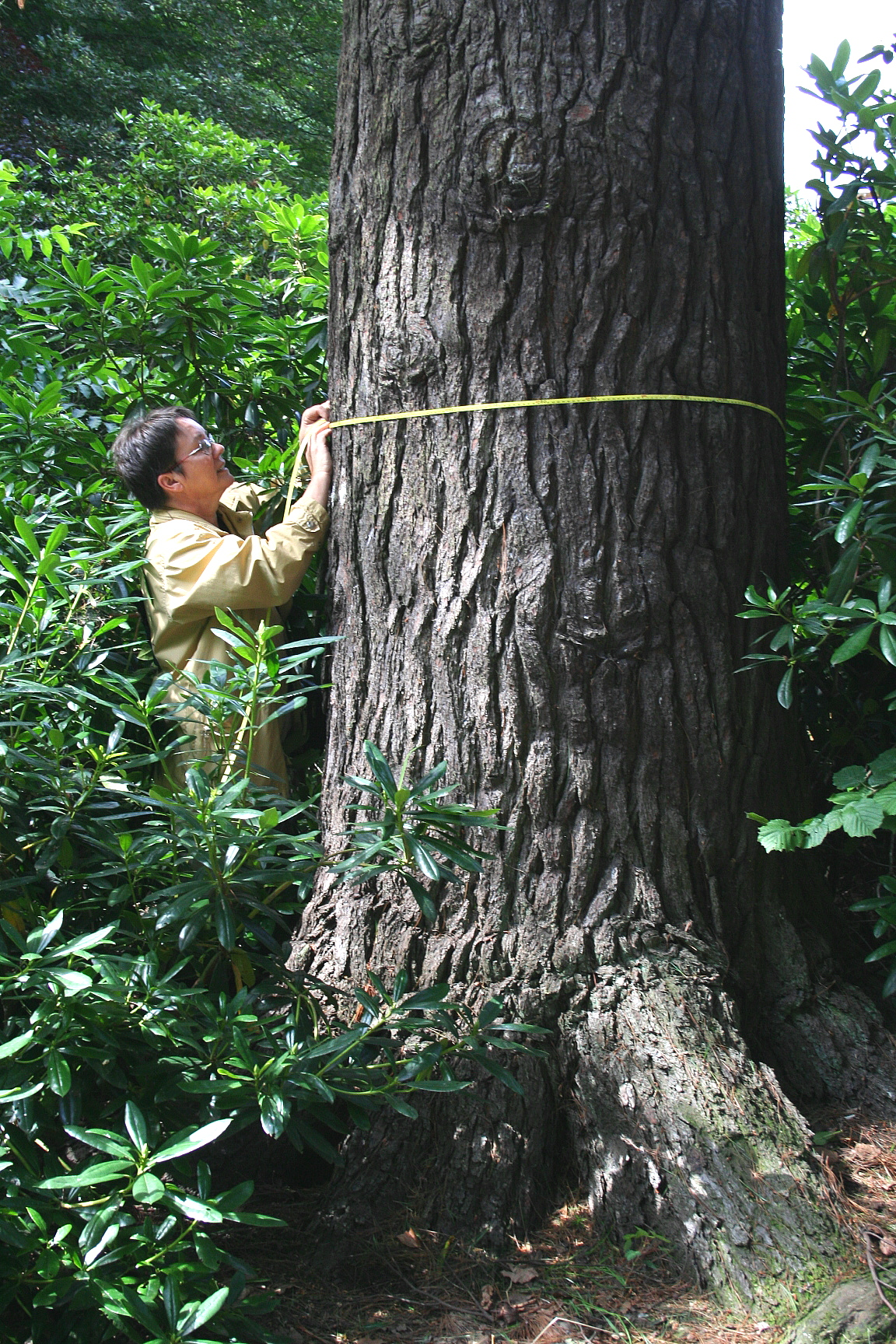
Measuring the circumference of an eastern white pine

The eastern white pine has been described as the tallest tree in eastern North America, perhaps sharing the prize with the deciduous tulip tree whose range overlaps with eastern white pine in its southern extent. In natural precolonial stands, the pine was reported to have grown as tall as 70 m (230 ft) or more. No means exist for accurately documenting the height of trees from these times, but eastern white pine may have reached this height on rare occasions. James Brown of Arniston, a forester and later Inspector of Woods and Forests, Port Elgin, Ontario, Canada wrote in 1882:

In its native habitats this pine grows to very large dimensions. We have measured many of them as they lay felled on the ground and taking a number of them we found the stems average 150 feet long by 2 feet 9 inches diameter at 5 feet up from the bottom. This may be taken as an average of the size of the trees as they stand in their native parts; but we have found many of them that measured 210 feet long with stems from 5 to 7 feet in diameter at 4 feet up from the bottom and on counting the annular layers on the stumps from which they were cut we found them to range between 350 and 425 which may be taken as representing the years of their age.

Even greater heights and diameters have been reported in numerous early town and county histories, lumber journals, and popular, but unverifiable, accounts such as Robert Pike's Tall Trees, Tough Men.

Total trunk volumes of the largest specimens are around 28 m^{3} (990 cu ft), with some past giants possibly reaching 37 to 40 m^{3} (1,300 to 1,400 cu ft). Photographic analysis of giants suggests volumes closer to 34 m^{3} (1,200 cu ft).

==== Height ====
P. strobus grows about 1 m (3.3 ft) annually between the ages of 15 and 45 years, with slower height increments before and after that age range. The tallest presently living specimens are 50–57.55 m (164 ft 1 in – 188 ft 10 in) tall, as determined by the Native Tree Society (NTS). Prior to their exploitation, it was common for white pines in northern Wisconsin to reach heights of over 61 m (200 ft).

The southern Appalachian Mountains have the most locations and the tallest trees in the present range of P. strobus. One survivor is a specimen known as the "Boogerman Pine" in the Cataloochee Valley of Great Smoky Mountains National Park. At 57.55 m (188 ft 10 in) tall, it is the tallest accurately measured tree in North America east of the Rocky Mountains, though this conflicts with citations for Liriodendron tulipifera. It has been climbed and measured by tape drop by the NTS. Before Hurricane Opal broke its top in October 1995, Boogerman Pine was 63 m (207 ft) tall, as determined by Will Blozan and Robert Leverett using ground-based measurements.

The tallest specimens in Hartwick Pines State Park in Michigan are 45–48 m (148–157 ft) tall.

In the northeastern US, eight sites in four states currently have trees over 48 m (157 ft) tall, as confirmed by the NTS. The Cook Forest State Park of Pennsylvania has the most numerous collection of 45 m (148 ft) eastern white pines in the Northeast, with 110 trees measuring that height or more. The park's "Longfellow Pine" is the tallest presently living eastern white pine in the Northeast, at 55.96 m (183 ft 7 in) tall, as determined by tape drop. The Mohawk Trail State Forest of Massachusetts has 83 trees measuring 45 m (148 ft) or more tall, of which six exceed 48.8 m (160 ft). The "Jake Swamp Tree" located there is 51.54 m (169 ft 1 in) tall. The NTS maintains precise measurements of it. A private property in Claremont, New Hampshire, has approximately 60 specimens that are at least 45 m (148 ft), with the tallest being 50.63 m (166.1 ft).

==== Diameter ====
Diameters of the larger pines range from 1.0–1.6 m (3 ft 3 in – 5 ft 3 in), which translates to a circumference (girth) range of 3.1–5.0 m (10 ft 2 in – 16 ft 5 in). However, single-trunked white pines in both the Northeast and Southeast with diameters over 1.45 m (4 ft 9 in) are exceedingly rare. Notable big pine sites of 40 ha (99 acres) or less often have no more than two or three trees in the 1.2- to 1.4-m-diameter class. Common diameter of 2–3 feet.

Unconfirmed reports from the colonial era gave diameters of virgin white pines of up to 2.4 m (8 ft).

== Distribution and habitat ==
P. strobus occurs from Newfoundland, Canada, west through the Great Lakes region to southeastern Manitoba and Minnesota, United States, and south along the Appalachian Mountains and upper Piedmont to northernmost Georgia and, very rarely, in some of the higher elevations in northeastern Alabama.

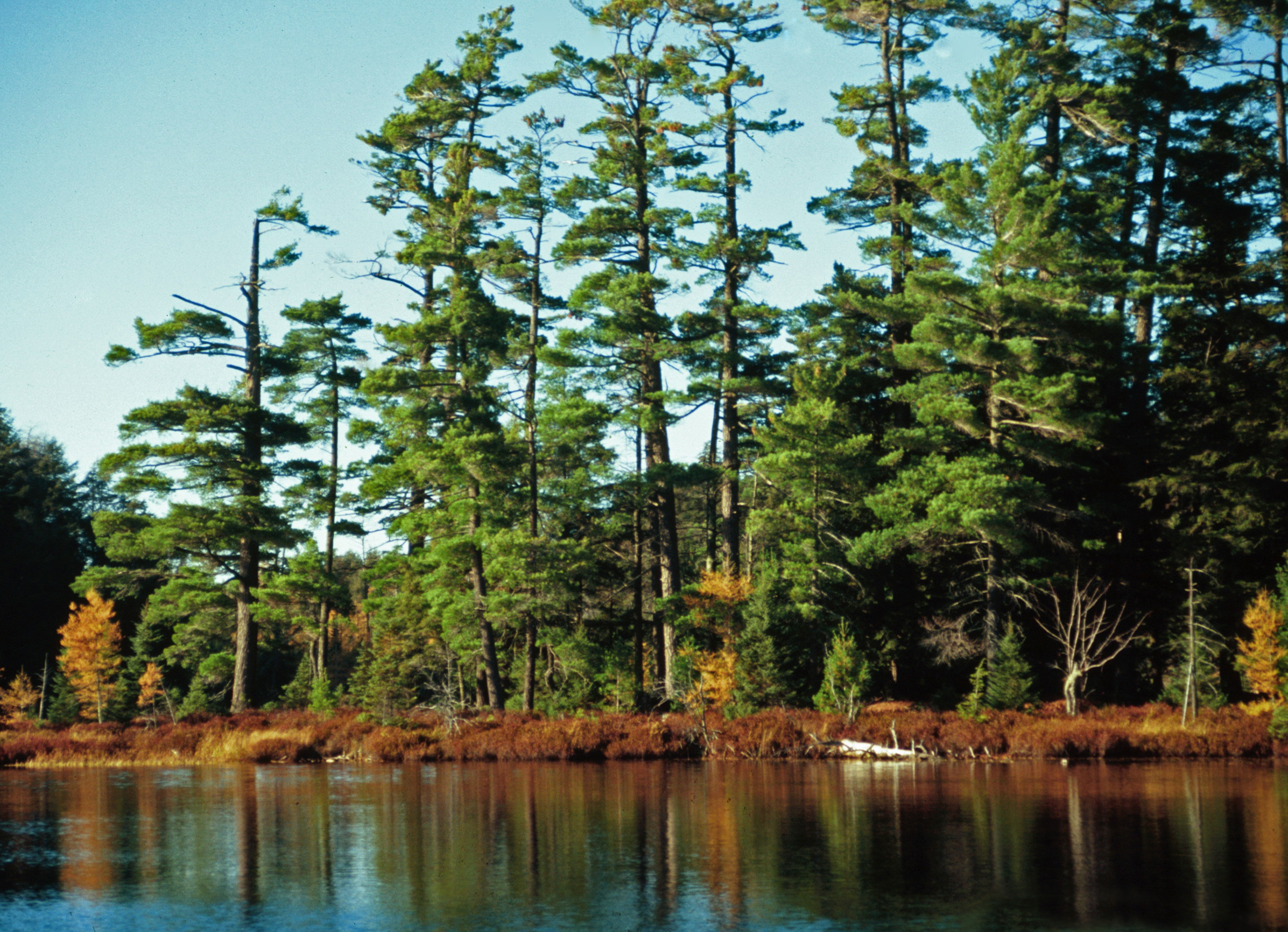
Native eastern white pine, Sylvania Wilderness, Michigan

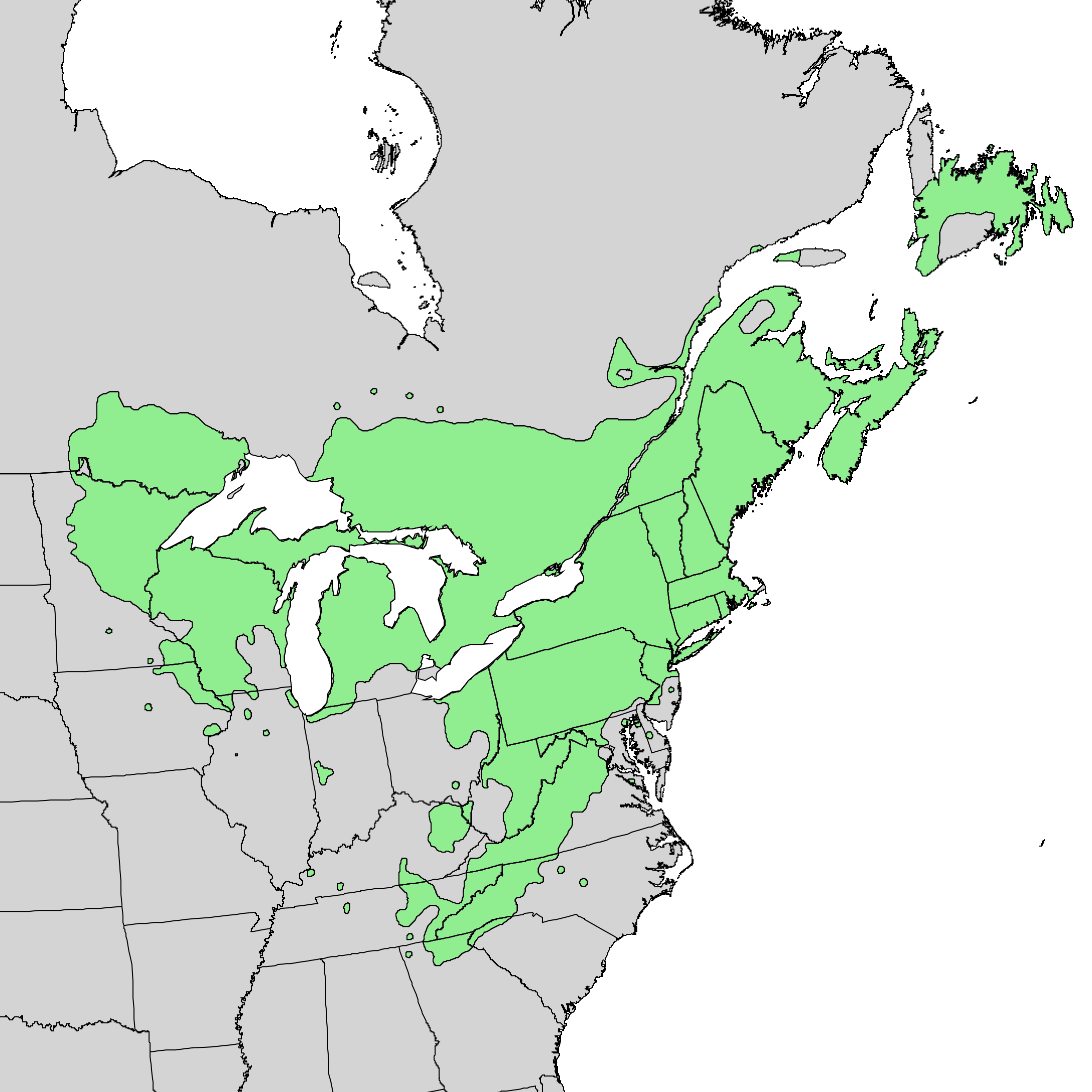
Partial distribution map of P. strobus in North America

It is widely distributed across the Great Lakes region, New England and Canada's Maritime Provinces, and along most of the Appalachian Mountain ranges. It is a irregular but frequently important component of cool-temperate, hemiboreal and southern-mid boreal forests of eastern North America. It achieves highest abundance on well-drained or sandy soils and in humid climates, but can also grow in boggy areas and rocky highlands.

Studies of both population genetics and of fossil pollen and needles in sedimentary deposits suggest that white pine's distribution at the Last Glacial Maximum (19,000 to 26,000 years ago) was limited to a single 'refugium' on the coastal plain of the southeastern US, an area where it no longer occurs. Due to lowered sea level at this time, the coastline was ca. 100 km east of current locations, and the refugium likely extended into this 'revealed' land.

Eastern white pine may have been abundant in areas throughout north-central and northeastern North America, but early logging and extensive post-agricultural regeneration make it difficult to reconstruct the species' importance accurately.

Old-growth forests, or virgin stands, have been reduced to perhaps <1% of their original extent. Significant protected stands of old forests are in Great Smoky Mountains National Park, Algonquin Provincial Park, Quetico Provincial Park, Algoma Highlands in Ontario, and Sainte-Marguerite River Old Forest in Quebec, Canada; Estivant Pines, Huron Mountains, Porcupine Mountains State Park, and Sylvania Wilderness Area in the Upper Peninsula of Michigan, United States; Hartwick Pines State Park in the Lower Peninsula of Michigan; Menominee Indian Reservation in Wisconsin; Lost 40 Scientific and Natural Area (SNA), Boundary Waters Canoe Area Wilderness in Minnesota; White Pines State Park, Illinois; Cook Forest State Park, Hearts Content Scenic Area, Anders Run Natural Area in Pennsylvania; and the Linville Gorge Wilderness in North Carolina, United States.

Small unlogged groves or individual specimens of particularly large and old eastern white pines are found across the range of the species in the US, including in Ordway Grove, Maine; Ice Glen, Massachusetts; and Adirondack Park, New York. However, many sites with conspicuously large specimens represent advanced old-field ecological succession. The tall stands in Mohawk Trail State Forest and William Cullen Bryant Homestead in Massachusetts are examples.

As an introduced species, P. strobus is now naturalizing in the Outer Western Carpathians subdivision of the Carpathian Mountains in Czech Republic and southern Poland. It has spread from specimens planted as ornamental trees.

== Ecology ==
In mixed forests, white pine can occur as an emergent 'super-canopy' species over much of its range; it can be taller than most co-occurring hardwoods. It provides food and shelter for numerous forest birds, such as the red crossbill, and small mammals such as squirrels. Cottontail, snowshoe rabbits, and porcupines can eat the bark. Red squirrels can eat the cones by extracting the seeds. Seeds are eaten by crossbills, pine siskin, and white tailed deer.

An illustration dated 1902, showing a variety of insect pests affecting eastern white pine

Because the eastern white pine tree is somewhat resistant to fire, mature survivors are able to reseed burned areas. In pure stands, mature trees usually have no branches on the lower half of their trunks. The white pine weevil (Pissodes strobi) and white pine blister rust (Cronartium ribicola), an introduced fungus, can damage or kill these trees.

=== Blister rust ===
Mortality from white pine blister rust in mature pine groves was often 50–80% during the early 20th century. The fungus must spend part of its lifecycle on alternate hosts of the genus Ribes, the native gooseberry or wild currant. Foresters proposed that if all the alternate host plants were removed, white pine blister rust might be eliminated. A very determined campaign was mounted, and all land owners in commercial pine-growing regions were encouraged to uproot and kill all native gooseberry and wild currant plants. The ramifications for wildlife and habitat ecology were of less concern at the time than timber-industry protection.

Today, native wild currants are relatively rare plants in New England, and planting wild currants or wild gooseberries is strongly discouraged, or even illegal in some jurisdictions. As an alternative, new strains of commercial currants have been developed that are highly resistant to white pine blister rust. Mortality in white pines from rust is only about 3% today.

== Conservation ==
Old white pines are treasured in the US. An American National Natural Landmark, Cook Forest State Park in Pennsylvania, contains the tallest known tree in the Northeastern US, a white pine named Longfellow Pine. Some white pines in Wisconsin are over 200 years old. Although widely planted as a landscape tree in the Midwestern states, native white pine is listed as "rare or uncommon" in Indiana. It is listed as rare or vulnerable (S3) in Iowa, Illinois, Indiana, and Kentucky, and as imperiled in Manitoba.

== Cultivation ==
P. strobus is cultivated by plant nurseries as an ornamental tree, for planting in gardens and parks. The species is low-maintenance and rapid-growing as a specimen tree. With regular shearing, it can also be trained as a hedge. Some cultivars are used in bonsai.

=== Cultivars ===
Cultivars have been selected for small to dwarf mature forms, and foliage color characteristics. They include:

- P. strobus Nana group – 91 cm (3 ft) tall by 1.2 m (4 ft) wide MBG: Pinus strobus (Nana Group)
  - P. strobus 'Macopin' – 30 to 91 cm (1 to 3 ft) tall & wide. MBG:Pinus strobus 'Macopin'
  - P. strobus 'Paul Waxman' – 61 to 152 cm (2 to 5 ft) tall & wide. MBG: Pinus strobus 'Paul Waxman'
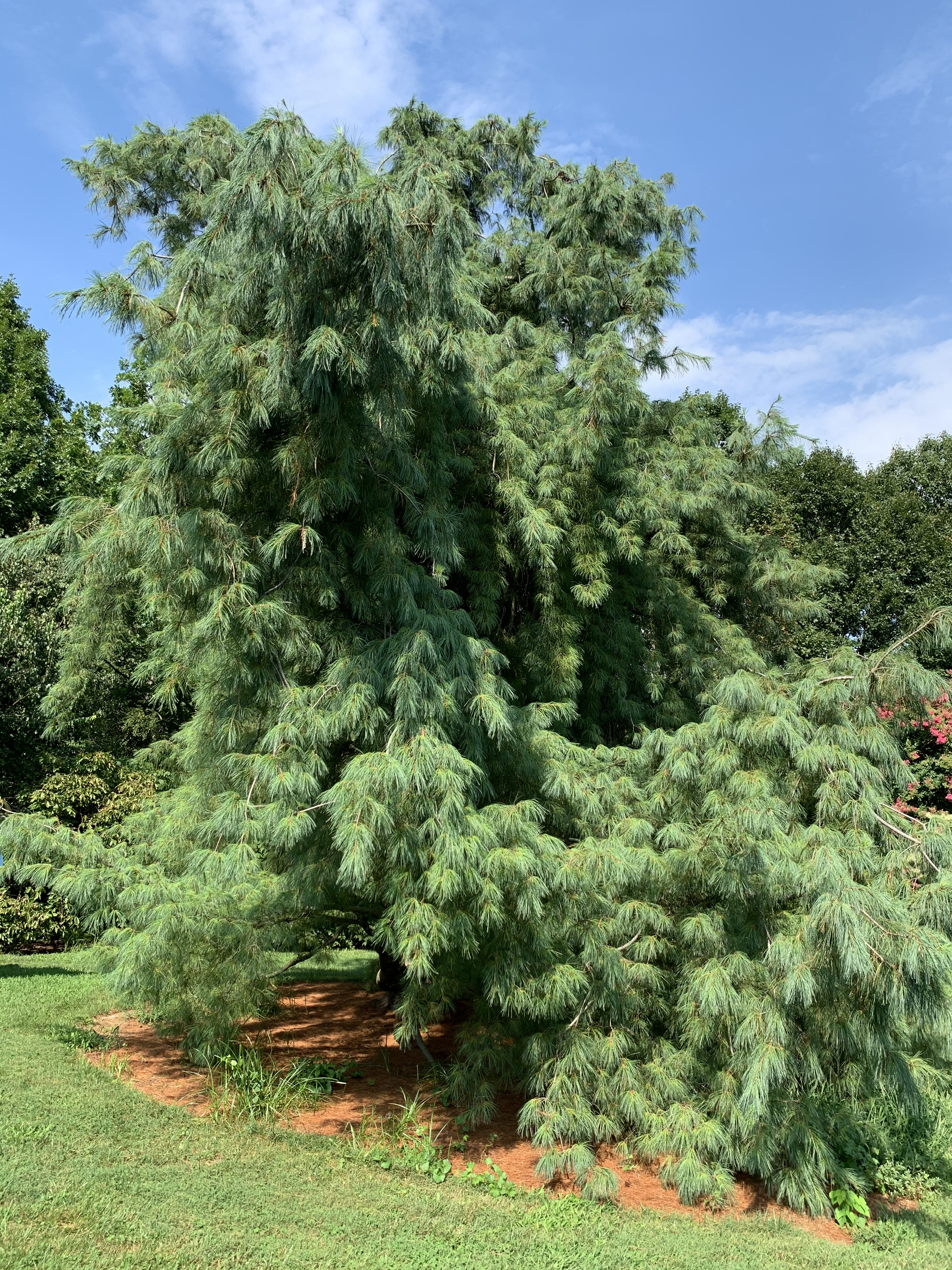
    Pinus strobus 'Pendula'
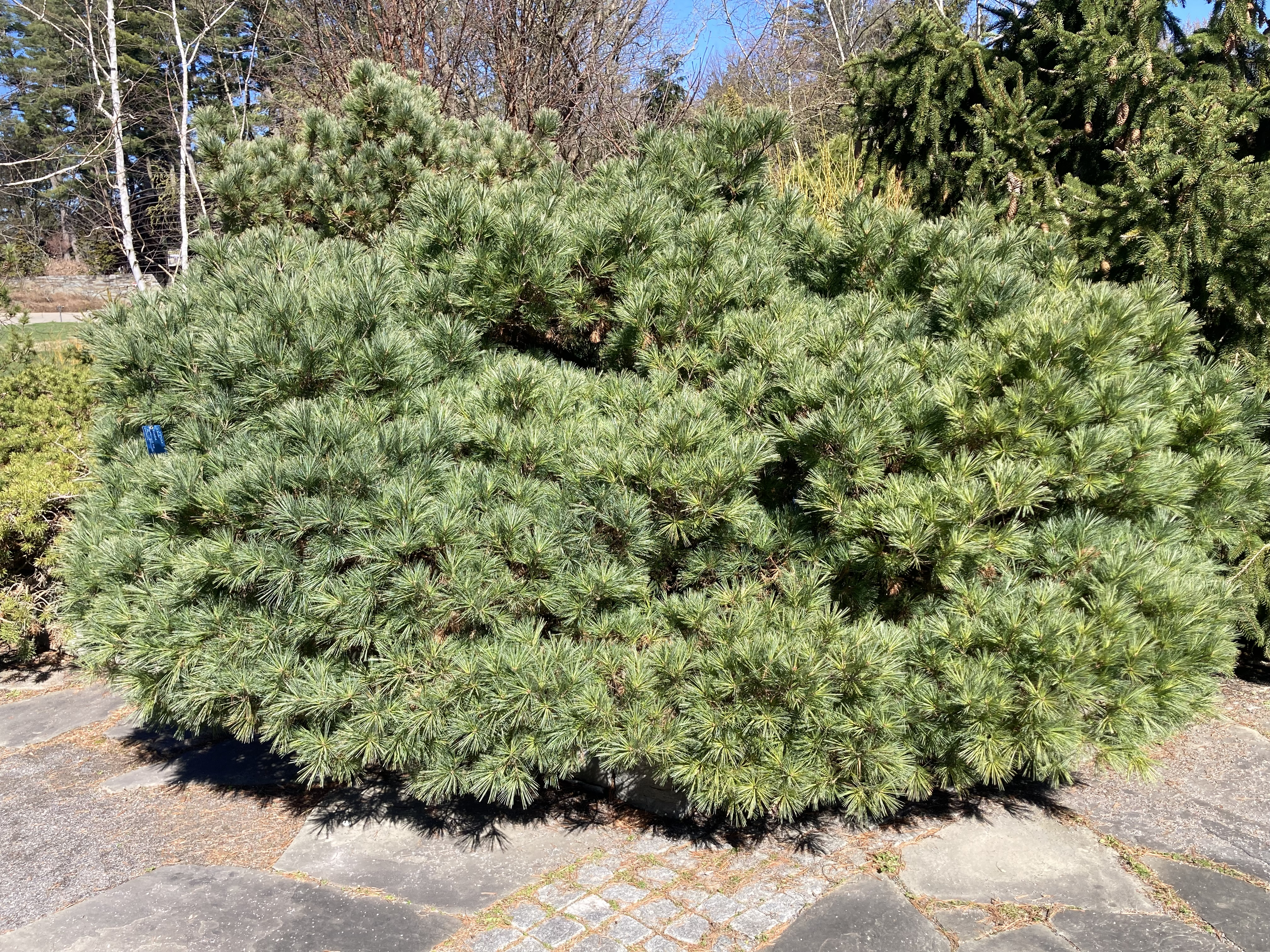
    Pinus strobus 'Pigmaea'
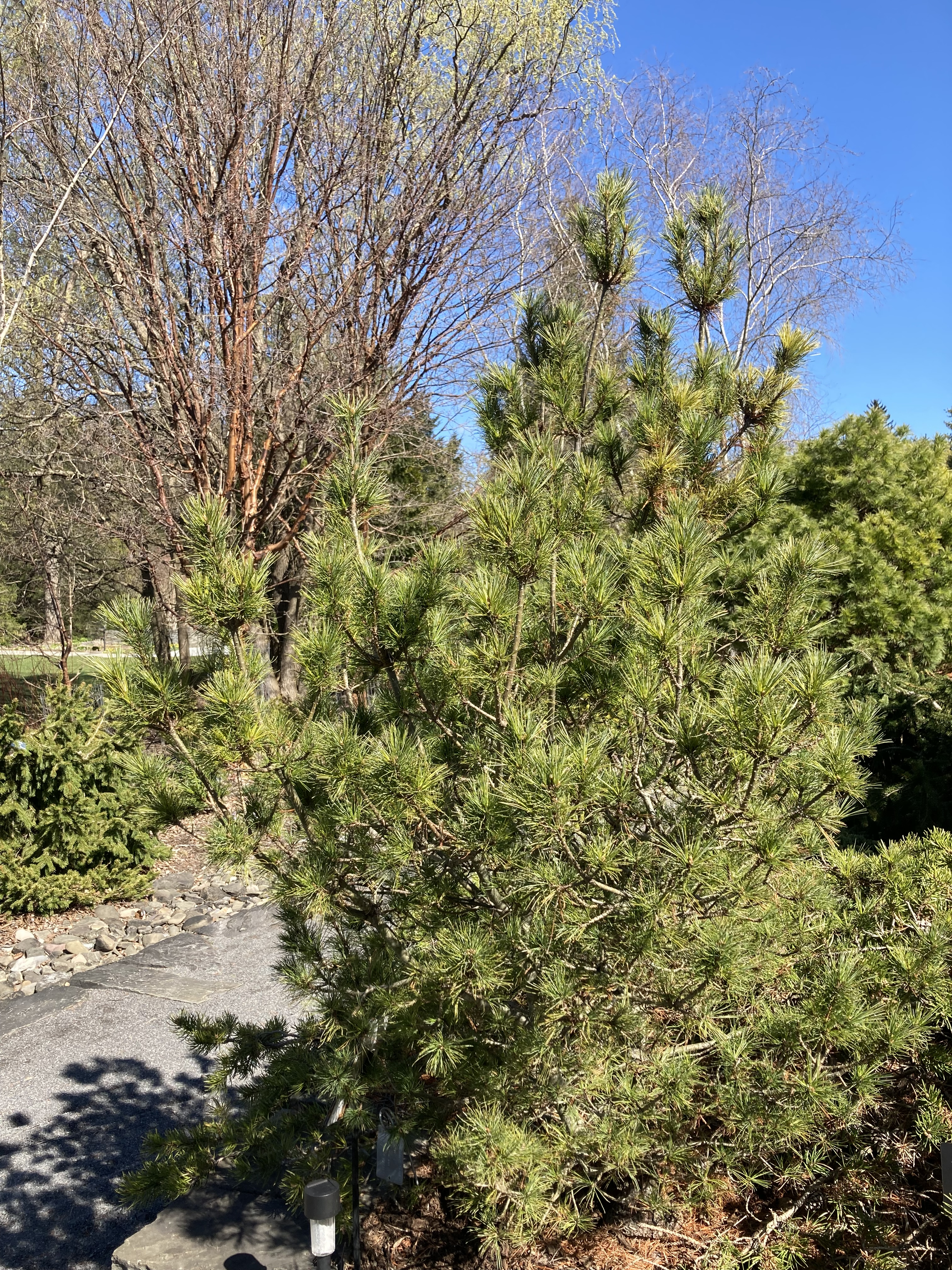
    Pinus strobus 'Diggy'

=== Christmas trees ===
Smaller specimens are popular as live Christmas trees. Eastern white pines are noted for holding their needles well, even long after being harvested. They also are well suited for people with allergies, as they give little to no aroma. A standard 1.8-meter (6 ft) tree takes around 6 to 8 years to grow in ideal conditions. Sheared varieties are usually desired because of their stereotypical Christmas tree conical shape, as naturally grown ones can be sparse, or grow bushy in texture. The branches of the eastern white pine are also widely used in making holiday wreaths and garlands because of their soft, feathery needles.

=== Water filtration ===
White pine xylem has been used as a filter to clean certain bacteria from contaminated water. Hemacytometer tests revealed that at least 99.9% of bacteria tested were rejected after being passed through white pine xylem.

== Native American traditional uses ==
The name "Adirondack", a Mohawk word that means tree-eater, referred to their neighbors (more commonly known as the Algonquians) who collected the inner bark of P. strobus, Picea rubens, and others during times of winter starvation. The white, soft inner bark (cambial layer) was carefully separated from the hard, dark brown bark and dried. When pounded, this product can be used as flour or added to stretch other starchy products.

The young staminate cones were stewed with meat by the Ojibwe, and were said to be sweet and not pitchy. In addition, the seeds are sweet and nutritious.

Pine resin (sap) has been used by various tribes to waterproof baskets, pails, and boats. The Ojibwe also used pine resin to successfully treat infections.

== Historical uses ==
=== Lumber ===
In the 19th century, the harvesting of Midwestern white pine forests played a major role in America's westward expansion through the Great Plains. A quarter-million white pines were harvested and sent to lumber yards in Chicago in a single year.

The white pine had aesthetic appeal to contemporary naturalists such as Henry David Thoreau ("There is no finer tree.") Beyond that, it had commercial applications. It was considered "the most sought and most widely utilized of the various forest growths of the northwest." Descriptions of its uses are quoted below from a 19th-century source:

Being of a soft texture and easily worked, taking paint better than almost any other variety of wood, it has been found adaptable to all the uses demanded in the building art, from the manufacture of packing cases to the bearing timber and finer finish of a dwelling. Of light weight, it has borne transportation to the farms of the west, where it is used for building purposes in dwellings, barns, and corn cribs, while as a fencing material it has no superior. Aside from those conditions which demand a dense strong timber, such as ship-building or in wagon-making, white pine has been found adaptable to all the economic uses in which lumber is required, not excluding its use in coarser articles of furniture. No wood has found greater favor or entered more fully into supplying all those wants of man which could be found in the forest growths.

The seeds were imported from Maine to England in 1605 by Captain George Weymouth, for whom it is known as "Weymouth pine" in the United Kingdom. Weymouth planted it for a timber crop, but had little success because of white pine blister rust disease.

after Captain George Weymouth of the British Royal Navy, who brought its seeds to England from Maine in .

Old-growth pine in the Americas, of various Pinus species, was a highly desired wood since huge, knot-free boards were the rule rather than the exception. Pine was common and easy to cut, thus many colonial homes used pine for paneling, floors, and furniture. Pine was also a favorite tree of loggers, since pine logs can still be processed in a lumber mill a year or more after being cut down. In contrast, most hardwood trees such as cherry, maple, oak, and ash must be cut into 1" thick boards immediately after felling, or else large cracks will develop in the trunk which can render the wood worthless.

Although eastern white pine was frequently used for flooring in buildings constructed before the US Civil War, the wood is soft and tends to cup over time with wear. George Washington opted for the much harder southern yellow pine at Mount Vernon, instead.

=== Mast pines ===
During the 17th and 18th centuries, tall white pines in the Thirteen Colonies became known as "mast pines". Marked by agents of the Crown with the broad arrow, a mast pine was reserved for the British Royal Navy. Special barge-like vessels were built to ship tall white pines to England. The wood was often squared to better fit in the holds of these ships. A 30-metre (100 ft) mast was about 0.91 m × 0.91 m (3 ft × 3 ft) at the butt and 0.61 m × 0.61 m (2 ft × 2 ft) at the top, while a 37-metre (120 ft) mast was 1.2 m × 1.2 m (4 ft × 4 ft) by 0.76 m (30 in) on its ends.

By 1719, Portsmouth, New Hampshire, had become the hub of pine logging and shipping. Portsmouth shipped 199 masts to England that year. In all, about 4500 masts were sent to England.

The eastern white pine played a significant role in the events leading to the American Revolution. Marking of large white pines by the Crown had become controversial in the colonies by the first third of the 18th century. In 1734, the King's men were assaulted and beaten in Exeter, New Hampshire, in what was to be called the Mast Tree Riot. Colonel David Dunbar had been in the town investigating a stock pile of white pine in a pond and the ownership of the local timber mill before caning two townspeople. In 1772, the sheriff of Hillsborough County, New Hampshire, was sent to the town of Weare to arrest mill owners for the illegal possession of large white pines. That night, as the sheriff slept at the Pine Tree Tavern, he was attacked and nearly killed by an angry mob of colonists. This act of rebellion, later to become known as the Pine Tree Riot, may have fueled the Boston Tea Party in 1773.

After the Revolutionary War, the fledgling United States used large white pines to build out its own navy. The masts of the USS Constitution were originally made of eastern white pine. The original masts were single trees, but were later replaced by laminated spars to better withstand cannonballs.

In colonial times, an unusually large, lone, white pine was found in coastal South Carolina along the Black River, far east of its southernmost normal range. The king's mark was carved into it, giving rise to the town of Kingstree.

Eastern white pine is now widely grown in plantation forestry within its native area.

== Contemporary uses ==
=== Lumber ===
Board of Pinus strobus

==== Timber framing ====
Eastern white pine has often been used for timber frames, and is available in large sizes. Eastern white pine timbers are not particularly strong, so timbers increase in size to handle loads applied. This species accepts stains better than most, but it has little rot resistance, so should be used only in dry conditions.

==== Characteristics ====
Freshly cut eastern white pine is yellowish white or a pale straw color, but pine wood which has aged many years tends to darken to a deep, rich, golden tan. Occasionally, one can find light brown pine boards with unusual yellowish-golden or reddish-brown hues. This is the famous "pumpkin pine". Slow growing pines in old-growth forests are thought to accumulate colored products in the heartwood, but genetic factors and soil conditions may also play a role in rich color development.

This wood is also favored by patternmakers for its easy working.

== In culture ==
The indigenous Haudenosaunee (Iroquois Confederation) named the tree the "Tree of Peace" and maintain it as the central symbol of their multinational confederation. Since 2017, it has appeared on the flag and seal of the city of Montreal to represent the indigenous peoples of the area. The Seneca use the name o'sóä' and the Mohawk people call it onerahtase'ko:wa. Within the Wabanaki Confederacy, the Mi'kmaq use the term guow to name the tree, both the Wolastoqewiyik and Peskotomuhkatiyik call it kuw or kuwes, and the Abenaki use the term kowa.

The eastern white pine is the provincial tree of Ontario, Canada.

In the United States, it is the state tree of Maine (as of 1945) and Michigan (as of 1955). Its "pine cone and tassel" is also the state flower of Maine, and was prominently featured on the state's license plates from 1999 to 2025. Maine's new plate design introduced in 2025 features a stylistic depiction of the tree. Sprigs of eastern white pine were worn as badges as a symbol of Vermont identity during the Vermont Republic and are depicted in a stained-glass window in the Vermont State House, on the Flag of Vermont, and on the naval ensign of the Commonwealth of Massachusetts and the state of Maine. The 1901 Maine Flag prominently featured the tree during its brief tenure as Maine's state flag. The Maine State Guard also use the tree in their uniform badges.

== See also ==
- Central Appalachian dry oak–pine forest
