= Marcelle-Gauvreau Ecological Reserve =

Ecological reserve in Quebec

Coordinates: 48.3417°N 70.0278°W

- IUCN category Ia (strict nature reserve)
- Interactive map of Marcelle-Gauvreau Ecological Reserve
- Location: Mont-Valin, Le Fjord-du-Saguenay Regional County Municipality, Québec, Canada
- Established: May 30, 1990

Marcelle-Gauvreau Ecological Reserve is an ecological reserve in Quebec, Canada. It was established on May 30, 1990, and named in honor of the science educator Marcelle Gauvreau. It is located in extreme southern Mont-Valin, near the town of Sacré-Coeur. Around 116 hectares in size, it was created to protect ecosystems typical of mountainous region around Mont-Valin. The Sainte-Marguerite River Old Forest protects forest on either side of the reserve.
