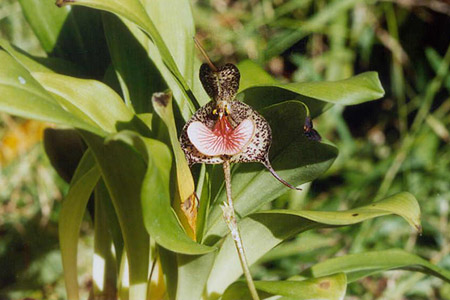

Scientific classification
- Kingdom: Plantae
- Clade: Tracheophytes
- Clade: Angiosperms
- Clade: Monocots
- Order: Asparagales
- Family: Orchidaceae
- Subfamily: Epidendroideae
- Genus: Dracula
- Species: D. chestertonii

Binomial name
- Dracula chestertonii (Rchb.f.) Luer

Synonyms
- Masdevallia chestertonii Rchb.f. (Basionym); Masdevallia macrochila Regel

= Dracula chestertonii =

Frog's skin

Species of orchid

Dracula chestertonii, commonly known as the frog's skin, is a species of orchid endemic to Colombia.

It was named in honour of the collector Henry Chesterton who discovered this species.
