= Sainte-Marguerite River Old Forest =

Forest in Quebec, Canada

- Forêt ancienne de la Rivière-Sainte-Marguerite
- IUCN category III (natural monument or feature)
- Location within Quebec
- Nearest city: Sacré-Coeur, Quebec
- Coordinates: 48.3416667°N 70.0416667°W
- Area: 37 ha (91 acres)
- Designation: Old-growth forest
- Designated: 2003
- Governing body: Quebec Ministère des Ressources naturelles, de la Faune et des Parcs

The Sainte-Marguerite River Old Forest (French: Forêt ancienne de la Rivière-Sainte-Marguerite) is a protected area of old-growth forest in the Saguenay–Lac-Saint-Jean and Côte-Nord regions of Quebec, Canada. It is classified as an exceptional forest ecosystem. It protects an area on the northeast bank of the Sainte-Marguerite River.

== Location ==
TheSainte-Marguerite River Old Forest is in two parts on either side of the Marcelle-Gauvreau Ecological Reserve, along the north side of Quebec Route 172. The west part is in the unorganized territory of Mont-Valin in Le Fjord-du-Saguenay Regional County Municipality of the Saguenay–Lac-Saint-Jean region. The east part is in the La Haute-Côte-Nord Regional County Municipality of Côte-Nord. The forest covers an area of 37 hectares (91 acres), and is 20 kilometres (12 mi) northwest of Sacré-Coeur.

The forest is administered by Quebecʻs Ministry of Natural Resources, Wildlife and Parks, Forest Environment Directorate. It was designated old-growth forest in 2003, and has IUCN management category III. A map of the ecological regions of Quebec shows the Sainte-Marguerite River as the boundary between the fir/yellow birch bioclimatic subdomain to the southwest, and the fir/white birch subdomain to the northeast. Technically, the forest is in the latter subdomain.

The region has rugged terrain with high hills and mountains cut by steep sided valleys. The forest is on the lower part of a mountainside north of the Sainte-Marguerite Valley. It mainly grows on scree slopes made of stones and rocks from the escarpment, with scattered areas of glacial till or soil. The land slopes steeply and drains fast.

== Flora ==
The forest has not suffered from serious natural disturbances such as fires, wind storms or insect infestations for a very long time. The balsam fir (Abies balsamea) trees of the forest have never been disturbed by human activities, although a few northern white-cedar (Thuja occidentalis) have been cut. The forest stands are at least 270 to 290 years old, and have been able to evolve naturally. There are senescent trees and much wood debris in different stages of decomposition. There are cedars almost 300 years old with trunk diameters of 65 centimetres (26 in), and eastern white pine (Pinus strobus) 250 years old with heights of 25 metres (82 ft) and trunks at least 60 centimetres (24 in) in diameter. Given the high latitude and poor soil conditions, the size of the trees is remarkable.

The main stands of the old forest are stands of fir and cedar, in some cases including white pine. The last outbreak of spruce budworm in 1975–1985 reduced the dominance of the fir, and since then several trees have been blown down by the wind, but only in small areas. The abundant paper birch (Betula papyrifera), almost always in open areas, indicates the frequency of minor disturbances. The fir/cedar stands have large numbers of cedars from 200 to 300 years old, with trunk diameters of 42 to 65 centimetres (17 to 26 in). The fir/cedar/white pine stands have white pines more than 230 years old, 25 metres (82 ft) tall and with trunks 50–60 centimetres (20–24 in) in diameter. The abundance of fir in the understory, often with cedar, indicates that these two species will remain dominant for several decades. The white pines, which are at the limit of their natural range, are mostly old specimens located in rocky sites on escarpments.

== Sources ==
- Forêt ancienne de la Rivière-Sainte-Marguerite (PDF) (in French), Ministère des Ressources naturelles, de la Faune et des Parcs, archived from the original (PDF) on 2020-10-07
- Forêt ancienne de la Rivière-Sainte-Marguerite, Natural Resources Canada
- Forêt ancienne de la Rivière-Sainte-Marguerite in Canada, Protected Planet
- Saucier, J.-P.; Robitaille, A.; Grondin, P.; Bergeron, J.-F.; Gosselin, J. (2011), Les régions écologiques du Québec méridional (PDF) (map), 4 (in French), Ministère des Ressources naturelles et de la Faune, archived from the original (PDF) on 2020-06-19
