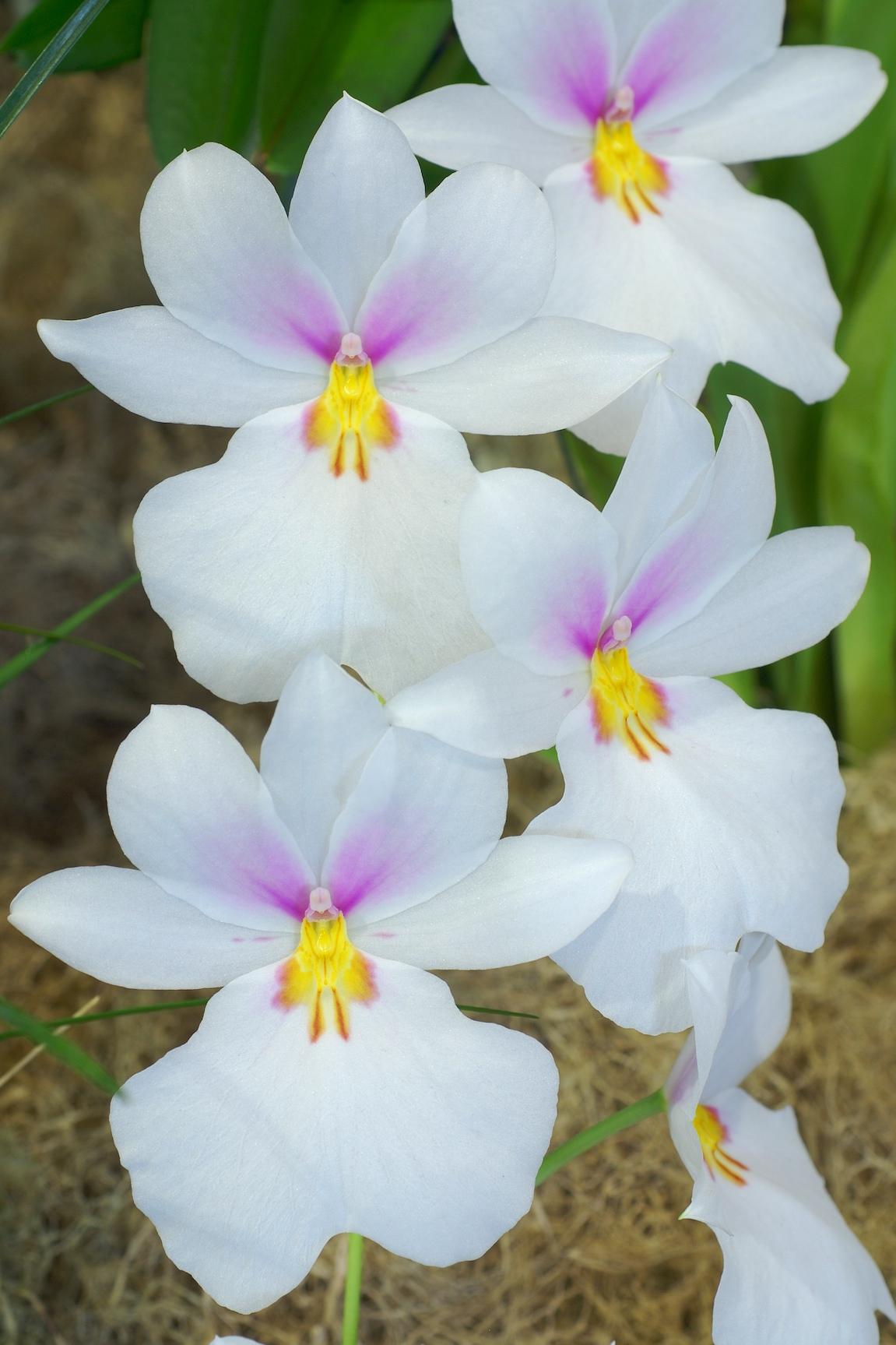

Scientific classification
- Kingdom: Plantae
- Clade: Tracheophytes
- Clade: Angiosperms
- Clade: Monocots
- Order: Asparagales
- Family: Orchidaceae
- Subfamily: Epidendroideae
- Genus: Miltoniopsis
- Species: M. vexillaria

Binomial name
- Miltoniopsis vexillaria (Rchb.f) Godefroy-Lebeuf

Synonyms
- Miltonia vexillaria (Rchb.f) Nicholson; Odontoglossum vexillarium Rchb.f

= Miltoniopsis vexillaria =

Species of orchid

Miltoniopsis vexillaria ("the flag-like Miltoniopsis") is a species of epiphytic orchid in the genus Miltoniopsis.

== Description ==
The plants are pale green and about 12 inches (300 mm) tall. Inflorescences are about 12 inches (300 mm) long and carry up to four blossoms. The large, showy flowers are 2 inches (51 mm) – 4 inches (100 mm) across. They may be pink, often with white margins on the segments, or they may be white, sometimes with a pink flush or pink stripes. The lip, which has yellow markings at the base, is also marked with maroon stripes and blotches. The blossoms are very flat.

== Distribution ==
Miltoniopsis vexillaria is found in isolated patches in the central mountain region of Colombia and on the western slopes of the Cordillera Occidental from the department of Antioquia in the north and also further south in northern Ecuador. It grows on the margins of montane forests at between 3,600 feet (1,100 m) and 7,250 feet (2,210 m).

== Culture ==
Miltoniopsis vexillaria is a cool growing species and thrives in a temperate, frost-free climate. It should be grown in moderate light with intermediate to warm temperatures and requires a humidity range of 50 to 90%. During hot summers, the plant should be watered daily.

In the winter, when the weather is cold and dull, the plant should be watered sparingly, but the growing medium should not be allowed to dry out. The winter temperatures should not fall below 10°C (50°F), and good ventilation is essential.

== Discovery ==
Miltoniopsis vexillaria was first recorded in 1867 by the Victorian plant collector, David Bowman, who had been sent to South America by James Veitch & Sons of Chelsea, London. Bowman was unable to send a live sample back to England before he died of dysentery. Subsequently, other plant collectors, including Gustav Wallis and Benedikt Roezl, also came across the plant but the first collector to successfully introduce it to England was Henry Chesterton. In 1870, Chesterton had been sent by Harry Veitch to Colombia with the specific instructions to locate and bring back to England "the much-talked-of and long-desired "scarlet Odontoglossum". According to the account in Hortus Veitchii:

"Provided with but the scantiest information as to the native habitat, long kept secret and shrouded in mystery, Chesterton started, and not only succeeded in discovering the plant, but safely introduced it to Chelsea, where it flowered for the first time in 1873."

== Varieties and cultivars ==
There are many cultivated varieties of M. vexillaria including:

- M. vexillaria var. Alba
- M. vexillaria var. Lambauenana
- M. vexillaria var. Leucoglossa
- M. vexillaria var. Daniela

== Synonyms ==
1. Odontoglossum vexillarium Rchb.f 1867
2. Miltonia vexillaria Rchb.f Nicholson 1884 – 88

== Postage stamps ==
In September 2006, M. vexillaria was featured on a series of postage stamps issued by the Ecuador postal authorities.
