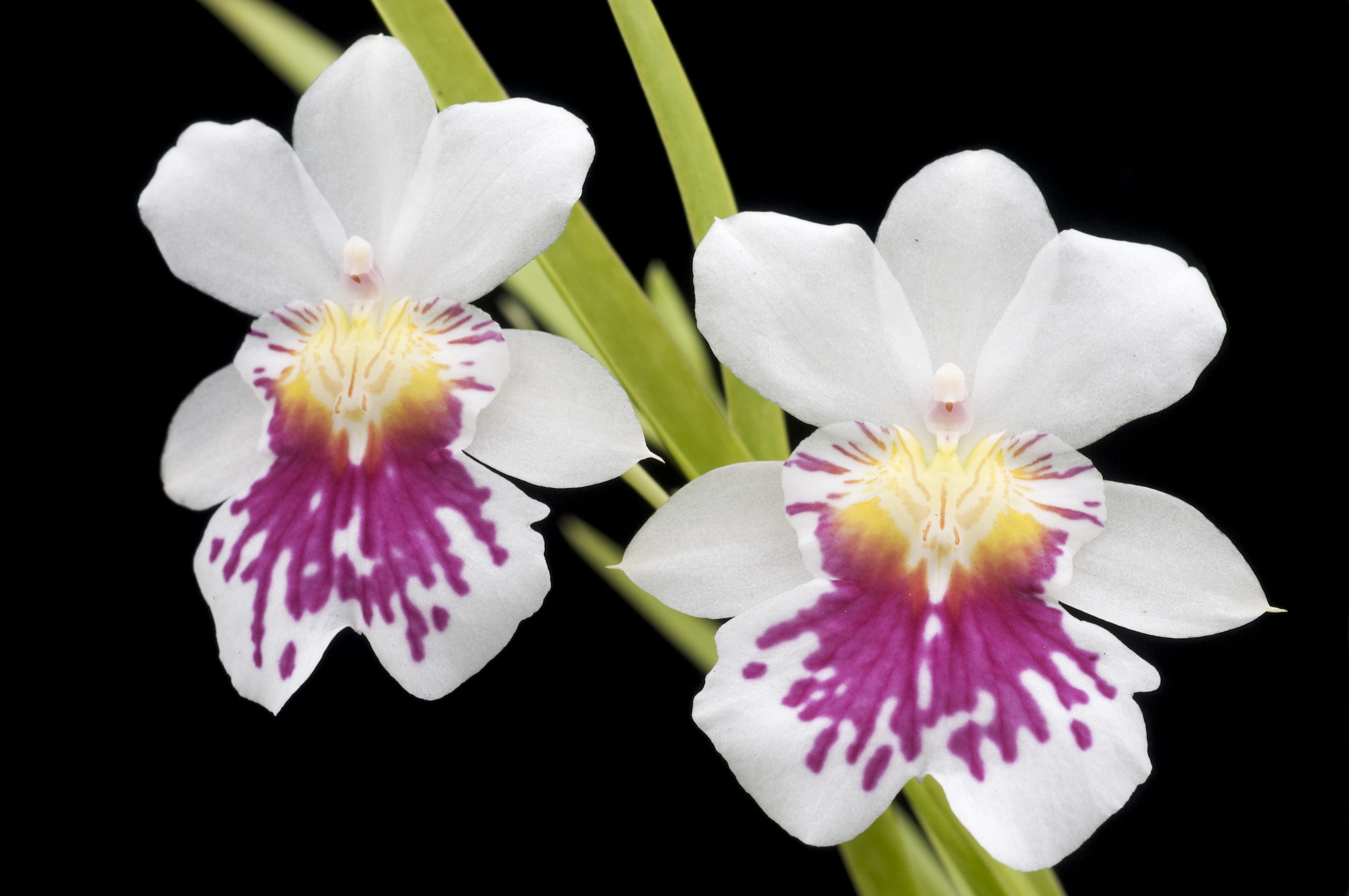
- Miltoniopsis phalaenopsis

Scientific classification
- Kingdom: Plantae
- Clade: Tracheophytes
- Clade: Angiosperms
- Clade: Monocots
- Order: Asparagales
- Family: Orchidaceae
- Subfamily: Epidendroideae
- Tribe: Cymbidieae
- Subtribe: Oncidiinae
- Genus: Miltoniopsis; God.-Leb.

Type species
- Miltoniopsis vexillaria (Rchb.f.) Godefroy-Lebeuf.

Species
- Miltoniopsis bismarckii; Miltoniopsis phalaenopsis; Miltoniopsis roezlii; Miltoniopsis vexillaria; Miltoniopsis warscewiczii

= Miltoniopsis =

Genus of orchids

Miltoniopsis, abbreviated Mps. in horticultural trade, is a genus of orchids native to Costa Rica, Panama, Venezuela, Colombia, Ecuador, and Peru. This genus comprises 5 species. The genus has the common name pansy orchid.

Although the flowers are similar, Miltoniopsis differs from Miltonia by having one leaf to each pseudobulb, and a lobed column that is united to the labellum through a keel. In addition, the column is not concave at the base.

== Species ==
Image	Name	Distribution	Elevation (m)
	Miltoniopsis bismarckii Dodson & D.E. Benn.	Ecuador and Peru	600–1800 meters
	Miltoniopsis phalaenopsis (Linden & Rchb. f.) Garay & Dunst.	Colombia (Cundinamarca and Norte de Santander)	1200–1500 meters
	Miltoniopsis roezlii (Rchb. f.) God.-Leb.	Colombia, Ecuador, Peru and Panama	200–1000 meters
	Miltoniopsis vexillaria [Rchb.f] Garay & Dunsterville	Colombia (Antioquia, Risaralda, and Valle de Cauca) and northern Ecuador	1000–2200 meters
	Miltoniopsis warscewiczii (Rchb. f.) Garay & Dunst.	Costa Rica, Panama and Colombia (Choco and Antioquia )	1000–2000 meters
