= David Bowman (botanist) =

British botanist (1838–1868)

David Bowman (3 September 1838 – 25 June 1868) was a British plant collector who, in 1866, was sent by James Veitch & Sons to collect in Brazil. The species Dieffenbachia bowmannii is named after him.

== Career ==
Bowman was born at Arniston near Edinburgh, where his father worked as a gardener. Bowman started his gardening career working with his father, before working at the gardens at Dalhousie Castle, Archerfield, and Dunmore Park, all in Scotland. He later took up a position as foreman in the gardens of the Royal Horticultural Society at Chiswick, west London.

In 1866, he was recruited by James Veitch & Sons of Chelsea, who, in a joint venture with William Wilson Saunders, sent him to Brazil to search for orchids and other plants. He travelled initially to Rio de Janeiro and travelled across the continent to Colombia. Amongst the plants he discovered and sent to his employers were Dieffenbachia bowmanii and Paullinia thalictrifolia, a climbing hothouse plant with fern-like foliage. He also found two orchids, Odontoglossum crispum 'Alexandrae' and Cyanophyllum bowmanii, which was later awarded a first-class certificate by the RHS's Floral Committee. Whilst in Colombia, he also discovered Miltoniopsis vexillaria, but was unable to send a specimen back to England.

As well as sending back plants for Veitch, he also obtained material for private collectors in England and for the Royal Horticultural Society. He was preparing to ship a large collection to England from La Paz when he was attacked, losing most of his finds and as a result was instructed by James Veitch, Jr. to remain in Colombia in order to re-trace his steps.

Shortly afterwards, he contracted dysentery which led to his death on 25 June 1868. He was buried in the British cemetery at Bogotá.
