= Arniston, Midlothian =

Coordinates: 55.83°N 03.05°W

Arniston
- Location within Midlothian
- OS grid reference: NT3361
- Council area: Midlothian
- Lieutenancy area: Midlothian
- Country: Scotland
- Sovereign state: United Kingdom
- Post town: GOREBRIDGE
- Postcode district: EH23
- Dialling code: 01875
- Police: Scotland
- Fire: Scottish
- Ambulance: Scottish
- UK Parliament: Midlothian
- Scottish Parliament: Midlothian South, Tweeddale and Lauderdale

Arniston is a village in Midlothian, Scotland.

== People from Arniston ==
The plant collector, David Bowman, was born in Arniston in 1838.

== See also ==
- Arniston House
