= Restrepia fistulosa =

Scientific classification
- Kingdom: Plantae
- Clade: Tracheophytes
- Clade: Angiosperms
- Clade: Monocots
- Order: Asparagales
- Family: Orchidaceae
- Subfamily: Epidendroideae
- Genus: Restrepia
- Species: R. fistulosa

Binomial name
- Restrepia fistulosa Vierling

Species of flowering plant

Restrepia fistulosa is a species of flowering plant in the family Orchidaceae. It is an epiphyte that is likely to be native to South America. The species was described in 2022.

== Taxonomy ==
The species was described by Gerhard Vierling in 2022. The holotype is of unknown origin. It was collected by Vierling in 2018, and flowered in cultivation.

== Distribution ==
Restrepia fistulosa is likely to be native to the wet tropical biome of western South America.

== Description ==
The lip is slender, and shaped like an elongated fiddle. The synsepal is rolled down at the sides, creating a tube.

Restrepia fistulosa is similar to Restrepia ephippium, though the species differ in the details of the flowers.
