= Restrepia divaricata =

Scientific classification
- Kingdom: Plantae
- Clade: Tracheophytes
- Clade: Angiosperms
- Clade: Monocots
- Order: Asparagales
- Family: Orchidaceae
- Subfamily: Epidendroideae
- Genus: Restrepia
- Species: R. divaricata

Binomial name
- Restrepia divaricata Vierling

Species of flowering plant

Restrepia divaricata is a species of flowering plant in the family Orchidaceae. It is an epiphyte, and is likely to be native to South America.

== Taxonomy ==
Restrepia divaricata was described by Gerhard Vierling in 2022.

The holotype is a cultivated plant. It was collected by Vierling in 2018.

== Distribution ==
The species is likely to be native to the wet tropical biome of Western South America.
