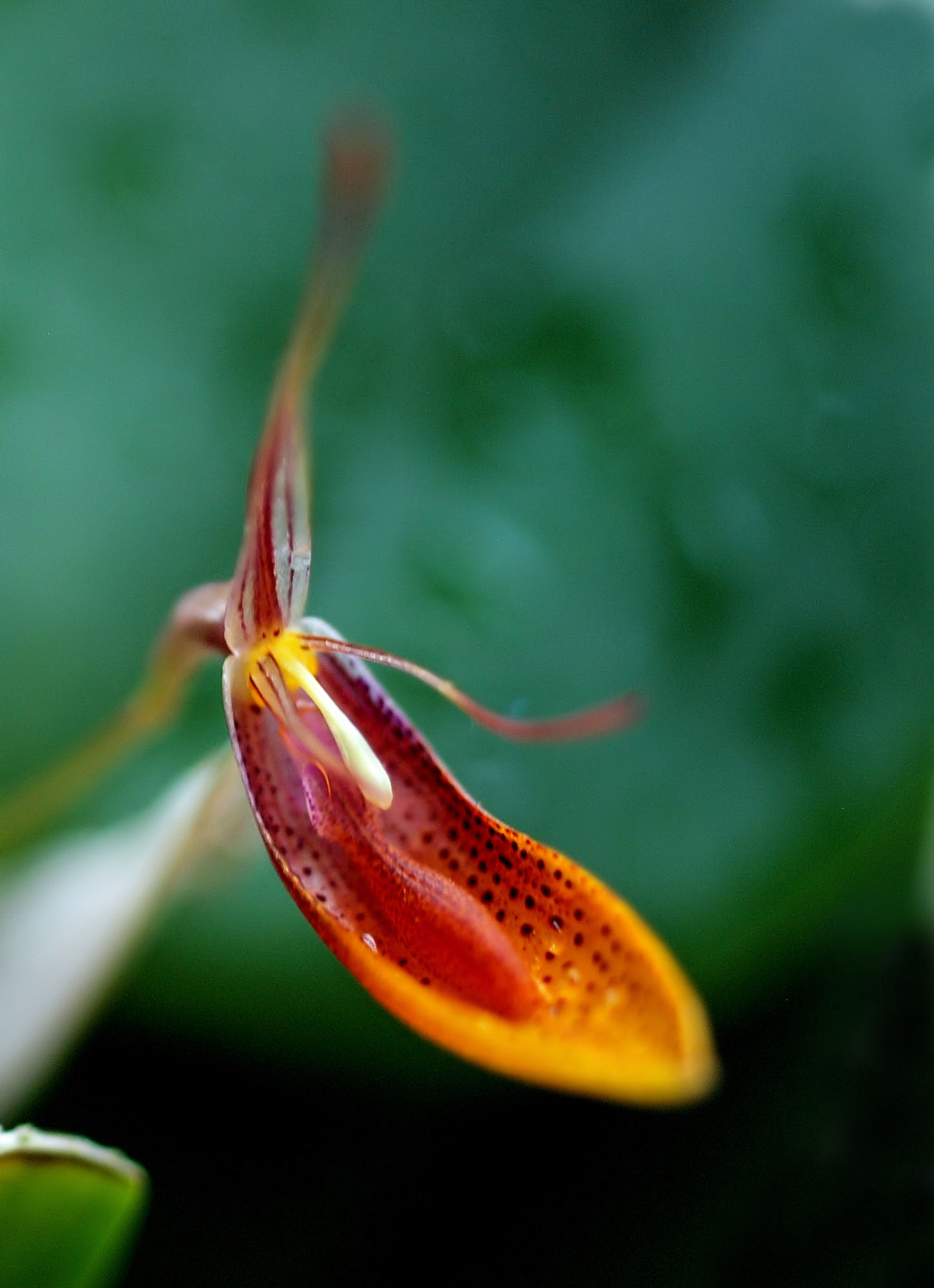

Conservation status
- CITES Appendix II

Scientific classification
- Kingdom: Plantae
- Clade: Tracheophytes
- Clade: Angiosperms
- Clade: Monocots
- Order: Asparagales
- Family: Orchidaceae
- Subfamily: Epidendroideae
- Genus: Restrepia
- Species: R. mohrii

Binomial name
- Restrepia mohrii Braem

= Restrepia mohrii =

Species of flowering plant

Restrepia mohrii is a species of flowering plant in the family Orchidaceae. It is an epiphyte.

The species is native to Peru, and was described in 1991. It is listed in Appendix II of CITES.

== Taxonomy ==
Restrepia mohrii was named in 1991, by Guido Jozef Braem.

== Distribution ==
Restrepia mohrii is native to the wet tropical biome of Peru.

== Conservation ==
Restrepia mohrii is listed in Appendix II of CITES. There are no suspensions or quotas in place for the species.
