= Restrepia extensa =

Scientific classification
- Kingdom: Plantae
- Clade: Tracheophytes
- Clade: Angiosperms
- Clade: Monocots
- Order: Asparagales
- Family: Orchidaceae
- Subfamily: Epidendroideae
- Genus: Restrepia
- Species: R. extensa

Binomial name
- Restrepia extensa Vierling

Species of flowering plant

Restrepia extensa is a species of flowering plant in the family Orchidaceae. It is an epiphyte. The species was described in 2022, and is likely to be native to South America.

== Taxonomy ==
Restrepia extensa was described by Gerhard Vierling in 2022. The holotype is a cultivated plant, that was collected in 2018.

== Distribution ==
Restrepia extensa is likely to be native to the wet tropical biome of western South America.
