= Restrepia persicina =

Conservation status
- CITES Appendix II

Scientific classification
- Kingdom: Plantae
- Clade: Tracheophytes
- Clade: Angiosperms
- Clade: Monocots
- Order: Asparagales
- Family: Orchidaceae
- Subfamily: Epidendroideae
- Genus: Restrepia
- Species: R. persicina

Binomial name
- Restrepia persicina Luer & Hirtz

Species of flowering plant

Restrepia persicina is a species of flowering plant in the family Orchidaceae. It is an epiphyte.

The species was described in 2006, and is listed in Appendix II of CITES.

== Taxonomy ==
Restrepia persicina was described by Carlyle A. Luer and Alexander Charles Hirtz in 2006. The holotype was collected by Hirtz in 2004, from Zamora-Chinchipe Province, Ecuador, at an elevation of 1,500 metres (4,900 ft).

== Distribution ==
Restrepia persicina is native to the wet tropical biome of Zamora-Chinchipe, Ecuador.

== Conservation ==
Restrepia persicina is listed in Appendix II of CITES. There are no suspensions or quotas in place for the species.
