= Restrepia howei =

Conservation status
- CITES Appendix II

Scientific classification
- Kingdom: Plantae
- Clade: Tracheophytes
- Clade: Angiosperms
- Clade: Monocots
- Order: Asparagales
- Family: Orchidaceae
- Subfamily: Epidendroideae
- Genus: Restrepia
- Species: R. howei

Binomial name
- Restrepia howei Luer

Species of flowering plant

Restrepia howei is a species of flowering plant in the family Orchidaceae. It is an epiphyte native to the wet tropical biome of Ecuador.

The species was described in 2005, and is listed in Appendix II of CITES.

== Taxonomy ==
Restrepia howei was described by Carlyle A. Luer in 2005. The description was published in Monographs in Systematic Botany.

The type specimen was collected in Ecuador, in 2004, and cultivated in Berkshire, England.

== Conservation ==
Restrepia howei is listed in Appendix II of CITES. There are no quotas or suspensions in place for the species.
