= Restrepia archilarum =

Conservation status
- CITES Appendix II

Scientific classification
- Kingdom: Plantae
- Clade: Tracheophytes
- Clade: Angiosperms
- Clade: Monocots
- Order: Asparagales
- Family: Orchidaceae
- Subfamily: Epidendroideae
- Genus: Restrepia
- Species: R. archilarum

Binomial name
- Restrepia archilarum Chiron & Szlach.

Species of flowering plant

Restrepia archilarum is a species of flowering plant in the family Orchidaceae. It is an epiphyte native to Guatemala.

The species was described in 2013, and is listed in Appendix II of CITES.

== Taxonomy ==
Restrepia archilarum was described by Guy Robert Chiron and Dariusz Szlachetko in 2013, as Restrepia archilae. The holotype was collected by Fredy Archila Morales, in 1992. It was found in Guatemala, at an elevation of 1,400 metres (4,600 ft).

== Distribution ==
Restrepia archilarum is native to the wet tropical biome of Guatemala.

== Description ==
Restrepia archilarum is an epiphyte. It is 22–23 centimetres (8.7–9.1 in) tall. The flowers are yellow. The synsepal and lip have dark-red and purple spots.

== Conservation ==
Restrepia archilarum is listed in Appendix II of CITES. There are no quotas or suspensions in place for the species.

== Etymology ==
Restrepia archilarum is named after the Archila de Cobán family, recognising their work on orchids. The species was originally named Restrepia archilae. However, according to the rules of the International Code of Nomenclature for algae, fungi, and plants, names honouring groups should end in rum. Therefore, the species is correctly known as Restrepia archilarum.
