= Restrepia tenebricosa =

Scientific classification
- Kingdom: Plantae
- Clade: Tracheophytes
- Clade: Angiosperms
- Clade: Monocots
- Order: Asparagales
- Family: Orchidaceae
- Subfamily: Epidendroideae
- Genus: Restrepia
- Species: R. tenebricosa

Binomial name
- Restrepia tenebricosa Vierling

Species of flowering plant

Restrepia tenebricosa is a species of flowering plant in the family Orchidaceae. It is an epiphyte, and is likely to be native to South America. The species was described in 2022.

== Taxonomy ==
The species was described by Gerhard Vierling in 2022. The origin of the holotype is unknown.

== Distribution ==
Restrepia tenebricosa is likely to be native to the wet tropical biome of western South America.

== Description ==
Restrepia tenebricosa is an epiphyte. The leaves are elliptical to oval-shaped. The synsepal is dark in colour. The lip is oblong in shape, and has yellow tubercules.
