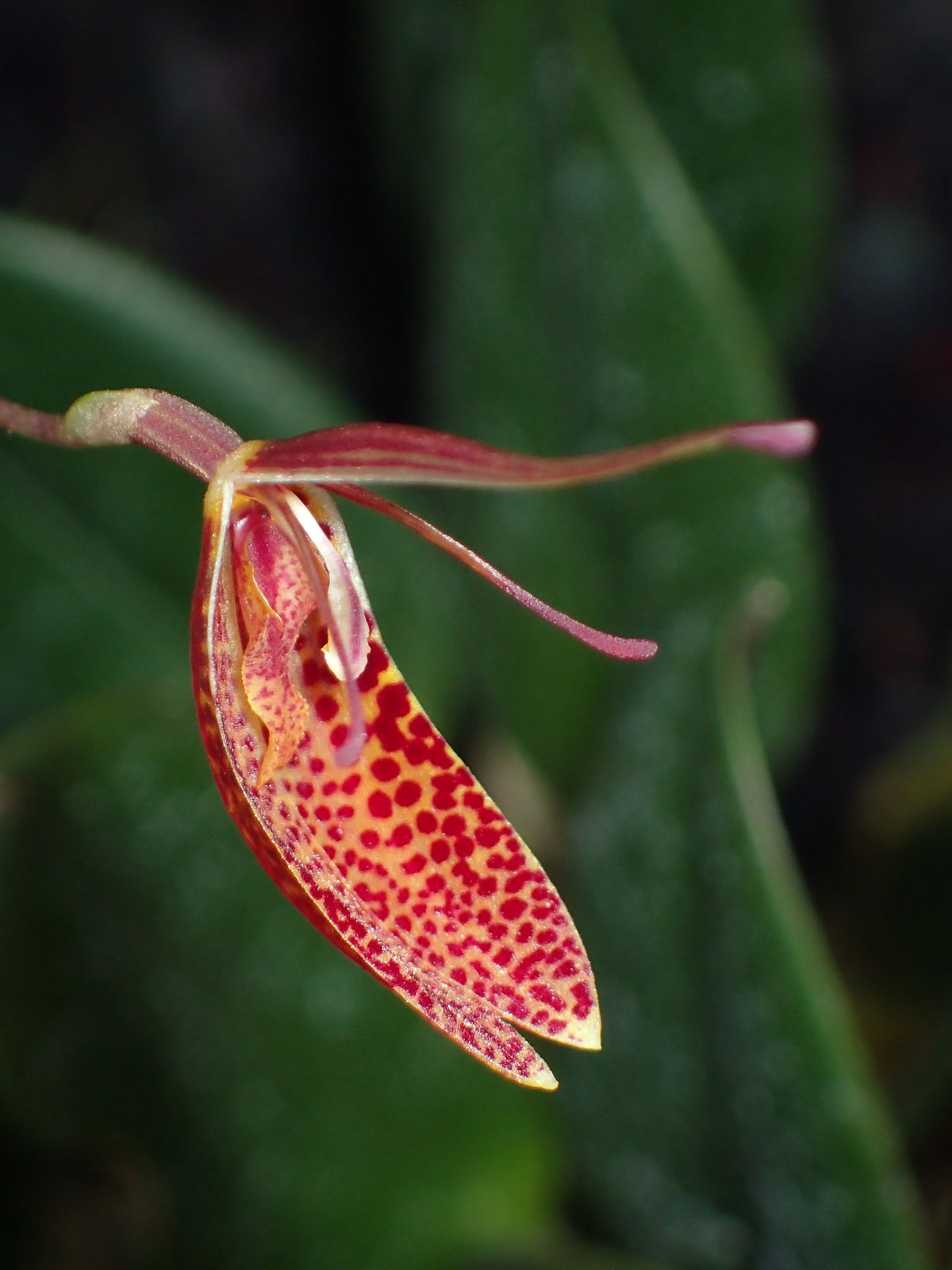

Conservation status
- CITES Appendix II

Scientific classification
- Kingdom: Plantae
- Clade: Tracheophytes
- Clade: Angiosperms
- Clade: Monocots
- Order: Asparagales
- Family: Orchidaceae
- Subfamily: Epidendroideae
- Genus: Restrepia
- Species: R. cymbula

Binomial name
- Restrepia cymbula Luer & R.Escobar

= Restrepia cymbula =

Species of flowering plant

Restrepia cymbula is a species of flowering plant in the family Orchidaceae. It is an epiphyte.

Restrepia cymbula is native to the wet tropical biome of Ecuador. It was described by Carlyle A. Luer and Rodrigo Escobar in 1996.

== Conservation ==
Restrepia cymbula is listed in Appendix II of CITES. There are no quotas or suspensions in place for the species.
