= Restrepia cloesii =

Conservation status
- CITES Appendix II

Scientific classification
- Kingdom: Plantae
- Clade: Tracheophytes
- Clade: Angiosperms
- Clade: Monocots
- Order: Asparagales
- Family: Orchidaceae
- Subfamily: Epidendroideae
- Genus: Restrepia
- Species: R. cloesii

Binomial name
- Restrepia cloesii Luer

Species of flowering plant

Restrepia cloesii is a species of flowering plant in the orchid family.

Restrepia cloesii is native to the wet tropical biome of Peru. It is an epiphyte.

== Taxonomy ==
The species was named by Carlyle A. Luer in 1996. The type specimen was collected in Peru. It flowered in cultivation at Hasselt, Belgium.

== Conservation ==
The species is listed in Appendix II of CITES.
