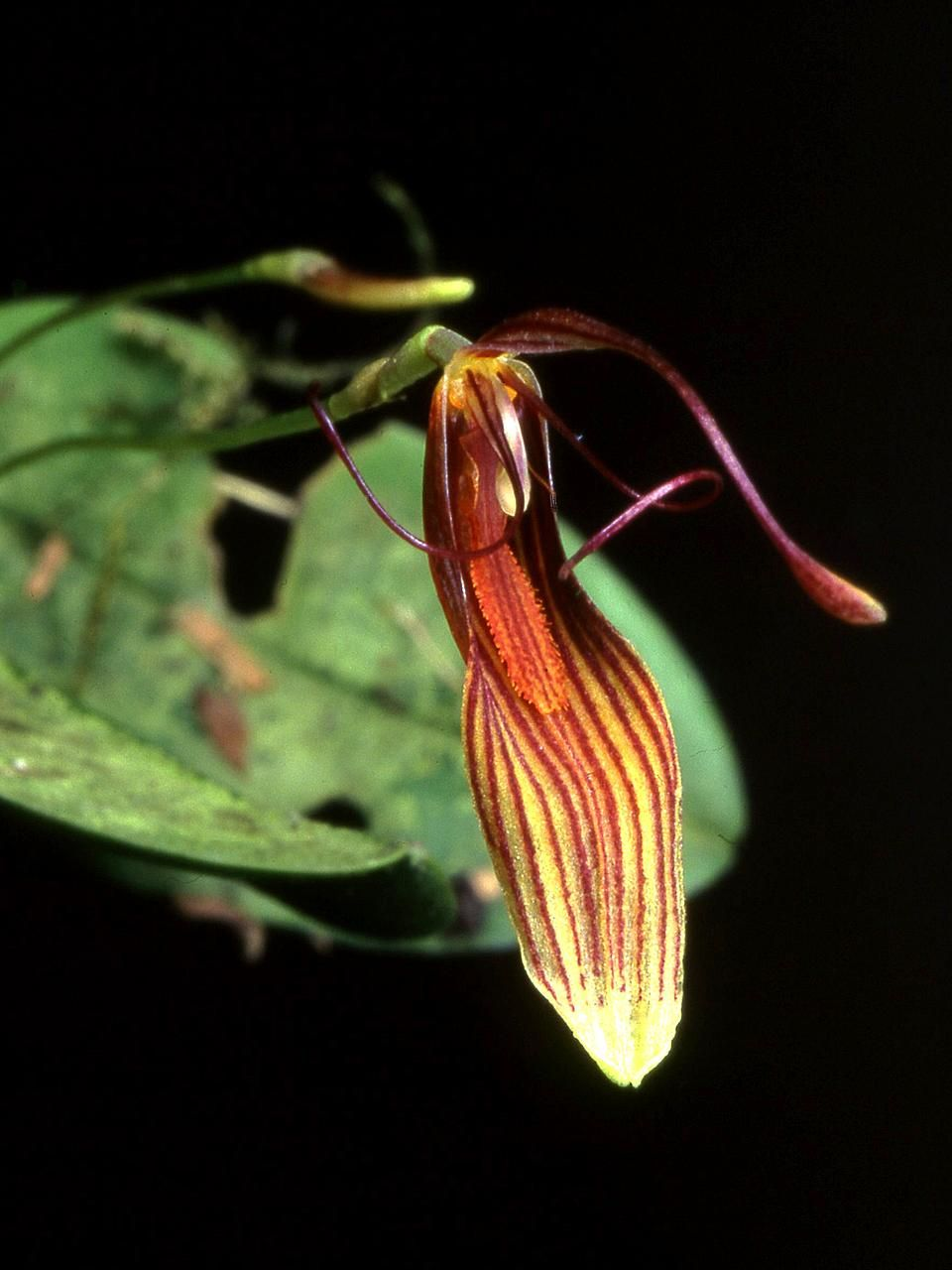
- Flower of Restrepia wageneri

Conservation status
- CITES Appendix II

Scientific classification
- Kingdom: Plantae
- Clade: Tracheophytes
- Clade: Angiosperms
- Clade: Monocots
- Order: Asparagales
- Family: Orchidaceae
- Subfamily: Epidendroideae
- Genus: Restrepia
- Species: R. wageneri

Binomial name
- Restrepia wageneri Rchb.f.

= Restrepia wageneri =

Species of orchid

Restrepia wageneri is a species of orchid endemic to northwestern Venezuela.

The species was described in 1854, by Heinrich Gustav Reichenbach.
