= Restrepia cobanensis =

Conservation status
- CITES Appendix II

Scientific classification
- Kingdom: Plantae
- Clade: Tracheophytes
- Clade: Angiosperms
- Clade: Monocots
- Order: Asparagales
- Family: Orchidaceae
- Subfamily: Epidendroideae
- Genus: Restrepia
- Species: R. cobanensis

Binomial name
- Restrepia cobanensis Archila, Chiron & Szlach.

Species of flowering plant

Restrepia cobanensis is a species of flowering plant in the family Orchidaceae. It is an epiphyte native to Guatemala.

The species was described in 2013, and is listed in Appendix II of CITES.

== Distribution ==
Restrepia cobanensis is native to the wet tropical biome of Guatemala.

== Taxonomy ==
Restrepia cobanensis was described by Fredy Archila, Guy Robert Chiron, and Dariusz Szlachetko in 2013. The holotype was collected by Archila, from Cobán, Guatemala, at an elevation of 900 metres (3,000 ft).

== Conservation ==
Restrepia cobanensis is listed in Appendix II of CITES. There are no suspensions or quotas in place for the species.
