= Restrepia nicolasii =

Conservation status
- CITES Appendix II

Scientific classification
- Kingdom: Plantae
- Clade: Tracheophytes
- Clade: Angiosperms
- Clade: Monocots
- Order: Asparagales
- Family: Orchidaceae
- Subfamily: Epidendroideae
- Genus: Restrepia
- Species: R. nicolasii

Binomial name
- Restrepia nicolasii Archila, Szlach. & Chiron

Species of flowering plant

Restrepia nicolasii is a species of flowering plant in the family Orchidaceae. It is an epiphyte.

The species is native to Guatemala. It was described in 2017, and is listed in Appendix II of CITES.

== Distribution ==
Restrepia nicolasii is native to the wet tropical biome of Guatemala.

== Taxonomy ==
Restrepia nicolasii was described by Fredy Archila, Dariusz Szlachetko, and Guy Robert Chiron in 2017. The type specimen was collected in 2016, in Cobán, Guatemala, at an elevation of 800 metres (2,600 ft).

== Conservation ==
Restrepia nicolasii is listed in Appendix II of CITES. There are no quotas or suspensions in place for the species.

== Etymology ==
Restrepia nicolasii is named after Nicolás Llarena Hernández.
