= Restrepia devolvens =

Scientific classification
- Kingdom: Plantae
- Clade: Tracheophytes
- Clade: Angiosperms
- Clade: Monocots
- Order: Asparagales
- Family: Orchidaceae
- Subfamily: Epidendroideae
- Genus: Restrepia
- Species: R. devolvens

Binomial name
- Restrepia devolvens Vierling

Species of flowering plant

Restrepia devolvens is a species of flowering plant in the family Orchidaceae. It is an epiphyte. It was described in 2022, and is likely to be native to western South America.

The specific epithet refers to the edges of the lateral sepals, which are rolled down.

== Taxonomy ==
Restrepia devolvens was described by Gerhard Vierling in 2022. Vierling collected the holotype in 2018.

== Distribution ==
The species is likely to be native to the wet tropical biome of western South America.

== Etymology ==
The specific epithet is derived from the latin verb devolvens ("rolling down"). It refers to the edges of the lateral sepals, which are bent down.
