= Restrepia radulifera =

Conservation status
- CITES Appendix II

Scientific classification
- Kingdom: Plantae
- Clade: Tracheophytes
- Clade: Angiosperms
- Clade: Monocots
- Order: Asparagales
- Family: Orchidaceae
- Subfamily: Epidendroideae
- Genus: Restrepia
- Species: R. radulifera

Binomial name
- Restrepia radulifera Luer & R.Escobar

Species of flowering plant

Restrepia radulifera is a species of flowering plant in the family Orchidaceae. It is an epiphyte native to Venezuela. The species was described in 1996, and is listed in Appendix II of CITES.

== Taxonomy ==
Restrepia radulifera was described by Carlyle A. Luer and Rodrigo Escobar in 1996. The holotype was collected in Táchira, Venezuela, at an elevation of around 2,500 metres (8,200 ft).

== Distribution ==
Restrepia radulifera is native to the wet tropical biome of Mérida, Venezuela.

== Conservation ==
Restrepia radulifera is listed in Appendix II of CITES. There are no quotas or suspensions in place for the species.
