= Restrepia peetersii =

Conservation status
- CITES Appendix II

Scientific classification
- Kingdom: Plantae
- Clade: Tracheophytes
- Clade: Angiosperms
- Clade: Monocots
- Order: Asparagales
- Family: Orchidaceae
- Subfamily: Epidendroideae
- Genus: Restrepia
- Species: R. peetersii

Binomial name
- Restrepia peetersii Luer & Sijm

Species of flowering plant

Restrepia peetersii is a species of flowering plant in the family Orchidaceae. It is a small epiphytyic orchid, with white sepals and translucent petals.

Restrepia peetersii is native to Ecuador. The species was described in 2011, and named after Peter Peeters. It is listed in Appendix II of CITES.

== Distribution ==
Restrepia peetersii is native to the wet tropical biome of Ecuador.

== Taxonomy ==
Restrepia peetersii was described in 2011, by Carlyle A. Luer and A.P. Sijm. The type specimen was purchased in June 2002. It flowered in 2010, when cultivated in the Netherlands.

== Description ==
Restrepia peetersii is a small epiphyte with slender roots. The stems are 3–3.5 centimetres (1.2–1.4 in) long, and surrounded by four or five thin white sheaths.

The leaves are broadly ovate, rigid and leathery, and have purple parts. The leaves are around 4.2 centimetres (1.7 in) long, and around 3.2 centimetres (1.3 in) wide. They have 3 millimetres (0.12 in) long stems.

The flower is solitary, and has a slender stem, which is around 2 millimetres (0.079 in) long. The dorsal sepal is white, with reddish-purple spots. The dorsal sepal is 24 millimetres (0.94 in) long, and 4.5 millimetres (0.18 in) wide. The lateral sepals are white, with rose coloured spots. The lateral sepals are 22 millimetres (0.87 in) long, and 16 millimetres (0.63 in) wide.

The petals are 13 millimetres (0.51 in) long, and translucent, with purple markings and a yellow apex. The labellum is 10 millimetres (0.39 in) long, 4 millimetres (0.16 in) wide, and pale yellow, with rose and purple dots.

The floral axis has a pair of low keels, which extend forwards. The ovary is purple, and around 4 millimetres (0.16 in) long. The column is 6 millimetres (0.24 in) long, slender, and white.

Restrepia peetersii is distinguished by its small size, and broadly ovate leaves with purple portions.

== Conservation ==
Restrepia peetersii is listed in Appendix II of CITES. There are no quotas or suspensions in place for the species.

== Etymology ==
Restrepia peetersii is named after Peter Peeters, who cultivates the species.
