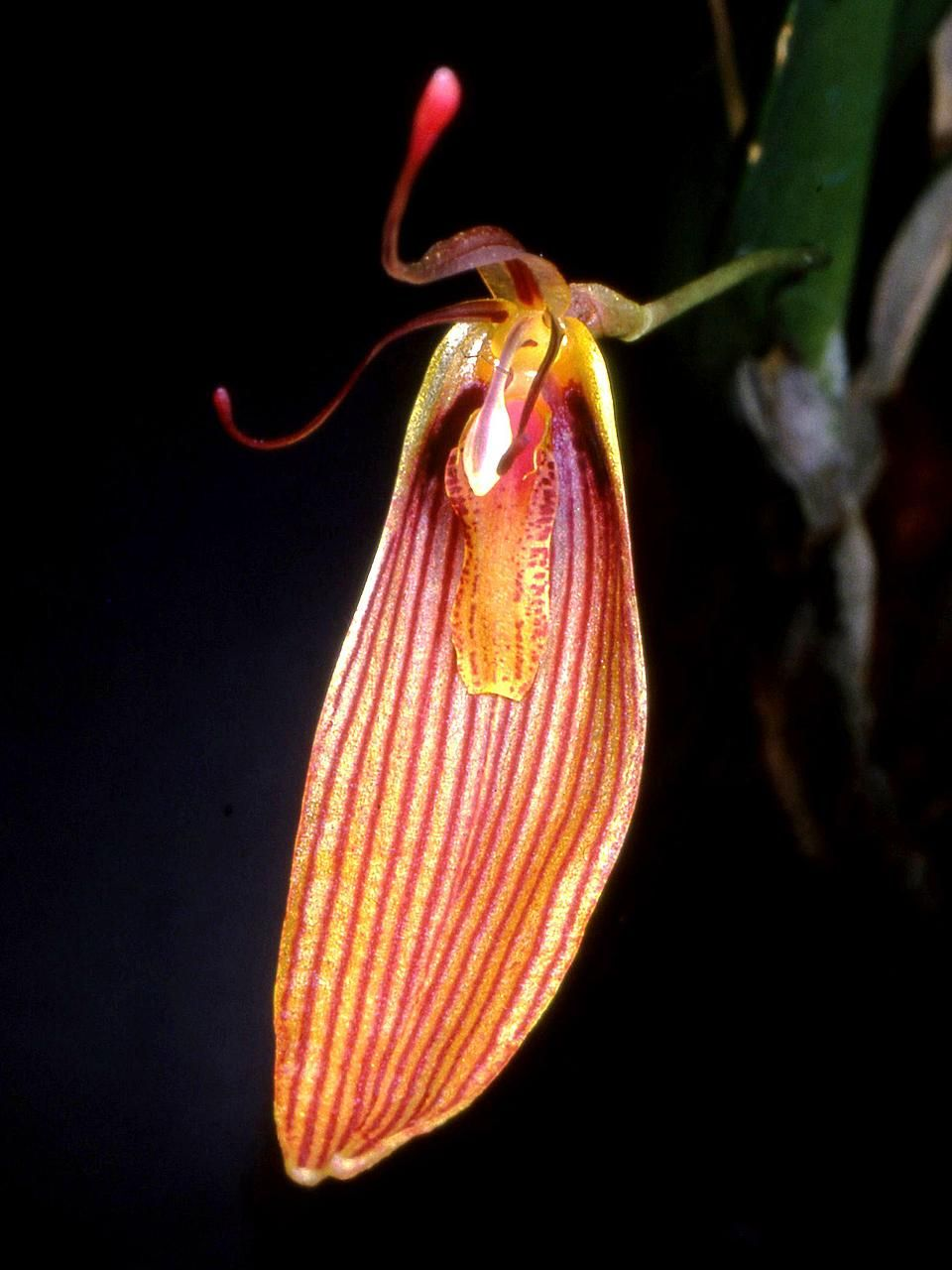
- Antennae-carrying Restrepia (Restrepia antennifera)

Scientific classification
- Kingdom: Plantae
- Clade: Tracheophytes
- Clade: Angiosperms
- Clade: Monocots
- Order: Asparagales
- Family: Orchidaceae
- Subfamily: Epidendroideae
- Tribe: Epidendreae
- Subtribe: Pleurothallidinae
- Genus: Restrepia; Kunth (1816)

Type species
- Restrepia antennifera Kunth in F.W.H.von Humboldt, A.J.A.Bonpland & C.S.Kunth

= Restrepia =

Genus of orchids

Restrepia, abbreviated Rstp in horticultural trade, is a small genus of 69 species in the orchid family (Orchidaceae), closely related to Pleurothallis. Named in honor of Don Jose Restrepo, it tends to be more showy than most other Pleurothallids. They are found primarily at higher altitudes in the cool, damp montane forests of the Andes and Venezuela, with some into Central America up to southern Mexico.

== Description ==
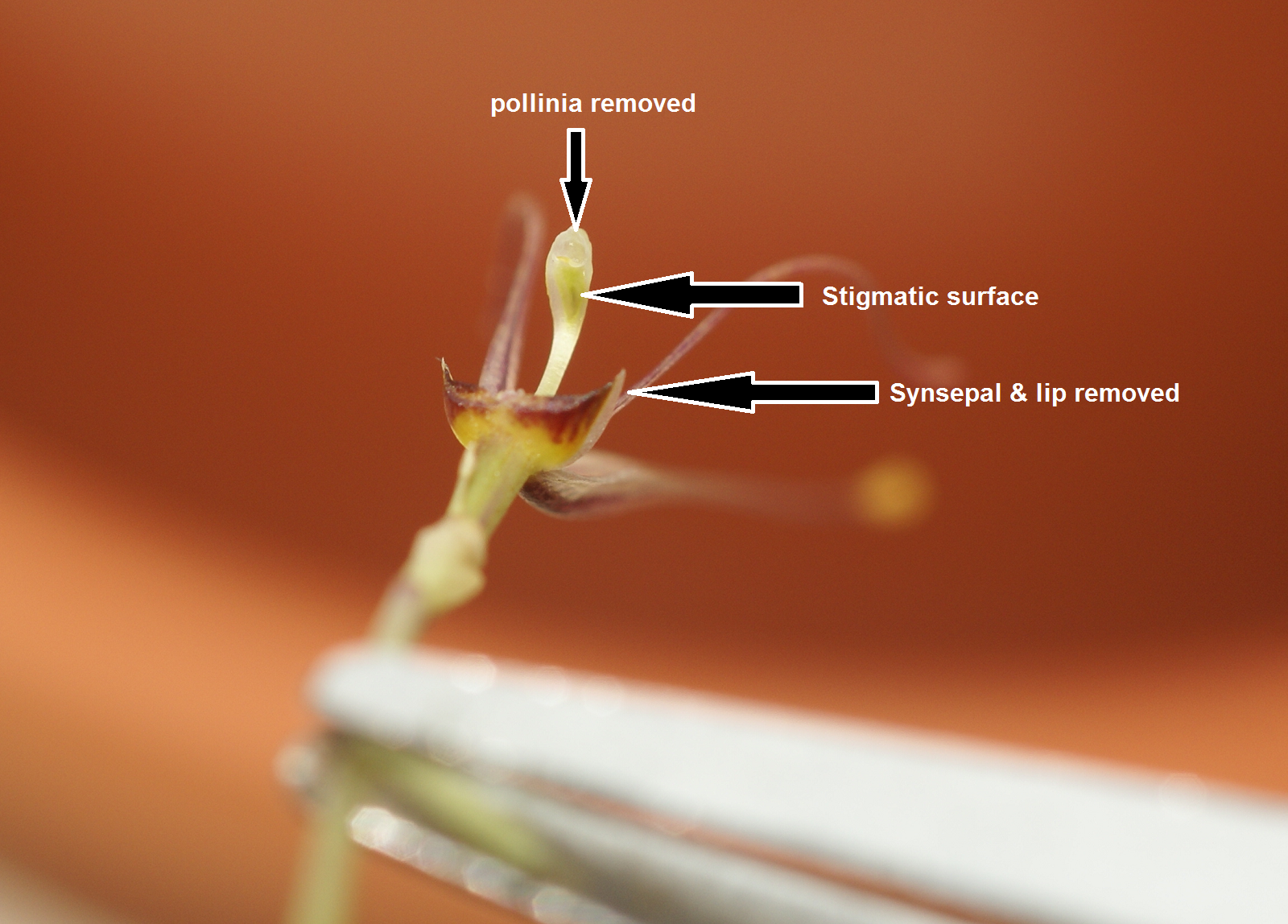
Restrepia flower column

These tiny epiphytic and rarely lithophytic orchids lack pseudobulbs. The erect, thick, leathery leaf is elliptic-ovate in shape. The aerial roots seem like fine hairs.

The flowers develop one at a time at the base of the leaf. They are borne on a slender peduncle, originating from the base of the back of the leaf. The long dorsal sepal is erect and ends in a somewhat thicker club-shaped tip. They have fused lateral sepals (synsepals) which may be quite colorful : white, yellow, rose, purple, orange or tan with red, brown or purple overlaid frequently with contrasting reddish-purple spots or stripes. The long, lateral petals equally end in a thickened club-shaped tip. The long lip is ovoid and widest its apex. It shows the same variations in color and markings.

They are generally of tufted habit and white sheathed stems with fine papery bracts. Under the right conditions, they can be in flower all year long. They propagate by spreading and forming new plantlets, called keikis, from the base of mature leaves.

Several species, such as Restrepia muscifera, are very variable in size, shape and color. No two populations are the same.

== Species ==
Sixty-nine species are recognised as of May 2026.

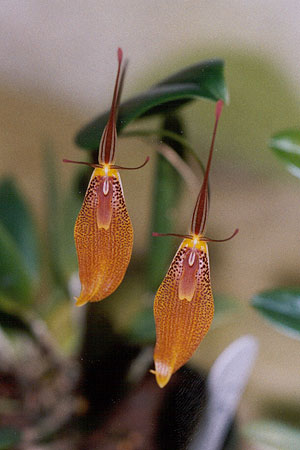
Elegant restrepia (Restrepia elegans)

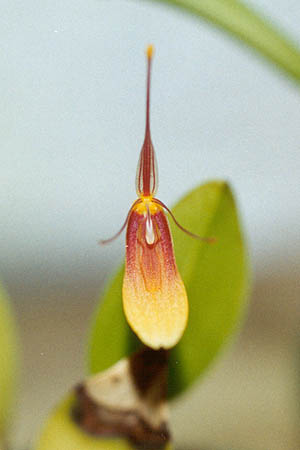
Hairy tongued restrepia (Restrepia trichoglossa)

- Restrepia aberrans (Panama).
- Restrepia antennifera : Antennae-carrying restrepia (W. South America to NW. Venezuela).
- Restrepia aristulifera (Venezuela).
- Restrepia archilarum (Guatemala)
- Restrepia aspasicensium (Colombia to NW. Venezuela).
- Restrepia brachypus : Short-column foot restrepia (W. South America to Venezuela).
- Restrepia chameleon : Color-changing restrepia (Colombia).
- Restrepia chocoensis : Chocó restrepia (Colombia).
- Restrepia chrysoglossa (Colombia).
- Restrepia citrina : Lemon-yellow restrepia (Colombia).
- Restrepia cloesii (Peru).
- Restrepia cobanensis (Guatemala)
- Restrepia condorensis : Condor-like restrepia (SE. Ecuador).
- Restrepia contorta : Twisted restrepia (W. South America).
- Restrepia cuprea : Copper-colored restrepia (Colombia).
- Restrepia cymbula (Ecuador).
- Restrepia devolvens (likely Western South America)
- Restrepia divaricata (likely Western South America)
- Restrepia dodsonii : Dodson's restrepia (Ecuador).
- Restrepia driessenii (Venezuela)
- Restrepia echinata (E. Colombia to Peru).
- Restrepia echo (Colombia).
- Restrepia elegans : Elegant restrepia (Colombia to NW. Venezuela).
- Restrepia ephippium (Ecuador).
- Restrepia escobariana (Colombia).
- Restrepia extensa (likely Western South America)
- Restrepia falkenbergii : Falkenberg's restrepia (Colombia).
- Restrepia fistulosa (likely Western South America)
- Restrepia flosculata : Small-flowered restrepia (Colombia to NW. Ecuador).
- Restrepia franciscoximenezii (Guatemala)
- Restrepia fritillina (Colombia)
- Restrepia guttulata : Small-spotted restrepia (Venezuela to Ecuador).
- Restrepia howei :
- Restrepia iris : Rainbow restrepia (SE. Ecuador).
- Restrepia jesupiana (Venezuela).
- Restrepia lansbergii (NW. Venezuela to NC. Peru).
- Restrepia limbata (Colombia).
- Restrepia mayana (Guatemala)
- Restrepia mendozae (SE. Ecuador).
- Restrepia metae (Colombia).
- Restrepia mohrii : Mohr's restrepia (Peru).
- Restrepia muscifera : Fly-carrying restrepia (S. Mexico to Ecuador).
- Restrepia nicolasii (Guatemala)
- Restrepia nittiorhyncha (Colombia).
- Restrepia pandurata (Colombia).
- Restrepia peetersii (Ecuador).
- Restrepia pelyx (Colombia).
- Restrepia persicina (Ecuador).
- Restrepia piperitosa (Peru).
- Restrepia portillae (Ecuador).
- Restrepia purpurea : Purple restrepia (Colombia).
- Restrepia radulifera (Venezuela).
- Restrepia renzii (Venezuela).
- Restrepia restrepoi (Colombia)
- Restrepia roseola : Rosy restrepia (Venezuela).
- Restrepia royi (Peru)
- Restrepia sanguinea : Blood red restrepia (Colombia).
- Restrepia santanderensis (Colombia)
- Restrepia schizosepala (NE. Ecuador).
- Restrepia seketii (Colombia).
- Restrepia tabeae : Tabe's restrepia (Colombia).
- Restrepia teaguei : Teague's restrepia (Ecuador).
- Restrepia tenebricosa (likely Western South America)
- Restrepia trichoglossa : Hairy tongued restrepia (Mexico - Chiapas to Ecuador)
- Restrepia tsubotae (Colombia).
- Restrepia valverdei (Guatemala)
- Restrepia vasquezgarciae (Guatemala)
- Restrepia vasquezii : Vasquez' restrepia (Bolivia).
- Restrepia wageneri (NW. Venezuela).

=== Formerly accepted species ===
- Restrepia tentaculata - now synonym of Lindleyalis tentaculata (Poepp. & Endl.) Luer 2004

== Gallery ==
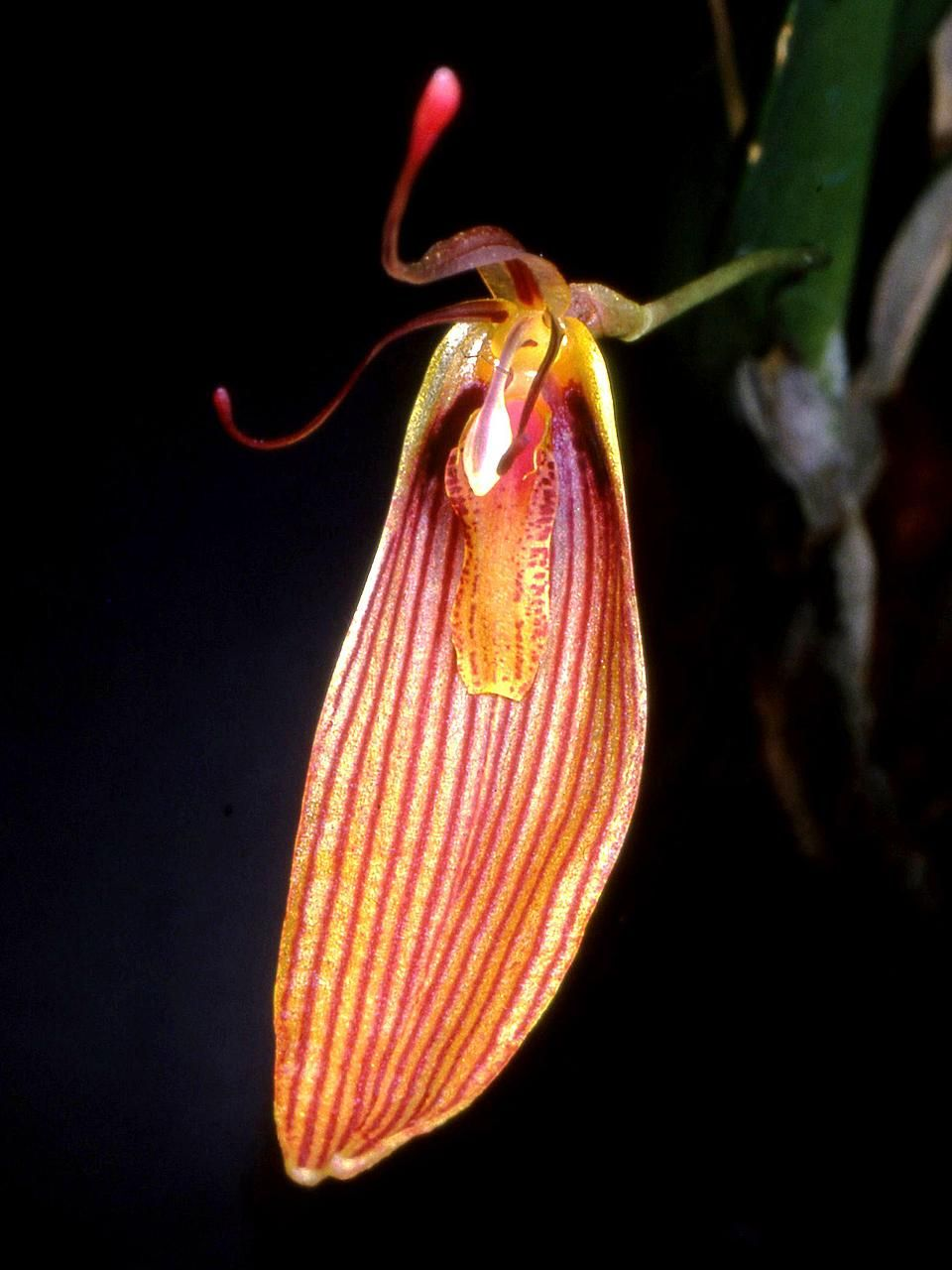
Restrepia antennifera

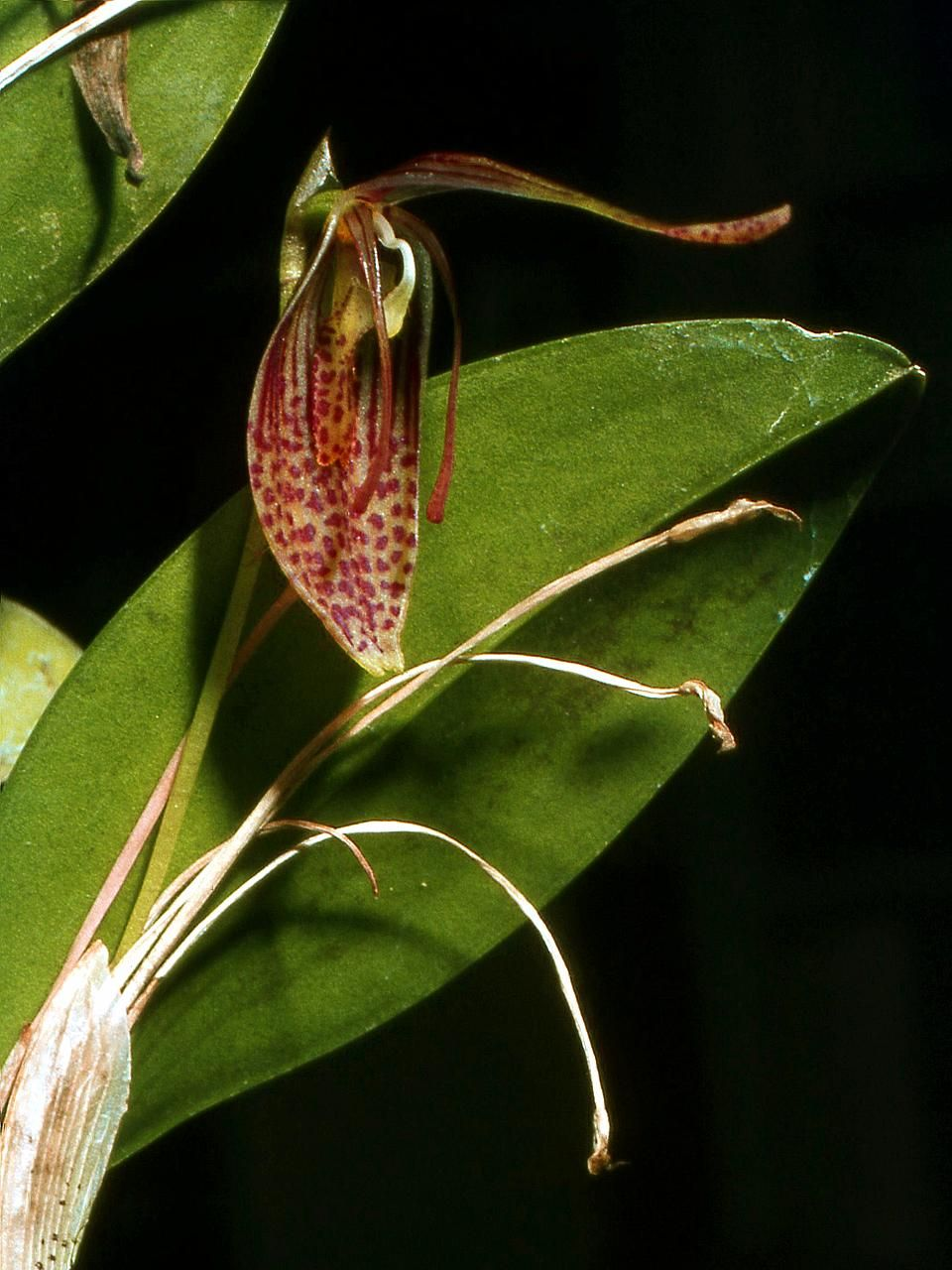
Restrepia aristulifera

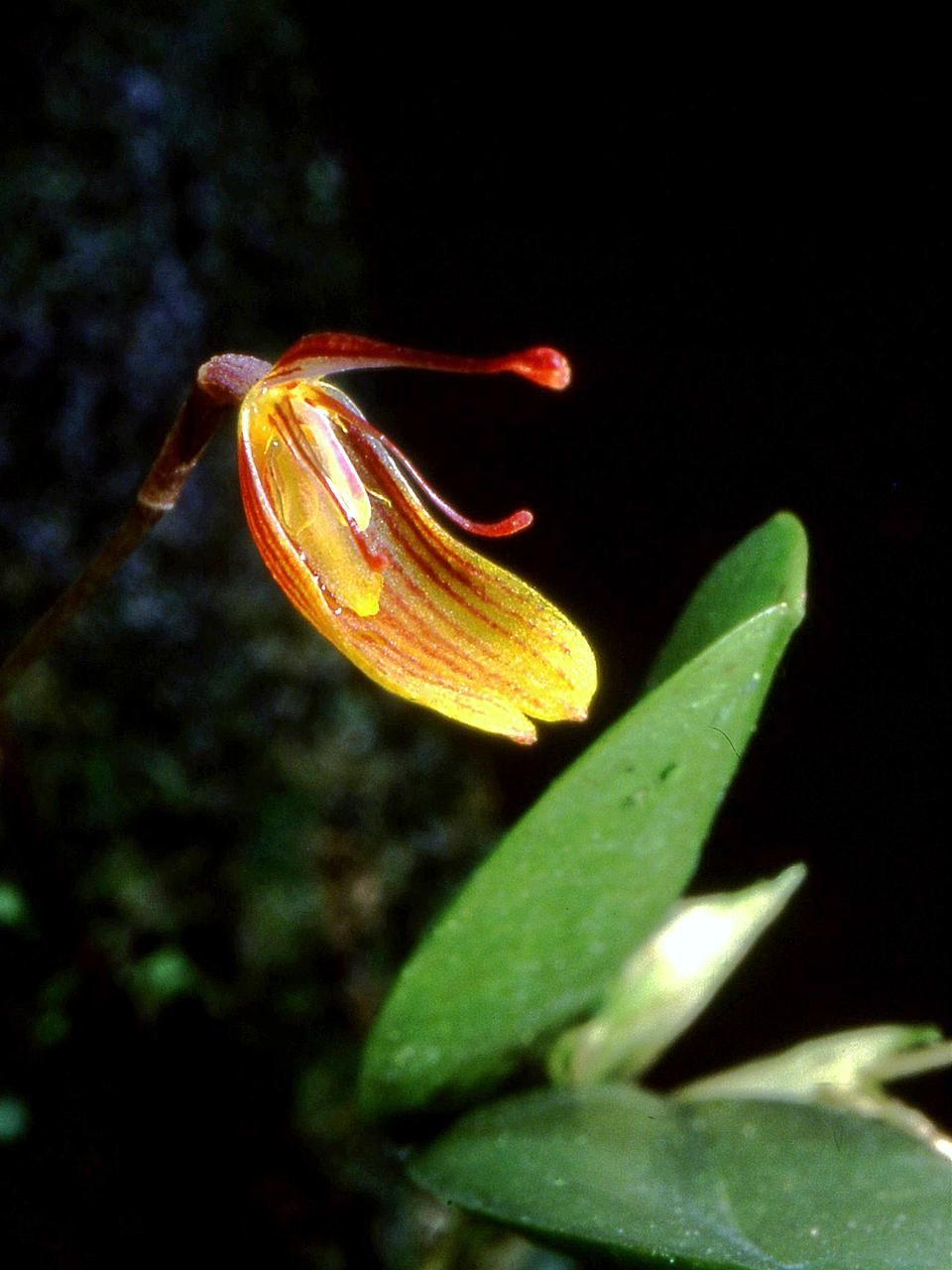
Restrepia aspasicensium

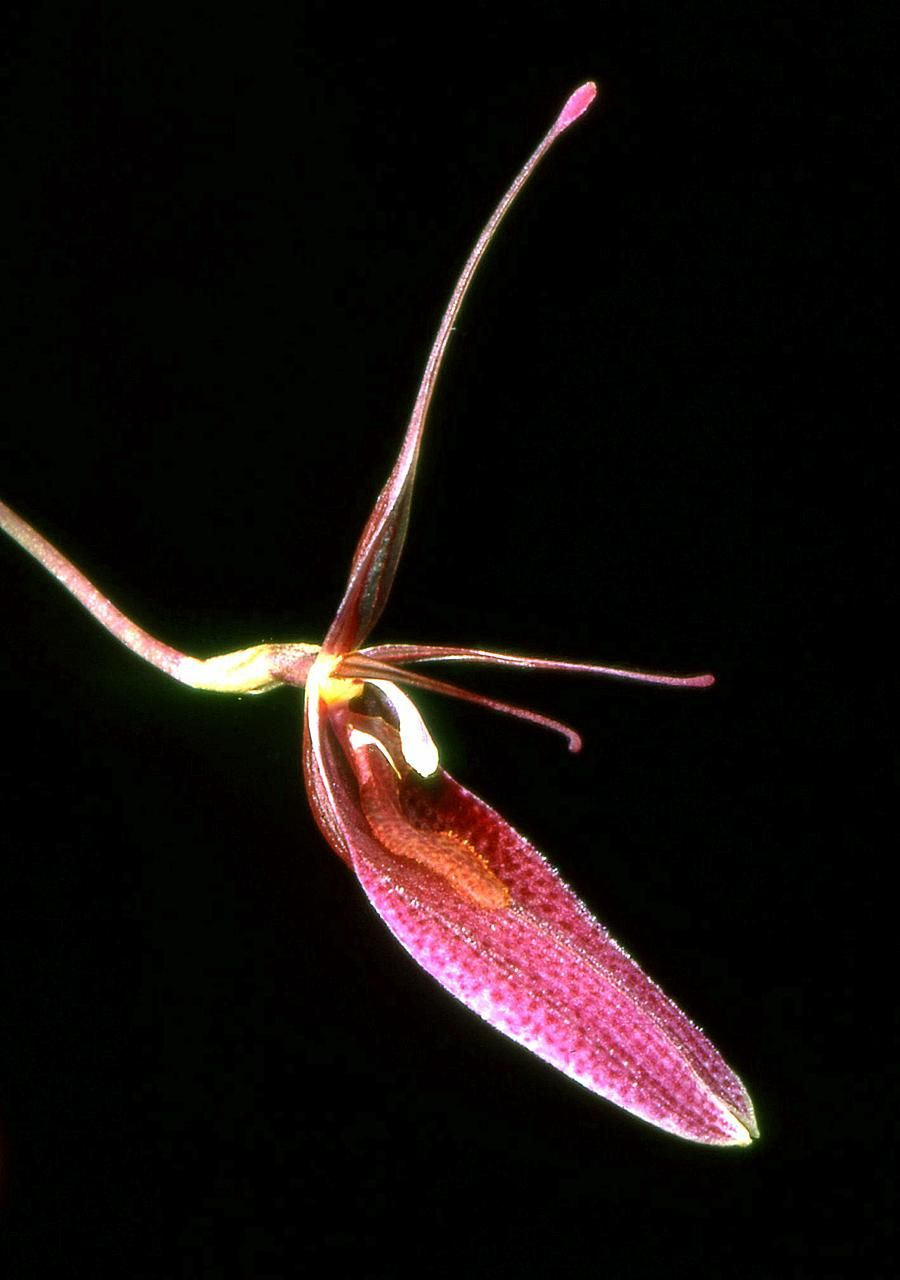
Restrepia brachypus

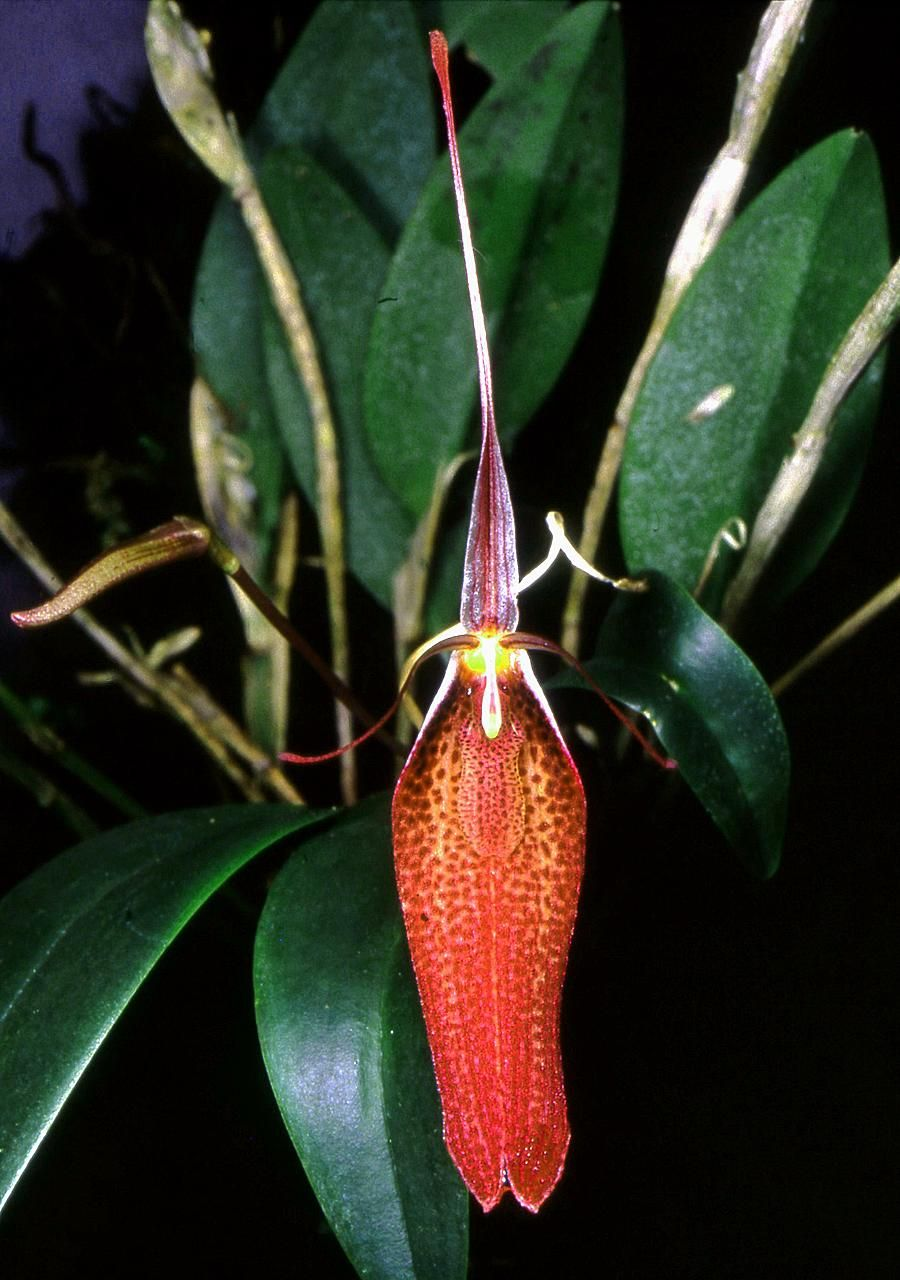
Restrepia contorta

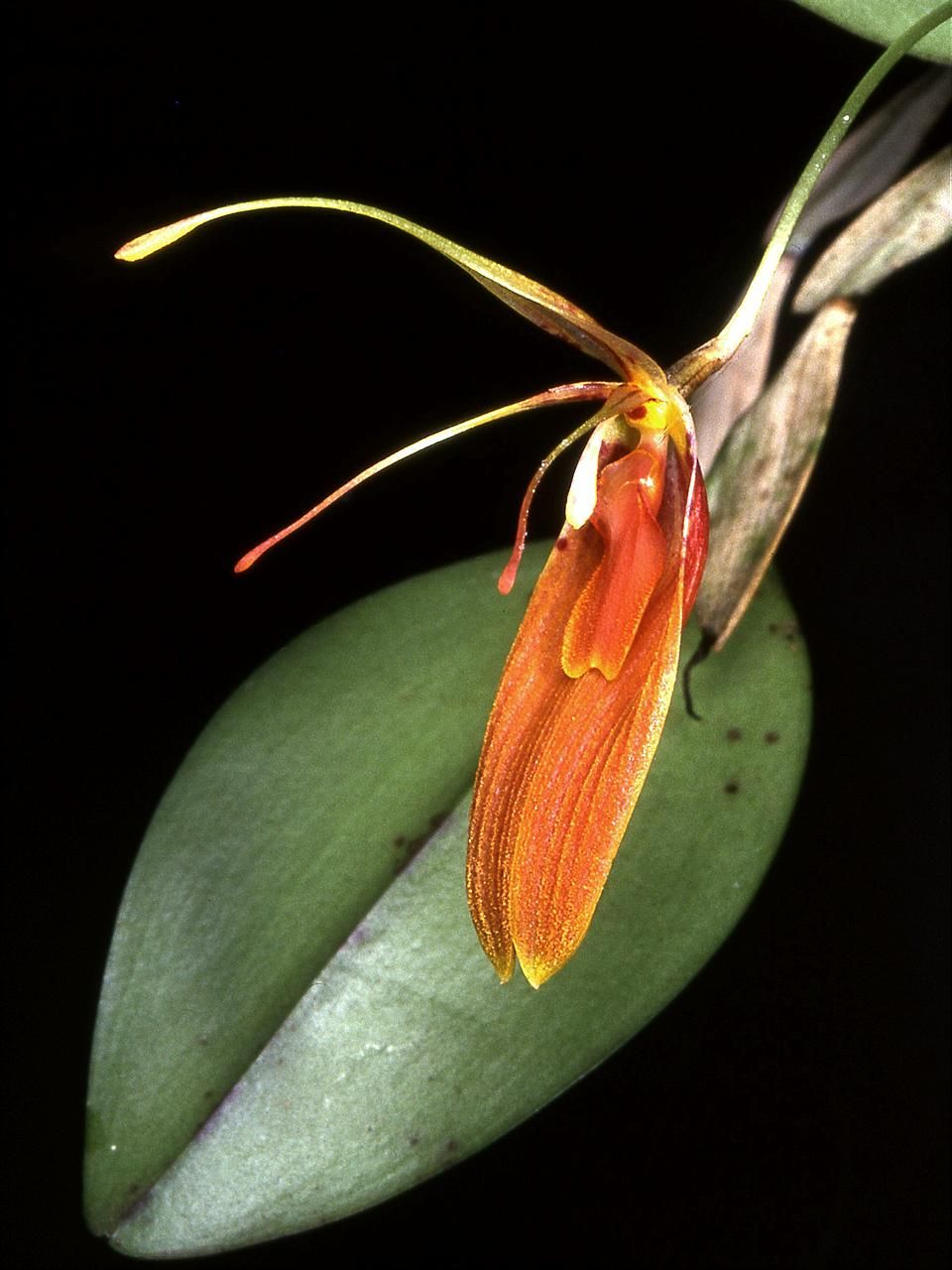
Restrepia cuprea

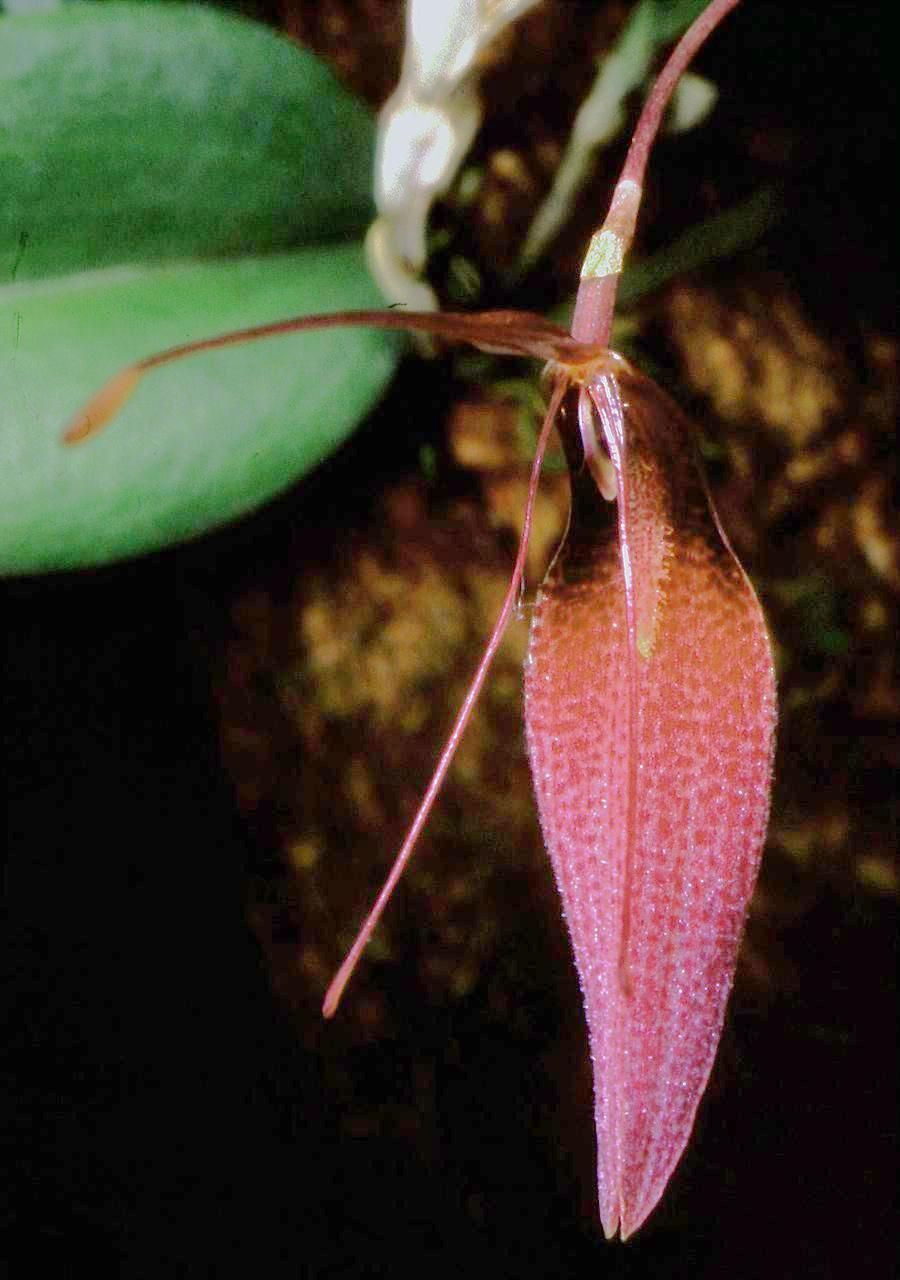
Restrepia dodsonii

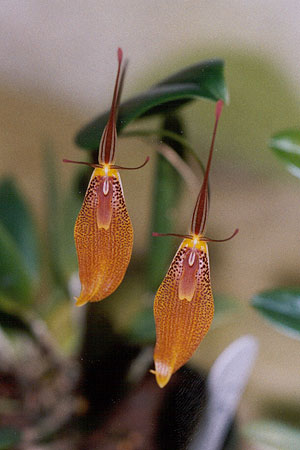
Restrepia elegans

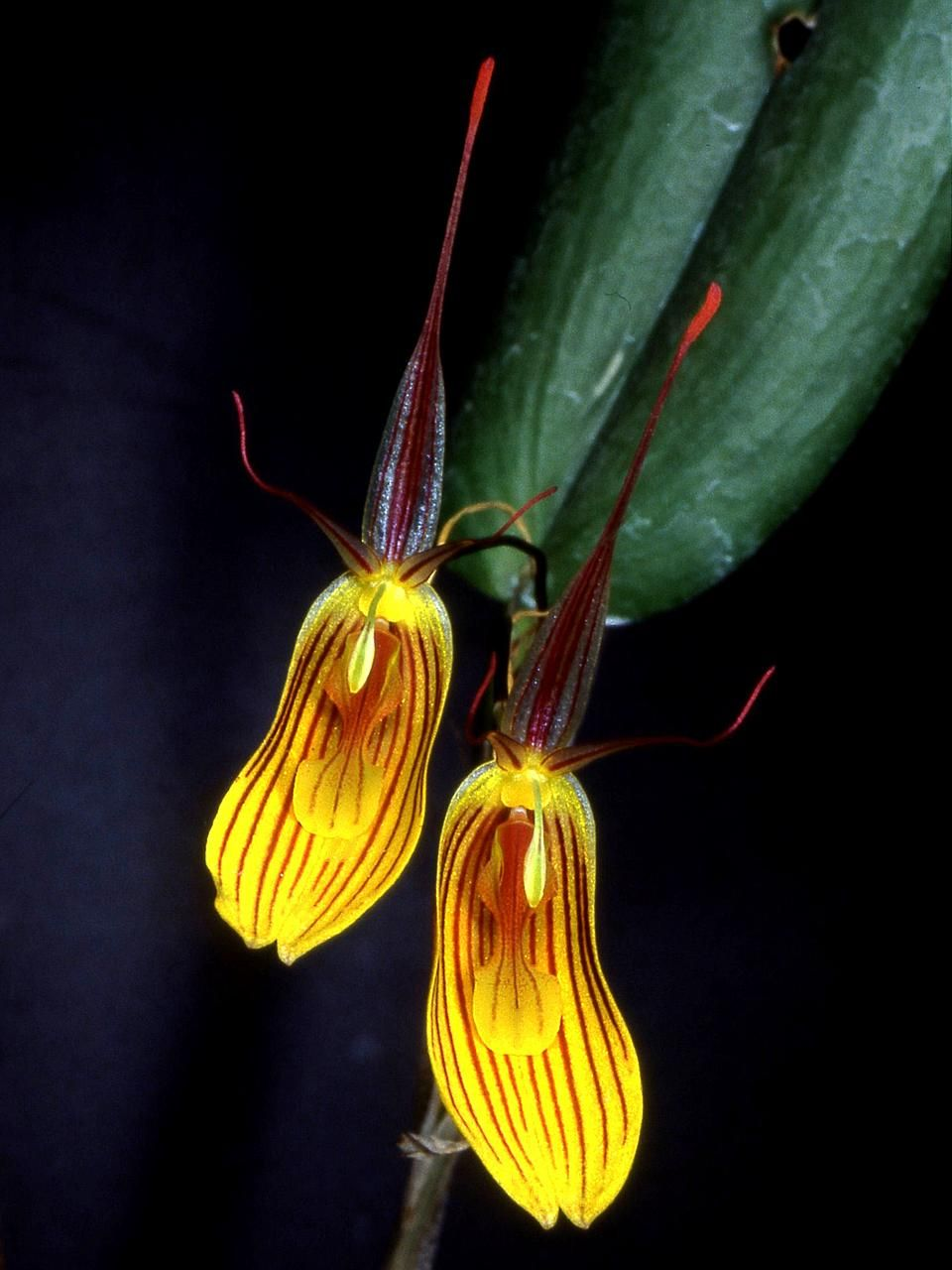
Restrepia falkenbergii

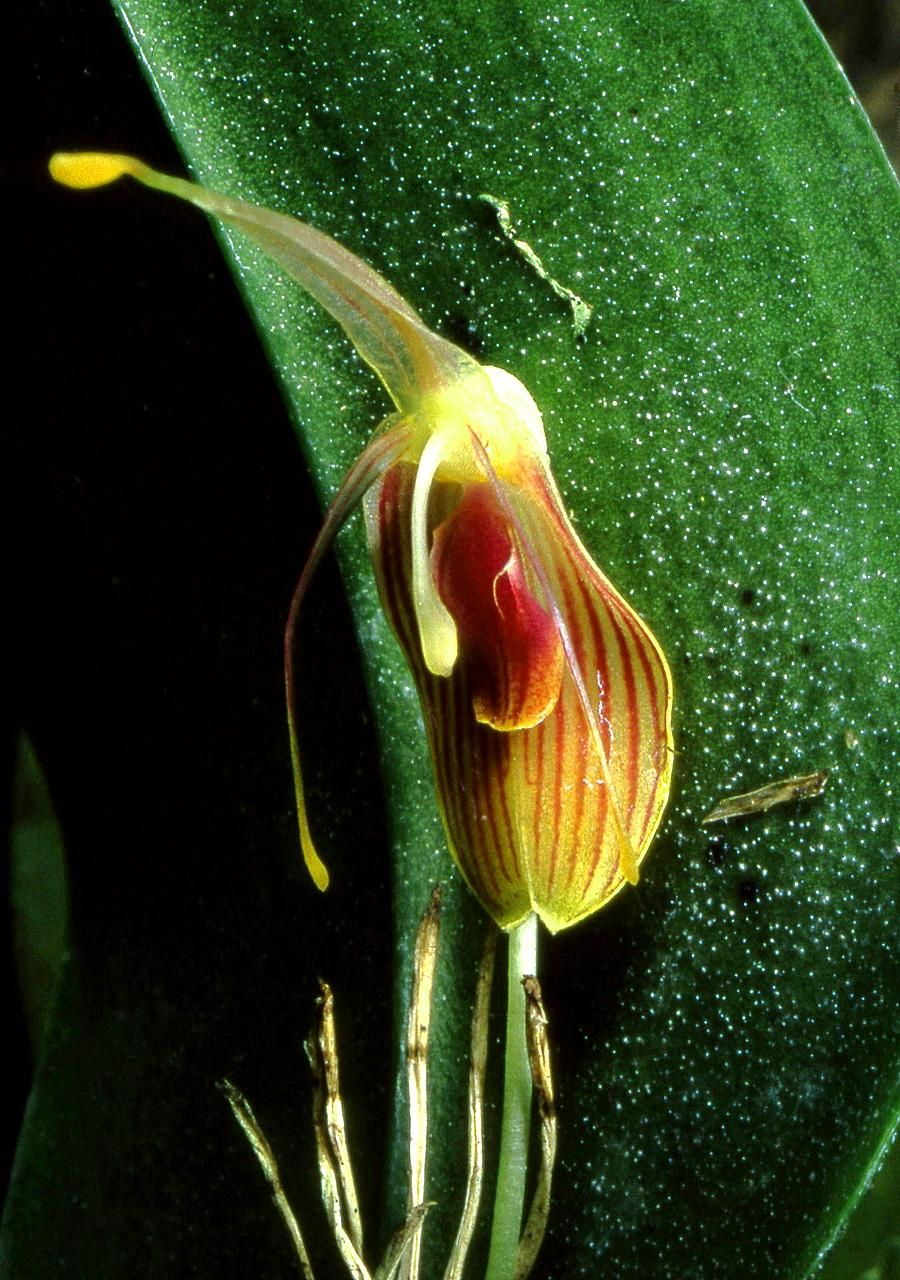
Restrepia flosculata

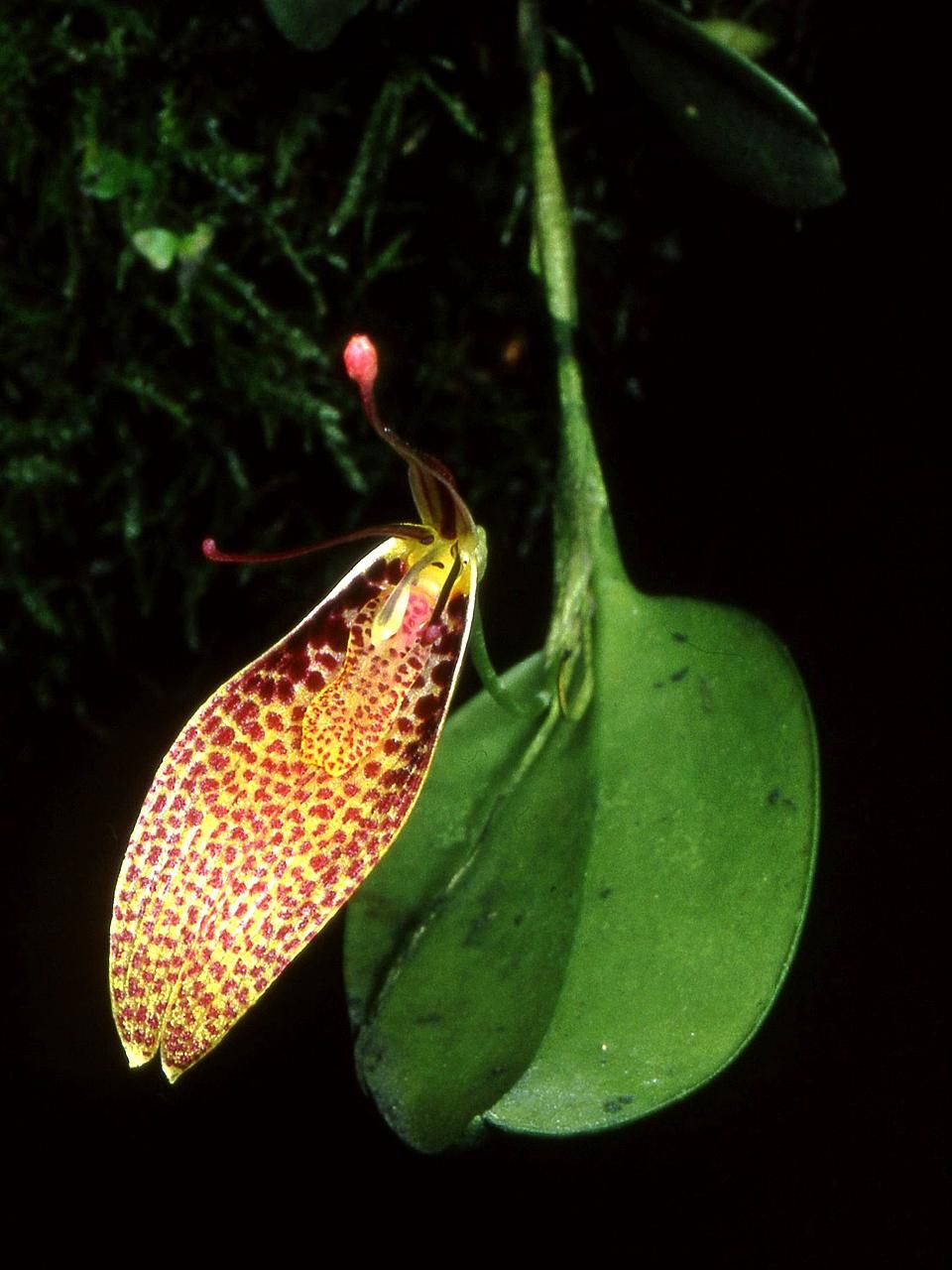
Restrepia guttulata

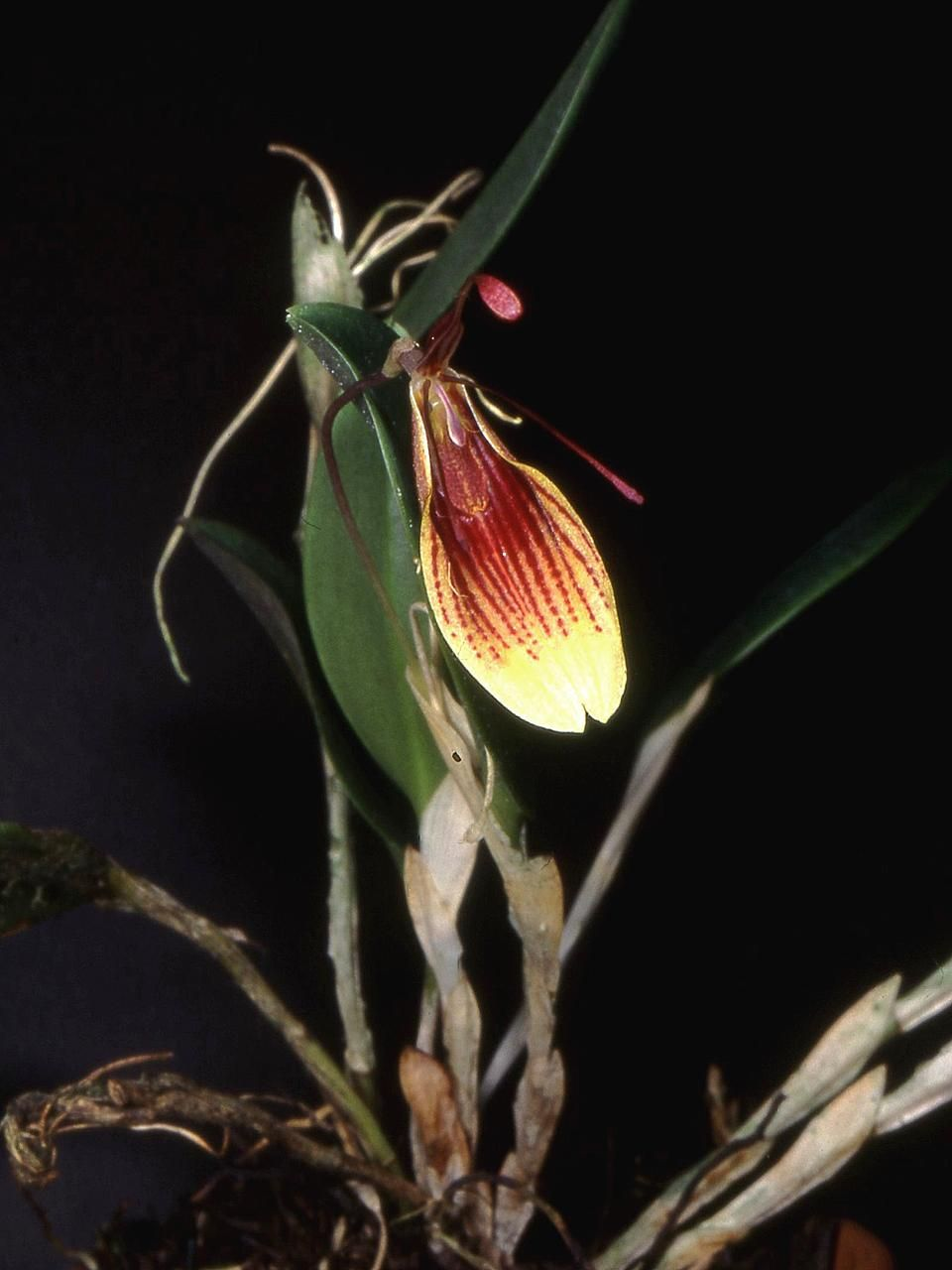
Restrepia iris

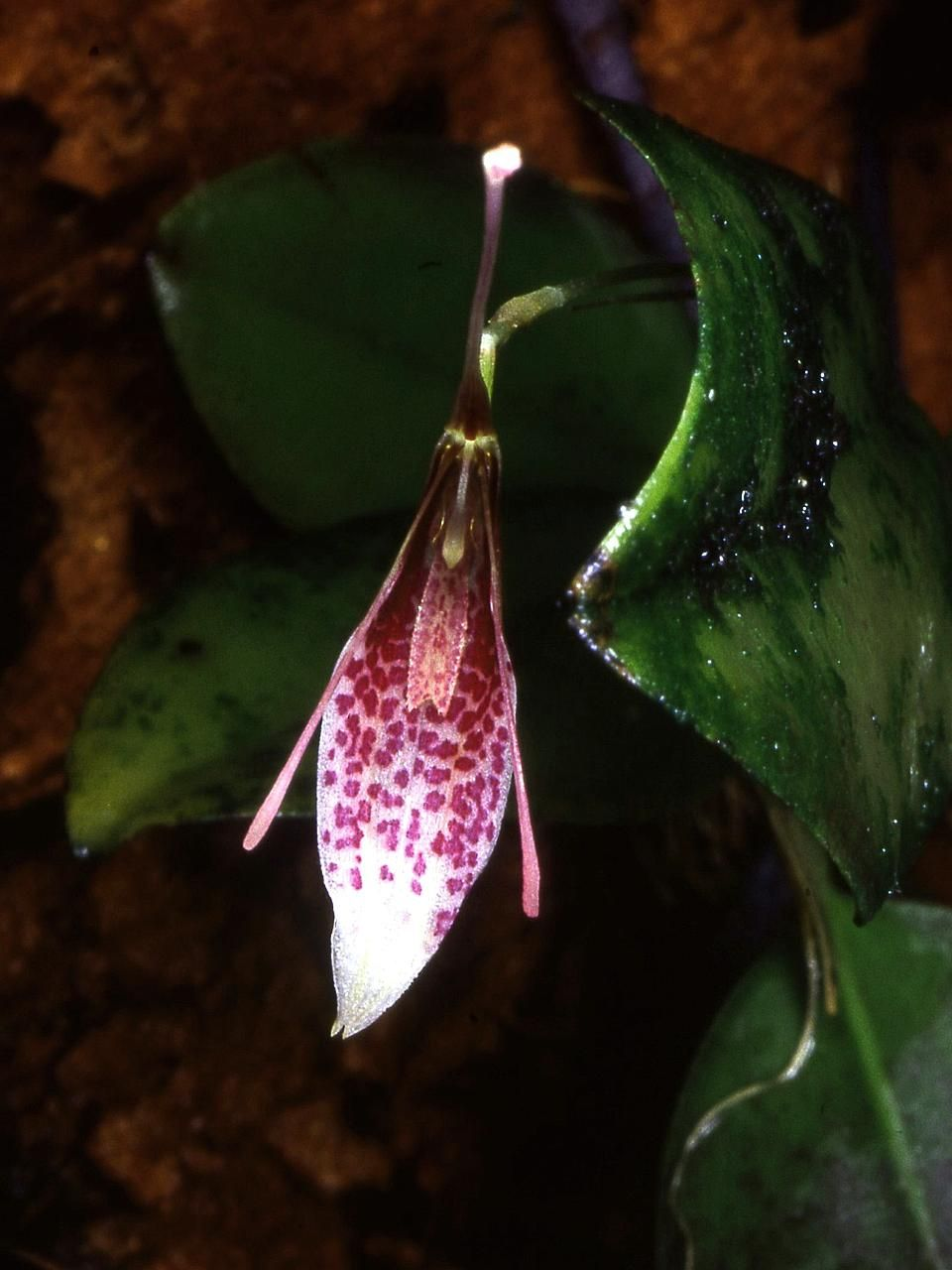
Restrepia lansbergii

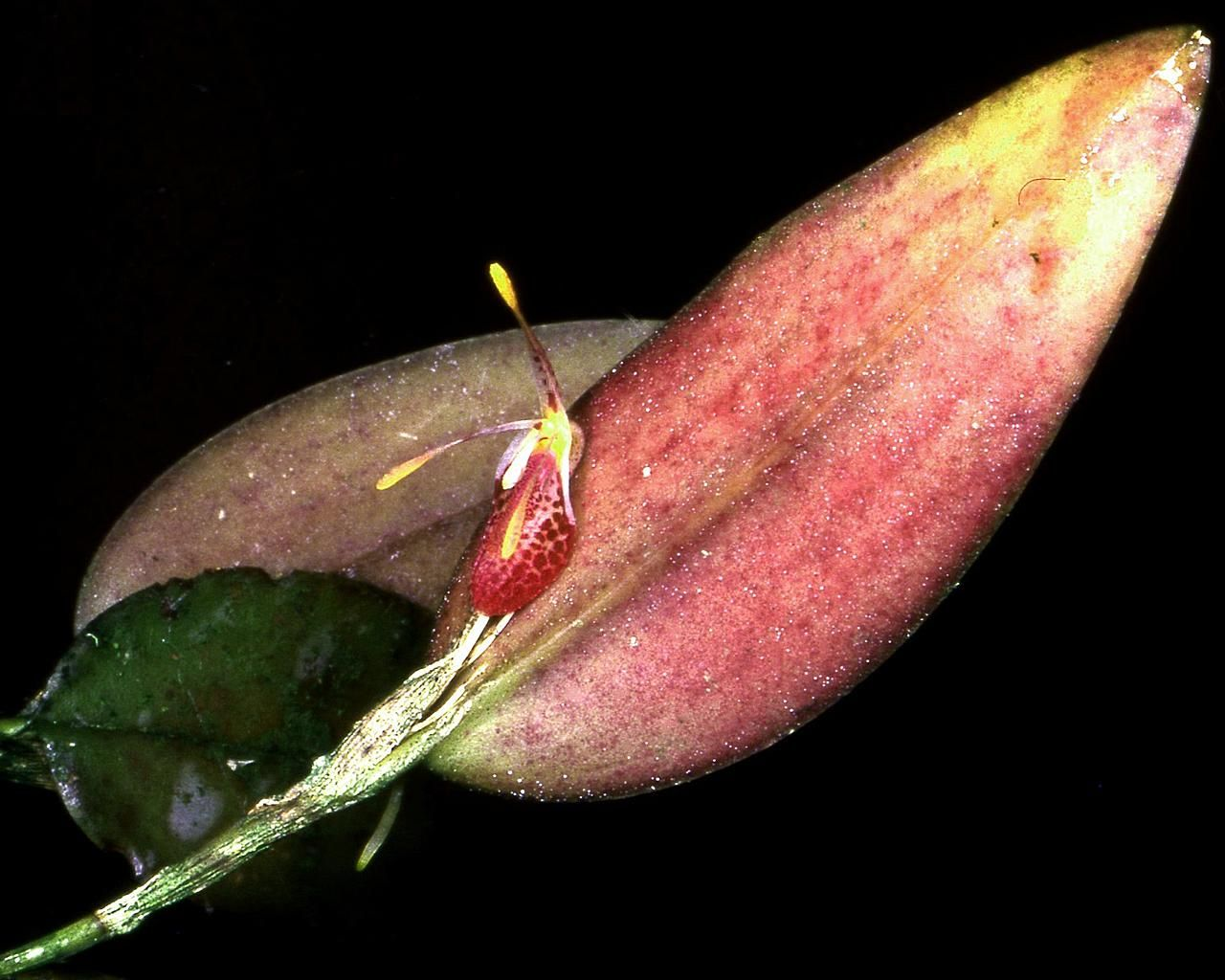
Restrepia muscifera

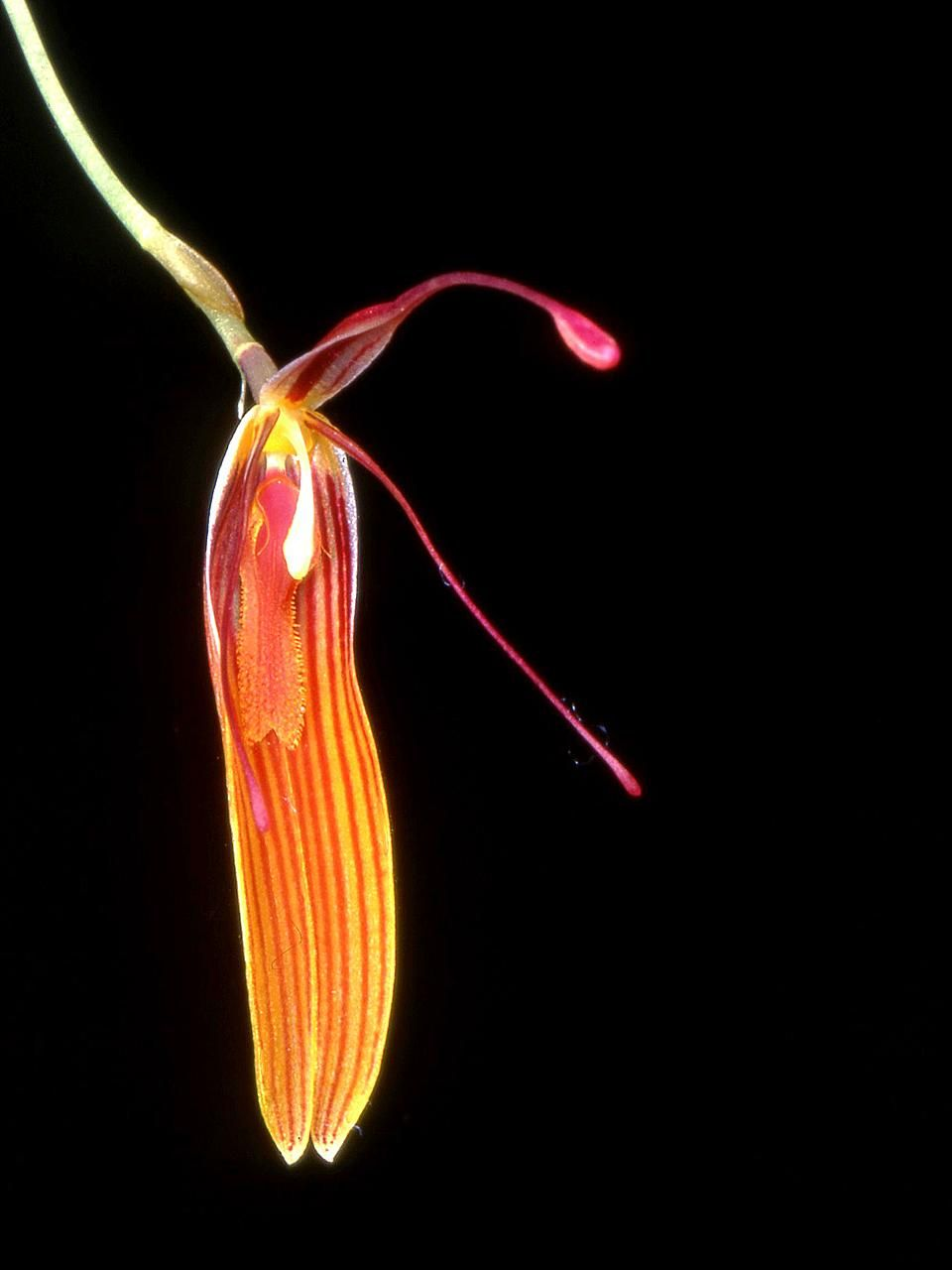
Restrepia nittiorhyncha

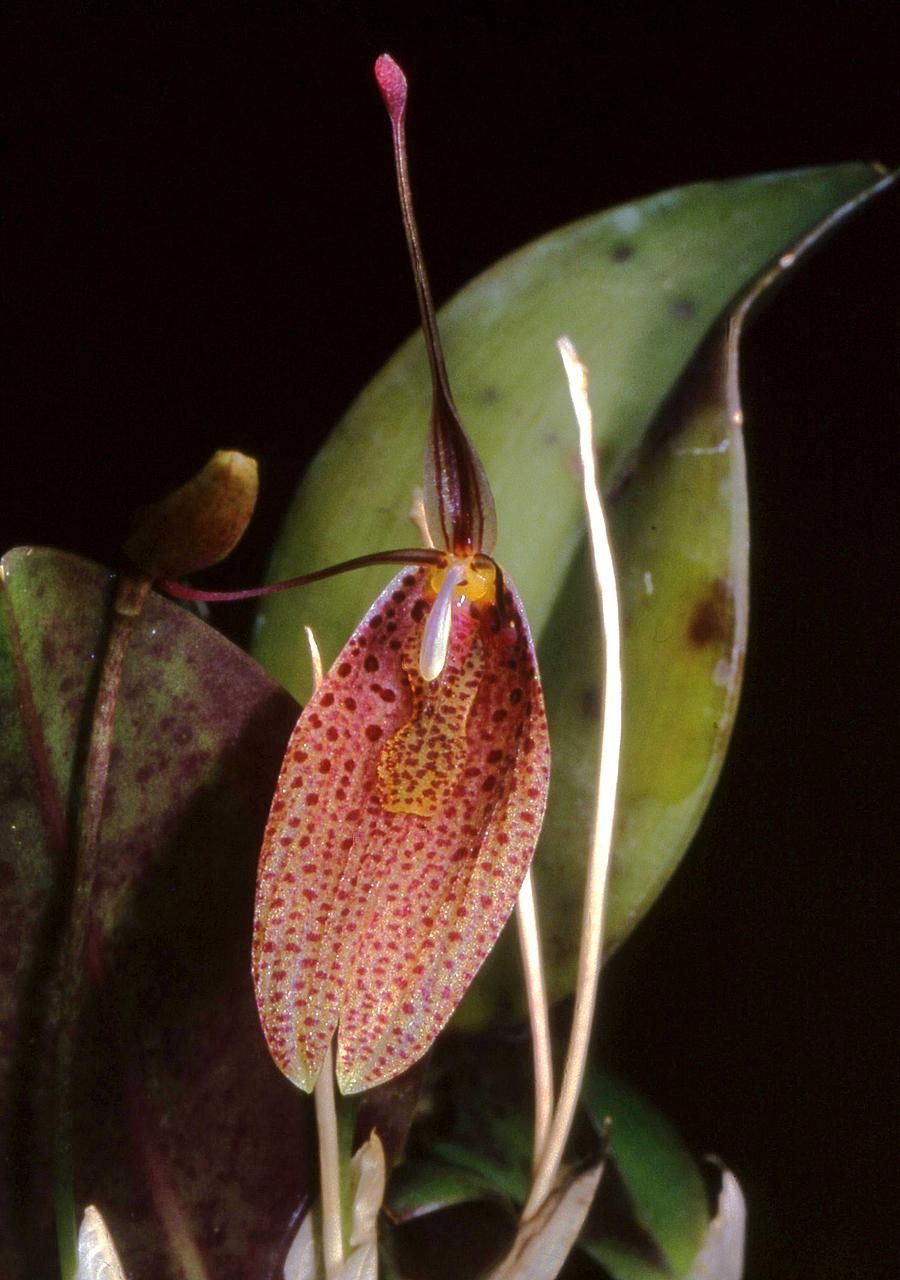
Restrepia pandurata

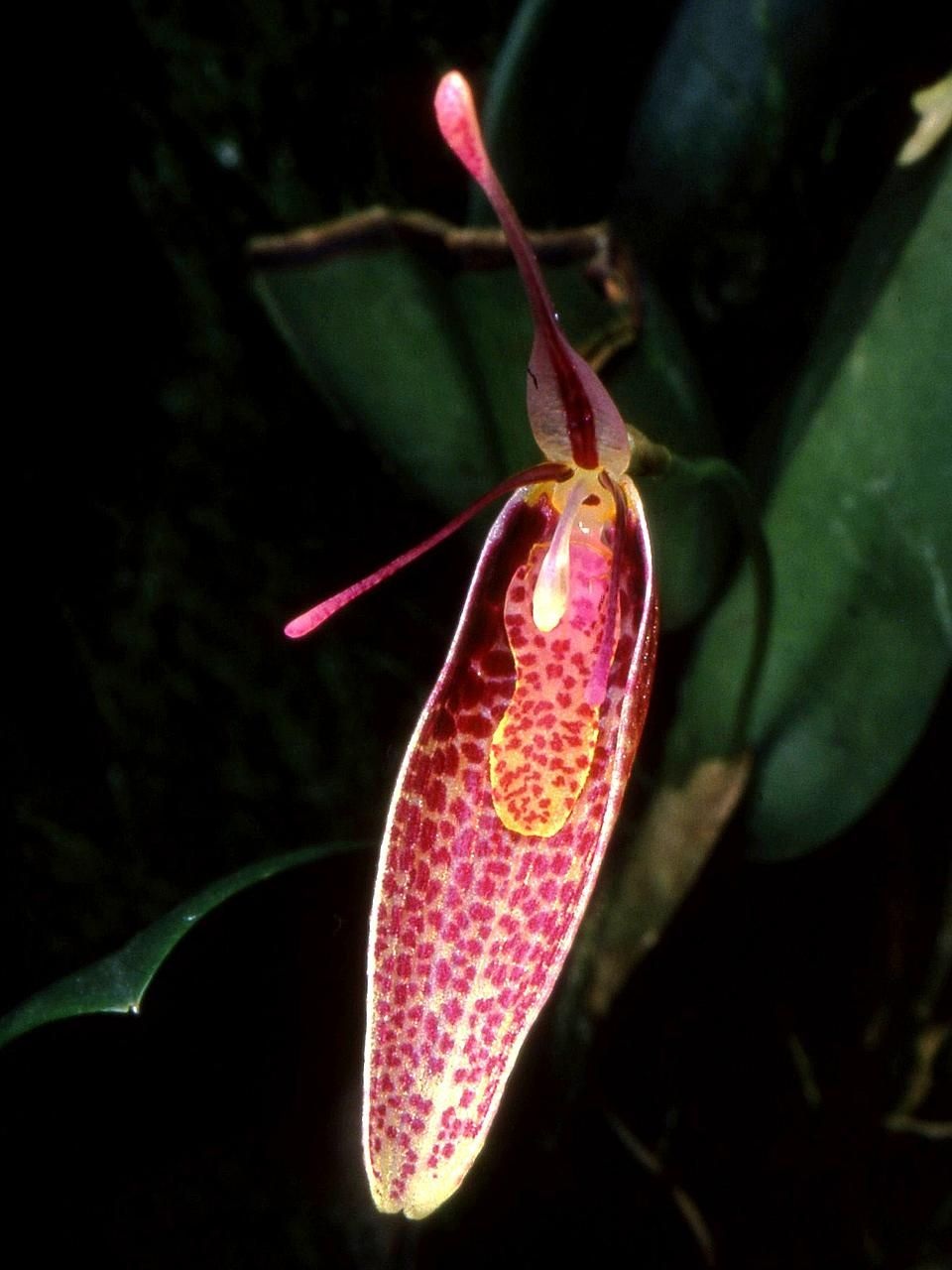
Restrepia roseola

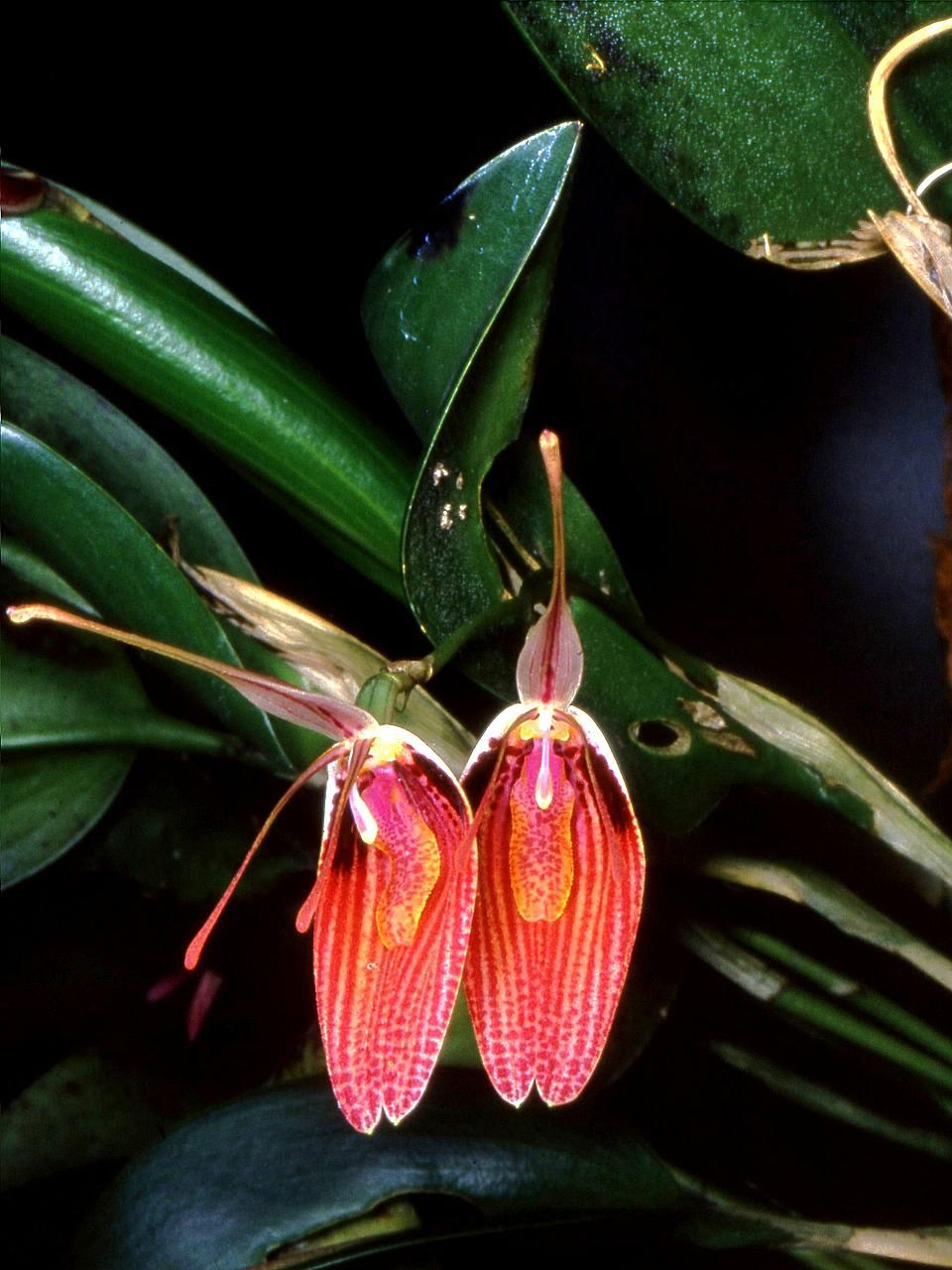
Restrepia sanguinea

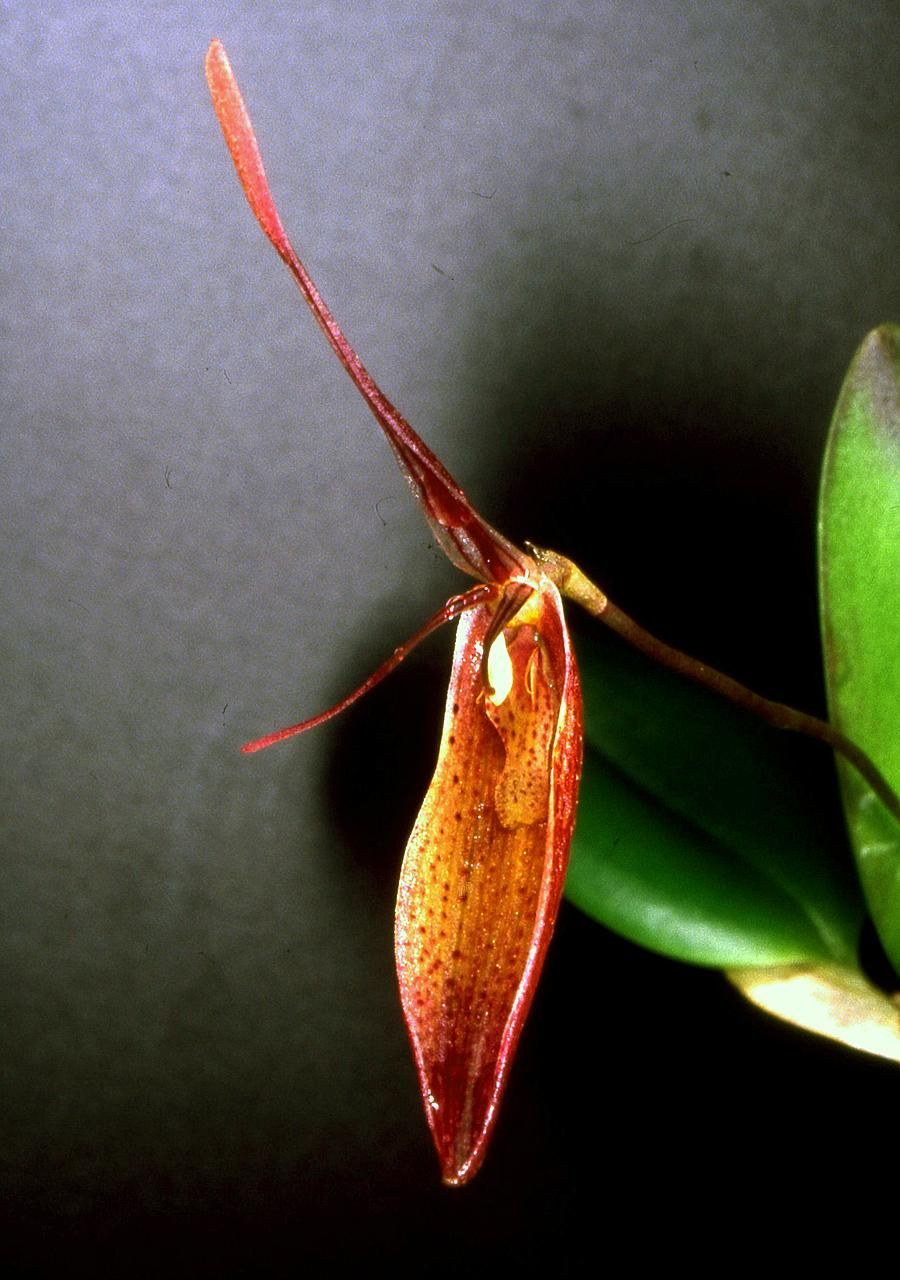
Restrepia teaguei

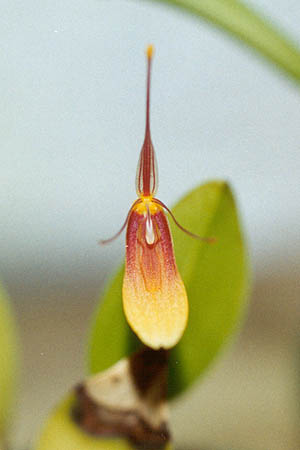
Restrepia trichoglossa

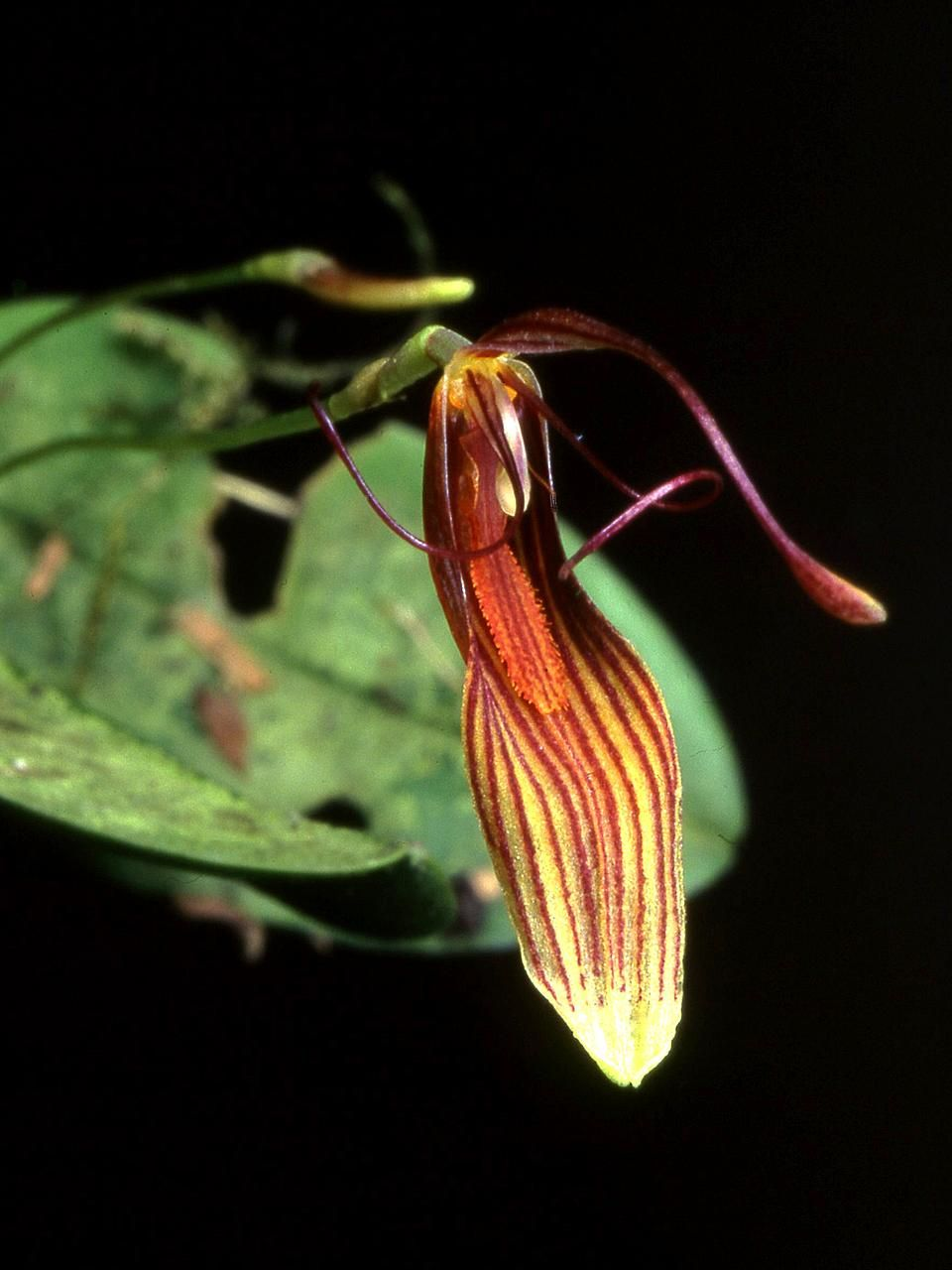
Restrepia wageneri
