= Restrepia condorensis =

Conservation status
- CITES Appendix II

Scientific classification
- Kingdom: Plantae
- Clade: Tracheophytes
- Clade: Angiosperms
- Clade: Monocots
- Order: Asparagales
- Family: Orchidaceae
- Subfamily: Epidendroideae
- Genus: Restrepia
- Species: R. condorensis

Binomial name
- Restrepia condorensis Luer & Escobar

Species of flowering plant

Restrepia condorensis is a species of flowering plant in the orchid family.

The species is native to the Cordillera del Cóndor (Condor mountain range), in south-eastern Ecuador. It is found in wet tropical areas.

Restrepia condorensis is an epiphyte.

== Taxonomy ==
Restrepia condorensis was named by Carlyle A. Luer & Rodrigo Escobar in 1996. The holotype was collected in the Cordillera del Cóndor region of Ecuador, and the specimen flowered in cultivation.

== Conservation ==
Restrepia condorensis is listed in Appendix II of CITES. There are no quotas or suspensions in place for the species.
