= Restrepia renzii =

Conservation status
- CITES Appendix II

Scientific classification
- Kingdom: Plantae
- Clade: Tracheophytes
- Clade: Angiosperms
- Clade: Monocots
- Order: Asparagales
- Family: Orchidaceae
- Subfamily: Epidendroideae
- Genus: Restrepia
- Species: R. renzii

Binomial name
- Restrepia renzii Luer

Species of flowering plant

Restrepia renzii is a species of flowering plant in the family Orchidaceae. It is an epiphyte native to Venezuela.

The species was described in 1996, and is listed in Appendix II of CITES.

== Taxonomy ==
Restrepia renzii was described by Carlyle A. Luer in 1996. The holotype was collected in Mérida, Venezuela, at an elevation of 2,400 metres (7,900 ft), by J. Renz.

== Distribution ==
Restrepia renzii is native to the wet tropical biome of Mérida, Venezuela.

== Conservation ==
Restrepia renzii is listed in Appendix II of CITES. There are no quotas or suspensions in place for the species.
