= Restrepia fritillina =

Conservation status
- CITES Appendix II

Scientific classification
- Kingdom: Plantae
- Clade: Tracheophytes
- Clade: Angiosperms
- Clade: Monocots
- Order: Asparagales
- Family: Orchidaceae
- Subfamily: Epidendroideae
- Genus: Restrepia
- Species: R. fritillina

Binomial name
- Restrepia fritillina Luer & V.N.M.Rao

Species of flowering plant

Restrepia fritillina is a species of flowering plant in the family Orchidaceae. It is an epiphyte native to Colombia.

The species was described in 2007, and is listed in Appendix II of CITES.

== Taxonomy ==
Restrepia fritillina was described by Carlyle A. Luer and Velliyur Nott Mallikarjuna Rao in 2007. Rao collected the holotype from Colombia. It flowered in 2007, when cultivated in Wilmington, Delaware.

== Distribution ==
Restrepia fritillina is native to the wet tropical biome of Colombia.

== Conservation ==
Restrepia fritillina is listed in Appendix II of CITES. There are no quotas or suspensions in place for the species.
