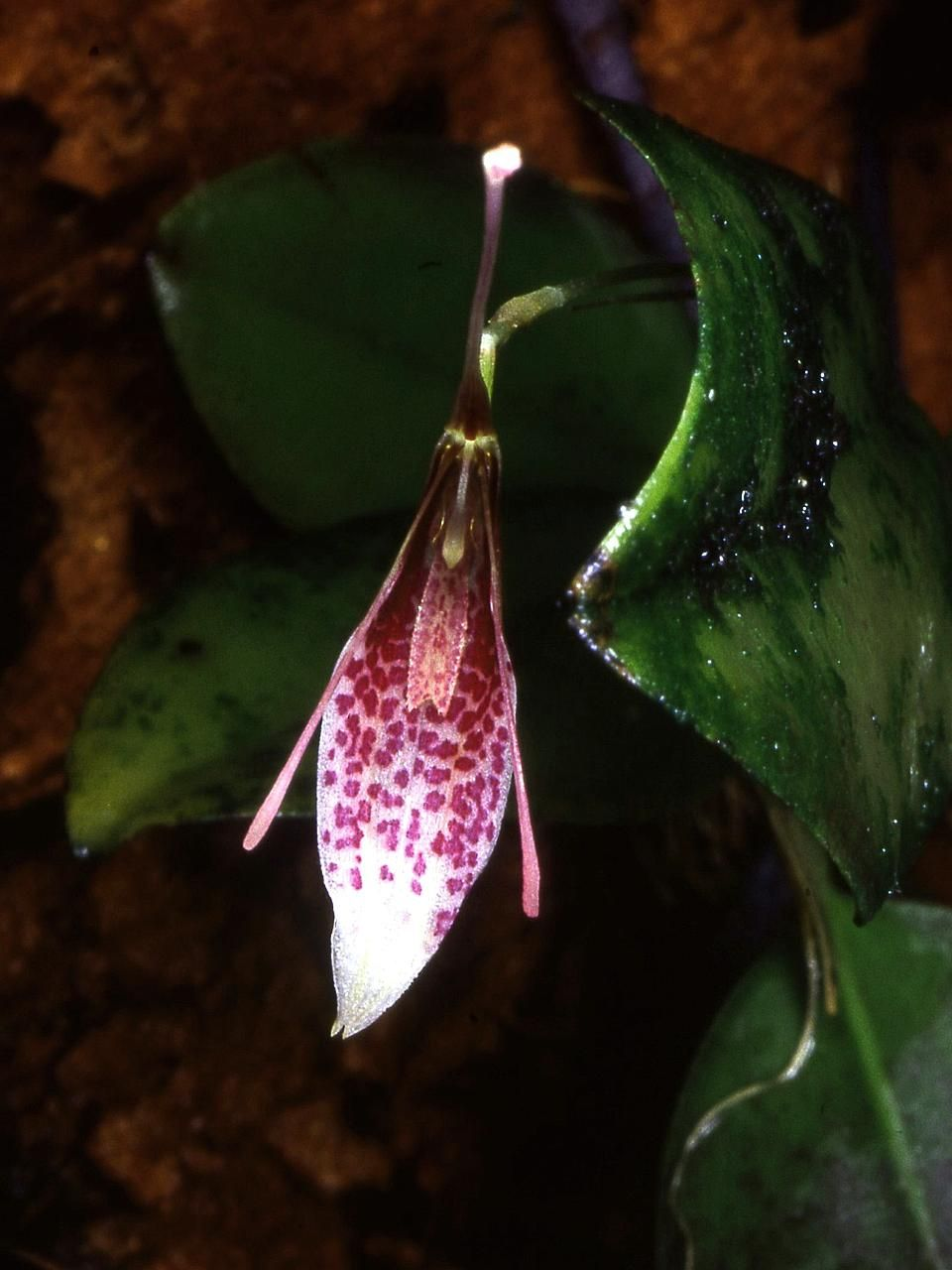
- Flower of Restrepia lansbergii

Conservation status
- CITES Appendix II

Scientific classification
- Kingdom: Plantae
- Clade: Tracheophytes
- Clade: Angiosperms
- Clade: Monocots
- Order: Asparagales
- Family: Orchidaceae
- Subfamily: Epidendroideae
- Genus: Restrepia
- Species: R. lansbergii

Binomial name
- Restrepia lansbergii Rchb.f. & Wagenitz

= Restrepia lansbergii =

Species of orchid

Restrepia lansbergii Hook. is a synonym of Restrepia muscifera.

Restrepia lansbergii is a species of orchid found from northwestern Venezuela to north-central Peru.

It was described in 1854.

Restrepia lansbergii is listed in Appendix II of CITES. There are no quotas or suspensions in place for the species.
