= Restrepia mayana =

Conservation status
- CITES Appendix II

Scientific classification
- Kingdom: Plantae
- Clade: Tracheophytes
- Clade: Angiosperms
- Clade: Monocots
- Order: Asparagales
- Family: Orchidaceae
- Subfamily: Epidendroideae
- Genus: Restrepia
- Species: R. mayana

Binomial name
- Restrepia mayana Archila, Chiron & Szlach.

Species of flowering plant

Restrepia mayana is a species of flowering plant in the family Orchidaceae. It is an epiphyte native to Guatemala.

The species was described in 2013, and is listed in Appendix II of CITES.

== Distribution ==
Restrepia mayana is native to the wet tropical biome of Guatemala.

== Taxonomy ==
Restrepia mayana was described in 2013, by Fredy Archila, Guy Robert Chiron, and Dariusz Szlachetko. The type material was collected in Guatemala in 1994.

== Conservation ==
Restrepia mayana is listed in Appendix II of CITES. There are no quotas or suspensions in place for the species.
