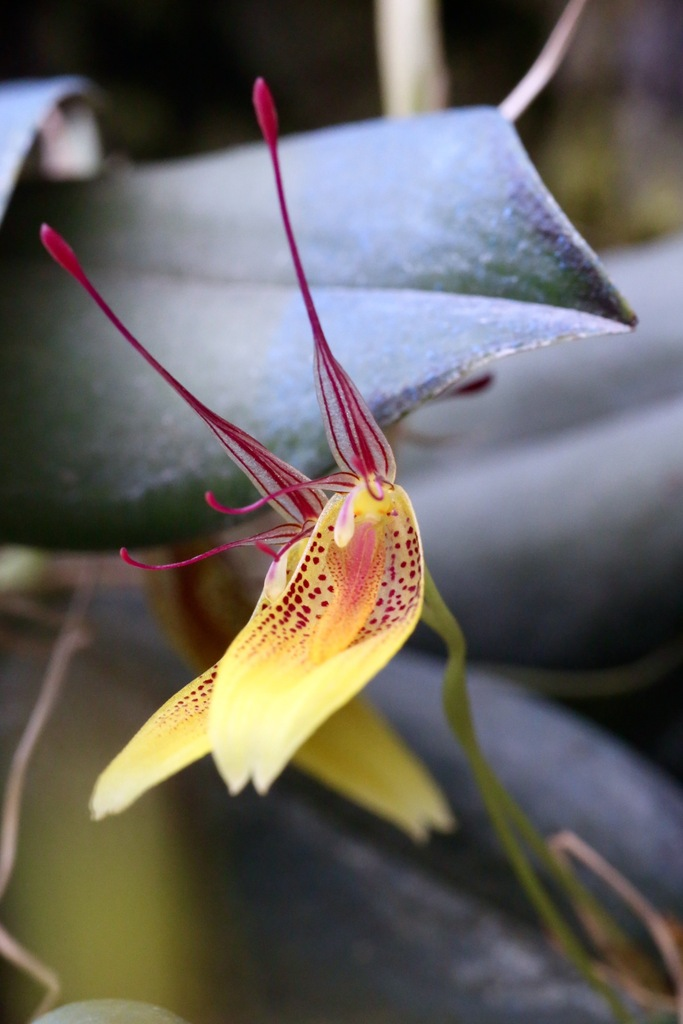

Conservation status
- CITES Appendix II

Scientific classification
- Kingdom: Plantae
- Clade: Tracheophytes
- Clade: Angiosperms
- Clade: Monocots
- Order: Asparagales
- Family: Orchidaceae
- Subfamily: Epidendroideae
- Genus: Restrepia
- Species: R. metae

Binomial name
- Restrepia metae Luer

= Restrepia metae =

Species of flowering plant

Restrepia metae is a species of flowering plant in the family Orchidaceae. It is an epiphyte native to Colombia. The species was described in 1996, and is listed in Appendix II of CITES.

== Taxonomy ==
Restrepia metae was described by Carlyle A. Luer in 1996. The holotype was collected in Meta, Colombia, at an elevation of 550 metres (1,800 ft).

== Distribution ==
Restrepia metae is native to the wet tropical biome of Colombia's Meta Department.

== Conservation ==
Restrepia metae is listed in Appendix II of CITES. There are no suspensions or quotas in place for the species.
