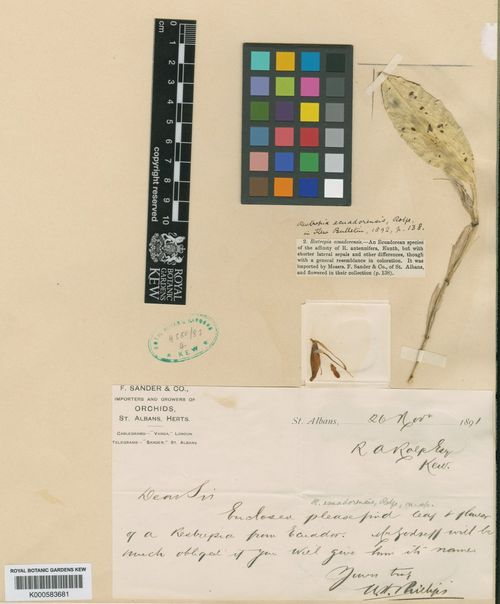

Conservation status
- CITES Appendix II

Scientific classification
- Kingdom: Plantae
- Clade: Tracheophytes
- Clade: Angiosperms
- Clade: Monocots
- Order: Asparagales
- Family: Orchidaceae
- Subfamily: Epidendroideae
- Genus: Restrepia
- Species: R. echo

Binomial name
- Restrepia echo Luer & R.Escobar

= Restrepia echo =

Species of flowering plant

Restrepia echo is a species of flowering plant in the order Orchidaceae. It is an epiphyte native to the wet tropical biome of Colombia's Antioquia Department.

== Taxonomy ==
The type specimens of Restrepia echo were collected in September 1992. A specimen flowered in cultivation.

The species was described by Carlyle A. Luer and Rodrigo Escobar in 1996.

== Conservation ==
Restrepia echo is listed in Appendix II of CITES. There are no quotas or suspensions in place for the species.
