= Restrepia valverdei =

Conservation status
- CITES Appendix II

Scientific classification
- Kingdom: Plantae
- Clade: Embryophytes
- Clade: Tracheophytes
- Clade: Spermatophytes
- Clade: Angiosperms
- Clade: Monocots
- Order: Asparagales
- Family: Orchidaceae
- Subfamily: Epidendroideae
- Genus: Restrepia
- Species: R. valverdei

Binomial name
- Restrepia valverdei Archila, Jiménez Rodr. & Véliz

Species of flowering plant

Restrepia valverdei is a species of flowering plant in the family Orchidaceae. It is an epiphyte native to Guatemala. The species was described in 2015, and is listed in Appendix II of CITES.

== Taxonomy ==
The species was described by Fredy Archila, Francisco Jiménez Rodríguez, and Mario Esteban Véliz Pérez in 2015. The holotype was collected in 2000, from an elevation of around 1,000 metres (3,300 ft), in El Estor, Guatemala.

== Distribution ==
Restrepia valverdei is native to the wet tropical biome of Guatemala.

== Description ==
Restrepia valverdei is an epiphyte.

== Conservation ==
Restrepia valverdei is listed in Appendix II of CITES. There are no quotas or suspensions in place for the species.

== Etymology ==
Restrepia valverdei is named for Edwin Castro Valverde.
