= Restrepia vasquezgarciae =

Scientific classification
- Kingdom: Plantae
- Clade: Tracheophytes
- Clade: Angiosperms
- Clade: Monocots
- Order: Asparagales
- Family: Orchidaceae
- Subfamily: Epidendroideae
- Genus: Restrepia
- Species: R. vasquezgarciae

Binomial name
- Restrepia vasquezgarciae Archila, Chiron & Reyes V.

Species of flowering plant

Restrepia vasquezgarciae is a species of flowering plant in the family Orchidaceae. It is an epiphyte.

The species is native to Guatemala, and was described in 2019.

== Taxonomy ==
Fredy Archila, Guy Robert Chiron, and Rodolfo Reyes Villatoro described the species in 2019. Archila collected the type specimen from Alta Verapaz, Guatemala, in 2010.

== Distribution ==
Restrepia vasquezgarciae is native to the wet tropical biome of Guatemala.

== Etymology ==
The species is named after Antonio Vásquez-García.
