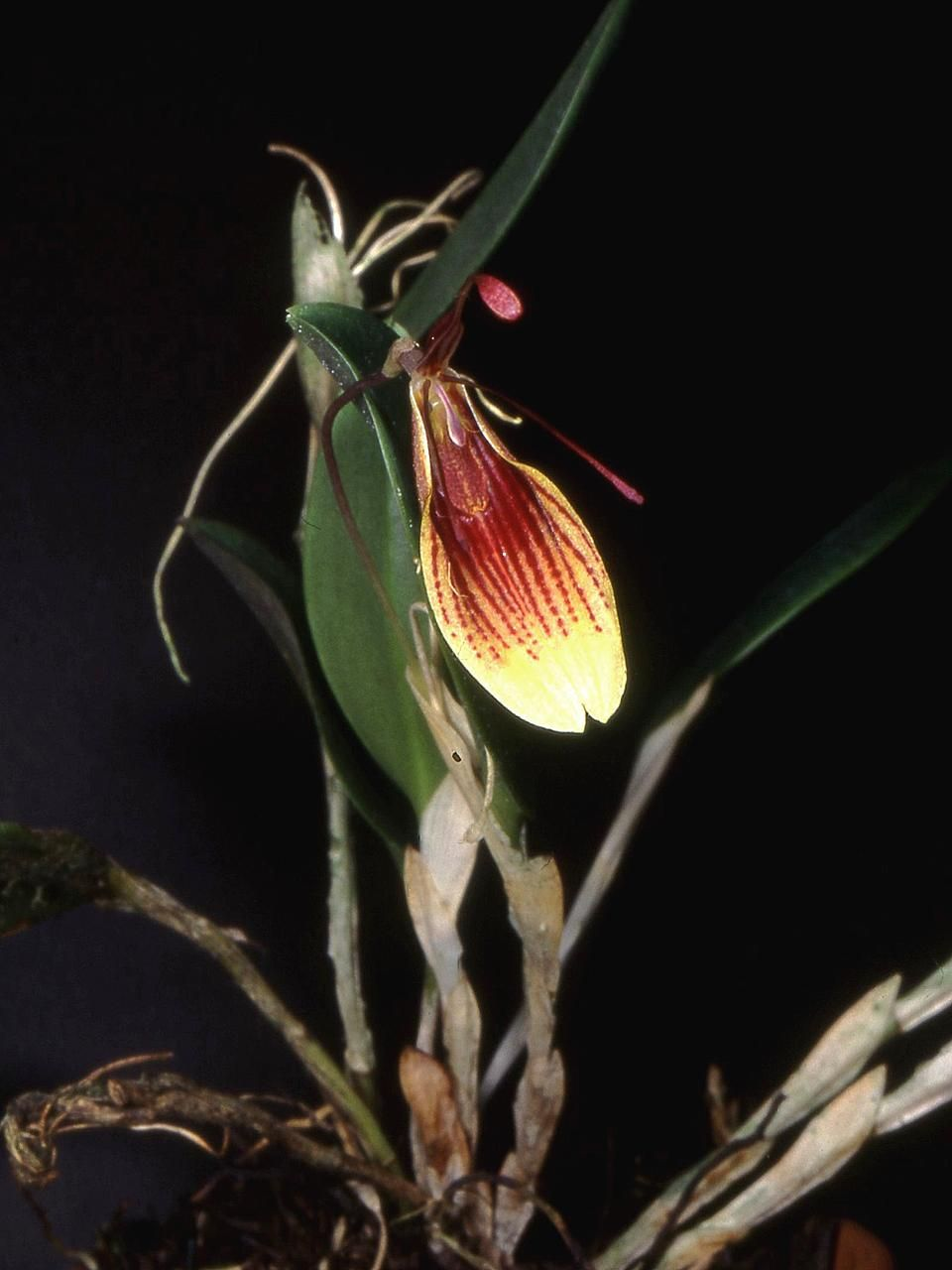
- Flower of Restrepia iris

Scientific classification
- Kingdom: Plantae
- Clade: Tracheophytes
- Clade: Angiosperms
- Clade: Monocots
- Order: Asparagales
- Family: Orchidaceae
- Subfamily: Epidendroideae
- Genus: Restrepia
- Species: R. iris

Binomial name
- Restrepia iris Luer

Synonyms
- Restrepia pulchella H.Mohr

= Restrepia iris =

Species of orchid

Restrepia iris, commonly called the rainbow restrepia, is a species of orchid endemic to southeastern Ecuador.
