= Restrepia driessenii =

Conservation status
- CITES Appendix II

Scientific classification
- Kingdom: Plantae
- Clade: Tracheophytes
- Clade: Angiosperms
- Clade: Monocots
- Order: Asparagales
- Family: Orchidaceae
- Subfamily: Epidendroideae
- Genus: Restrepia
- Species: R. driessenii

Binomial name
- Restrepia driessenii Luer & Sijm

Species of flowering plant

Restrepia driessenii is a species of flowering plant in the family Orchidaceae. It is an epiphyte native to Venezuela.

The species was described in 2009, and is listed in Appendix II of CITES.

== Taxonomy ==
The species was described in 2009, by Carlyle A. Luer and A.P. Sijm. The holotype was purchased. It was cultivated in Venhuizen, Netherlands.

== Distribution ==
Restrepia driessenii is native to the wet tropical biome of Venezuela.

== Conservation ==
Restrepia driessenii is listed in Appendix II of CITES. There are no suspensions or quotas in place for the species.
