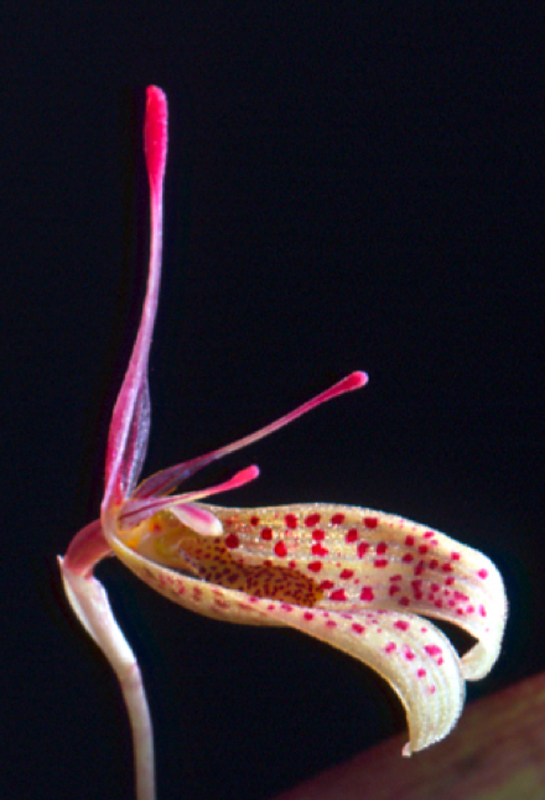
- Flower of Restrepia schizosepala

Scientific classification
- Kingdom: Plantae
- Clade: Tracheophytes
- Clade: Angiosperms
- Clade: Monocots
- Order: Asparagales
- Family: Orchidaceae
- Subfamily: Epidendroideae
- Genus: Restrepia
- Species: R. schizosepala

Binomial name
- Restrepia schizosepala Luer & Hirtz

= Restrepia schizosepala =

Species of orchid

Restrepia schizosepala is a species of orchid endemic to northeastern Ecuador. It is characterized by cespitose growth, a ramicaul of 8–11 cm in length covered by 8–9 distichous sheaths, and an ovate leaf 4–5 cm long, 2.5–3 cm wide. It produces a single flower that can be distinguished from other members of Restrepia by its synsepal, which is always deeply split.
