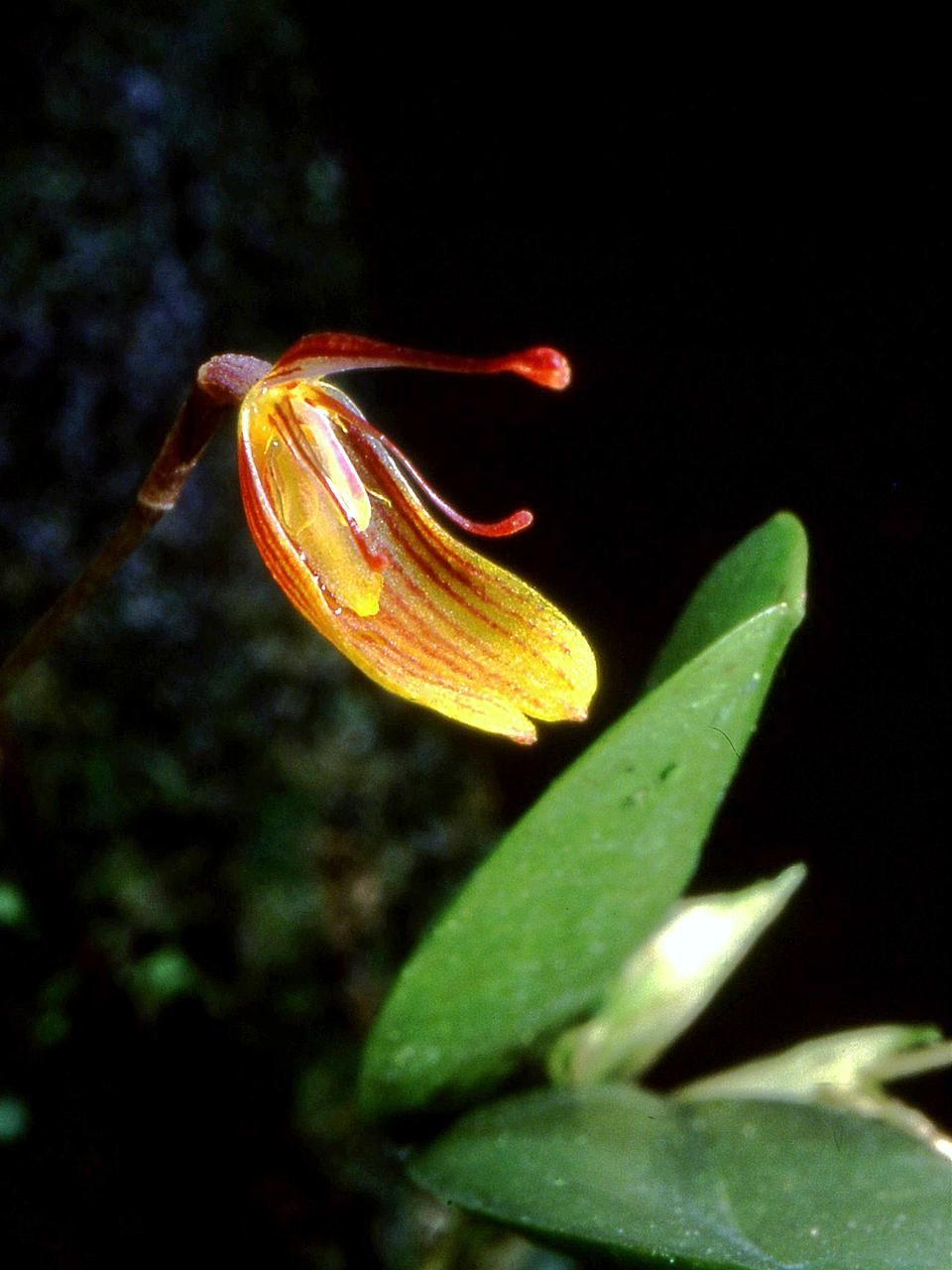
- Flower of Restrepia aspasicensium

Scientific classification
- Kingdom: Plantae
- Clade: Tracheophytes
- Clade: Angiosperms
- Clade: Monocots
- Order: Asparagales
- Family: Orchidaceae
- Subfamily: Epidendroideae
- Genus: Restrepia
- Species: R. aspasicensium

Binomial name
- Restrepia aspasicensium Rchb.f.

Synonyms
- Restrepia dentata Rolfe

= Restrepia aspasicensium =

Species of orchid

Restrepia aspasicensium is a species of orchid occurring from Colombia to northwestern Venezuela.
