= Restrepia piperitosa =

Conservation status
- CITES Appendix II

Scientific classification
- Kingdom: Plantae
- Clade: Tracheophytes
- Clade: Angiosperms
- Clade: Monocots
- Order: Asparagales
- Family: Orchidaceae
- Subfamily: Epidendroideae
- Genus: Restrepia
- Species: R. piperitosa

Binomial name
- Restrepia piperitosa Luer

Species of flowering plant

Restrepia piperitosa is a species of flowering plant in the family Orchidaceae. It is an epiphyte native to Peru.

The species was described in 1998, and is listed in Appendix II of CITES.

== Taxonomy ==
Restrepia piperitosa was described by Carlyle A. Luer in 1998.

The type material was collected in 1998. A specimen flowered in cultivation in Quito, Ecuador.

== Distribution ==
Restrepia piperitosa is native to the wet tropical biome of Peru.

== Conservation ==
Restrepia piperitosa is listed in Appendix II of CITES. There are no quotas or suspensions in place for the species.
