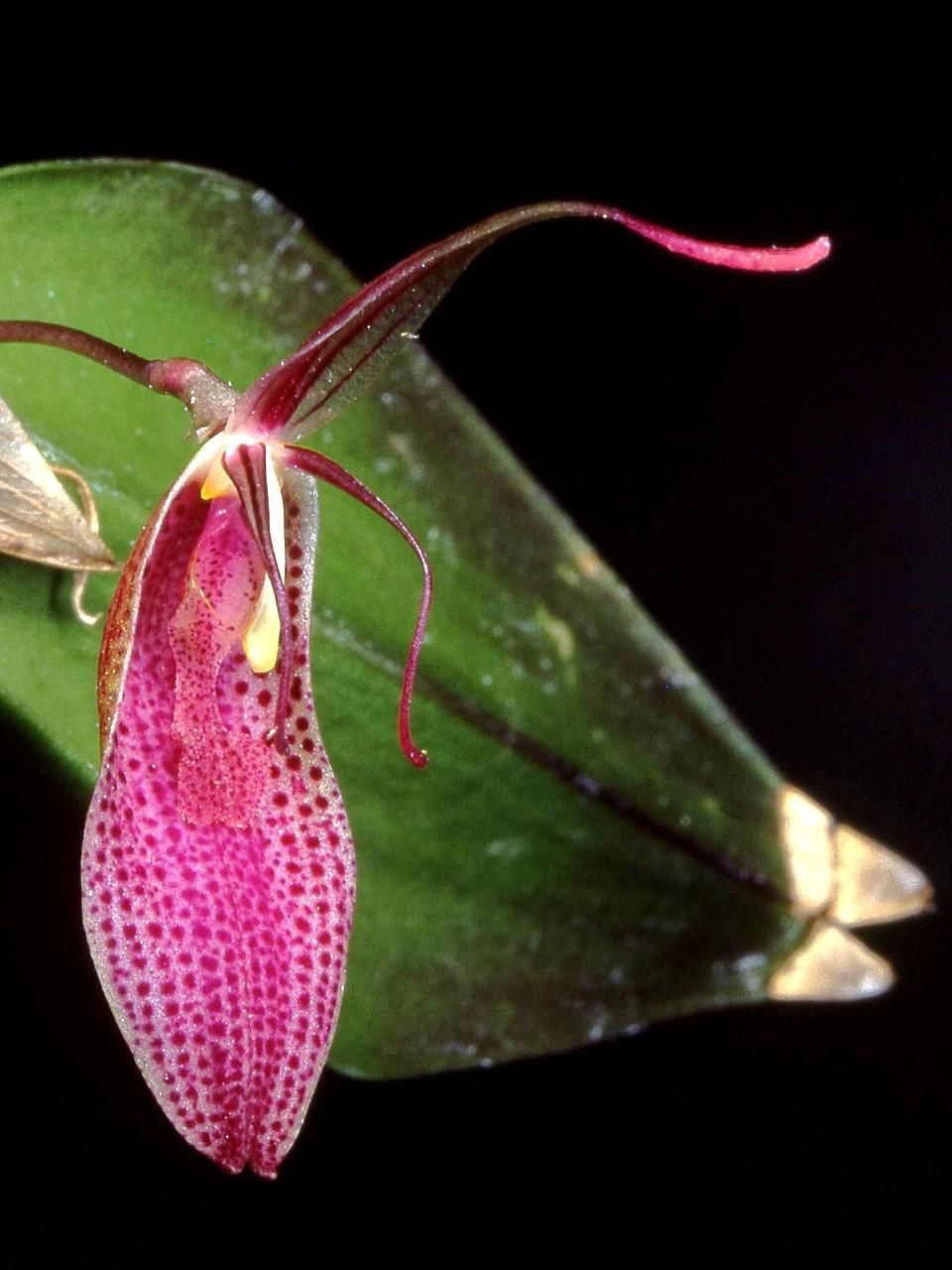
- Flower of Restrepia pandurata

Scientific classification
- Kingdom: Plantae
- Clade: Tracheophytes
- Clade: Angiosperms
- Clade: Monocots
- Order: Asparagales
- Family: Orchidaceae
- Subfamily: Epidendroideae
- Genus: Restrepia
- Species: R. pandurata

Binomial name
- Restrepia pandurata Rchb.f.

= Restrepia pandurata =

Species of orchid

Restrepia pandurata is a species of orchid endemic to Colombia.
