= Restrepia tabeae =

Conservation status
- CITES Appendix II

Scientific classification
- Kingdom: Plantae
- Clade: Tracheophytes
- Clade: Angiosperms
- Clade: Monocots
- Order: Asparagales
- Family: Orchidaceae
- Subfamily: Epidendroideae
- Genus: Restrepia
- Species: R. tabeae

Binomial name
- Restrepia tabeae H.Mohr

Species of flowering plant

Restrepia tabeae is a species of flowering plant in the family Orchidaceae. It is an epiphyte native to Colombia. The species was described in 1996, and is listed in Appendix II of CITES.

== Taxonomy ==
Restrepia tabeae was described by Hartmut Mohr in 1996.

== Distribution ==
Restrepia tabeae is native to the wet tropical biome of Colombia's Norte de Santander Department.

== Description ==
Restrepia tabeae is an epiphyte.

== Conservation ==
Restrepia tabeae is listed in Appendix II of CITES. There are no quotas or suspensions in place for the species.
