= Restrepia pelyx =

Conservation status
- CITES Appendix II

Scientific classification
- Kingdom: Plantae
- Clade: Tracheophytes
- Clade: Angiosperms
- Clade: Monocots
- Order: Asparagales
- Family: Orchidaceae
- Subfamily: Epidendroideae
- Genus: Restrepia
- Species: R. pelyx

Binomial name
- Restrepia pelyx Luer & R.Escobar

Species of flowering plant

Restrepia pelyx is a species of flowering plant in the family Orchidaceae. It is an epiphyte.

The species is native to Colombia and Venezuela. It was named in 1982, and is listed in Appendix II of CITES.

== Distribution ==
The species is native to the wet tropical biomes of Antioquia, Colombia, and Mérida, Venezuela.

== Taxonomy ==
The species was described by Carlyle A. Luer and Rodrigo Escobar in 1982. The type material was collected in September 1974.

== Conservation ==
Restrepia pelyx is listed in Appendix II of CITES. There are no suspensions or quotas in place for the species.
