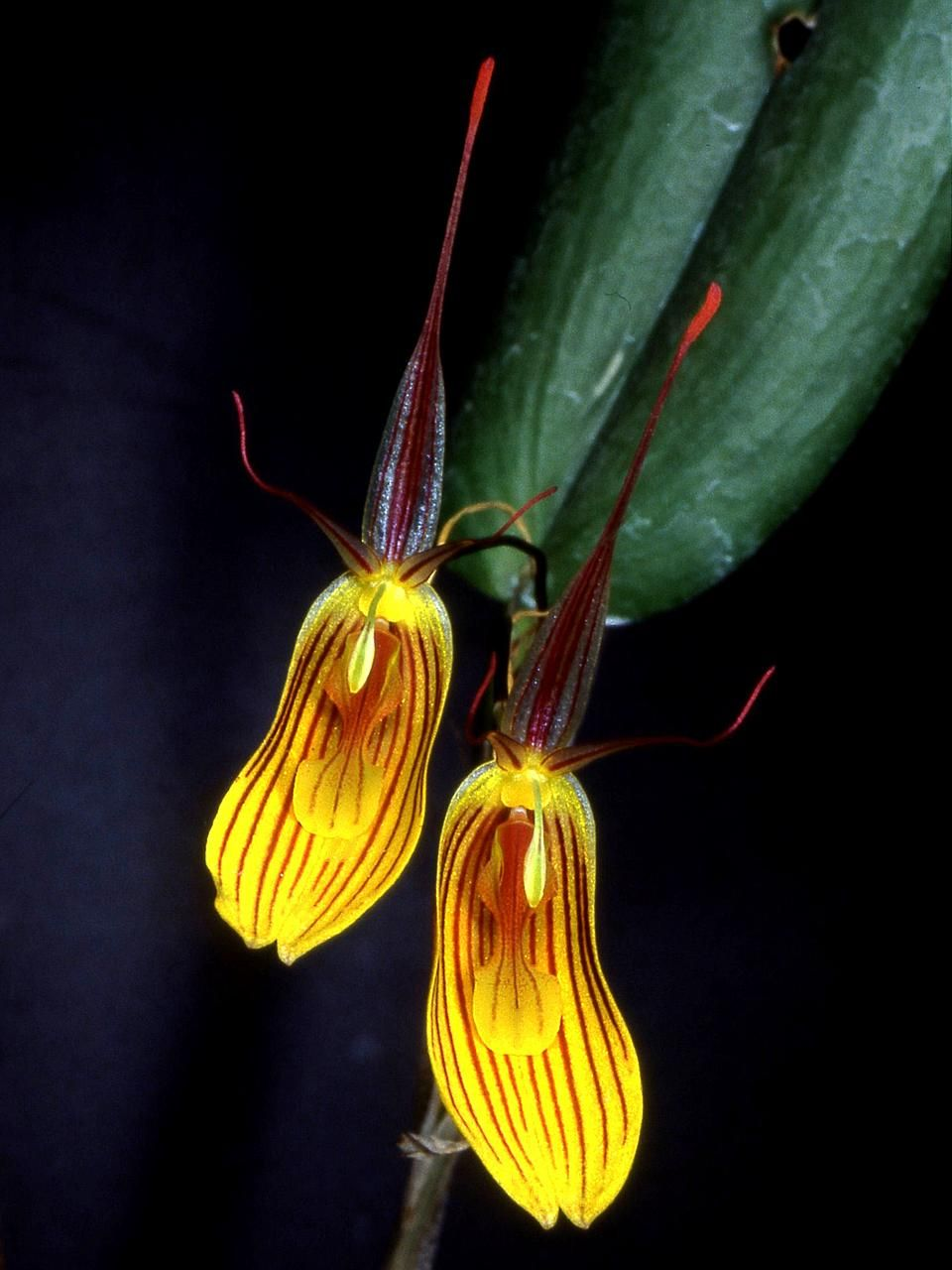

Scientific classification
- Kingdom: Plantae
- Clade: Tracheophytes
- Clade: Angiosperms
- Clade: Monocots
- Order: Asparagales
- Family: Orchidaceae
- Subfamily: Epidendroideae
- Genus: Restrepia
- Species: R. falkenbergii

Binomial name
- Restrepia falkenbergii Rchb f.

= Restrepia falkenbergii =

Species of orchid

Restrepia falkenbergii, commonly called the Falkenberg's restrepia, is an epiphytic orchid, found at altitudes between 1,000 and 2,000 m in Colombia.

This large orchid lacks pseudobulbs. The erect, thick, leathery leaf is elliptic-ovate in shape. The aerial roots seem like fine hairs.

The flowers develop one at a time at the base of the leaf. They are borne on a slender peduncle, originating from the base of the back of the leaf. The long dorsal sepal is erect and ends in a somewhat thicker club-shaped tip. They have fused lateral sepals (synsepals) with a length of about 2.5 cm. These are quite colorful : overall yellow, with orange, tan and red at the back, overlaid with contrasting reddish-purple stripes. The long, lateral petals equally end in a thickened club-shaped tip.

The long and smooth lip is pandurate and widest its apex. It shows the same variations in color and markings.
