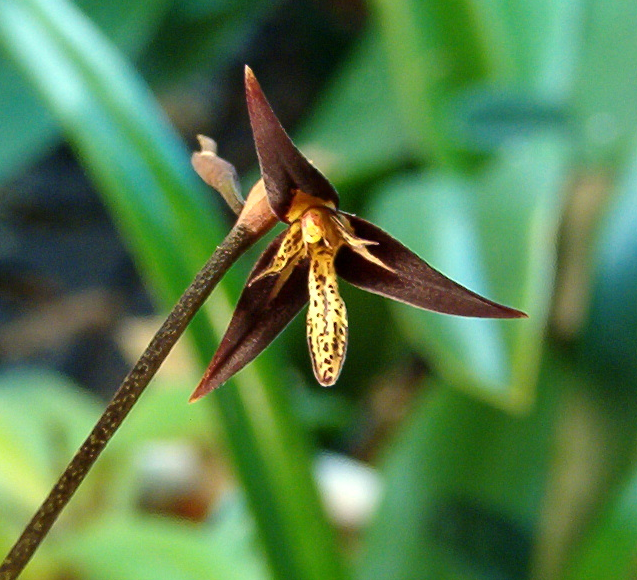
- Kraenzlinella anfracta

Scientific classification
- Kingdom: Plantae
- Clade: Tracheophytes
- Clade: Angiosperms
- Clade: Monocots
- Order: Asparagales
- Family: Orchidaceae
- Subfamily: Epidendroideae
- Tribe: Epidendreae
- Subtribe: Pleurothallidinae
- Genus: Kraenzlinella; Kuntze

Synonyms
- Otopetalum F.Lehm. & Kraenzl. 1899 not Miq. 1857 (Apocynaceae)

= Kraenzlinella =

Genus of orchids

Kraenzlinella is a genus of flowering plants from the orchid family, Orchidaceae, first described as a genus in 1903. It is native to S Mexico, Central America, and South America.

Species

1. Kraenzlinella anfracta (Luer) Luer - Tolima region in Colombia
2. Kraenzlinella echinocarpa (C.Schweinf.) Luer - Peru, Ecuador
3. Kraenzlinella erinacea (Rchb.f.) Solano - Oaxaca, Chiapas, Central America, Colombia, Venezuela, Guyana, Ecuador, Peru, Bolivia
4. Kraenzlinella gigantea (Lindl.) Luer - Peru
5. Kraenzlinella hintonii (L.O.Williams) Solano - Guerrero
6. Kraenzlinella lappago (Luer) Luer - El Oro + Napo Provinces in Ecuador
7. Kraenzlinella phrynoglossa (Luer & Hirtz) Luer - Azuay Province in Ecuador
8. Kraenzlinella rinkei Luer - Costa Rica
9. Kraenzlinella sigmoidea (Ames & C.Schweinf.) Luer - Costa Rica
10. Kraenzlinella tunguraguae (F.Lehm. & Kraenzl.) Kuntze ex Engl. & Prantl - Colombia, Ecuador, Peru

formerly included and moved to other genera
Anathallis Echinosepala Specklinia

1. Kraenzlinella platyrachis (Rolfe) Rolfe = Specklinia pfavii (Rchb.f.) Pupulin & Karremans
2. Kraenzlinella shuarii (Luer) Luer = Echinosepala shuarii (Luer) Luer
3. Kraenzlinella smaragdina (Luer) Luer = Anathallis smaragdina (Luer) Pridgeon & M.W.Chase

== See also ==
- List of Orchidaceae genera
