= Lankesteriana =

Scientific classification
- Kingdom: Plantae
- Clade: Tracheophytes
- Clade: Angiosperms
- Clade: Monocots
- Order: Asparagales
- Family: Orchidaceae
- Subfamily: Epidendroideae
- Tribe: Epidendreae
- Subtribe: Pleurothallidinae
- Genus: Lankesteriana; Karremans

Species
- 22; see text

Genus of orchids

Lankesteriana is a genus of flowering plants in the family Orchidaceae. It includes 22 species of orchids native to the tropical Americas, ranging from southern Mexico to Bolivia and southern Brazil.

The genus was described in 2014 by Adam P. Karremans to include Anathallis barbulata its close relatives. The genus is more closely related to some species of Trichosalpinx and Zootrophion than to Anathallis.

The genus name honors both the Lankester Botanical Garden of the University of Costa Rica, which celebrated its 40th anniversary the year the genus was named, and the scientific journal Lankesteriana, International Journal on Orchidology.

== Species ==
22 species are accepted.

- Lankesteriana abbreviata (Schltr.) Karremans
- Lankesteriana aurantiaca Sambin & Aucourd
- Lankesteriana barbulata (Lindl.) Karremans
- Lankesteriana casualis (Ames) Karremans
- Lankesteriana caudatipetala (C.Schweinf.) Karremans
- Lankesteriana comayaguensis (Ames) Karremans
- Lankesteriana cuspidata (Luer) Karremans
- Lankesteriana duplooyi (Luer & Sayers) Karremans
- Lankesteriana escalerensis (Carnevali & Luer) Karremans
- Lankesteriana fractiflexa (Ames & C.Schweinf.) Karremans
- Lankesteriana greenwoodii (Soto Arenas & Salazar) Solano
- Lankesteriana haberi (Luer) Karremans
- Lankesteriana heloisae (F.J.de Jesus, M.R.Miranda & Chiron) Karremans
- Lankesteriana inversa (Luer & R.Vásquez) Karremans
- Lankesteriana involuta (L.O.Williams) Karremans
- Lankesteriana millipeda (Luer) Karremans
- Lankesteriana minima (C.Schweinf.) Karremans
- Lankesteriana minutissima (Luer) Karremans
- Lankesteriana muricaudata (Luer) Karremans
- Lankesteriana rudolfii (Pabst) Karremans
- Lankesteriana steinbuchiae (Carnevali & G.A.Romero) Karremans
- Lankesteriana subapetiola Sambin & Aucourd
