= Frondaria =

Scientific classification
- Kingdom: Plantae
- Clade: Tracheophytes
- Clade: Angiosperms
- Clade: Monocots
- Order: Asparagales
- Family: Orchidaceae
- Subfamily: Epidendroideae
- Tribe: Epidendreae
- Subtribe: Pleurothallidinae
- Genus: Frondaria; Luer
- Species: F. caulescens

Binomial name
- Frondaria caulescens (Lindl.) Luer

Synonyms
- Pleurothallis caulescens Lindl.; Humboltia caulescens (Lindl.) Kuntze; Pleurothallis graminea Schltr.

Genus of orchids

Frondaria is a genus of orchid native to western South America. The species Frondaria caulescens is found at high altitudes from central Colombia, Ecuador, Peru and Bolivia. It is unique because of its leaflike sheaths of the ramicauls.

The genus includes three accepted species:

- Frondaria caulescens (Lindl.) Luer
- Frondaria colombiana Szlach., Kolan. & Rykacz.
- Frondaria graminea (Schltr.) Szlach., Kolan. & Rykacz.
