= Platystele finleyae =

Scientific classification
- Kingdom: Plantae
- Clade: Tracheophytes
- Clade: Angiosperms
- Clade: Monocots
- Order: Asparagales
- Family: Orchidaceae
- Subfamily: Epidendroideae
- Genus: Platystele
- Species: P. finleyae

Binomial name
- Platystele finleyae Monteros, E.Restrepo & Baquero

Species of flowering plant

Platystele finleyae is a species of orchid in the subtribe Pleurothallidinae. It is endemic to the cloud forests of northwestern Ecuador and was discovered within the Dracula Reserve, a privately protected area known for its exceptional orchid diversity, in the Carchi Province.

== Description ==
P. finleyae is a miniature epiphytic orchid characterized by minute, translucent flowers and a finely detailed lip structure. It is notable for its intricate floral morphology, a hallmark of the genus Platystele.

== Distribution and habitat ==
The species occurs in the montane cloud forests of the Dracula Reserve in Carchi Province, Ecuador. The reserve lies within the Chocó biogeographic region, an area rich in endemic plant species. P. finleyae grows in humid, mossy microhabitats at mid-elevations.

== Taxonomy and discovery ==
P. finleyae was formally described in 2020 by botanist Marco F. Monteros in the journal Lankesteriana. The specific epithet finleyae honors Elizabeth Finley Broaddus, an American conservationist, who established the Finley's Green Leap Forward Fund, before her death in 2014.

== Conservation ==
Although it has not yet been evaluated by the IUCN Red List, P. finleyae may be considered vulnerable due to its limited distribution and dependence on intact cloud forest ecosystems. Its presence in the protected Dracula Reserve provides some measure of conservation.
