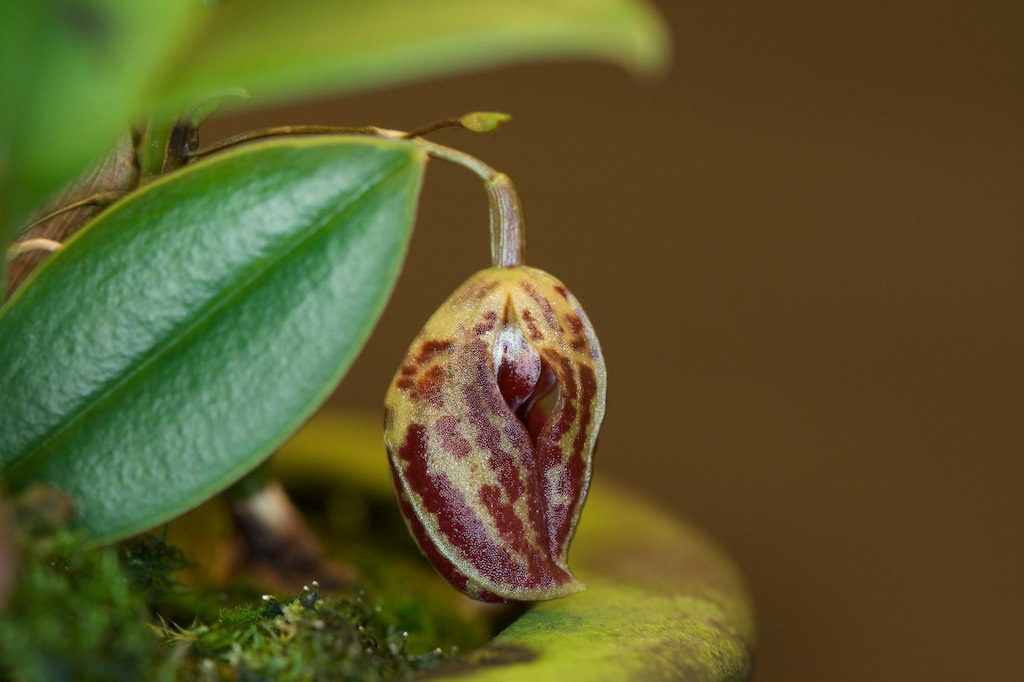
- Ophidion pleurothallopsis

Scientific classification
- Kingdom: Plantae
- Clade: Tracheophytes
- Clade: Angiosperms
- Clade: Monocots
- Order: Asparagales
- Family: Orchidaceae
- Subfamily: Epidendroideae
- Subtribe: Pleurothallidinae
- Genus: Ophidion; Luer

Species
- See text.

Synonyms

= Ophidion (plant) =

Genus of plants

Ophidion is a genus of flowering plant in the family Orchidaceae, native to Panama to western South America and Venezuela. The genus was established by Carlyle A. Luer. It has been included in a broad circumscription of Phloeophila, but there is evidence that it forms a monophyletic taxon, and it is accepted by Plants of the World Online.

== Species ==
As of September 2026, Plants of the World Online accepted the following species:

- Ophidion alphonsianum (L.E.Matthews) Karremans & J.S.Moreno
- Ophidion barbilabium (Vierling) Karremans & J.S.Moreno
- Ophidion carrilloi P.Ortiz
- Ophidion compactum (Vierling) Karremans & J.S.Moreno
- Ophidion cunabulum (Luer & R.Escobar) Luer
- Ophidion cymbula (Luer) Luer
- Ophidion dasyglossum (Luer & R.Escobar) Luer
- Ophidion doucetteanum (L.E.Matthews) Karremans & J.S.Moreno
- Ophidion erectilabrum Reina-Rodr., O.Pérez & Bogarín
- Ophidion juan-felipei (Vierling) Karremans & J.S.Moreno
- Ophidion markertii (Vierling) Karremans & J.S.Moreno
- Ophidion nekidapono J.S.Moreno & Karremans
- Ophidion nigerrimum (Vierling) Karremans & J.S.Moreno
- Ophidion orchidoides A.Doucette
- Ophidion pallidiflorum (Vierling) Karremans & J.S.Moreno
- Ophidion parvum (Vierling) Karremans & J.S.Moreno
- Ophidion pleurothallopsis (Kraenzl.) Luer
