= Pupulinia =

Conservation status
- CITES Appendix II

Scientific classification
- Kingdom: Plantae
- Clade: Tracheophytes
- Clade: Angiosperms
- Clade: Monocots
- Order: Asparagales
- Family: Orchidaceae
- Subfamily: Epidendroideae
- Tribe: Epidendreae
- Subtribe: Pleurothallidinae
- Genus: Pupulinia; Karremans & Bogarín
- Species: P. shuarii

Binomial name
- Pupulinia shuarii (Luer) Karremans & Bogarín

Synonyms
- Pleurothallis shuarii Luer; Kraenzlinella shuarii (Luer) Luer; Echinosepala shuarii (Luer) Luer

Genus of orchids

Pupulinia is a genus of orchid. It includes a single species, Pupulinia shuarii, an epiphyte endemic to southeastern Ecuador.
