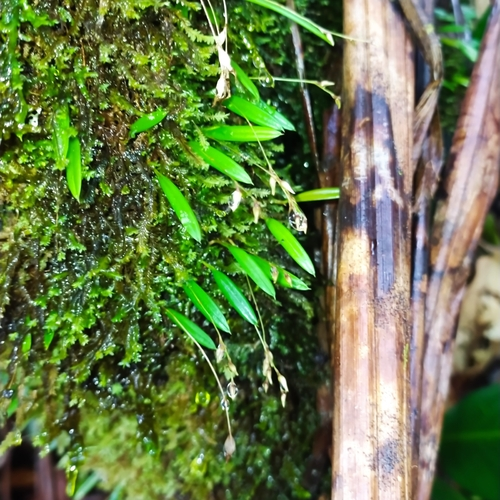

Scientific classification
- Kingdom: Plantae
- Clade: Embryophytes
- Clade: Tracheophytes
- Clade: Spermatophytes
- Clade: Angiosperms
- Clade: Monocots
- Order: Asparagales
- Family: Orchidaceae
- Subfamily: Epidendroideae
- Subtribe: Pleurothallidinae
- Genus: Madisonia; Luer

Species
- See text.

Synonyms
- Sansonia Chiron

= Madisonia =

Genus of plants

Madisonia, synonym Sansonia, is a genus of flowering plants in the family Orchidaceae, native to Jamaica, Trinidad and Tobago, and tropical South America. The genus was established by Carlyle A. Luer in 2004.

== Species ==
As of January 2023, Plants of the World Online accepted the following species:

- Madisonia articulata (Lindl.) Toscano & E.C.Smidt
- Madisonia bradei (Schltr.) Toscano & E.C.Smidt
- Madisonia brasilica (Luer & Toscano) Toscano & E.C.Smidt
- Madisonia carrisii (Brade) Toscano & E.C.Smidt
- Madisonia gomesii-ferreirae (Pabst) Toscano & E.C.Smidt
- Madisonia ianthina (E.M.Pessoa & F.Barros) Toscano & E.C.Smidt
- Madisonia kerrii (Braga) Luer
- Madisonia spiculifera (Lindl.) Toscano & E.C.Smidt
- Madisonia vandenbergii (Chiron) Toscano & E.C.Smidt
