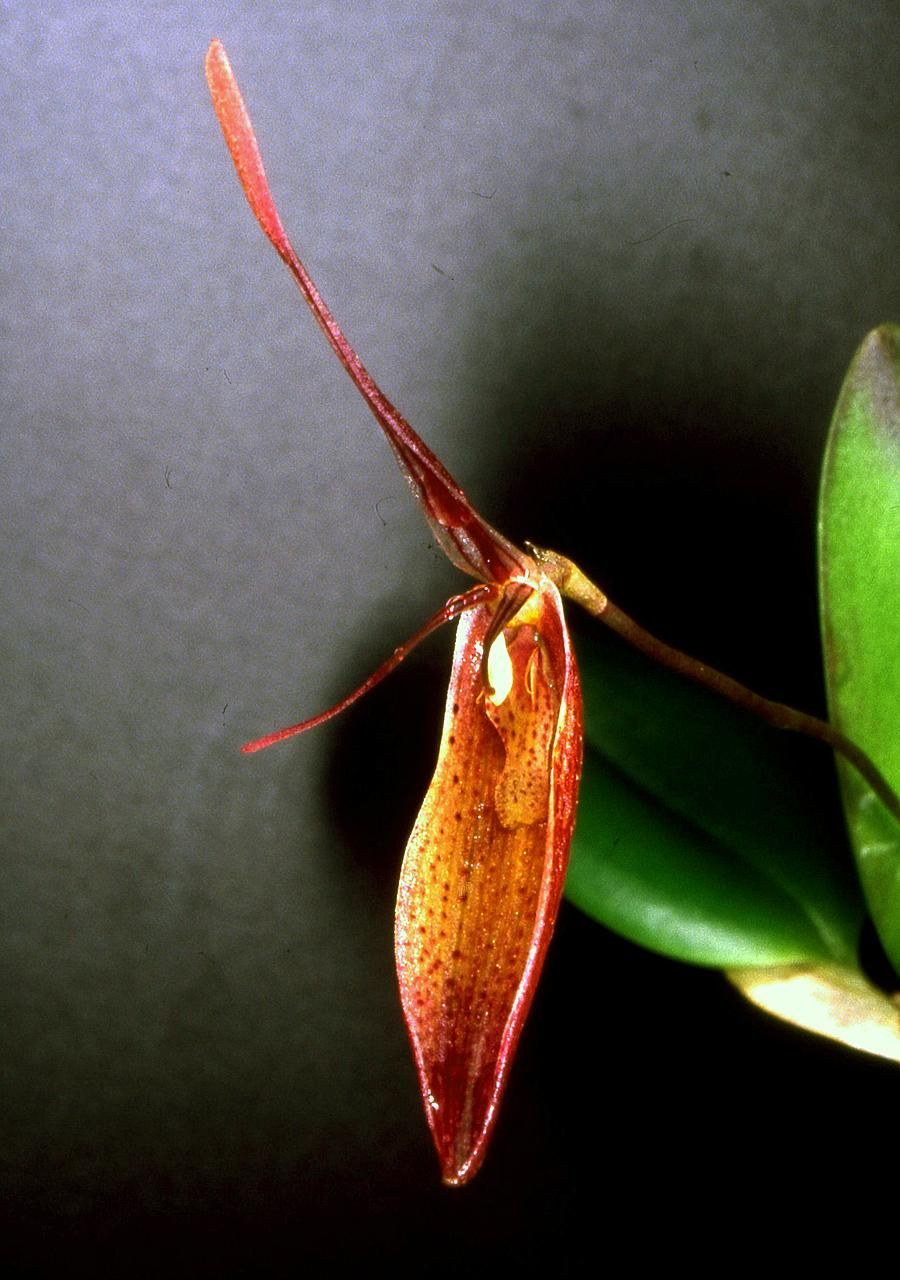
- Flower of Restrepia teaguei

Scientific classification
- Kingdom: Plantae
- Clade: Tracheophytes
- Clade: Angiosperms
- Clade: Monocots
- Order: Asparagales
- Family: Orchidaceae
- Subfamily: Epidendroideae
- Genus: Restrepia
- Species: R. teaguei

Binomial name
- Restrepia teaguei Luer

= Restrepia teaguei =

Species of orchid

Restrepia teaguei, commonly called the Teague's restrepia, is a species of orchid endemic to Ecuador (Zamora-Chinchipe).
