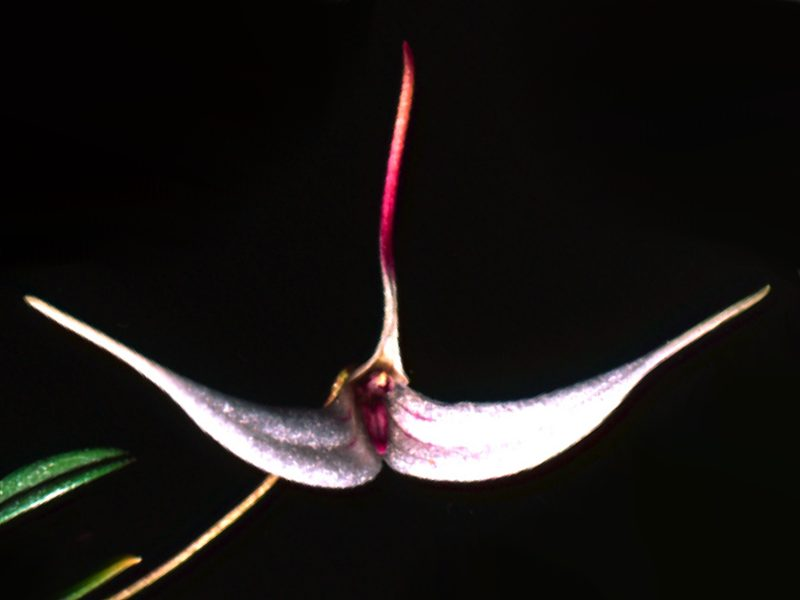
- Trisetella hoeijeri

Scientific classification
- Kingdom: Plantae
- Clade: Tracheophytes
- Clade: Angiosperms
- Clade: Monocots
- Order: Asparagales
- Family: Orchidaceae
- Subfamily: Epidendroideae
- Subtribe: Pleurothallidinae
- Genus: Trisetella; Luer

Type species
- Trisetella triaristella

Synonyms
- Triaristella (Rchb.) Brieger ex Luer; Triaristella Brieger, nom. inval.; Triaristellina Rauschert

= Trisetella =

Genus of orchids

Trisetella is a genus of orchids, native to Central and South America. Twelve of the 23 currently known species are endemic to Ecuador. They bear small flowers with fused sepals and fused petals. The synsepal bears three hair-like tails, which is the namesake of Trisetella ("three little bristles").

Species accepted as of June 2014:

1. Trisetella abbreviata Luer - Ecuador
2. Trisetella andreettae Luer - Ecuador
3. Trisetella cordeliae Luer - Peru
4. Trisetella dalstroemii Luer - Ecuador
5. Trisetella didyma (Luer) Luer - Ecuador
6. Trisetella dressleri (Luer) Luer - Panama
7. Trisetella escobarii Luer - Colombia
8. Trisetella fissidens Luer & Hirtz - Ecuador
9. Trisetella gemmata (Rchb.f.) Luer - Colombia
10. Trisetella hirtzii Luer - Ecuador
11. Trisetella hoeijeri Luer & Hirtz - Ecuador
12. Trisetella klingeri Luer - Ecuador
13. Trisetella lasiochila Pupulin - Costa Rica
14. Trisetella nodulifera Luer & Hirtz - Ecuador, Peru
15. Trisetella pantex (Luer) Luer - Ecuador
16. Trisetella regia Königer - Peru
17. Trisetella scobina Luer - Ecuador, Bolivia
18. Trisetella sororia Luer & Andreetta - Ecuador
19. Trisetella strumosa Luer & Andreetta - Ecuador
20. Trisetella tenuissima (C.Schweinf.) Luer - Colombia, Panama
21. Trisetella triaristella (Rchb.f.) Luer - Costa Rica, Panama, Colombia, Ecuador, Bolivia
22. Trisetella triglochin (Rchb.f.) Luer - Costa Rica, Panama, Colombia, Ecuador, Bolivia, Brazil, Venezuela, the Guianas
23. Trisetella vittata (Luer) Luer - Ecuador
