= Teagueia =

Scientific classification
- Kingdom: Plantae
- Clade: Tracheophytes
- Clade: Angiosperms
- Clade: Monocots
- Order: Asparagales
- Family: Orchidaceae
- Subfamily: Epidendroideae
- Tribe: Epidendreae
- Subtribe: Pleurothallidinae
- Genus: Teagueia (Luer) Luer

Genus of orchids

Teagueia is a genus of orchids. They are found at high altitudes in the Andes in Colombia, Peru and Ecuador.

As of December 2025, Plants of the World Online accepts the following 18 species:

- Teagueia alyssana Luer & L.Jost
- Teagueia anitana L.Jost & Shepard
- Teagueia barbeliana L.Jost & Shepard
- Teagueia beverlysacklerae L.Jost & Shepard
- Teagueia cymbisepala Luer & L.Jost
- Teagueia jostii Luer
- Teagueia kostoglouana L.Jost & Shepard
- Teagueia lehmannii Luer
- Teagueia lizziefinchiana L.Jost & Shepard
- Teagueia moisesii Chocce & M.E.Acuña
- Teagueia phasmida (Luer & R.Escobar) O.Gruss & M.Wolff
- Teagueia portillae Luer
- Teagueia puroana L.Jost & Shepard
- Teagueia rex (Luer & R.Escobar) O.Gruss & M.Wolff
- Teagueia sancheziae Luer & L.Jost
- Teagueia teaguei (Luer) Luer
- Teagueia tentaculata Luer & Hirtz
- Teagueia zeus (Luer & Hirtz) O.Gruss & M.Wolff
