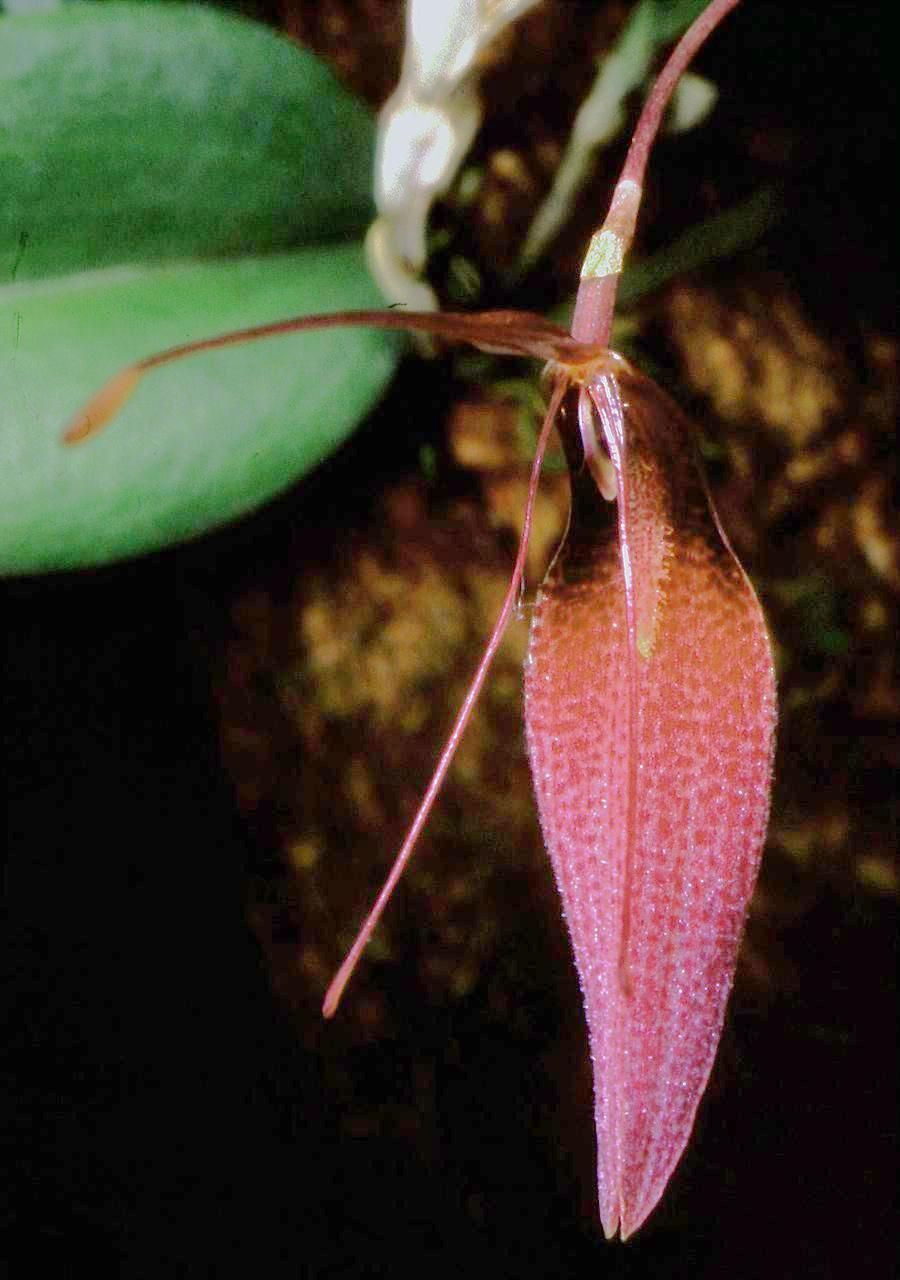
- Flower of Restrepia dodsonii

Scientific classification
- Kingdom: Plantae
- Clade: Tracheophytes
- Clade: Angiosperms
- Clade: Monocots
- Order: Asparagales
- Family: Orchidaceae
- Subfamily: Epidendroideae
- Genus: Restrepia
- Species: R. dodsonii

Binomial name
- Restrepia dodsonii Luer

= Restrepia dodsonii =

Species of orchid

Restrepia dodsonii, commonly called the Dodson's restrepia, is a species of orchid endemic to Ecuador (Pichincha).
