= Teagueia teaguei =

Scientific classification
- Kingdom: Plantae
- Clade: Tracheophytes
- Clade: Angiosperms
- Clade: Monocots
- Order: Asparagales
- Family: Orchidaceae
- Subfamily: Epidendroideae
- Genus: Teagueia
- Species: T. teaguei

Binomial name
- Teagueia teaguei (Luer) Luer

Synonyms
- Platystele teaguei Luer

Species of orchid

Teagueia teaguei is a species of orchid endemic to Ecuador.
