= Ophidion =

Ophidion may refer to:

- Ophidion (plant), a genus of orchids
- Ophidion (fish), a genus of cusk-eels
