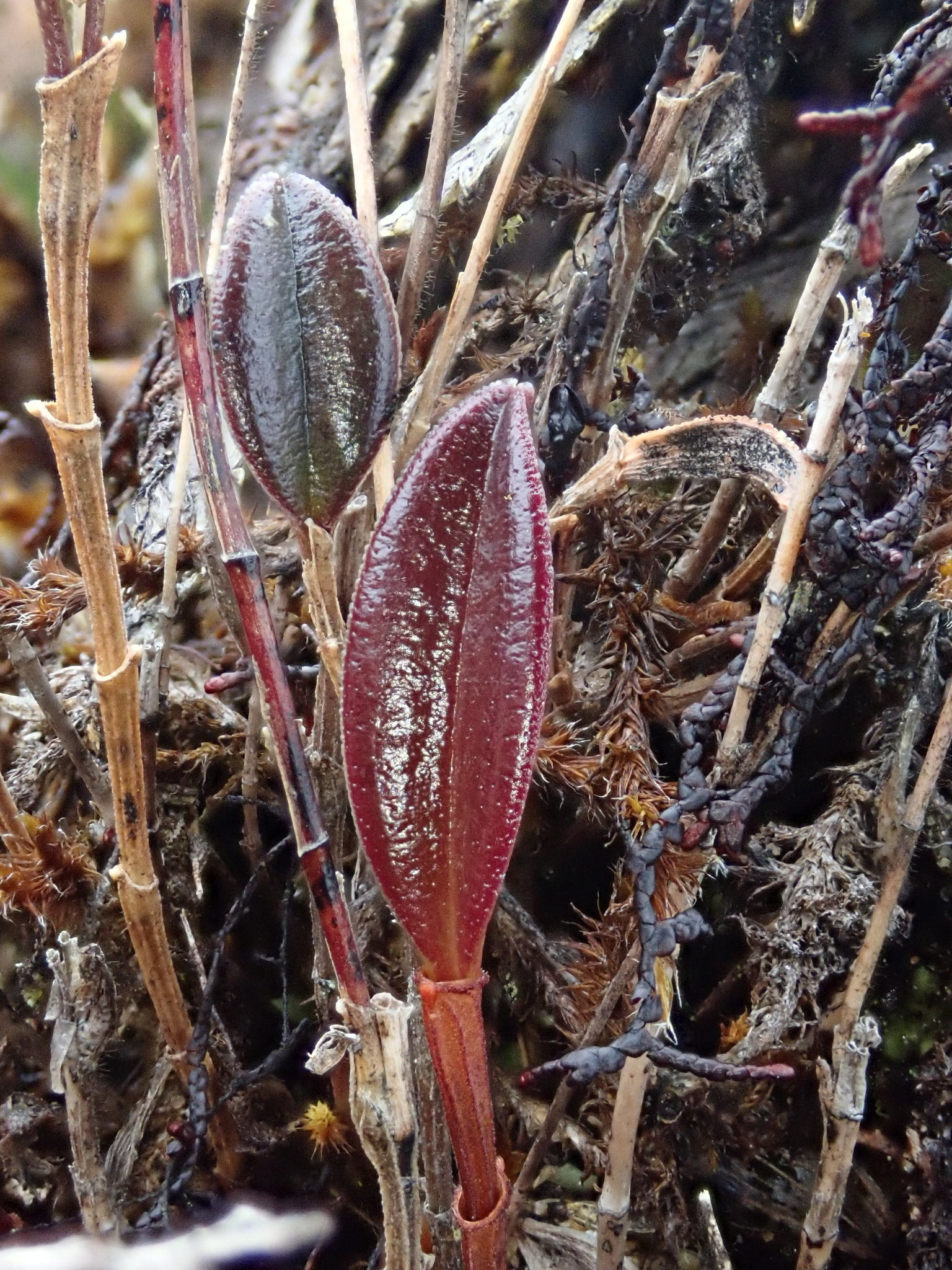
- Draconanthes aberrans

Scientific classification
- Kingdom: Plantae
- Clade: Embryophytes
- Clade: Tracheophytes
- Clade: Angiosperms
- Clade: Monocots
- Order: Asparagales
- Family: Orchidaceae
- Subfamily: Epidendroideae
- Tribe: Epidendreae
- Subtribe: Pleurothallidinae
- Genus: Draconanthes; Luer

Species
- Draconanthes aberrans; Draconanthes bicentenaria; Draconanthes bufonis; Draconanthes chingazaense; Draconanthes ecuadoriana; Draconanthes kamentsa; Draconanthes lueriana; Draconanthes prionota; Draconanthes trachysepala; Draconanthes venezuelana

= Draconanthes =

Genus of orchids

Draconanthes is a genus of orchids, comprising ten species found in northwestern South America. It was established as a subgenus within the genus Lepanthes in 1986, but is now considered an accepted genus, related to Lepanthes. It is a member of the Pleurothallidinae subtribe.
