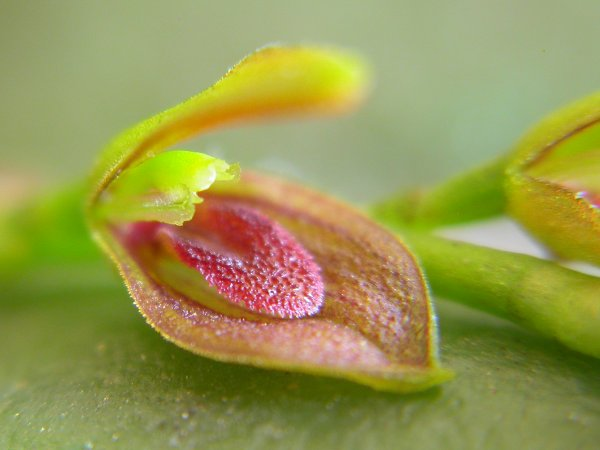

Scientific classification
- Kingdom: Plantae
- Clade: Tracheophytes
- Clade: Angiosperms
- Clade: Monocots
- Order: Asparagales
- Family: Orchidaceae
- Subfamily: Epidendroideae
- Genus: Acianthera
- Species: A. marumbyana

Binomial name
- Acianthera marumbyana (Garay) Luer

Synonyms
- Pleurothallis marumbyana Garay

= Acianthera marumbyana =

Species of orchid

Acianthera marumbyana is a species of flowering plant in the family Orchidaceae.
