= Restrepia ephippium =

Conservation status
- CITES Appendix II

Scientific classification
- Kingdom: Plantae
- Clade: Tracheophytes
- Clade: Angiosperms
- Clade: Monocots
- Order: Asparagales
- Family: Orchidaceae
- Subfamily: Epidendroideae
- Genus: Restrepia
- Species: R. ephippium

Binomial name
- Restrepia ephippium Luer & Hirtz

Species of flowering plant

Restrepia ephippium is a species of flowering plant in the family Orchidaceae. It is an epiphyte.

Restrepia ephippium is native to Ecuador. It was described in 1996, and is listed in Appendix II of CITES.

== Distribution ==
Restrepia ephippium is native to the wet tropical biome of Ecuador's Imbabura Province.

== Taxonomy ==
The species was described by Carlyle August Luer and Alexander Charles Hirtz in 1996.

The holotype was collected from a wet forest in Ecuador, at an elevation of 1,200 metres (3,900 ft). The specimen was cultivated in Bristol, Connecticut, where it flowered.

== Conservation ==
Restrepia ephippium is listed in Appendix II of CITES. There are no quotas or suspensions in place for the species.
