= Acianthera breviflora =

Scientific classification
- Kingdom: Plantae
- Clade: Tracheophytes
- Clade: Angiosperms
- Clade: Monocots
- Order: Asparagales
- Family: Orchidaceae
- Subfamily: Epidendroideae
- Genus: Acianthera
- Species: A. breviflora

Binomial name
- Acianthera breviflora (Lindl.) Luer

Synonyms
- Pleurothallis breviflora Lindl.

Species of plant

Acianthera breviflora is a species of orchid plant native to Mexico.
