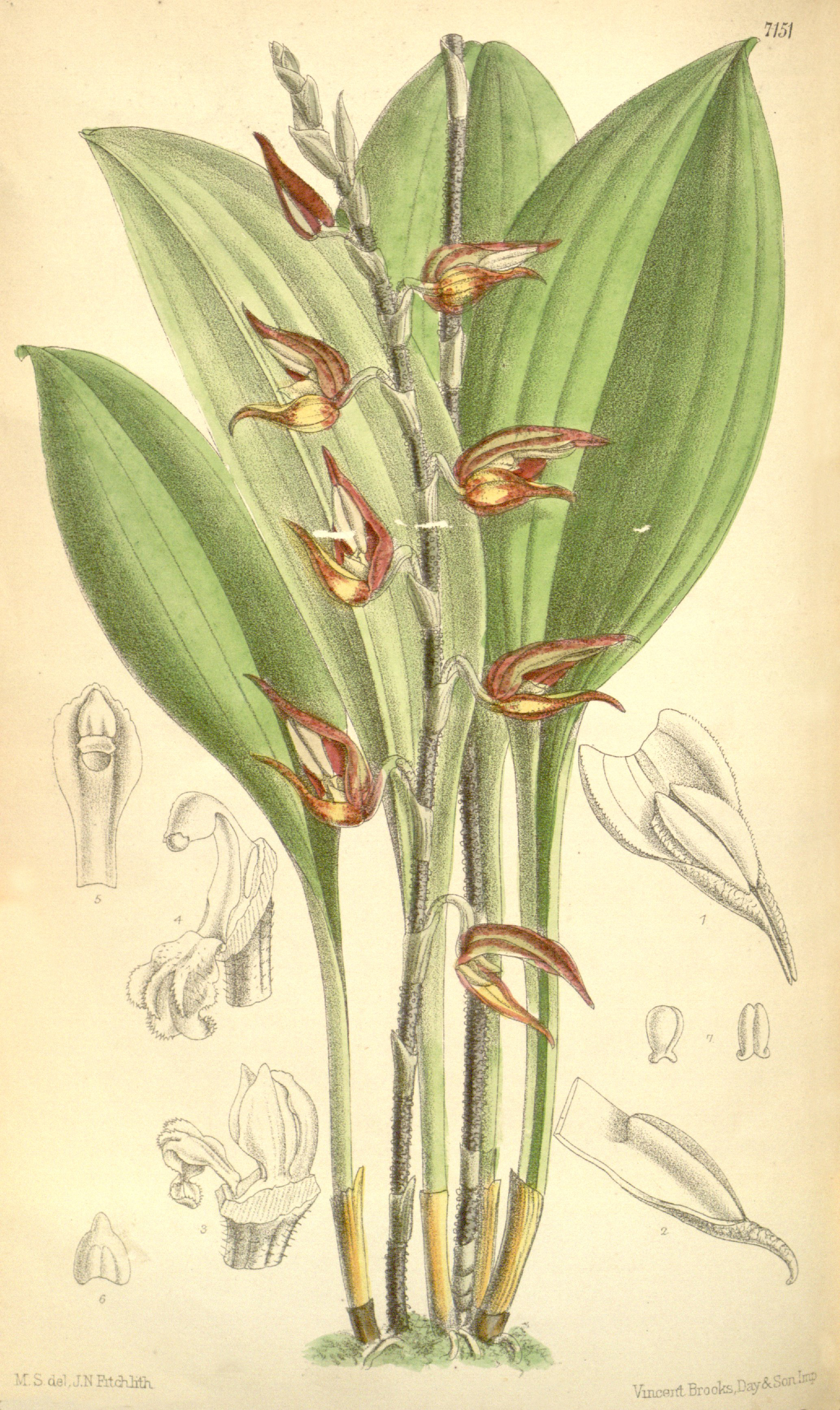
- Scaphosepalum pulvinare 1869 illustration

Scientific classification
- Kingdom: Plantae
- Clade: Tracheophytes
- Clade: Angiosperms
- Clade: Monocots
- Order: Asparagales
- Family: Orchidaceae
- Subfamily: Epidendroideae
- Genus: Scaphosepalum
- Species: S. pulvinare

Binomial name
- Scaphosepalum pulvinare (Rchb.f.) Rolfe

Synonyms
- Masdevallia pulvinaris Rchb.f. (basionym); Scaphosepalum rolfeanum Kraenzl.

= Scaphosepalum pulvinare =

Species of orchid

Scaphosepalum pulvinare is a species of orchid found in Colombia and Ecuador.
