= Stellamaris =

Scientific classification
- Kingdom: Plantae
- Clade: Tracheophytes
- Clade: Angiosperms
- Clade: Monocots
- Order: Asparagales
- Family: Orchidaceae
- Subfamily: Epidendroideae
- Tribe: Epidendreae
- Subtribe: Pleurothallidinae
- Genus: Stellamaris; Mel.Fernández & Bogarín
- Species: S. pergrata

Binomial name
- Stellamaris pergrata (Ames) Mel.Fernández & Bogarín

Synonyms
- Pleurothallis falcipetala Schltr.; Pleurothallis pergrata Ames; Trichosalpinx falcipetala (Schltr.) Luer; Trichosalpinx pergrata (Ames) Luer; Tubella pergrata (Ames) Archila

Species of plant

Stellamaris pergrata is a species of flowering plant in the family Orchidaceae, native to Costa Rica, Panama and Colombia. It was first described by Oakes Ames in 1923 as Pleurothallis pergrata. It is the only species in the monotypic genus Stellamaris. The genus is one of a number established within subtribe Pleurothallidinae in 2018 as a result of a molecular phylogenetic study.
