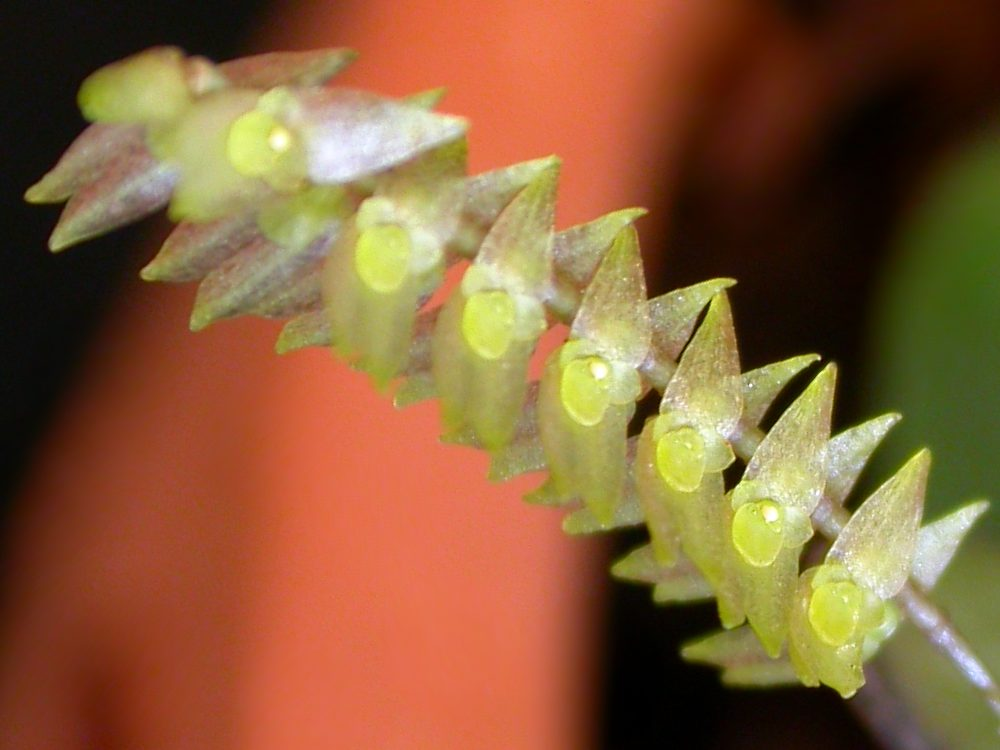
- Lepanthopsis floripecten

Scientific classification
- Kingdom: Plantae
- Clade: Tracheophytes
- Clade: Angiosperms
- Clade: Monocots
- Order: Asparagales
- Family: Orchidaceae
- Subfamily: Epidendroideae
- Tribe: Epidendreae
- Subtribe: Pleurothallidinae
- Genus: Lepanthopsis (Cogn.) Ames

Synonyms
- Expedicula Luer

= Lepanthopsis =

Genus of orchids

Lepanthopsis, abbreviated as Lpths in horticultural trade, is a genus of orchids with about 50 currently known species. They are distributed mostly in the Andes and the Caribbean, with some species in Central America, southern Mexico and Florida. Lepanthopsis orchids are very small, often with flowers measuring less than 1 centimeter across.

== Species ==
Species accepted as of September 2026:

1. Lepanthopsis abbreviata Luer & Hirtz
2. Lepanthopsis acetabulum Luer
3. Lepanthopsis acuminata Ames
4. Lepanthopsis anthoctenium (Rchb.f.) Ames
5. Lepanthopsis apoda (Garay & Dunst.) Luer
6. Lepanthopsis aristata Dod
7. Lepanthopsis astrophora (Rchb.f. ex Kraenzl.) Garay
8. Lepanthopsis atrosetifera Dod
9. Lepanthopsis barahonensis (Cogn.) Garay
10. Lepanthopsis bennettii Rykacz., Baranow & Kolan.
11. Lepanthopsis calva Dod ex Luer
12. Lepanthopsis comet-halleyi Luer
13. Lepanthopsis constanzensis (Cogn.) Garay
14. Lepanthopsis cucullata Dod
15. Lepanthopsis culiculosa Luer
16. Lepanthopsis densiflora (Barb.Rodr.) Ames
17. Lepanthopsis dewildei Luer & R.Escobar
18. Lepanthopsis dodii Garay
19. Lepanthopsis doucetteana Pfahl
20. Lepanthopsis farrago (Luer & Hirtz) Luer
21. Lepanthopsis floripecten (Rchb.f.) Ames
22. Lepanthopsis glandulifera Dod
23. Lepanthopsis hirtzii Luer
24. Lepanthopsis hotteana (Mansf.) Garay
25. Lepanthopsis hyalina (H.Stenzel) Karremans
26. Lepanthopsis legadensis Zandoná & Cath. ex A.Doucette & Pfahl
27. Lepanthopsis lingulata Dod
28. Lepanthopsis maculanthina L.E.Matthews
29. Lepanthopsis melanantha (Rchb.f.) Ames
30. Lepanthopsis micheliae Dod
31. Lepanthopsis microlepanthes (Griseb.) Ames
32. Lepanthopsis moniliformis Dod
33. Lepanthopsis obliquipetala (Ames & C.Schweinf.) Luer
34. Lepanthopsis ornipteridion Dod
35. Lepanthopsis peniculus (Schltr.) Garay
36. Lepanthopsis pristis Luer & R.Escobar
37. Lepanthopsis prolifera Garay
38. Lepanthopsis pulchella Garay & Dunst.
39. Lepanthopsis purpurata Dod ex Luer
40. Lepanthopsis pygmaea C.Schweinf.
41. Lepanthopsis rinkei Luer
42. Lepanthopsis serrulata (Cogn.) Hespenh. & Garay
43. Lepanthopsis stellaris Dod
44. Lepanthopsis steyermarkii Foldats
45. Lepanthopsis trulliformis I.Jiménez
46. Lepanthopsis ubangii Luer
47. Lepanthopsis undulata Kolan. & Szlach.
48. Lepanthopsis vellozicola R.C.Mota, F.Barros & Stehmann
49. Lepanthopsis vinacea C.Schweinf.
50. Lepanthopsis woodsiana Dod ex Luer
