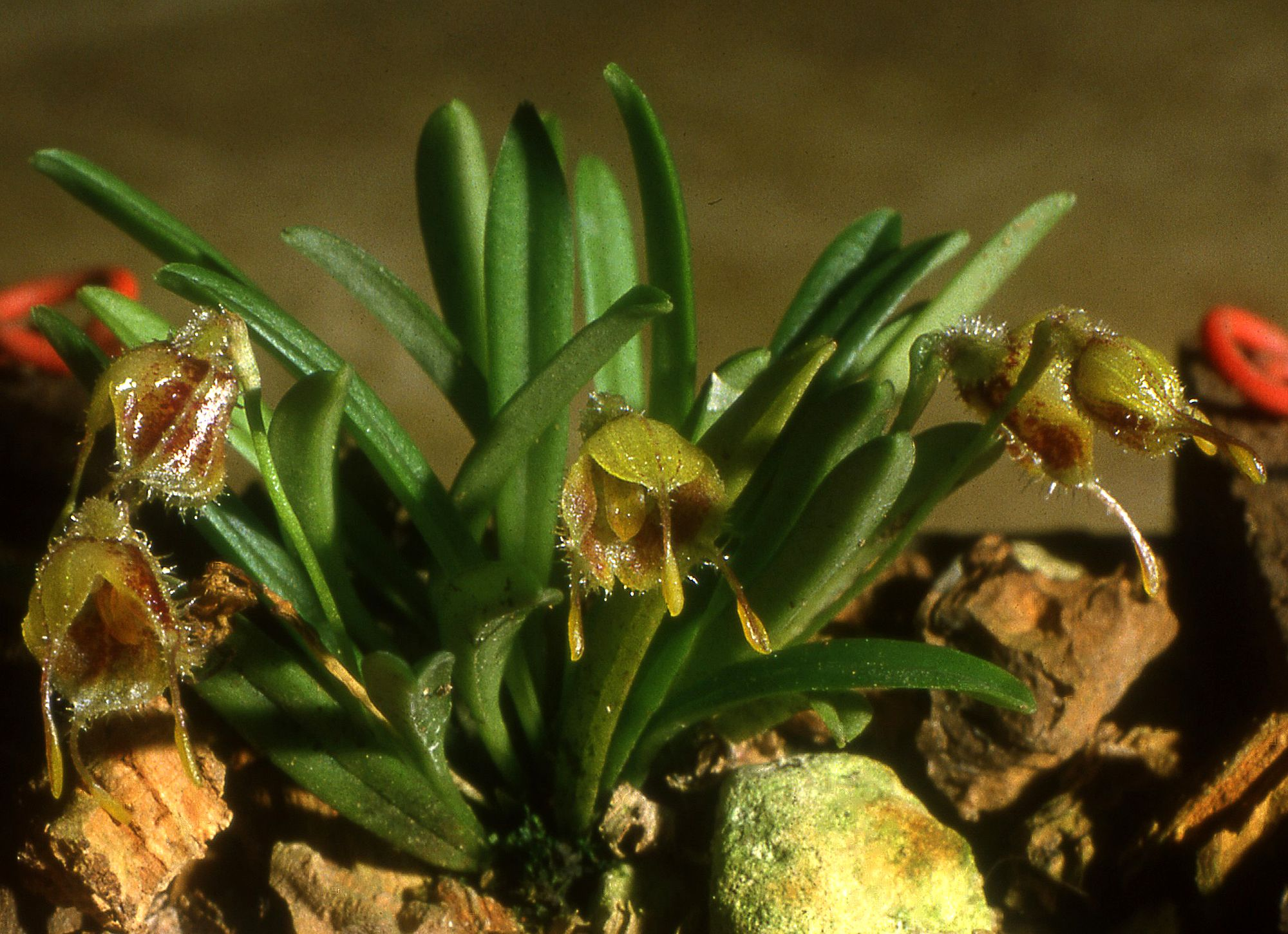

Scientific classification
- Kingdom: Plantae
- Clade: Tracheophytes
- Clade: Angiosperms
- Clade: Monocots
- Order: Asparagales
- Family: Orchidaceae
- Subfamily: Epidendroideae
- Subtribe: Pleurothallidinae
- Genus: Diodonopsis; Pridgeon & M.W.Chase

= Diodonopsis =

Genus of plants

Diodonopsis is a genus of flowering plants belonging to the family Orchidaceae.

Its native range is Costa Rica to Western South America.

== Species ==
Species:

- Diodonopsis anachaeta (Rchb.f.) Pridgeon & M.W.Chase
- Diodonopsis erinacea (Rchb.f.) Pridgeon & M.W.Chase
- Diodonopsis hoeijeri (Luer & Hirtz) Pridgeon & M.W.Chase
- Diodonopsis pterygiophora (Luer & R.Escobar) Pridgeon & M.W.Chase
- Diodonopsis pygmaea (Kraenzl.) Pridgeon & M.W.Chase
- Diodonopsis ramiromedinae Thoerle
