= Echinosepala arenicola =

Scientific classification
- Kingdom: Plantae
- Clade: Tracheophytes
- Clade: Angiosperms
- Clade: Monocots
- Order: Asparagales
- Family: Orchidaceae
- Subfamily: Epidendroideae
- Genus: Echinosepala
- Species: E. arenicola

Binomial name
- Echinosepala arenicola (Carnevali & I.Ramírez) Carnevali & G.A.Romero

Synonyms
- Pleurothallis arenicola (Carnevali & I.Ramírez) Carnevali & I.Ramírez

Species of orchid

Echinosepala arenicola is a species of orchid plant native to Venezuela.
