= Phloeophila peperomioides =

Scientific classification
- Kingdom: Plantae
- Clade: Tracheophytes
- Clade: Angiosperms
- Clade: Monocots
- Order: Asparagales
- Family: Orchidaceae
- Subfamily: Epidendroideae
- Genus: Phloeophila
- Species: P. peperomioides

Binomial name
- Phloeophila peperomioides (Ames) Garay

Synonyms
- Pleurothallis peperomioides Ames

Species of plant

Phloeophila peperomioides is a species of orchid plant native to Belize and Costa Rica.
