= Brachionidium elegans =

Scientific classification
- Kingdom: Plantae
- Clade: Tracheophytes
- Clade: Angiosperms
- Clade: Monocots
- Order: Asparagales
- Family: Orchidaceae
- Subfamily: Epidendroideae
- Genus: Brachionidium
- Species: B. elegans

Binomial name
- Brachionidium elegans Luer & Hirtz, 1986

Species of plant

Brachionidium elegans is a species of orchid. It is found in Ecuador and Peru.
