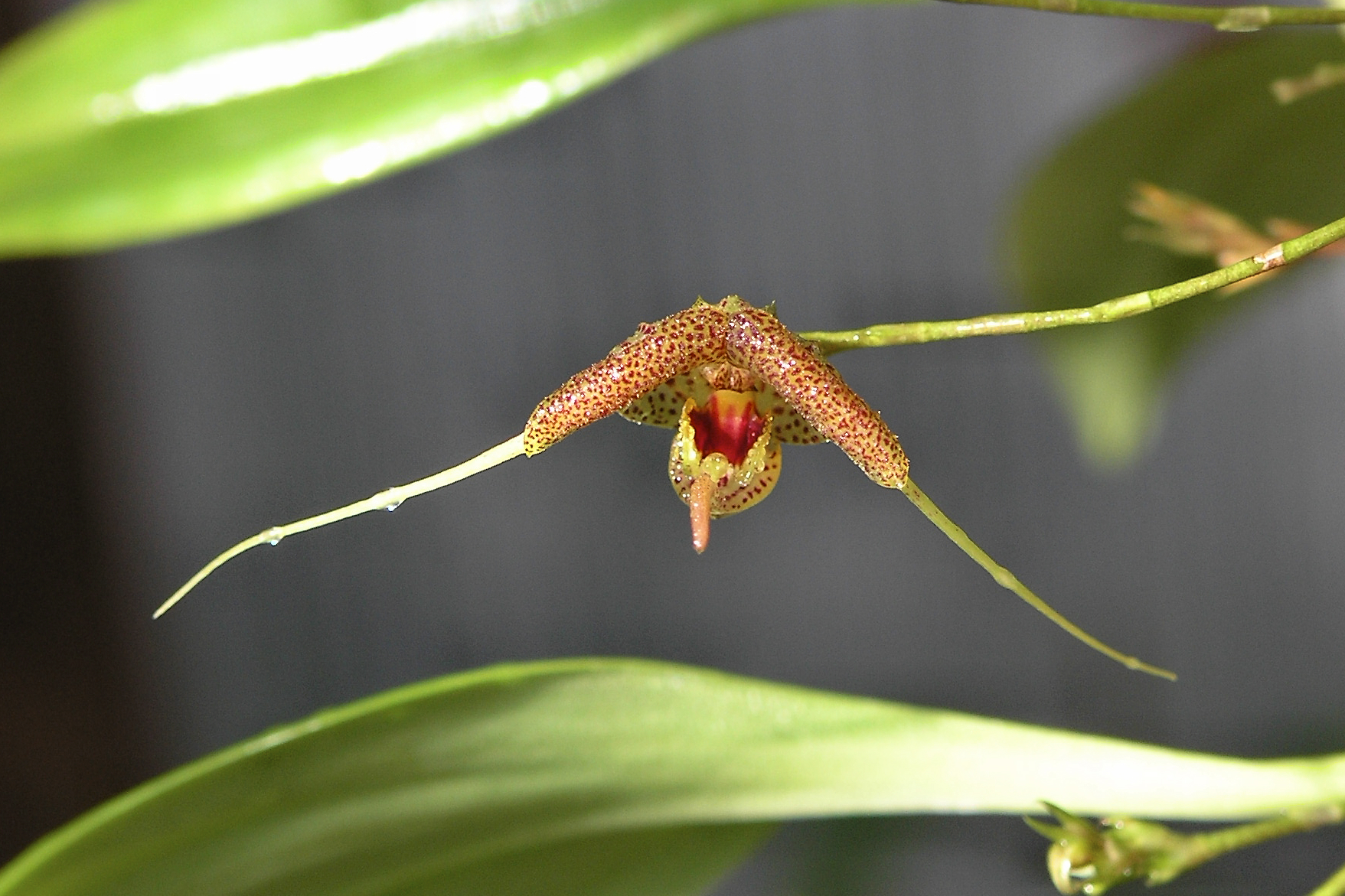
- Scaphosepalum swertiifolium

Scientific classification
- Kingdom: Plantae
- Clade: Tracheophytes
- Clade: Angiosperms
- Clade: Monocots
- Order: Asparagales
- Family: Orchidaceae
- Subfamily: Epidendroideae
- Tribe: Epidendreae
- Subtribe: Pleurothallidinae
- Genus: Scaphosepalum; Pfitzer, 1889

Type species
- Scaphosepalum verrucosum (Rchb. f.) Pfitzer

= Scaphosepalum =

Genus of orchids

Scaphosepalum (from Greek "boatlike sepals") is a genus of plants belonging to the family Orchidaceae. The species in this genus are mostly found in Central and South America, with one species extending into southern Mexico. By their genus name, many species in this genus produce unusual and distinctive flowers; some possessing cushion-like characteristics reminiscent of an African buffalo's horns, others possessing characteristics of snake fangs.

Species in this genus are epiphytic in their growth habit and according to the Royal Horticultural Society Sppm. is the genus' official abbreviation.

== Species ==
- Scaphosepalum anchoriferum (Rchb. f.) Rolfe 1890 (Costa Rica; Panama)
- Scaphosepalum andreettae Luer 1985 (Ecuador)
- Scaphosepalum antenniferum Rolfe 1890 (Ecuador; Bolivia; Colombia; Peru)
- Scaphosepalum aociorum Jiménez 2021 (Ecuador)
- Scaphosepalum beluosum Luer 1979 (Ecuador)
- Scaphosepalum bicolor Luer & R. Escobar 1981
- Scaphosepalum bicristatum Luer 2002 (Colombia)
- Scaphosepalum breve (Rchb. f.) Rolfe 1890 (Bolivia; Ecuador)
- Scaphosepalum cimex Luer & Hirtz 1988 (Ecuador)
- Scaphosepalum clavellatum Luer 1976 (Ecuador)
- Scaphosepalum cloesii Luer 1998 (Ecuador)
- Scaphosepalum dalstroemii Luer 1984 (Ecuador)
- Scaphosepalum decorum Luer & R. Escobar 1982
- Scaphosepalum delhierroi Luer & Hirtz 1991 (Ecuador)
- Scaphosepalum digitale Luer & Hirtz 1991 (Ecuador)
- Scaphosepalum dodsonii Luer 1983 (Ecuador)
- Scaphosepalum fimbriatum Luer & Hirtz 1988 (Ecuador)
- Scaphosepalum gibberosum (Rchb. f.) Rolfe 1890
- Scaphosepalum globosum Luer & Hirtz 1998 (Ecuador)
- Scaphosepalum grande Kraenzl. 1922 (Colombia)
- Scaphosepalum hirtzii Luer 1980 (Ecuador)
- Scaphosepalum jostii Luer 1998 (Ecuador)
- Scaphosepalum lima (F. Lehm. & Kraenzl.) Schltr. 1920 (Colombia)
- Scaphosepalum macrodactylum (Rchb. f.) Rolfe 1890 (Ecuador)
- Scaphosepalum manningii Luer 1998 (Venezuela)
- Scaphosepalum martineae Luer 1998 (Peru)
- Scaphosepalum medinae Luer & J.J. Portilla 2000 (Ecuador)
- Scaphosepalum merinoi Luer 2002 (Ecuador)
- Scaphosepalum microdactylum Rolfe 1893 (Costa Rica; Honduras; Panama; Mexico; Nicaragua; Ecuador)
- Scaphosepalum odontochilum Kraenzl. 1925 (Colombia; Ecuador)
- Scaphosepalum ophidion Luer 1981 (Ecuador)
- Scaphosepalum ovulare Luer 1976 (Ecuador)
- Scaphosepalum panduratum Luer & R. Escobar 1997 (Colombia)
- Scaphosepalum parviflorum Luer & Hirtz 1992 (Ecuador)
- Scaphosepalum pleurothallodes Luer & Hirtz 1992 (Ecuador)
- Scaphosepalum portillae Luer 2002 (Ecuador)
- Scaphosepalum pulvinare (Rchb. f.) Rolfe 1890 (Ecuador)
- Scaphosepalum rapax Luer 1976 (Ecuador)
- Scaphosepalum swertiifolium (Rchb. f.) Rolfe 1890 (Ecuador; Colombia)
  - Scaphosepalum swertiifolium subsp. exiguum Luer & R. Escobar (Ecuador)
  - Scaphosepalum swertiifolium subsp. swertiifolium
- Scaphosepalum tiaratum Luer 1981 (Ecuador)
- Scaphosepalum triceratops Luer & Andreetta 1988 (Ecuador)
- Scaphosepalum ursinum Luer 1979 (Ecuador)
- Scaphosepalum verrucosum (Rchb. f.) Pfitzer 1888 (Ecuador; Venezuela)
- Scaphosepalum viviparum Luer 1978
- Scaphosepalum xystra Luer 1988
