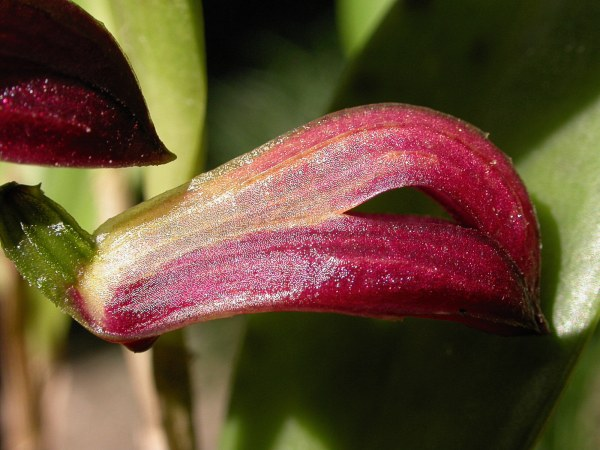
- Zootrophion atropurpureum

Scientific classification
- Kingdom: Plantae
- Clade: Tracheophytes
- Clade: Angiosperms
- Clade: Monocots
- Order: Asparagales
- Family: Orchidaceae
- Subfamily: Epidendroideae
- Tribe: Epidendreae
- Subtribe: Pleurothallidinae
- Genus: Zootrophion; Luer

Type species
- Zootrophion atropurpureum

Synonyms
- Epibator Luer

= Zootrophion =

Genus of orchids

Zootrophion (abbreviated Zo.) is a genus of 23 known species of orchid, native to Central America, South America and the West Indies. The stems have inflated, flattened sheaths. The flowers bear sepals that fuse at their tips to form box-like structures that resemble animal's heads, hence the generic name, which means "menagerie".

== Species ==
Image	Scientific name	Distribution	Elevation
	Zootrophion aguirrei P.Ortiz	Colombia	
	Zootrophion alvaroi (Garay) Luer	Colombia to Ecuador.	400–600 metres (1,300–2,000 ft)
	Zootrophion antioquianum Uribe Vélez & Sauleda	Colombia (Antioquia)	
	Zootrophion argus (Kraenzl.) Luer	Colombia	1,650–2,500 metres (5,410–8,200 ft)
	Zootrophion atropurpureum (Lindl.) Luer	Jamaica, Cuba, Hispaniola, Colombia, Ecuador, and Costa Rica	400–2,000 metres (1,300–6,600 ft)
	Zootrophion beloglottis (Schltr.) Luer	Ecuador and Peru	
	Zootrophion dayanum (Rchb.f.) Luer	Venezuela, Colombia, Peru and Ecuador	1,500–1,900 metres (4,900–6,200 ft)
	Zootrophion disciformis Vierling	South America unknown origin	
	Zootrophion dodsonii (Luer) Luer	Colombia and Ecuador	950–1,000 metres (3,120–3,280 ft)
	Zootrophion endresianum (Kraenzl.) Luer	Nicaragua, Costa Rica, Colombia and Ecuador	700–1,500 metres (2,300–4,900 ft)
	Zootrophion erlangense Roeth & Rysy	Peru	
	Zootrophion fenestratum (Lindl. ex Hook.) Rysy	Jamaica, Brazil (Rio de Janeiro to Santa Catarina)	
	Zootrophion fritzwalteri Vierling	South America unknown origin	
	Zootrophion gracilentum (Rchb.f.) Luer	Nicaragua, Costa Rica and Panama	700–1,200 metres (2,300–3,900 ft)
	Zootrophion griffin Luer	Ecuador	600–1,000 metres (2,000–3,300 ft)
	Zootrophion hirtzii Luer	Ecuador	1,300–2,100 metres (4,300–6,900 ft)
	Zootrophion hypodiscus (Rchb.f.) Luer	Panama, Colombia and Ecuador	0–1,800 metres (0–5,906 ft)
	Zootrophion ildephonsi P.Ortiz	Colombia	
	Zootrophion lappaceum Luer & R.Escobar	Colombia(Cundinamarca)	1,500 metres (4,900 ft)
	Zootrophion leonii D.E.Benn. & Christenson	Peru (Huancavelica)	2,300 metres (7,500 ft)
	Zootrophion machaqway A.Doucette & J.Portilla	Ecuador	
	Zootrophion muliebre Vierling	South America unknown origin	
	Zootrophion niveum Luer & Hirtz	Ecuador (Morona-Santiago)	900 metres (3,000 ft)
	Zootrophion oblongifolium (Rolfe) Luer	Ecuador and Peru	600–950 metres (1,970–3,120 ft)
	Zootrophion serpentinum Luer	Ecuador	1,100–1,950 metres (3,610–6,400 ft)
	Zootrophion trivalve (Luer & R.Escobar) Luer	Colombia	
	Zootrophion vasquezii Luer	Bolivia	
	Zootrophion virginalis Vierling	South America unknown origin	
	Zootrophion vulturiceps (Luer) Luer	Costa Rica	1,400–1,700 metres (4,600–5,600 ft)
	Zootrophion williamsii Luer	South America unknown origin	
	Zootrophion ximenae (Luer & Hirtz) ined.	Ecuador	900–1,500 metres (3,000–4,900 ft)
