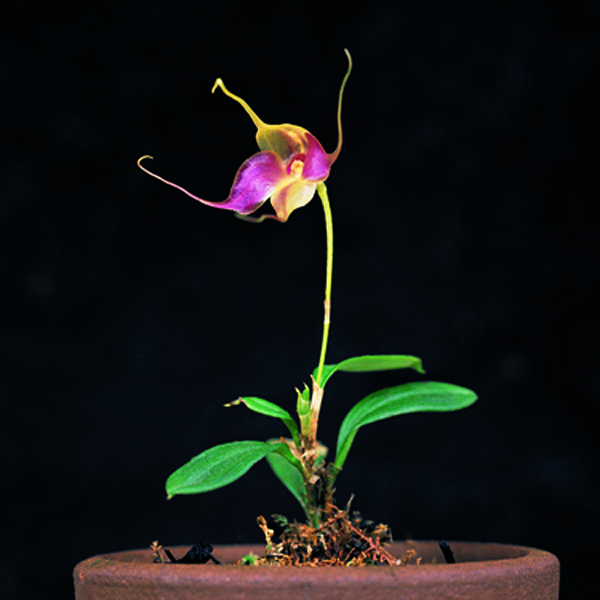

Scientific classification
- Kingdom: Plantae
- Clade: Tracheophytes
- Clade: Angiosperms
- Clade: Monocots
- Order: Asparagales
- Family: Orchidaceae
- Subfamily: Epidendroideae
- Genus: Brachionidium
- Species: B. folsomii

Binomial name
- Brachionidium folsomii Dressler (1982)

= Brachionidium folsomii =

Species of orchid

Brachionidium folsomii is a species of orchid native to Central America (Costa Rica, Guatemala, Panama).
