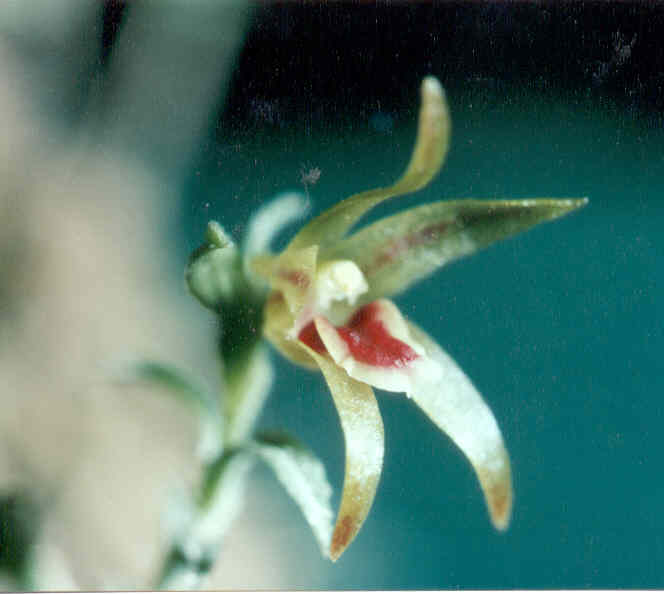
- Tomzanonia filicina

Scientific classification
- Kingdom: Plantae
- Clade: Tracheophytes
- Clade: Angiosperms
- Clade: Monocots
- Order: Asparagales
- Family: Orchidaceae
- Subfamily: Epidendroideae
- Tribe: Epidendreae
- Subtribe: Pleurothallidinae
- Genus: Tomzanonia; Nir
- Species: T. filicina

Binomial name
- Tomzanonia filicina (Dod) Nir

Synonyms
- Dilomilis filicina Dod

= Tomzanonia =

Genus of orchids

Tomzanonia is a genus of orchids, (family Orchidaceae), consisting of a single species, Tomzanonia filicina endemic to the Massif de la Hotte in Haiti.

The genus is named for Dr. Tom Zanoni of the New York Botanical Garden.
