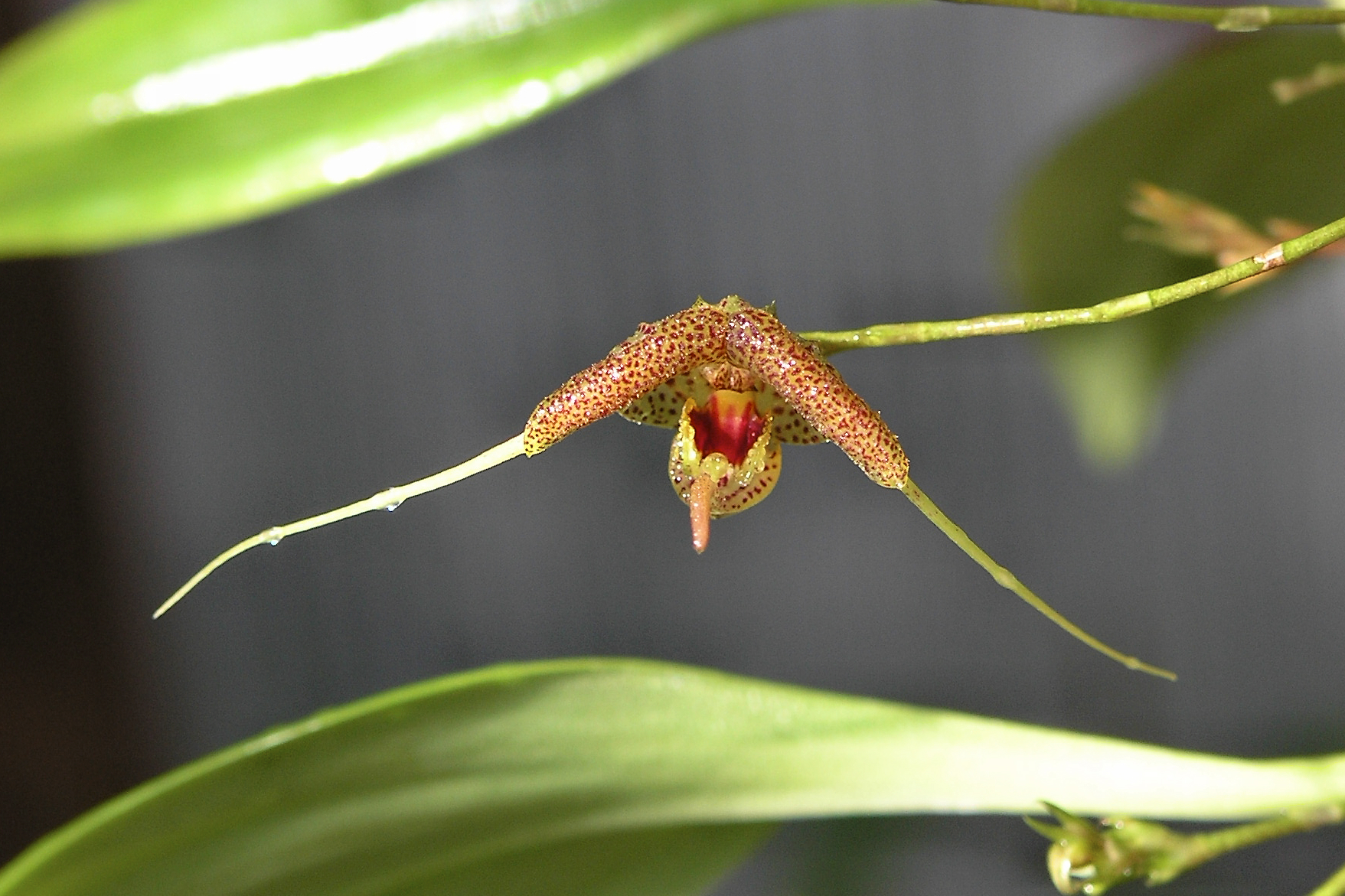
- Flower of Scaphosepalum swertiifolium

Scientific classification
- Kingdom: Plantae
- Clade: Tracheophytes
- Clade: Angiosperms
- Clade: Monocots
- Order: Asparagales
- Family: Orchidaceae
- Subfamily: Epidendroideae
- Genus: Scaphosepalum
- Species: S. swertiifolium

Binomial name
- Scaphosepalum swertiifolium (Rchb.f.) Rolfe

Synonyms
- Masdevallia swertiifolia Rchb.f. (basionym); Scaphosepalum platypetalum Schltr.

= Scaphosepalum swertiifolium =

Species of orchid

Scaphosepalum swertiifolium is a species of orchid found from Colombia to Ecuador.

- Media related to Scaphosepalum swertiifolium at Wikimedia Commons
- Data related to Scaphosepalum swertiifolium at Wikispecies
