= Platystele ornata =

Scientific classification
- Kingdom: Plantae
- Clade: Tracheophytes
- Clade: Angiosperms
- Clade: Monocots
- Order: Asparagales
- Family: Orchidaceae
- Subfamily: Epidendroideae
- Genus: Platystele
- Species: P. ornata

Binomial name
- Platystele ornata Garay

Species of plant

Platystele ornata is a miniature orchid (family Orchidaceae) endemic to the cloud forests of Guatopo National Park in Venezuela. It has been known to the outside world only since 1958. Its maroon flowers measure only 1.5 mm in width.
