= Echinosepala balaeniceps =

Scientific classification
- Kingdom: Plantae
- Clade: Tracheophytes
- Clade: Angiosperms
- Clade: Monocots
- Order: Asparagales
- Family: Orchidaceae
- Subfamily: Epidendroideae
- Genus: Echinosepala
- Species: E. balaeniceps

Binomial name
- Echinosepala balaeniceps (Luer & Dressler) Pridgeon & M.W.Chase

Synonyms
- Pleurothallis balaeniceps Luer & Dressler

Species of orchid

Echinosepala balaeniceps is a species of orchid plant native to Panama.
