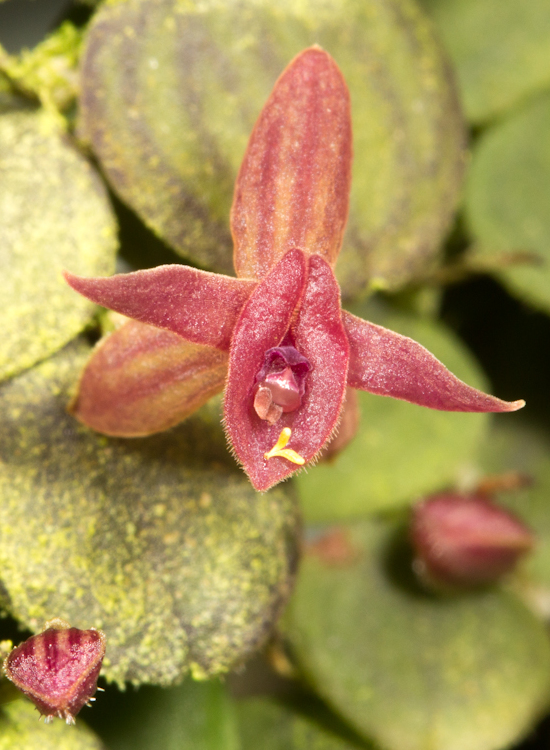
- Andinia vieira-pereziana

Scientific classification
- Kingdom: Plantae
- Clade: Tracheophytes
- Clade: Angiosperms
- Clade: Monocots
- Order: Asparagales
- Family: Orchidaceae
- Subfamily: Epidendroideae
- Subtribe: Pleurothallidinae
- Genus: Andinia (Luer) Luer

= Andinia (plant) =

Genus of plants

Andinia is a genus of flowering plants with 79 accepted species as of may 2025 belonging to the family Orchidaceae.

Its native range is Western South America to Venezuela.

Species:

- Andinia ariasiana (Luer & L.Jost) Karremans & S.V.Uribe
- Andinia auriculata (Archila) Karremans & S.V.Uribe
- Andinia bifida (Tobar & Archila) Karremans & S.V.Uribe
- Andinia cardiocheila (Luer & R.Escobar) Karremans & S.V.Uribe
- Andinia catella (Luer & R.Escobar) Karremans & S.V.Uribe
- Andinia caveroi (D.E.Benn. & Christenson) Karremans & S.V.Uribe
- Andinia chaoae (S.V.Uribe & L.Jost) Karremans & S.V.Uribe
- Andinia chelosepala (Luer & Hirtz) Karremans & S.V.Uribe
- Andinia chilopsis (Luer & Hirtz) Karremans & S.V.Uribe
- Andinia ciliaris (Luer & Hirtz) Karremans & S.V.Uribe
- Andinia composita (Luer & R.Escobar) Karremans & S.V.Uribe
- Andinia cordilabia (Luer) Karremans & S.V.Uribe
- Andinia dactyla (Garay) Karremans & S.V.Uribe
- Andinia dalstroemii (Luer) Pridgeon & M.W.Chase
- Andinia dentata (Archila) Karremans & S.V.Uribe
- Andinia destituta (Luer & R.Escobar) Karremans & S.V.Uribe
- Andinia dielsii (Mansf.) Luer
- Andinia erepsis (Luer & Hirtz) Karremans & S.V.Uribe
- Andinia exigua (Luer & L.Jost) Karremans & S.V.Uribe
- Andinia geminipetala (Luer & J.Portilla) Karremans & S.V.Uribe
- Andinia hippocrepica (Luer & R.Escobar) Karremans & S.V.Uribe
- Andinia hirtzii Luer
- Andinia hystricosa (Luer) Pridgeon & M.W.Chase
- Andinia ibex (Luer) Pridgeon & M.W.Chase
- Andinia irrasa (Luer & R.Escobar) Karremans & S.V.Uribe
- Andinia lappacea (Luer) Pridgeon & M.W.Chase
- Andinia longiserpens (C.Schweinf.) Karremans & Mark Wilson
- Andinia lueri S.V.Uribe & Karremans
- Andinia lunaris (Luer) Karremans & S.V.Uribe
- Andinia lunatocheila (Tobar & Archila) Karremans & S.V.Uribe
- Andinia lupula (Luer & Hirtz) Karremans & S.V.Uribe
- Andinia lynniana (Luer) Karremans & S.V.Uribe
- Andinia macrotica (Luer & Dalström) Karremans & S.V.Uribe
- Andinia masdevalliopsis (Luer) Karremans & Mark Wilson
- Andinia micropetala (L.O.Williams) Karremans & S.V.Uribe
- Andinia mongei (Tobar & Archila) Karremans & S.V.Uribe
- Andinia monilia (Luer & R.Escobar) Karremans & S.V.Uribe
- Andinia montis-rotundi (P.Ortiz) Karremans & S.V.Uribe
- Andinia nummularia (Rchb.f.) Karremans & S.V.Uribe
- Andinia obesa S.V.Uribe & Karremans
- Andinia octocornuta (Luer) Karremans & S.V.Uribe
- Andinia ortiziana (S.V.Uribe & Thoerle) Karremans & S.V.Uribe
- Andinia panica (Luer & Dalström) Pridgeon & M.W.Chase
- Andinia pendens (Garay) Karremans & S.V.Uribe
- Andinia pensilis (Schltr.) Luer
- Andinia pentamytera (Luer) Pridgeon & M.W.Chase
- Andinia persimilis (Luer & Sijm) Karremans & S.V.Uribe
- Andinia phallica (Tobar & Archila) Karremans & S.V.Uribe
- Andinia pholeter (Luer) Karremans & S.V.Uribe
- Andinia pilosella (Rchb.f.) Karremans & S.V.Uribe
- Andinia platysepala (Luer & R.Escobar) Karremans & S.V.Uribe
- Andinia pogonion (Luer) Pridgeon & M.W.Chase
- Andinia pseudocaulescens (L.B.Sm. & S.K.Harris) Karremans & S.V.Uribe
- Andinia ricii (Luer & R.Vásquez) Karremans & S.V.Uribe
- Andinia rosea (Archila) Karremans & S.V.Uribe
- Andinia rotunda (Archila) Karremans & S.V.Uribe
- Andinia schizopogon (Luer) Pridgeon & M.W.Chase
- Andinia sibundoyensis (Kolan.) Karremans & S.V.Uribe
- Andinia spiralis (Ruiz & Pav.) Karremans & Mark Wilson
- Andinia stalactites (Luer & Hirtz) Karremans & S.V.Uribe
- Andinia sudamericana (Archila) Karremans & S.V.Uribe
- Andinia sunchubambensis A.Doucette & Janovec
- Andinia tingomariana A.G.Diaz & Mark Wilson
- Andinia triangularis (Luer) Karremans & S.V.Uribe
- Andinia trimytera (Luer & R.Escobar) Pridgeon & M.W.Chase
- Andinia uchucayensis A.Doucette & J.Portilla
- Andinia ursula (Luer & R.Escobar) Karremans & S.V.Uribe
- Andinia vestigipetala (Luer) Pridgeon & M.W.Chase
- Andinia viebrockiana (Luer & L.Jost) Karremans & S.V.Uribe
- Andinia vieira-pereziana (P.Ortiz) Karremans & S.V.Uribe
- Andinia villosa (Løjtnant) Karremans & S.V.Uribe
- Andinia werneri (Luer) Karremans & S.V.Uribe
- Andinia xenion (Luer & R.Escobar) Karremans & Mark Wilson
