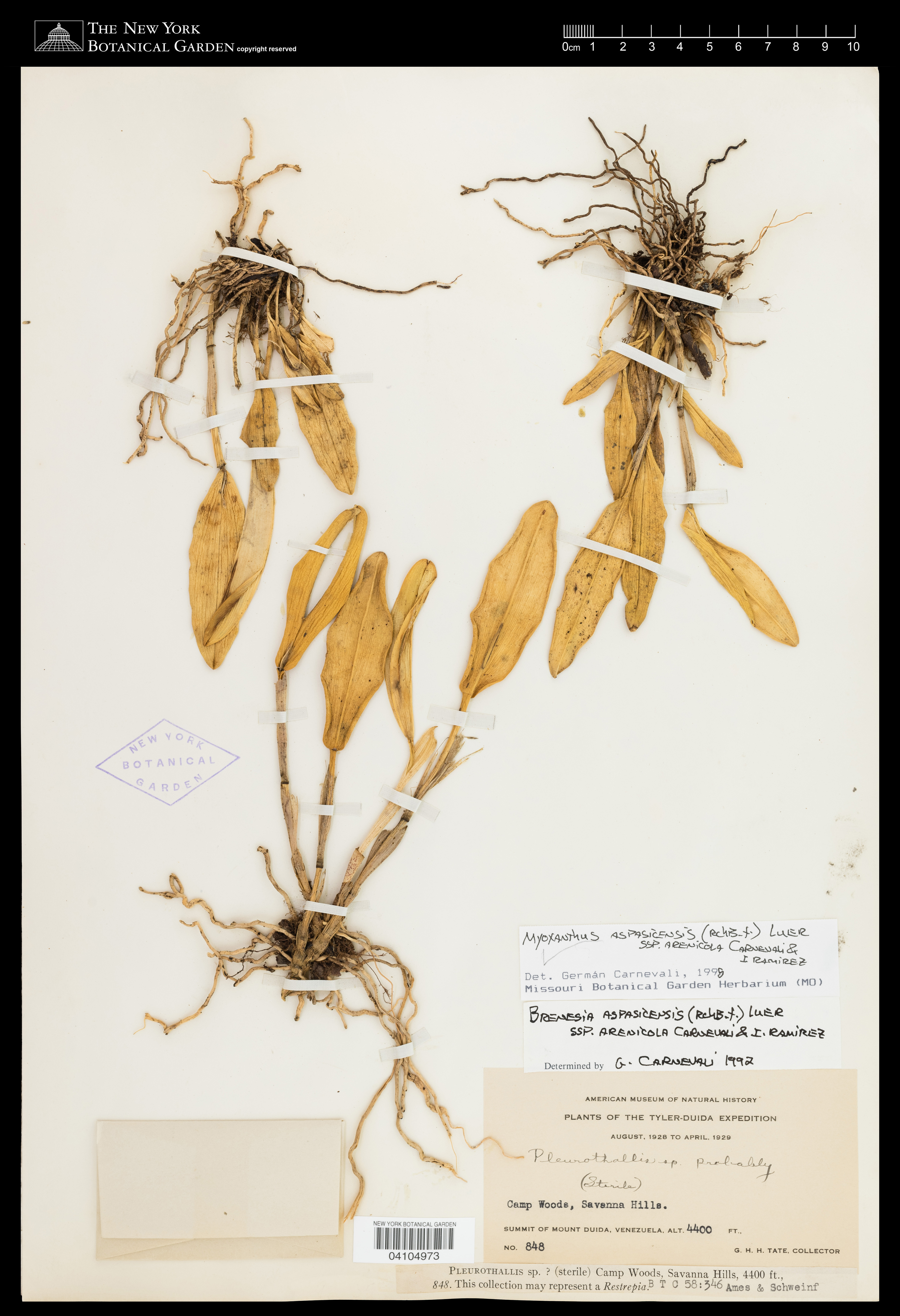

Scientific classification
- Kingdom: Plantae
- Clade: Tracheophytes
- Clade: Angiosperms
- Clade: Monocots
- Order: Asparagales
- Family: Orchidaceae
- Subfamily: Epidendroideae
- Genus: Echinosepala
- Species: E. aspasicensis

Binomial name
- Echinosepala aspasicensis (Rchb.f.) Pridgeon & M.W.Chase

Synonyms
- Pleurothallis aspasicensis Rchb.f.

= Echinosepala aspasicensis =

Species of orchid

Echinosepala aspasicensis is a species of orchid plant native to Venezuela.
