= Echinosepala stonei =

Scientific classification
- Kingdom: Plantae
- Clade: Tracheophytes
- Clade: Angiosperms
- Clade: Monocots
- Order: Asparagales
- Family: Orchidaceae
- Subfamily: Epidendroideae
- Genus: Echinosepala
- Species: E. stonei

Binomial name
- Echinosepala stonei (Luer) Pridgeon & M.W.Chase

Synonyms
- Pleurothallis stonei Luer

Species of plant

Echinosepala stonei is a species of orchid plant native to Costa Rica.
