= Lepanthopsis melanantha =

Tiny orchid

Scientific classification
- Kingdom: Plantae
- Clade: Tracheophytes
- Clade: Angiosperms
- Clade: Monocots
- Order: Asparagales
- Family: Orchidaceae
- Subfamily: Epidendroideae
- Genus: Lepanthopsis
- Species: L. melanantha

Binomial name
- Lepanthopsis melanantha (Rchb.f.) Ames

Synonyms
- Pleurothallis melanantha Rchb.f; Pleurothallis floripicta Lindl. ex Griseb., without description; Lepanthes brevipetala Fawc. & Rendle; Lepanthes harrisii Fawc. & Rendle; Lepanthopsis quisqueyana Dod

Species of orchid

Lepanthopsis melanantha, common name tiny orchid, is a very small epiphytic species of orchid. It is native to southern Florida and the Greater Antilles (Cuba, Hispaniola, Jamaica, Puerto Rico). In Florida, it is known only from the Fahkahatchee Swamp in Collier County.
