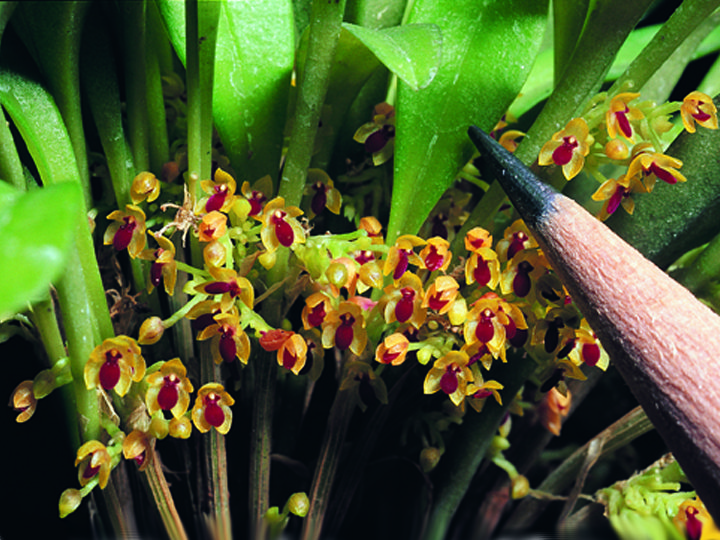
- Platystele stenostachya

Scientific classification
- Kingdom: Plantae
- Clade: Embryophytes
- Clade: Tracheophytes
- Clade: Spermatophytes
- Clade: Angiosperms
- Clade: Monocots
- Order: Asparagales
- Family: Orchidaceae
- Subfamily: Epidendroideae
- Tribe: Epidendreae
- Subtribe: Pleurothallidinae
- Genus: Platystele; Schltr. (1910)

Species
- 123; see text

Synonyms
- Rubellia (Luer) Luer (2004)

= Platystele =

Genus of orchids

Platystele is a genus of orchids, comprising 123 species. Most of these have small flowers, some of the smallest in the family. The genus is widespread across Mexico, Central America, Cuba, and South America as far south as Bolivia, but infrequent in Brazil.

== Selected species ==
123 species are accepted. They include:

- Platystele acicularis
- Platystele calantha
- Platystele caudatisepala
- Platystele dasyglossa
- Platystele examen-culicum
- Platystele finleyae
- Platystele gaileana
- Platystele hirtzii
- Platystele jungermannioides
- Platystele microscopica
- Platystele misera
- Platystele ornata
- Platystele oxyglossa
- Platystele portillae
- Platystele posadarum
- Platystele pubescens
- Platystele reflexa
- Platystele resimula
- Platystele stenostachya
- Platystele umbellata
- Platystele viridis
- Platystele ximenae
- Platystele tica

== Images ==
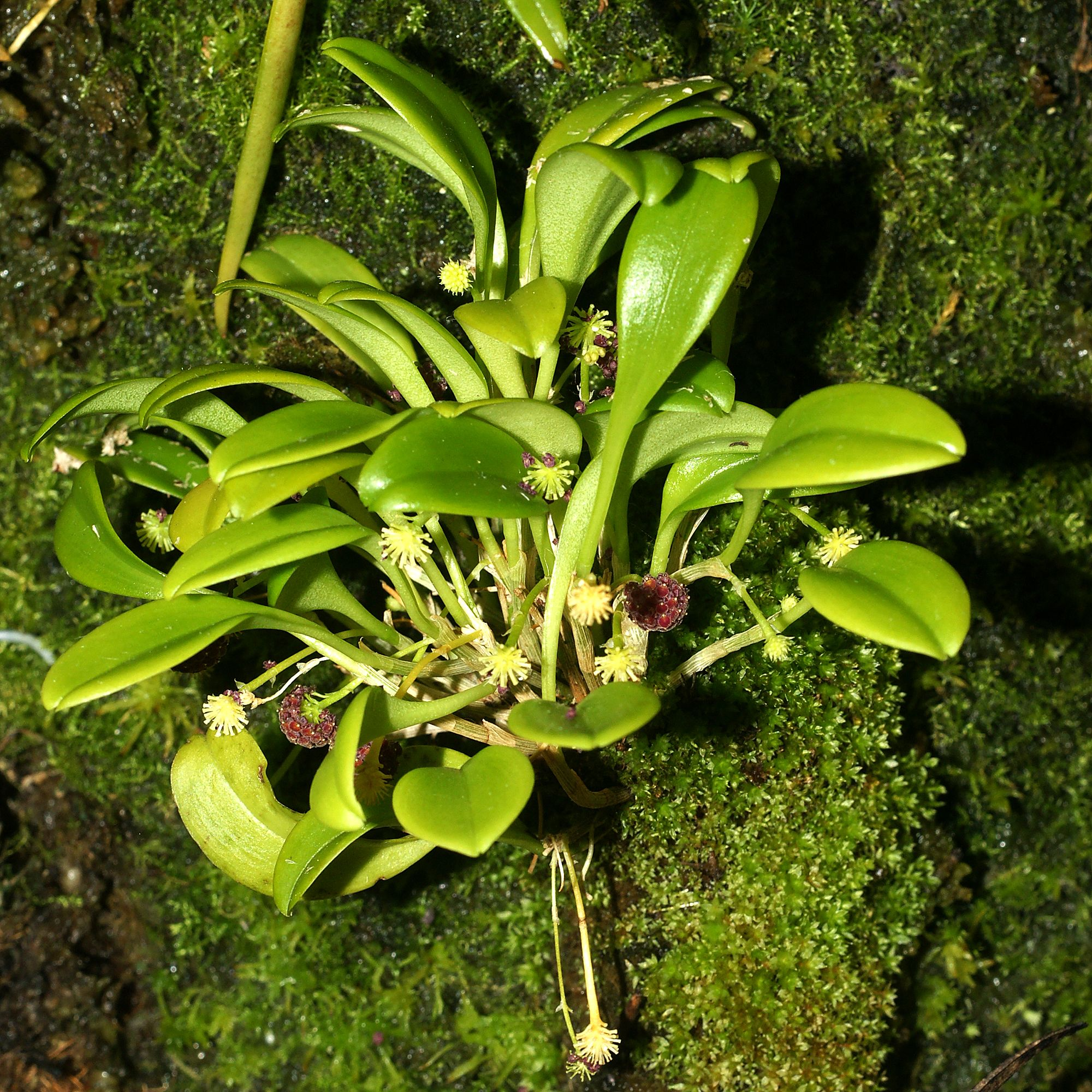
Platystele umbellata

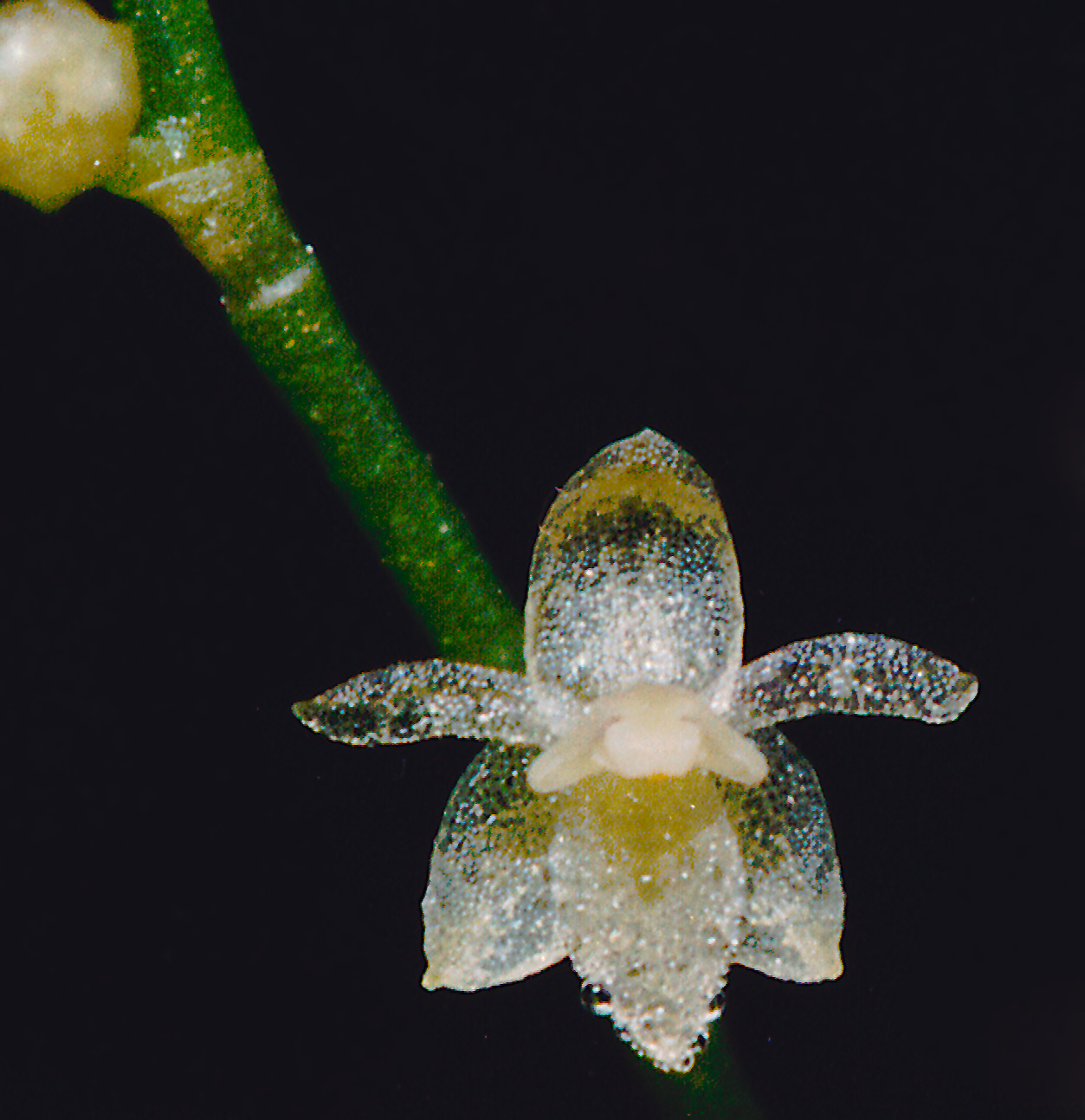
Unidentified Platystele

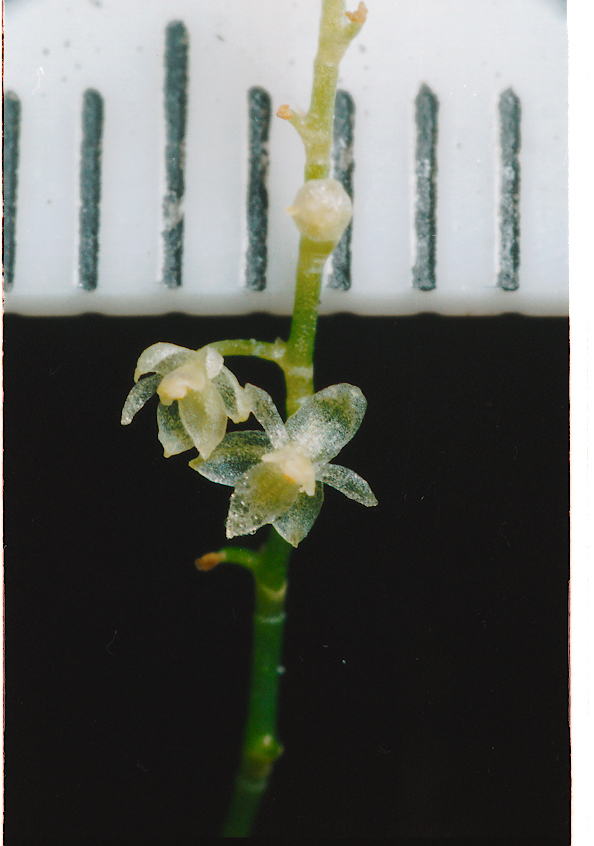
Unidentified Platystele
