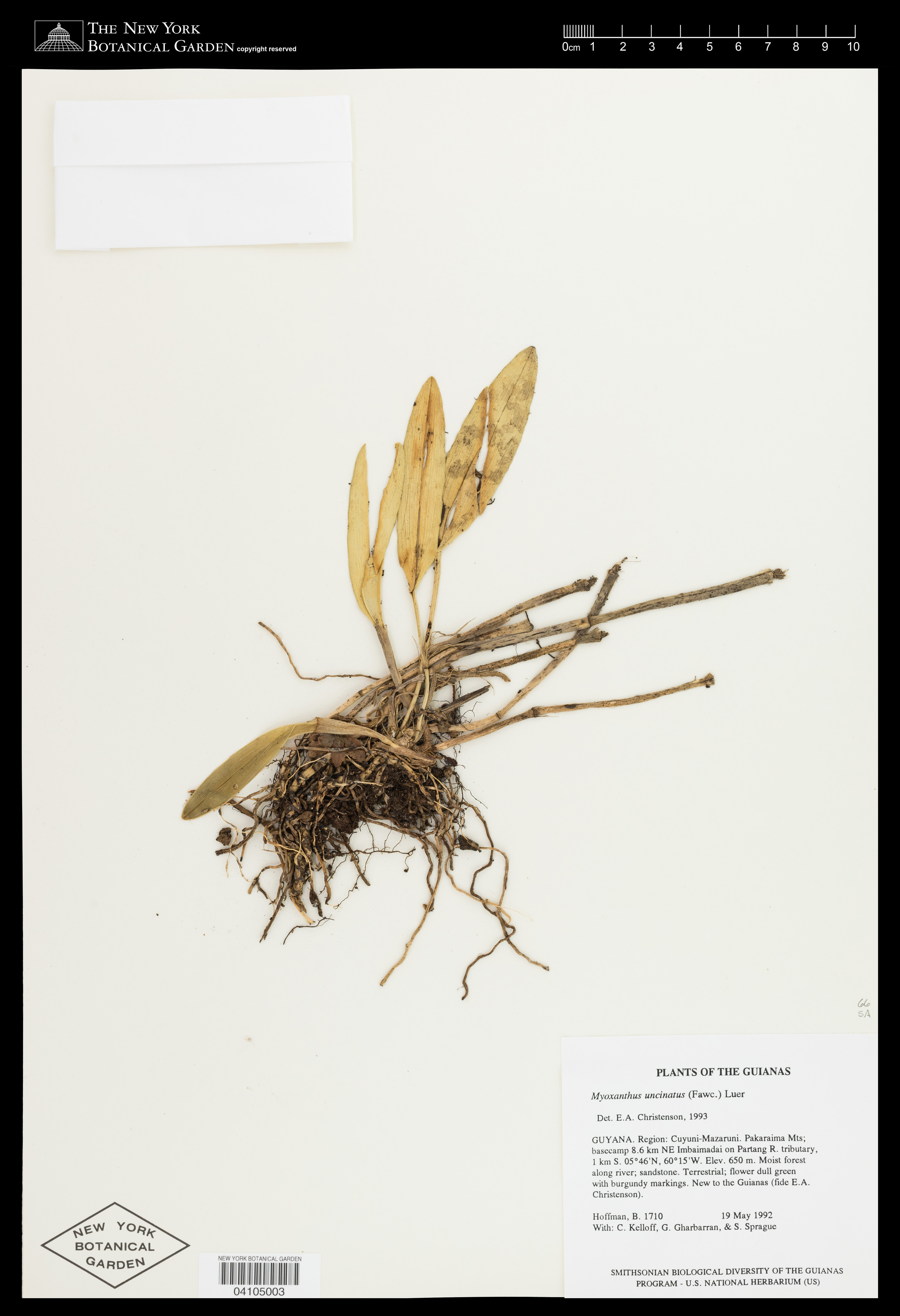

Scientific classification
- Kingdom: Plantae
- Clade: Tracheophytes
- Clade: Angiosperms
- Clade: Monocots
- Order: Asparagales
- Family: Orchidaceae
- Subfamily: Epidendroideae
- Genus: Echinosepala
- Species: E. uncinata

Binomial name
- Echinosepala uncinata (Fawc.) Pridgeon & M.W.Chase

Synonyms
- Pleurothallis uncinata Fawc.

= Echinosepala uncinata =

Species of plant

Echinosepala uncinata is a species of orchid plant native to Jamaica .
