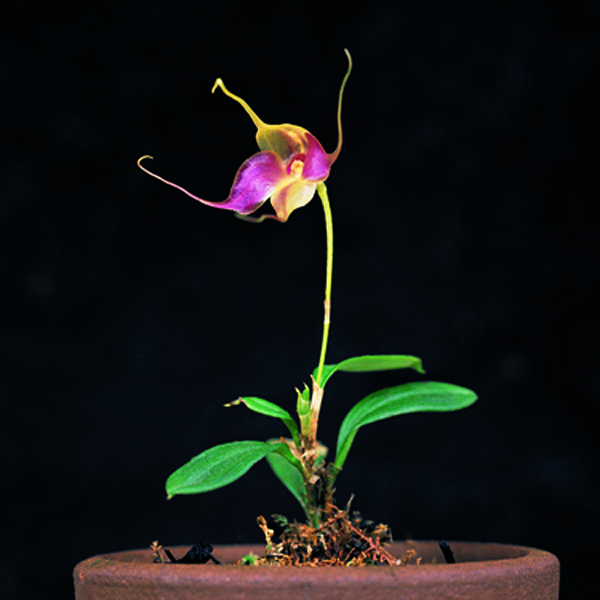
- Brachionidium folsomii

Scientific classification
- Kingdom: Plantae
- Clade: Tracheophytes
- Clade: Angiosperms
- Clade: Monocots
- Order: Asparagales
- Family: Orchidaceae
- Subfamily: Epidendroideae
- Tribe: Epidendreae
- Subtribe: Pleurothallidinae
- Genus: Brachionidium; Lindl.

Synonyms
- Yolanda Hoehne

= Brachionidium =

Cup orchids

Genus of orchids

Brachionidium (or cup orchid) is a genus of about 72 species of orchids, found throughout much of tropical America (Central America, the West Indies, and South America as far south as Brazil and Bolivia). The generic name comes from Greek ("little arm") and refers to the protrusions on the stigma.

== List of species ==
Accepted species:

1. Brachionidium alpestre Luer & R.Vásquez, Monogr. Syst. Bot. Missouri Bot. Gard. 57: 12 (1995).
2. Brachionidium andreettae Luer & Hirtz, Monogr. Syst. Bot. Missouri Bot. Gard. 57: 14 (1995).
3. Brachionidium arethusa Luer, Monogr. Syst. Bot. Missouri Bot. Gard. 57: 16 (1995).
4. Brachionidium ballatrix Luer & Hirtz, Monogr. Syst. Bot. Missouri Bot. Gard. 57: 18 (1995).
5. Brachionidium brachycladum Luer & R.Escobar, Orquideologia 16: 33 (1986).
6. Brachionidium brevicaudatum Rolfe, Trans. Linn. Soc. London, Bot. 6: 59 (1896).
7. Brachionidium calypso Luer, Monogr. Syst. Bot. Missouri Bot. Gard. 57: 24 (1995).
8. Brachionidium capillare Luer & Hirtz, Monogr. Syst. Bot. Missouri Bot. Gard. 57: 26 (1995).
9. Brachionidium ciliolatum Garay, J. Arnold Arbor. 50: 464 (1969).
10. Brachionidium condorense L.Jost, Selbyana 25: 11 (2004).
11. Brachionidium cruzae L.O.Williams, Brittonia 14: 441 (1962).
12. Brachionidium dalstroemii Luer, Lindleyana 1: 170 (1986).
13. Brachionidium deflexum L.Jost, Selbyana 25: 13 (2004).
14. Brachionidium dentatum Luer & Dressler, Monogr. Syst. Bot. Missouri Bot. Gard. 57: 34 (1995).
15. Brachionidium diaphanum Luer & R.Vásquez, Phytologia 55: 175 (1984).
16. Brachionidium dodsonii Luer, Monogr. Syst. Bot. Missouri Bot. Gard. 57: 38 (1995).
17. Brachionidium dressleri Luer, Monogr. Syst. Bot. Missouri Bot. Gard. 57: 40 (1995).
18. Brachionidium ecuadorense Garay, Can. J. Bot. 34: 731 (1956).
19. Brachionidium elegans Luer & Hirtz, Orchidee (Hamburg) 37: 23 (1986).
20. Brachionidium ephemerum Luer & Hirtz, Monogr. Syst. Bot. Missouri Bot. Gard. 57: 46 (1995).
21. Brachionidium escobarii Luer, Lindleyana 1: 172 (1986).
22. Brachionidium filamentosum Luer & Hirtz, Monogr. Syst. Bot. Missouri Bot. Gard. 57: 50 (1995).
23. Brachionidium folsomii Dressler, Orquideologia 15: 154 (1982).
24. Brachionidium fornicatum Luer & Hirtz, Monogr. Syst. Bot. Missouri Bot. Gard. 57: 54 (1995).
25. Brachionidium furfuraceum Luer, Monogr. Syst. Bot. Missouri Bot. Gard. 57: 56 (1995).
26. Brachionidium galeatum Luer & Hirtz, Monogr. Syst. Bot. Missouri Bot. Gard. 57: 58 (1995).
27. Brachionidium gonzalesiorum Becerra, Arnaldoa 12: 56 (2005).
28. Brachionidium haberi Luer, Monogr. Syst. Bot. Missouri Bot. Gard. 57: 60 (1995).
29. Brachionidium hirtzii Luer, Lindleyana 1: 174 (1986).
30. Brachionidium imperiale Luer & Hirtz ex Harling & L.Andersson, in Fl. Ecuador 76: 97 (2005).
31. Brachionidium ingramii Luer & Dalström, Monogr. Syst. Bot. Missouri Bot. Gard. 61(4): 1 (1996).
32. Brachionidium jesupiae Luer, Monogr. Syst. Bot. Missouri Bot. Gard. 57: 66 (1995).
33. Brachionidium juliani Carnevali & I.Ramírez, Ernstia 39: 6 (1986).
34. Brachionidium kuhniarum Dressler, Orquideologia 15: 157 (1982).
35. Brachionidium lehmannii Luer, Monogr. Syst. Bot. Missouri Bot. Gard. 57: 72 (1995).
36. Brachionidium longicaudatum Ames & C.Schweinf., Bull. Torrey Bot. Club 58: 348 (1931).
37. Brachionidium loxense Luer, Monogr. Syst. Bot. Missouri Bot. Gard. 57: 76 (1995).
38. Brachionidium lucanoideum Luer, Monogr. Syst. Bot. Missouri Bot. Gard. 57: 78 (1995).
39. Brachionidium machupicchuense N.Salinas & Christenson, Orchids 71: 717 (2002).
40. Brachionidium meridense Garay, Can. J. Bot. 34: 736 (1956).
41. Brachionidium minusculum Luer & Dressler, Monogr. Syst. Bot. Missouri Bot. Gard. 57: 82 (1995).
42. Brachionidium muscosum Luer & R.Vásquez, Phytologia 55: 176 (1984).
43. Brachionidium neblinense Carnevali & I.Ramírez, Ernstia 39: 9 (1986).
44. Brachionidium operosum Luer & Hirtz, Monogr. Syst. Bot. Missouri Bot. Gard. 57: 86 (1995).
45. Brachionidium parvifolium (Lindl.) Lindl., Fol. Orchid. 8: 1 (1859).
46. Brachionidium parvum Cogn., Repert. Spec. Nov. Regni Veg. 6: 307 (1909).
47. Brachionidium peltarion Luer, Monogr. Syst. Bot. Missouri Bot. Gard. 57: 92 (1995).
48. Brachionidium pepe-portillae Luer & Hirtz, Monogr. Syst. Bot. Missouri Bot. Gard. 103: 309 (2005).
49. Brachionidium phalangiferum Garay, Can. J. Bot. 34: 738 (1956).
50. Brachionidium piuntzae Luer, Monogr. Syst. Bot. Missouri Bot. Gard. 57: 96 (1995).
51. Brachionidium polypodium Luer, Monogr. Syst. Bot. Missouri Bot. Gard. 57: 98 (1995).
52. Brachionidium portillae Luer, Lindleyana 1: 176 (1986).
53. Brachionidium pteroglossum Luer, Phytologia 55: 176 (1984).
54. Brachionidium puraceense Luer, Monogr. Syst. Bot. Missouri Bot. Gard. 57: 104 (1995).
55. Brachionidium pusillum Ames & C.Schweinf., Schedul. Orchid. 10: 52 (1930).
56. Brachionidium quatuor Becerra, Arnaldoa 12: 57 (2005).
57. Brachionidium renzii Luer, Lindleyana 11: 118 (1996).
58. Brachionidium restrepioides (Hoehne) Pabst, Orchid. Bras.: 166 (1975).
59. Brachionidium rugosum Luer & Hirtz, Lindleyana 1: 178 (1986).
60. Brachionidium satyreum Luer, Monogr. Syst. Bot. Missouri Bot. Gard. 57: 112 (1995).
61. Brachionidium serratum Schltr., Repert. Spec. Nov. Regni Veg. 9: 164 (1911).
62. Brachionidium sherringii Rolfe, Bull. Misc. Inform. Kew 1893: 4 (1893).
63. Brachionidium simplex Garay, Can. J. Bot. 34: 741 (1956).
64. Brachionidium stellare Luer & Hirtz, Monogr. Syst. Bot. Missouri Bot. Gard. 57: 120 (1995).
65. Brachionidium syme-morrisii Luer, Monogr. Syst. Bot. Missouri Bot. Gard. 57: 122 (1995).
66. Brachionidium tetrapetalum (F.Lehm. & Kraenzl.) Schltr., Repert. Spec. Nov. Regni Veg. Beih. 7: 241 (1920).
67. Brachionidium tuberculatum Lindl., Fol. Orchid. 8: 6 (1859).
68. Brachionidium uxorium Luer & R.Vásquez, Monogr. Syst. Bot. Missouri Bot. Gard. 57: 130 (1995).
69. Brachionidium valerioi Ames & C.Schweinf., Schedul. Orchid. 10: 53 (1930).
70. Brachionidium vasquezii Luer, Phytologia 55: 177 (1984).
71. Brachionidium yanachagaensis Becerra, Arnaldoa 12: 56 (2005).
72. Brachionidium zunagense Luer & Hirtz, Monogr. Syst. Bot. Missouri Bot. Gard. 57: 136 (1995).
