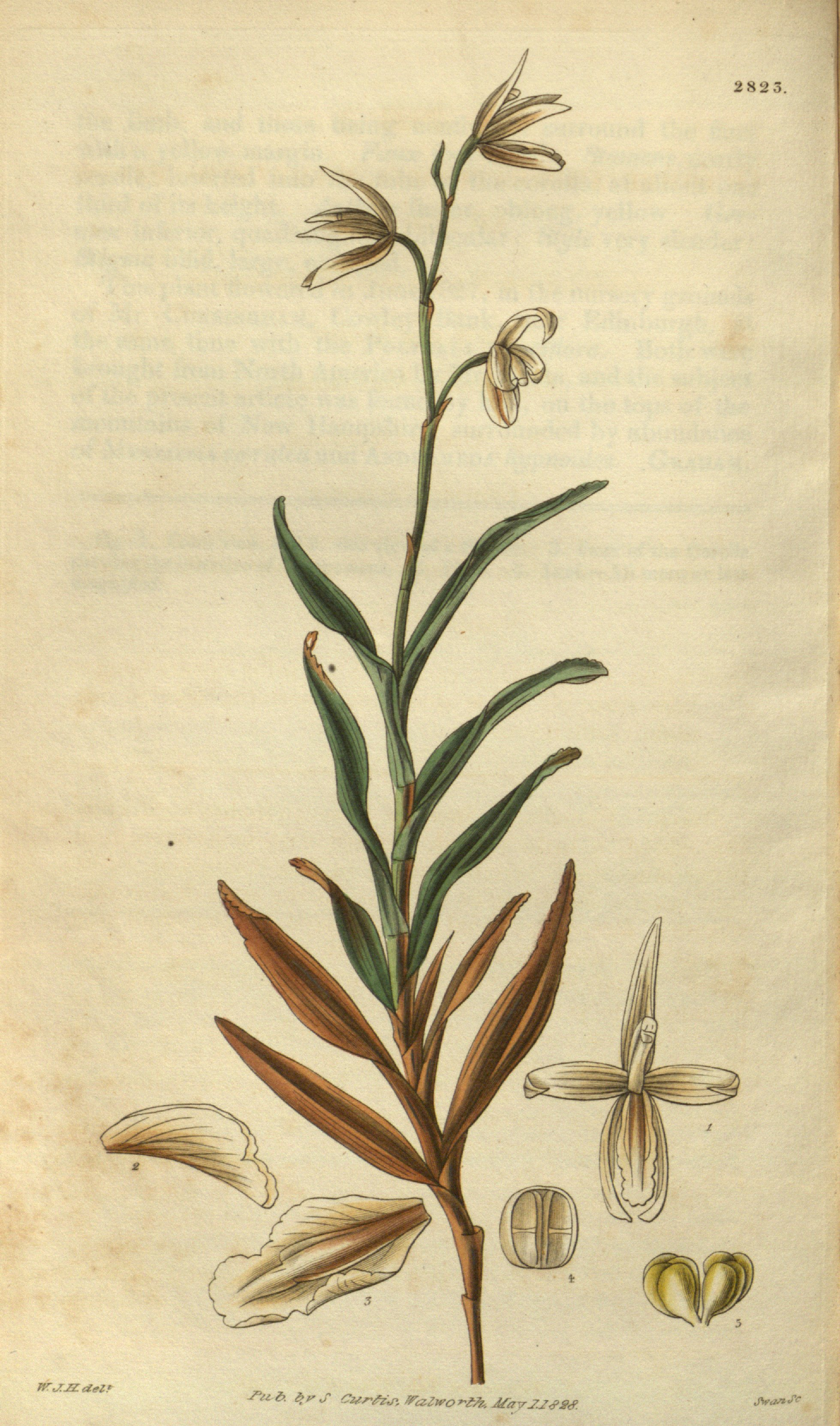
- Dilomilis montana

Scientific classification
- Kingdom: Plantae
- Clade: Tracheophytes
- Clade: Angiosperms
- Clade: Monocots
- Order: Asparagales
- Family: Orchidaceae
- Subfamily: Epidendroideae
- Tribe: Epidendreae
- Subtribe: Pleurothallidinae
- Genus: Dilomilis; Raf.

Synonyms
- Octadesmia Benth.

= Dilomilis =

Genus of orchids

Dilomilis is a genus of orchids, (family Orchidaceae), consisting of five species in the Greater Antilles.

The genus is named for its bicallose lip.

1. Dilomilis bissei H.Dietr. - Cuba
2. Dilomilis elata (Benth.) Summerh. - Cuba, Jamaica
3. Dilomilis montana (Sw.) Summerh. - Cuba, Jamaica, Dominican Republic, Puerto Rico
4. Dilomilis oligophylla (Schltr.) Summerh. - Cuba
5. Dilomilis scirpoidea (Schltr.) Summerh. - Dominican Republic
