= Chamelophyton =

Scientific classification
- Kingdom: Plantae
- Clade: Tracheophytes
- Clade: Angiosperms
- Clade: Monocots
- Order: Asparagales
- Family: Orchidaceae
- Subfamily: Epidendroideae
- Tribe: Epidendreae
- Subtribe: Pleurothallidinae
- Genus: Chamelophyton; Garay
- Species: C. kegelii

Binomial name
- Chamelophyton kegelii (Rchb.f.) Garay

Synonyms
- Garayella Brieger; Restrepia kegelii Rchb.f.; Barbosella kegelii (Rchb.f.) Schltr.; Pleurothallis hexandra Garay & Dunst.; Garayella hexandra (Garay & Dunst.) Brieger

Genus of orchids

Chamelophyton is a genus of orchids. As of May 2014, only one species is known, Chamelophyton kegelii, native to Suriname and Venezuela.
