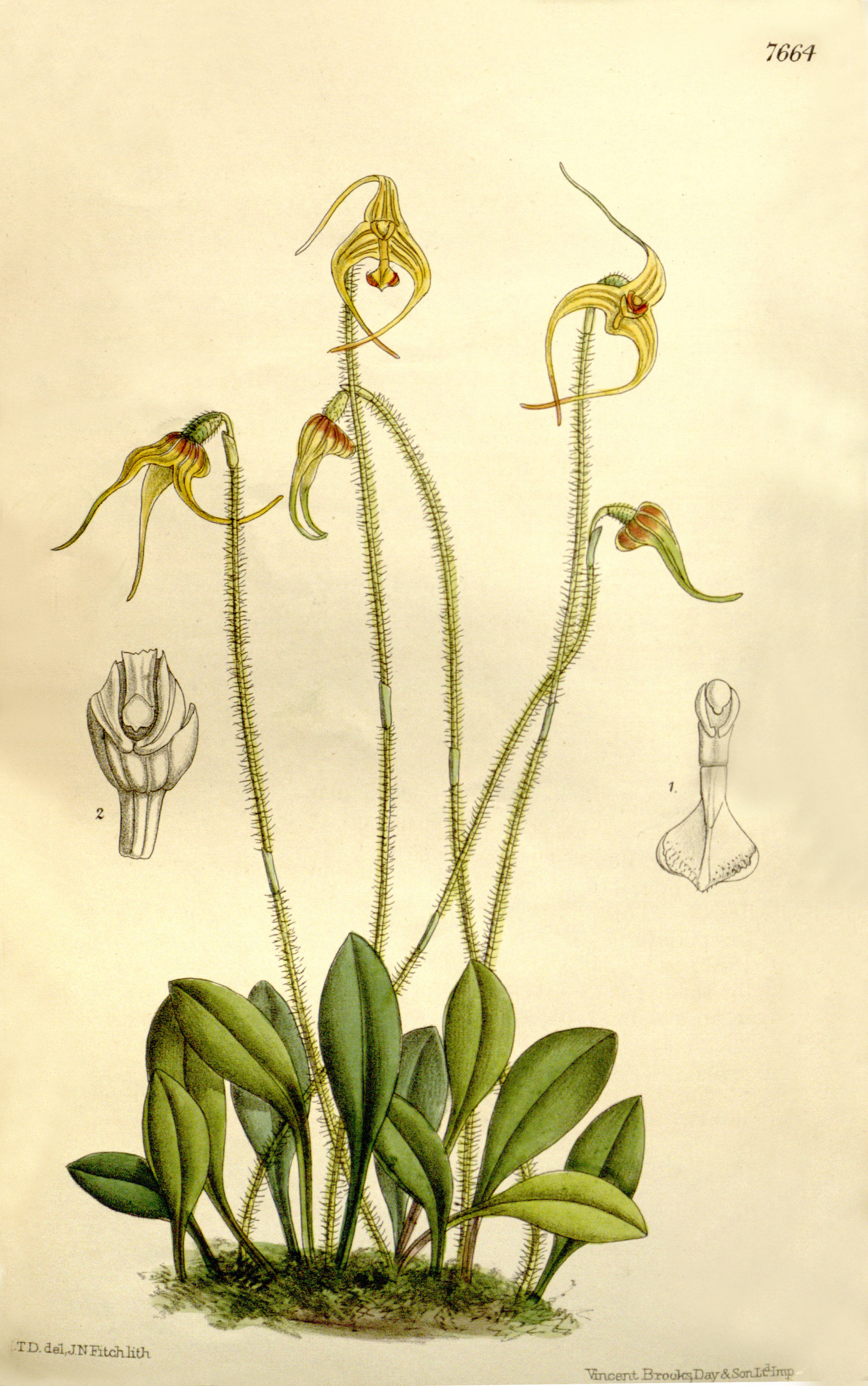
- Porroglossum muscosum 1899 illustration

Scientific classification
- Kingdom: Plantae
- Clade: Embryophytes
- Clade: Tracheophytes
- Clade: Spermatophytes
- Clade: Angiosperms
- Clade: Monocots
- Order: Asparagales
- Family: Orchidaceae
- Subfamily: Epidendroideae
- Tribe: Epidendreae
- Subtribe: Pleurothallidinae
- Genus: Porroglossum; Schltr.

Synonyms
- Lothiania Kraenzl.

= Porroglossum =

Genus of orchids

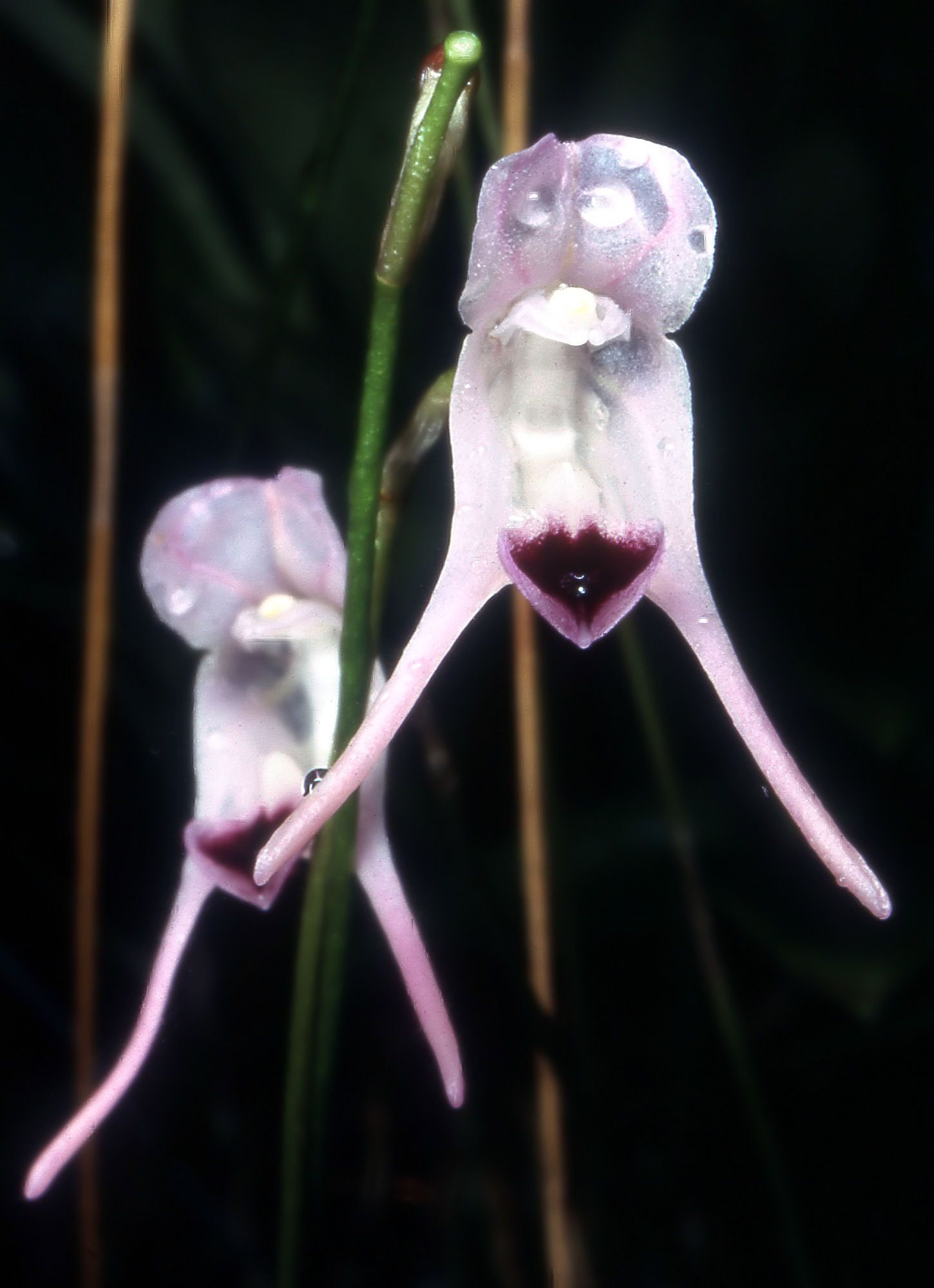

Porroglossum (from Greek "far off" and "tongue", referring to the position of the lip) is a genus of orchids native to the Andes of South America. The center of diversity lies in Ecuador, with many of the species endemic to that country, though others are found in Colombia, Venezuela, Peru, and Bolivia. This genus is abbreviated Prgm in horticultural trade.

The lip in this genus is unique in the family. It is hinged and has a mechanism that snaps shut when stimulated by a pollinator, thus trapping the insect to ensure that the pollinia will be removed and later transferred to the receptive surface. The lip opens after 30 minutes or so to release the insect, but also closes at night and reopens at dawn.

== Species ==
As of December 2025, Plants of the World Online accepts the following 56 species:

- Porroglossum acrobat Luer & Sijm
- Porroglossum actrix Luer & R.Escobar
- Porroglossum adrianae Luer & Sijm
- Porroglossum agile Luer
- Porroglossum amethystinum (Rchb.f.) Garay
- Porroglossum andreettae Luer
- Porroglossum apoloae Luer & Sijm
- Porroglossum aureum Luer
- Porroglossum condylosepalum H.R.Sweet
- Porroglossum dactylum Luer
- Porroglossum dalstroemii Luer
- Porroglossum dejonghei Luer & Sijm
- Porroglossum dreisei Luer & Andreetta
- Porroglossum echidna (Rchb.f.) Garay
- Porroglossum ecuagenerense Luer & Hirtz
- Porroglossum eduardi (Rchb.f.) H.R.Sweet
- Porroglossum gerritsenianum Luer & R.Parsons
- Porroglossum hirtzii Luer
- Porroglossum hoeijeri Luer
- Porroglossum hystrix Luer
- Porroglossum jesupiae Luer
- Porroglossum josei Luer
- Porroglossum leslie-garayi Szlach. & Kolan.
- Porroglossum lorenae Luer
- Porroglossum lycinum Luer
- Porroglossum marcojimeneziorum Baquero & Fierro-Minda
- Porroglossum marniae Luer
- Porroglossum medinae Kolan. & Szlach.
- Porroglossum meridionale P.Ortiz
- Porroglossum merinoi Pupulin & A.Doucette
- Porroglossum miguelangelii G.Merino, A.Doucette & Pupulin
- Porroglossum mordax (Rchb.f.) H.R.Sweet
- Porroglossum muscosum (Rchb.f.) Schltr.
- Porroglossum myosurotum Luer & Hirtz
- Porroglossum nutibara Luer & R.Escobar
- Porroglossum olivaceum H.R.Sweet
- Porroglossum oversteegenianum Luer & Sijm
- Porroglossum panguiensis J.McDaniel, J.Portilla & G.Merino
- Porroglossum parsonsii Luer
- Porroglossum peruvianum H.R.Sweet
- Porroglossum porphyreum G.Merino, A.Doucette & Pupulin
- Porroglossum portillae Luer & Andreetta
- Porroglossum procul Luer & R.Vásquez
- Porroglossum raoorum Baquero & Iturralde
- Porroglossum rodrigoi H.R.Sweet
- Porroglossum schramii Luer
- Porroglossum sergii P.Ortiz
- Porroglossum sijmii Luer
- Porroglossum sororcula Luer & Sijm
- Porroglossum taylorianum Luer
- Porroglossum teaguei Luer
- Porroglossum teretilabia Luer & Teague
- Porroglossum tokachii Luer
- Porroglossum tripollex Luer
- Porroglossum uxorium Luer
- Porroglossum zelenkoi Luer & Sijm
