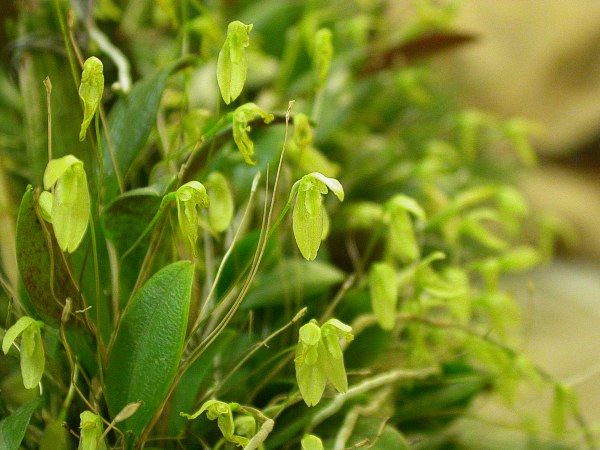
- Pleurothallopsis nemorosa

Scientific classification
- Kingdom: Plantae
- Clade: Tracheophytes
- Clade: Angiosperms
- Clade: Monocots
- Order: Asparagales
- Family: Orchidaceae
- Subfamily: Epidendroideae
- Tribe: Epidendreae
- Subtribe: Pleurothallidinae
- Genus: Pleurothallopsis; Porto & Brade

Type species
- Pleurothallopsis nemorosa (Barb.Rodr.) Porto & Brade

Species
- See text

Synonyms
- Restrepiopsis Luer

= Pleurothallopsis =

Genus of orchids

Pleurothallopsis is a genus of flowering plants in the family Orchidaceae. It is native to western South America and southern Central America.

== Species list ==
Species in the genus include:

- Pleurothallopsis alphonsiana L.M.Matthews
- Pleurothallopsis carnosa (Luer & R.Vásquez) Pridgeon & M.W.Chase
- Pleurothallopsis clausa (Luer & R.Escobar) Pridgeon & M.W.Chase
- Pleurothallopsis grandiflora (Garay) J.Ponert
- Pleurothallopsis inaequalis (Luer & R.Escobar) Pridgeon & M.W.Chase
- Pleurothallopsis insons (Luer & R.Escobar) Pridgeon & M.W.Chase
- Pleurothallopsis lehmannii (Luer) Pridgeon & M.W.Chase
- Pleurothallopsis microptera (Schltr.) Pridgeon & M.W.Chase
- Pleurothallopsis monetalis (Luer) Pridgeon & M.W.Chase
- Pleurothallopsis mulderae (Luer) Pridgeon & M.W.Chase
- Pleurothallopsis nemorosa (Barb.Rodr.) Porto & Brade
- Pleurothallopsis niesseniae (Luer) Luer
- Pleurothallopsis norae (Garay & Dunst.) Pridgeon & M.W.Chase
- Pleurothallopsis pandurata (Luer) Pridgeon & M.W.Chase
- Pleurothallopsis powersii (Luer) Pridgeon & M.W.Chase
- Pleurothallopsis reichenbachiana (Endrés ex Rchb.f.) Pridgeon & M.W.Chase
- Pleurothallopsis renziana Kolan., Rykacz. & Szlach.
- Pleurothallopsis rinkei Luer
- Pleurothallopsis striata (Luer & R.Escobar) Pridgeon & M.W.Chase
- Pleurothallopsis tubulosa (Lindl.) Pridgeon & M.W.Chase
- Pleurothallopsis ujarensis (Rchb.f.) Pridgeon & M.W.Chase
