= Phloeophila =

Scientific classification
- Kingdom: Plantae
- Clade: Tracheophytes
- Clade: Angiosperms
- Clade: Monocots
- Order: Asparagales
- Family: Orchidaceae
- Subfamily: Epidendroideae
- Subtribe: Pleurothallidinae
- Genus: Phloeophila; Hoehne & Schltr.

Genus of orchids

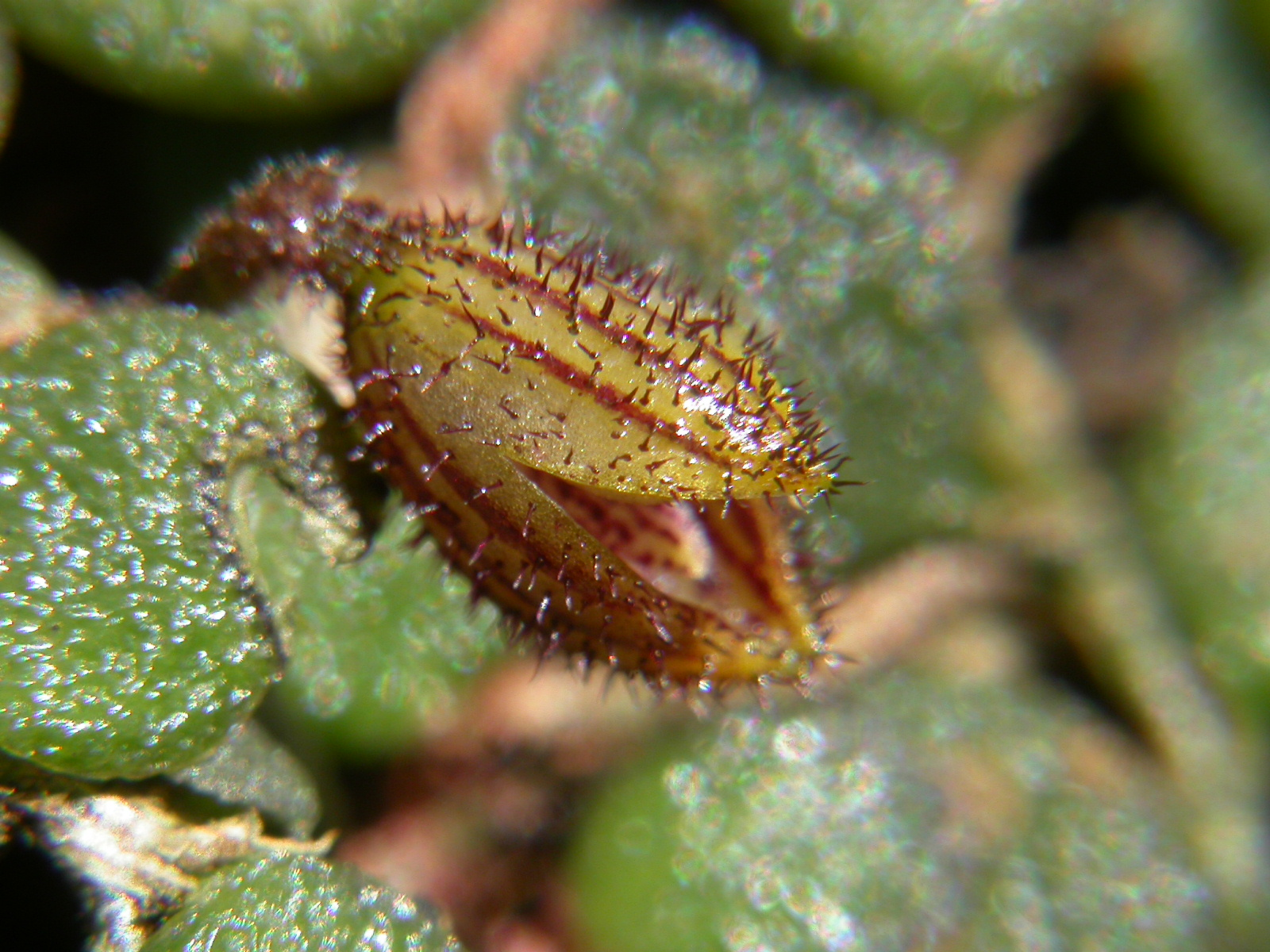
Phloeophila nummularia

Phloeophila is a genus of orchids belonging to the tribe Pleurothallidinae. While an initial molecular phylogeny in 2013 suggested that the type species of the genus (Phloeophila nummularia) was nested within Pabstiella, further sampling showed that it in fact belongs to a unique clade distant from Pabstiella, forming the current basis of the genus.

== Species ==
Species accepted by the Plants of the World Online as of August 2023:

- Phloeophila condorana M.M.Jiménez & Vélez-Abarca
- Phloeophila magnifica Vierling
- Phloeophila nummularia (Rchb.f.) Garay
- Phloeophila pelecaniceps (Luer) Pridgeon & M.W.Chase
- Phloeophila peperomioides (Ames) Garay
- Phloeophila ursula (Luer & Hirtz) Luer
