= Echinosepala =

Scientific classification
- Kingdom: Plantae
- Clade: Tracheophytes
- Clade: Angiosperms
- Clade: Monocots
- Order: Asparagales
- Family: Orchidaceae
- Subfamily: Epidendroideae
- Tribe: Epidendreae
- Subtribe: Pleurothallidinae
- Genus: Echinosepala; Pridgeon & M.W.Chase (2002)

Type species
- Echinosepala aspasicensis (Rchb.f.) Pridgeon & M.W.Chase (2002)

Synonyms
- Echinella Pridgeon & M.W.Chase (2001), nom. illeg.

Genus of orchids

Echinosepala is a genus of orchids. The genus contains 17 species native to the tropical Americas, ranging from Nicaragua to Bolivia and northern Brazil, and to Belize and Jamaica.

The genus comprises the former subgenera Silenia and Satyria of genus Myoxanthus. There is little reason to resist this change, thus Echinosepala is widely accepted. The genus was formerly known as Echinella Pridgeon & M.W.Chase, but as this latter also refers to an algae genus, it has been changed to Echinosepala.

== Species ==
17 species are accepted.

1. Echinosepala alexandrae (Schltr.) Pupulin & Bogarín
2. Echinosepala arenicola (Carnevali & I.Ramírez) Carnevali & G.A.Romero
3. Echinosepala aspasicensis (Rchb.f.) Pridgeon & M.W.Chase
4. Echinosepala balaeniceps (Luer & Dressler) Pridgeon & M.W.Chase
5. Echinosepala biseta (Luer) Pupulin
6. Echinosepala expolita Pupulin & Belfort
7. Echinosepala glenioides Pupulin
8. Echinosepala isthmica Pupulin
9. Echinosepala lappiformis (A.H.Heller & L.O.Williams) Pridgeon & M.W.Chase
10. Echinosepala longipedunculata Pupulin & Karremans
11. Echinosepala pastacensis (Luer) Pupulin
12. Echinosepala stonei (Luer) Pridgeon & M.W.Chase
13. Echinosepala tomentosa (Luer) Pridgeon & M.W.Chase
14. Echinosepala truncata Pupulin, L.Álvarez & Bogarín
15. Echinosepala uncinata (Fawc.) Pridgeon & M.W.Chase
16. Echinosepala vittata (Pupulin & M.A.Blanco) Luer
