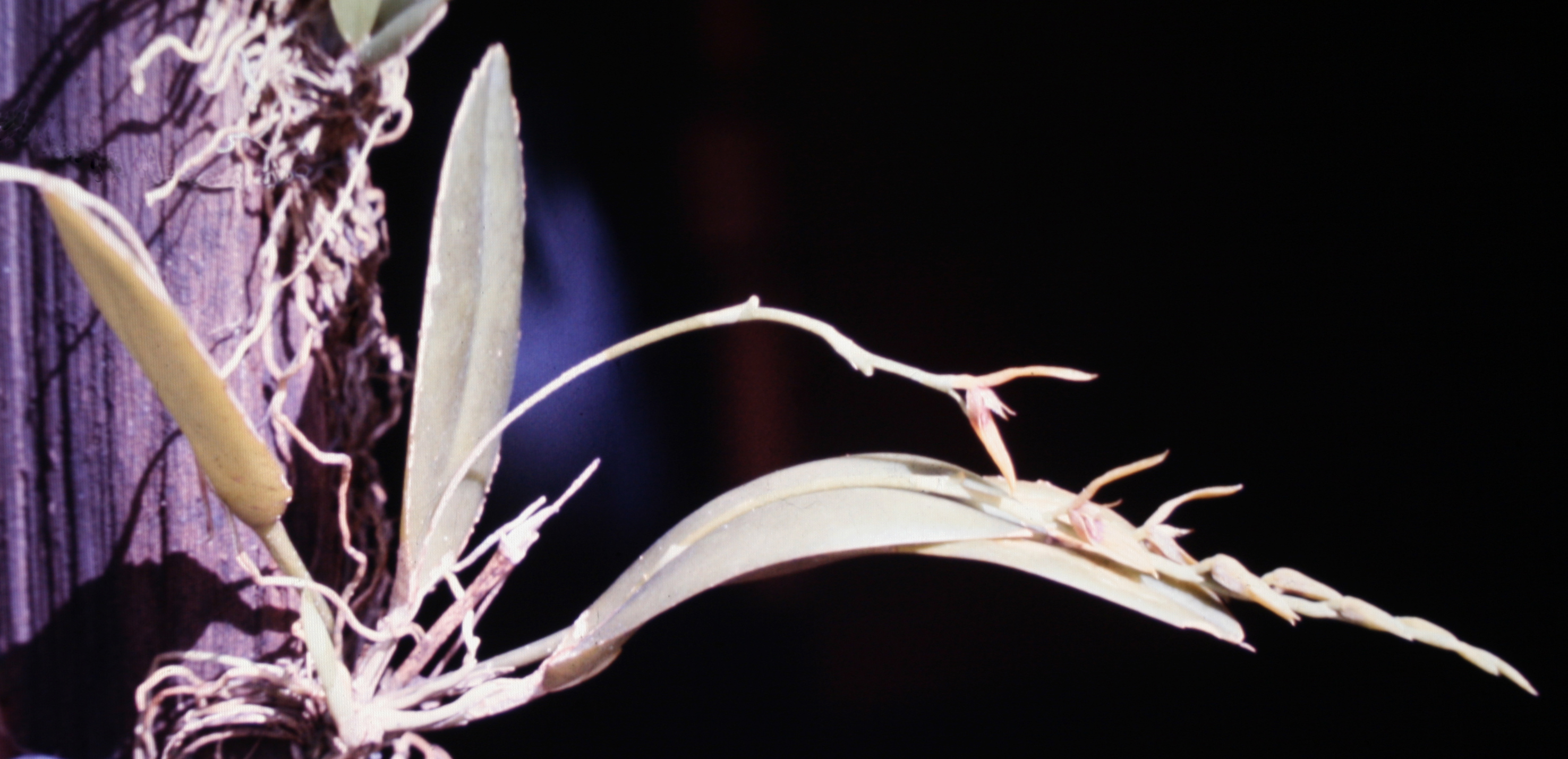
- Pleurothallis lanceana

Scientific classification
- Kingdom: Plantae
- Clade: Tracheophytes
- Clade: Angiosperms
- Clade: Monocots
- Order: Asparagales
- Family: Orchidaceae
- Subfamily: Epidendroideae
- Tribe: Epidendreae
- Subtribe: Pleurothallidinae; Lindl. ex G.Don

Genera
- See text
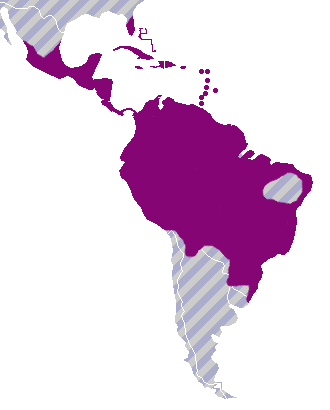

= Pleurothallidinae =

Subtribe of orchids

The Pleurothallidinae are a neotropical subtribe of plants of the orchid family (Orchidaceae) including 29 genera in more than 4000 species.

Naturally occurring species of this subtribe are among the more popular orchids of horticulturalists, especially the genera Dracula, Dryadella, Masdevallia and Restrepia.

The following genera are considered monophyletic : Barbosella (including Barbrodia), Dracula, Dresslerella, Dryadella, Lepanthes, Masdevallia, Platystele, Porroglossum, Restrepia, Scaphosepalum, Trisetella, and Zootrophion.

Many genera in the Pleurothallidinae were found polyphyletic, for example species attributed to the genus Pleurothallis are scattered across five clades.

== Genera ==
Genera recognized in Chase et al.'s 2015 classification of orchids:

Acianthera – Anathallis – Andinia – Barbosella – Brachionidium – Chamelophyton – Dilomilis – Diodonopsis – Draconanthes – Dracula – Dresslerella – Dryadella – Echinosepala – Frondaria – Kraenzlinella – Lepanthes – Lepanthopsis – Madisonia (as Sansonia) – Masdevallia – Myoxanthus – Neocogniauxia – Octomeria – Pabstiella – Phloeophila – Platystele – Pleurothallis – Pleurothallopsis – Porroglossum – Restrepia – Restrepiella – Scaphosepalum – Specklinia (e.g. Specklinia grobyi) – Stelis – Teagueia – Tomzanonia – Trichosalpinx – Trisetella – Zootrophion

Chase et al. adopt a broad circumscriptions within the subtribe; other sources separate genera such as Ophidion and Stellamaris.
