= Carlyle A. Luer =

American botanist (1922–2019)

- Born: August 23, 1922; Alton, Illinois, U.S.
- Died: November 9, 2019 (aged 97); Sarasota, Florida, U.S.
- Education: Washington University in St. Louis
- Known for: Orchid taxonomy, particularly of the Pleurothallidinae
- Scientific career
- Fields: Botany
- Author abbrev. (botany): Luer

Carlyle August Luer (August 23, 1922 – November 9, 2019) was a surgeon, botanist, and author who studied Orchidaceae. His specialty interest was the Pleurothallidinae (Genus Pleurothallis) and allied species.

Born to Carl & Vera Luer, he was raised in Alton, Illinois and later attended Washington University in St. Louis School of Medicine, graduating in 1946. From there he went on to be a surgeon in Sarasota, Florida and upon retirement in 1975 took up the study and botanical illustration of orchids.

He aided in the foundation of the Marie Selby Botanical Gardens and was the first editor of their research journal Selbyana. He was a senior curator at the Missouri Botanical Garden and published numerous articles and two books related to orchid taxonomy. Luer died at the age of 97 on November 9, 2019.

He and his wife had five children.

== Writings ==
- The Native Orchids of Florida
- The Native Orchids of the United States and Canada

== See also ==
- Calaway H. Dodson
