= P. grandis =

P. grandis may refer to:

- Pachycereus grandis, a large cactus species in the genus Pachycereus native to Mexico and just into southern Arizona, United States
- Peromyscus grandis, the big deer mouse, a rodent species found only in Guatemala
- Phasia grandis, a fly species in the genus Phasia
- Pinanga grandis, a flowering plant species in the genus Pinanga
- Pisonia grandis, a flowering tree species distributed throughout the coral cays of the Indian and Pacific Oceans
- Pleurobranchus grandis, a marine sidegill slug species
- Ploceus grandis, the giant weaver, a bird species endemic to São Tomé and Príncipe
- Promynoglenes grandis, a spider species in the genus Promynoglenes endemic to New Zealand

== Synonyms ==
- Paphinia grandis, a synonym for Paphinia grandiflora, an orchid species native to Brazil
- Pritchardia grandis, a synonym for Licuala grandis, a palm species

== See also ==
- Grandis (disambiguation)
