= Paphinia posadarum =

Scientific classification
- Kingdom: Plantae
- Clade: Tracheophytes
- Clade: Angiosperms
- Clade: Monocots
- Order: Asparagales
- Family: Orchidaceae
- Subfamily: Epidendroideae
- Genus: Paphinia
- Species: P. posadarum

Binomial name
- Paphinia posadarum Dodson & R.Escobar

Species of orchid

Paphinia posadarum is a species of orchid found from Colombia to Ecuador.

== Taxonomy ==
The classification of this orchid species was published Calaway H. Dodson & Rodrigo Escobar in Orquideologia; Revista de la Sociedad Colombiana de Orquideologia -Medellin, 18(3): 230 - 1993. Colombia. This species is found in Colombia & Ecuador.
