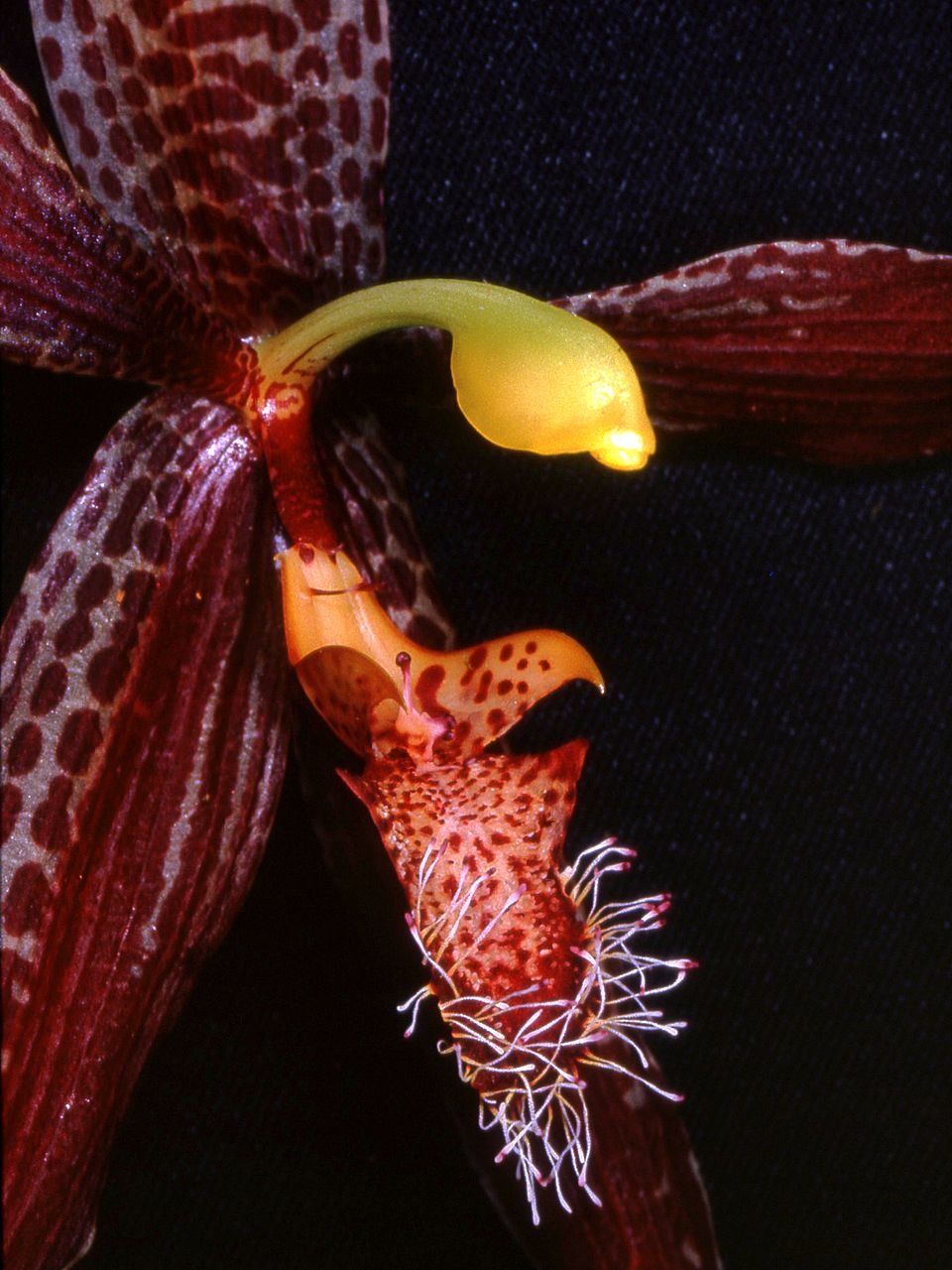

Scientific classification
- Kingdom: Plantae
- Clade: Tracheophytes
- Clade: Angiosperms
- Clade: Monocots
- Order: Asparagales
- Family: Orchidaceae
- Subfamily: Epidendroideae
- Genus: Paphinia
- Species: P. litensis

Binomial name
- Paphinia litensis Dodson & Neudecker

= Paphinia litensis =

Species of orchid

Paphinia litensis is a species of orchid endemic to Ecuador.

== Taxonomy ==
The classification of this orchid species was published by Calaway H. Dodson & Tilman Neudecker in Die Orchidee. Distribution ranges through the Esmeraldas (Ecuador, Western South America, Southern America). Originally collected by Calaway H. Dodson. The holotype is kept at Rio Palenque Science Center (RPSC), Ecuador.
