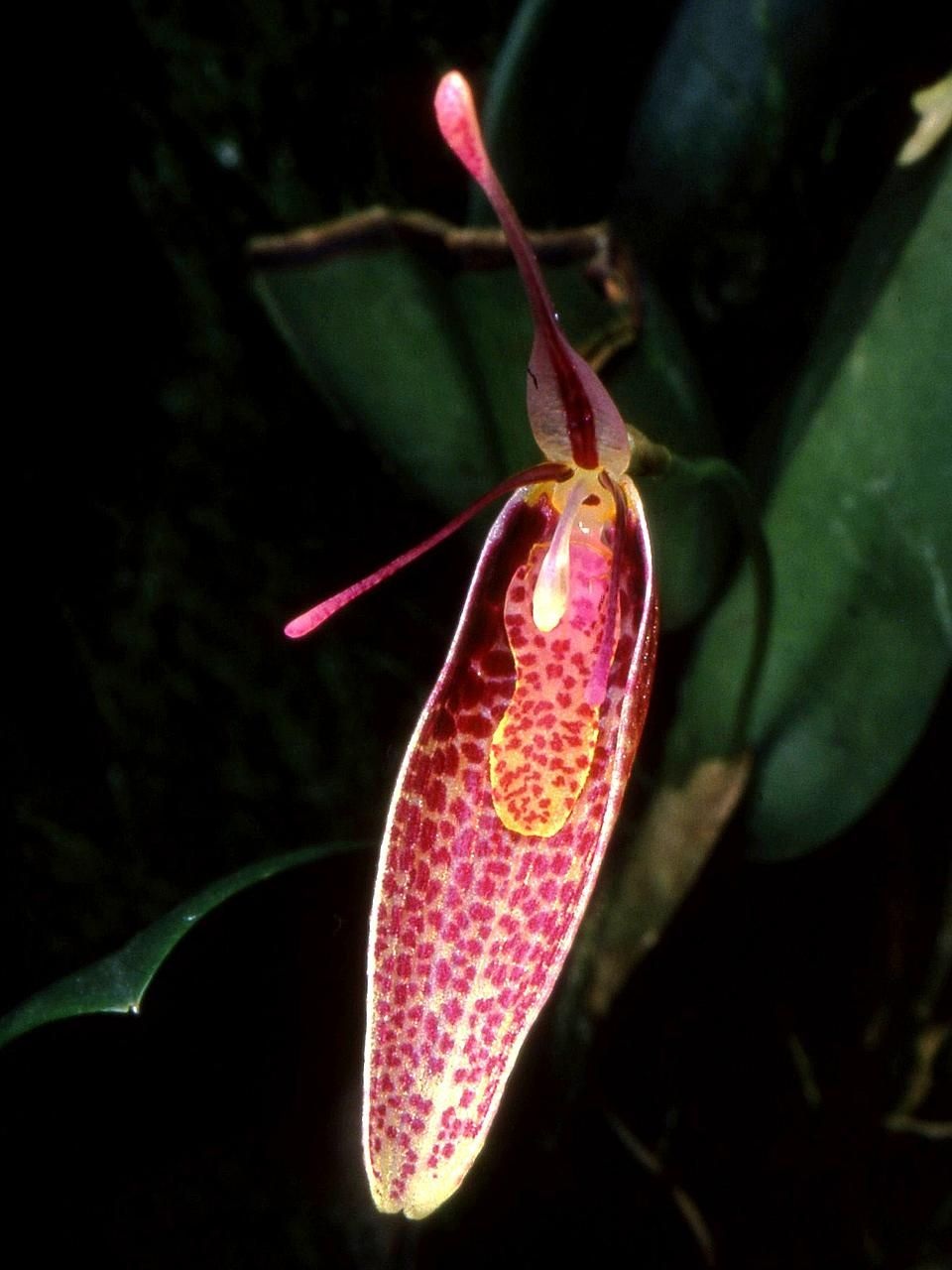
- Flower of Restrepia roseola

Conservation status
- CITES Appendix II

Scientific classification
- Kingdom: Plantae
- Clade: Tracheophytes
- Clade: Angiosperms
- Clade: Monocots
- Order: Asparagales
- Family: Orchidaceae
- Subfamily: Epidendroideae
- Genus: Restrepia
- Species: R. roseola

Binomial name
- Restrepia roseola Luer & R.Escobar

= Restrepia roseola =

Species of orchid

Restrepia roseola, the rosy restrepia, is a species of orchid endemic to Venezuela.

== Conservation ==
Restrepia roseola is listed in Appendix II of CITES. There are no suspensions or quotas in place for the species.
