= Restrepia seketii =

Conservation status
- CITES Appendix II

Scientific classification
- Kingdom: Plantae
- Clade: Tracheophytes
- Clade: Angiosperms
- Clade: Monocots
- Order: Asparagales
- Family: Orchidaceae
- Subfamily: Epidendroideae
- Genus: Restrepia
- Species: R. seketii

Binomial name
- Restrepia seketii Luer & R.Escobar

Species of flowering plant

Restrepia seketii is a species of flowering plant in the family Orchidaceae. It is an epiphyte.

The species is native to Colombia. It was described in 1996, and is listed in Appendix II of CITES.

== Taxonomy ==
Restrepia seketii was described by Carlyle A. Luer and Rodrigo Escobar in 1996. The holotype was collected from the Sierra Nevada de Santa Marta mountain range in 1980, by Robert Seket.

== Distribution ==
The species is native to the wet tropical biome of Colombia's Magdalena Department.

== Conservation ==
Restrepia seketii is listed in Appendix II of CITES. There are no suspensions or quotas in place for the species.
