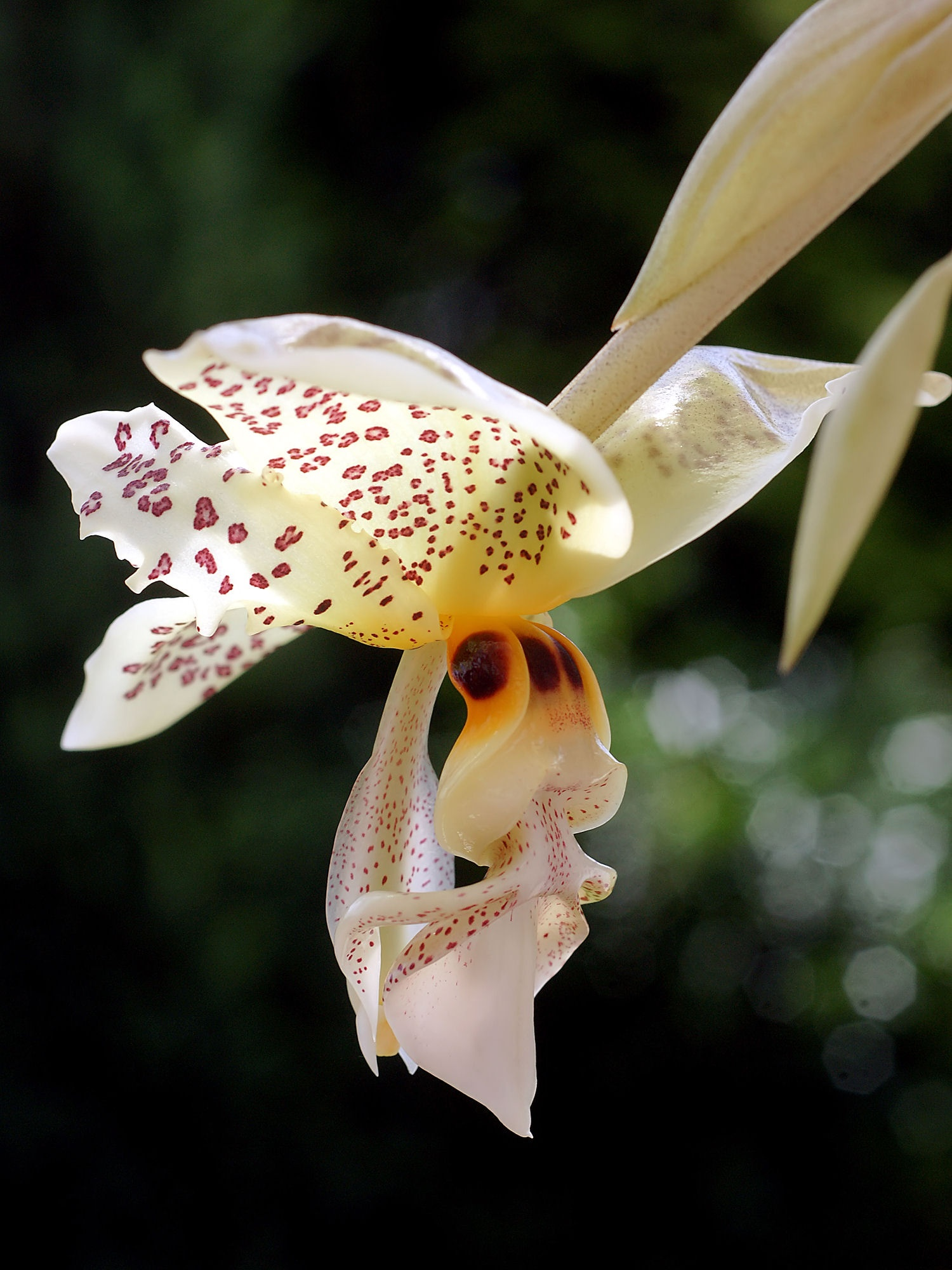
- Stanhopea gibbosa flower

Scientific classification
- Kingdom: Plantae
- Clade: Tracheophytes
- Clade: Angiosperms
- Clade: Monocots
- Order: Asparagales
- Family: Orchidaceae
- Subfamily: Epidendroideae
- Genus: Stanhopea
- Species: S. gibbosa

Binomial name
- Stanhopea gibbosa Rchb.f.

Synonyms
- Stanhopea impressa Rolfe; Stanhopea carchiensis Dodson

= Stanhopea gibbosa =

Species of orchid

Stanhopea gibbosa is a species of orchids from Colombia and West Ecuador. The name was often misapplied for a species from Costa Rica and Panama which was later described as Stanhopea confusa. Stanhopea carchiensis and Stanhopea impressa are synonyms of Stanhopea gibbosa.
