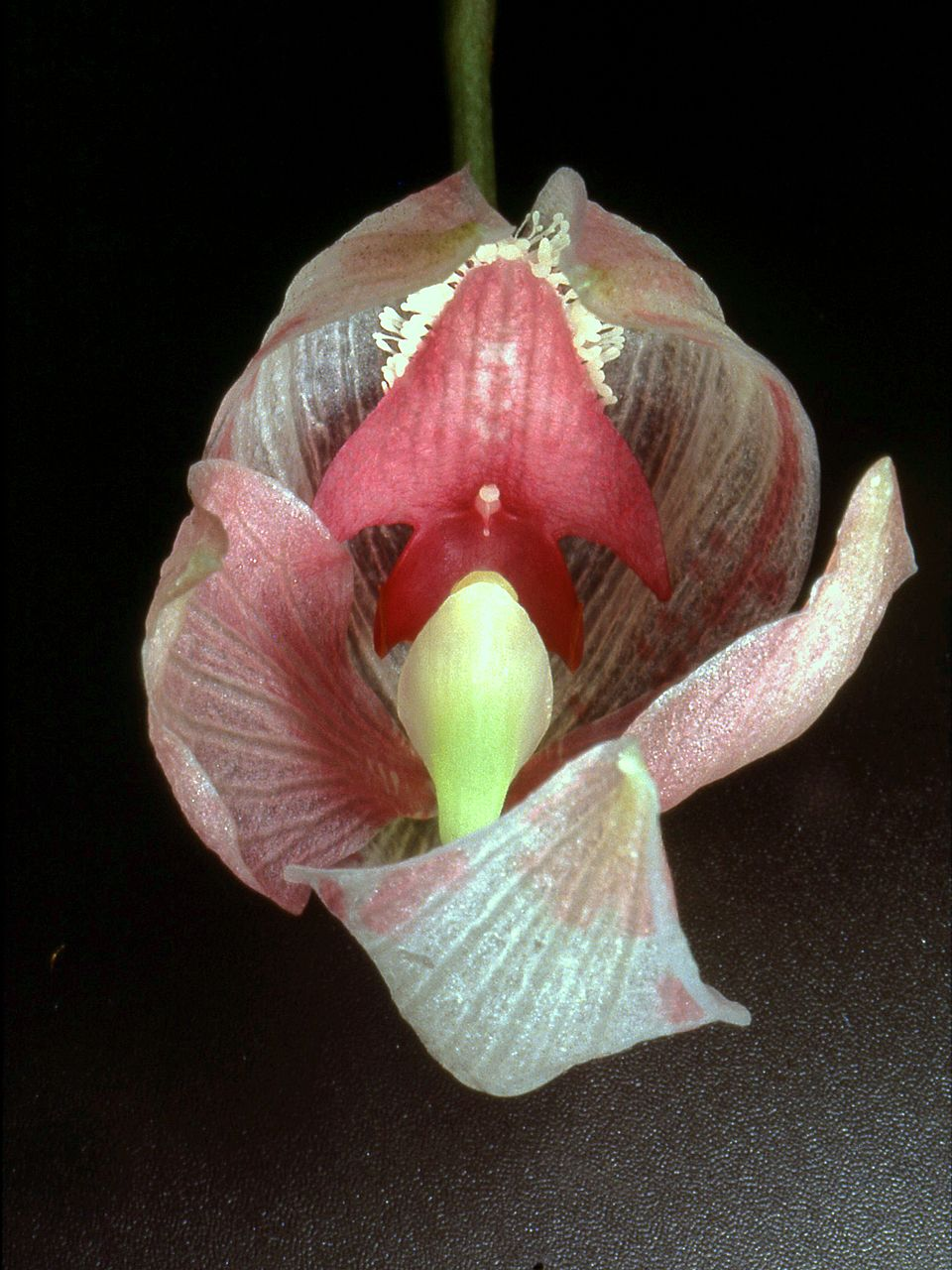

Scientific classification
- Kingdom: Plantae
- Clade: Tracheophytes
- Clade: Angiosperms
- Clade: Monocots
- Order: Asparagales
- Family: Orchidaceae
- Subfamily: Epidendroideae
- Genus: Paphinia
- Species: P. seegeri

Binomial name
- Paphinia seegeri G.Gerlach

= Paphinia seegeri =

Species of orchid

Paphinia seegeri is a species of orchid endemic to Colombia.

== Taxonomy ==
The classification of this orchid species was published by Dr. Günter Gerlach in Die Orchidee Dr. Gerlach is a noted expert on the genus Coryanthes.
