= Paphinia dunstervillei =

Scientific classification
- Kingdom: Plantae
- Clade: Tracheophytes
- Clade: Angiosperms
- Clade: Monocots
- Order: Asparagales
- Family: Orchidaceae
- Subfamily: Epidendroideae
- Genus: Paphinia
- Species: P. dunstervillei

Binomial name
- Paphinia dunstervillei Dodson & Neudecker

Species of orchid

Paphinia dunstervillei is an orchid species native to Venezuela.

== Taxonomy ==
The classification of this orchid species was published by Calaway H. Dodson & Tilman Neudecker with their description based on two drawings in 1991. The name was invalid until a specimen could be obtained for proper identification under article 9.1 of the International Code of Botanical Nomenclature. A holotype of the species was collected on 31 May 1993 in Venezuela by G.A. Romero, Keeper of the Oakes Ames Orchid Herbarium at Harvard University. The pressed specimen is now part of the collection at Gray Herbarium at Harvard University in Cambridge, Massachusetts - USA. Etymology: Named after G.C.K. Dunsterville, who first collected and illustrated the species. Distribution is known from two sites in the Atabapo-Siapo shrublands of Venezuela.

== Plant morphology ==
Planta affinis Paphiniae cristata (Lindl.), sed habitu terrestri, inflorescentia erecta et pilis binis in basi labelli diversa.

Description: Terrestrial herb. Rhizome short. Pseudobulbs appressed, laterally compressed, narrowly ovate, costate, to 2 cm wide and 8 cm long, 2 to 3 foliate, with 2 to 3 distichous, foliaceous sheaths surrounding the base. Leaves thin, heavily veined on the underside, narrowly ovate, acuminate, to 8 cm wide and 32 cm long. The inflorescence is produced from the base of the pseudobulb, erect, stout, surrounded by 2 to 4 sheaths, 3 to 5-flowered, to 22 cm long.

== Flower morphology ==
Description: Flowers nodding, resupinate. Pedicellate ovary terete, to 4 cm long. Sepals and petal dark wine red, spotted white toward the base, membranous; sepals lanceolate, acuminate, to 1.6 cm wide and 7 cm long; petals narrowly ovate, acuminate, to 1.4 cm wide and 6 cm long. Labellum 3-lobed, to 1.6 cm wide and 3 cm long, with a central plate-like callus between the lateral lobes, this callus with two-teeth-like backward and forward projections, the forward projection lightly bifid, a series of irregular, fleshy papillae between the plate-like callus and the base; lateral lobes, falcate, acute, the lateral margins thickened; midlobe trullate, the margins ciliate in the apical half, the upper and lower surface and the margins pailose, the apex rounded, slightly concave. Column green, yellow toward the apex, arcuate, clavate, winged.

Pollinarium with two narrowly obovate yellow pollinia, a narrow, slender, hialine stipe, .05 cm long, and a semicircular, yellow viscidium. Anther yellow.

== Bibliography ==
- Excerpt from the American Orchid Society Bulletin: 62. September 1993
