= Restrepia citrina =

Conservation status
- CITES Appendix II

Scientific classification
- Kingdom: Plantae
- Clade: Tracheophytes
- Clade: Angiosperms
- Clade: Monocots
- Order: Asparagales
- Family: Orchidaceae
- Subfamily: Epidendroideae
- Genus: Restrepia
- Species: R. citrina

Binomial name
- Restrepia citrina Luer & R.Escobar

Species of orchid

Restrepia citrina is a South American species of orchid native to Colombia. It typically grows in the wet tropical biome.

== Range ==
This rare epiphytic species is endemic to the cool, damp montane forests of the Eastern Cordillera of Colombia at altitudes of about 2,600 m.
