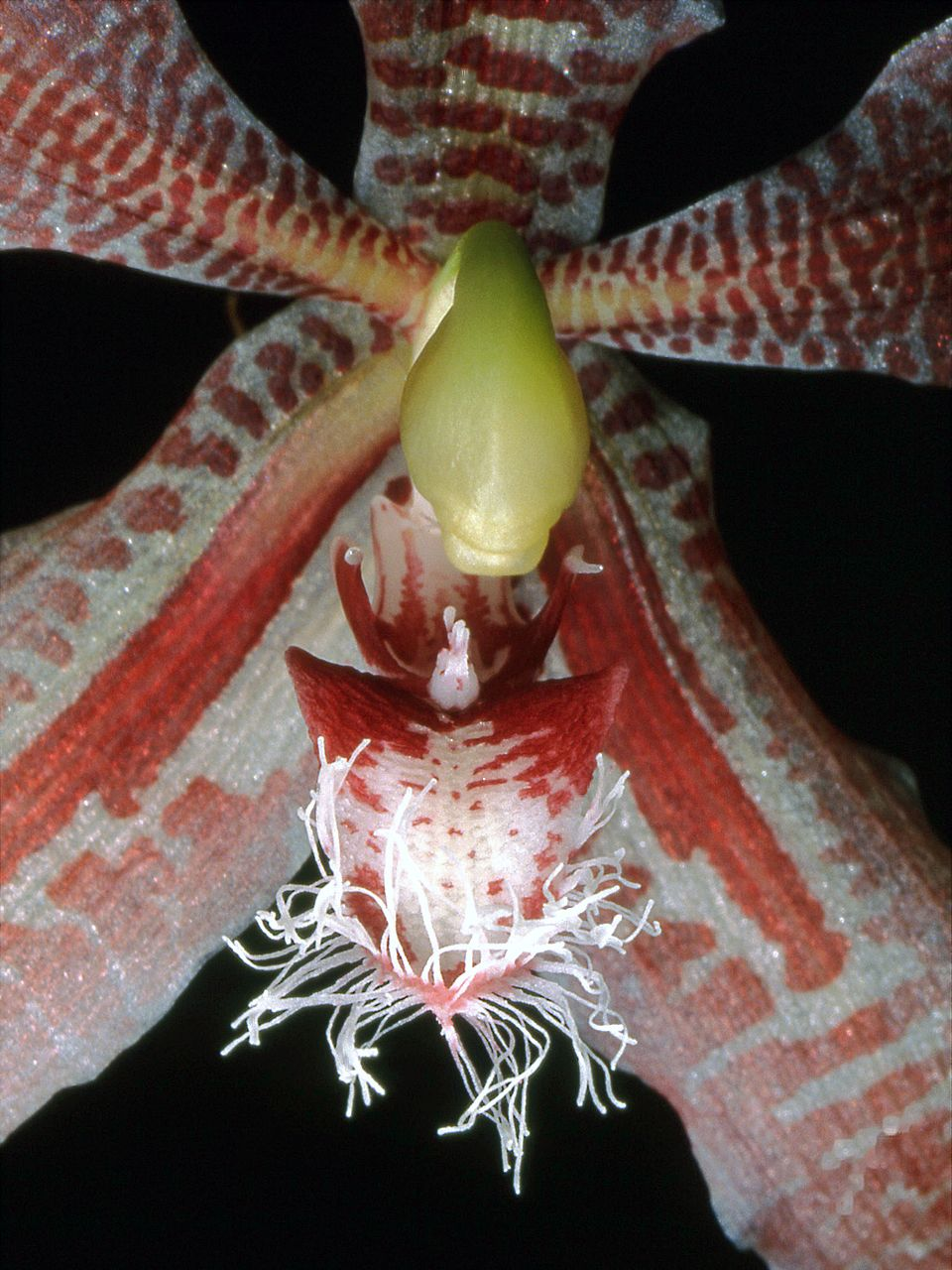

Scientific classification
- Kingdom: Plantae
- Clade: Tracheophytes
- Clade: Angiosperms
- Clade: Monocots
- Order: Asparagales
- Family: Orchidaceae
- Subfamily: Epidendroideae
- Genus: Paphinia
- Species: P. herrerae

Binomial name
- Paphinia herrerae Dodson

= Paphinia herrerae =

Species of orchid

Paphinia herrerae is a species of orchid endemic to southeastern Ecuador.

This orchid was collected near Zamora, Zamora-Chinchipe, Ecuador. The holotype is kept at Herbario Nacional del Ecuador (QCNE), and the isotype at Rio Palenque Science Center (RPSC). The formal description of the plant was made by Calaway H. Dodson in Icones Plantarum Tropicarum in 1989.

== Description ==
The orchid is an epiphyte with a short rhizome. It has compressed, oval pseudobulbs up to 8 cm long and 2 cm wide. The narrow, pointed oval leaves are thin and veiny. They measure up to 32 cm long by 8 cm wide. The inflorescence is a hanging array of 3 to 5 flowers.
