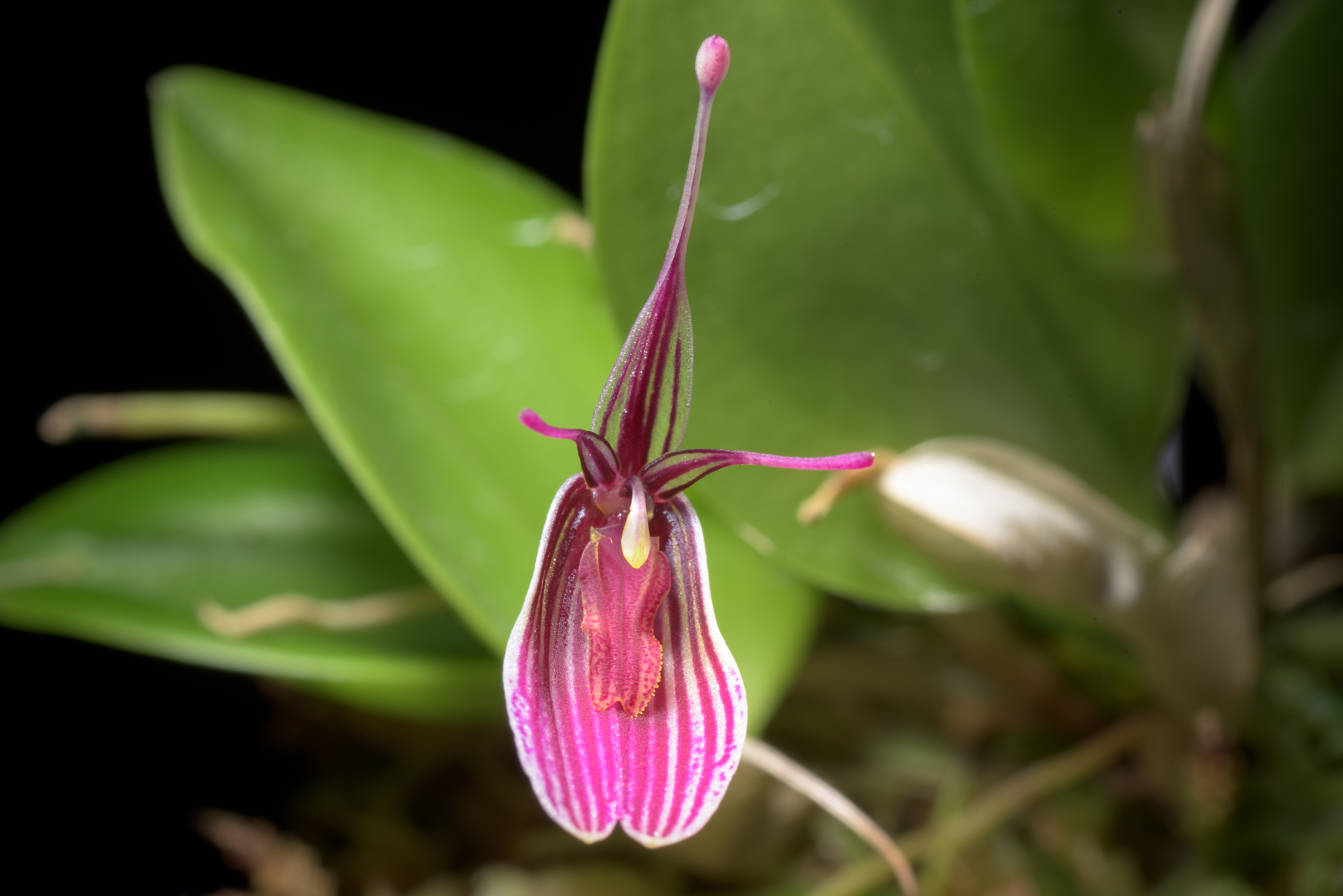

Conservation status
- CITES Appendix II

Scientific classification
- Kingdom: Plantae
- Clade: Tracheophytes
- Clade: Angiosperms
- Clade: Monocots
- Order: Asparagales
- Family: Orchidaceae
- Subfamily: Epidendroideae
- Genus: Restrepia
- Species: R. purpurea

Binomial name
- Restrepia purpurea Luer & R.Escobar

= Restrepia purpurea =

Species of flowering plant

Restrepia purpurea is a species of flowering plant in the family Orchidaceae. It is an epiphyte native to Colombia.

The species was described in 1996, and is listed in Appendix II of CITES.

== Taxonomy ==
Restrepia purpurea was described by Carlyle A. Luer and Rodrigo Escobar in 1996. The type material was collected in the Nariño Department of Colombia.

== Distribution ==
Restrepia purpurea is native to the wet tropical biome of Colombia's Nariño Department.

== Conservation ==
Restrepia purpurea is listed in Appendix II of CITES. There are no suspensions or quotas in place for the species.
