= Restrepia limbata =

Conservation status
- CITES Appendix II

Scientific classification
- Kingdom: Plantae
- Clade: Tracheophytes
- Clade: Angiosperms
- Clade: Monocots
- Order: Asparagales
- Family: Orchidaceae
- Subfamily: Epidendroideae
- Genus: Restrepia
- Species: R. limbata

Binomial name
- Restrepia limbata Luer & R.Escobar

Species of flowering plant

Restrepia limbata is a species of flowering plant in the family Orchidaceae. It is an epiphyte.

The species is native to Colombia, and was described in 1982.

== Distribution ==
Restrepia limbata is native to the wet tropical biome of Risaralda, Colombia.

== Taxonomy ==
The species was described by Carlyle A. Luer and Rodrigo Escobar in 1982.

== Conservation ==
Restrepia limbata is listed in Appendix II of CITES. There are no quotas or suspensions in place for the species.
