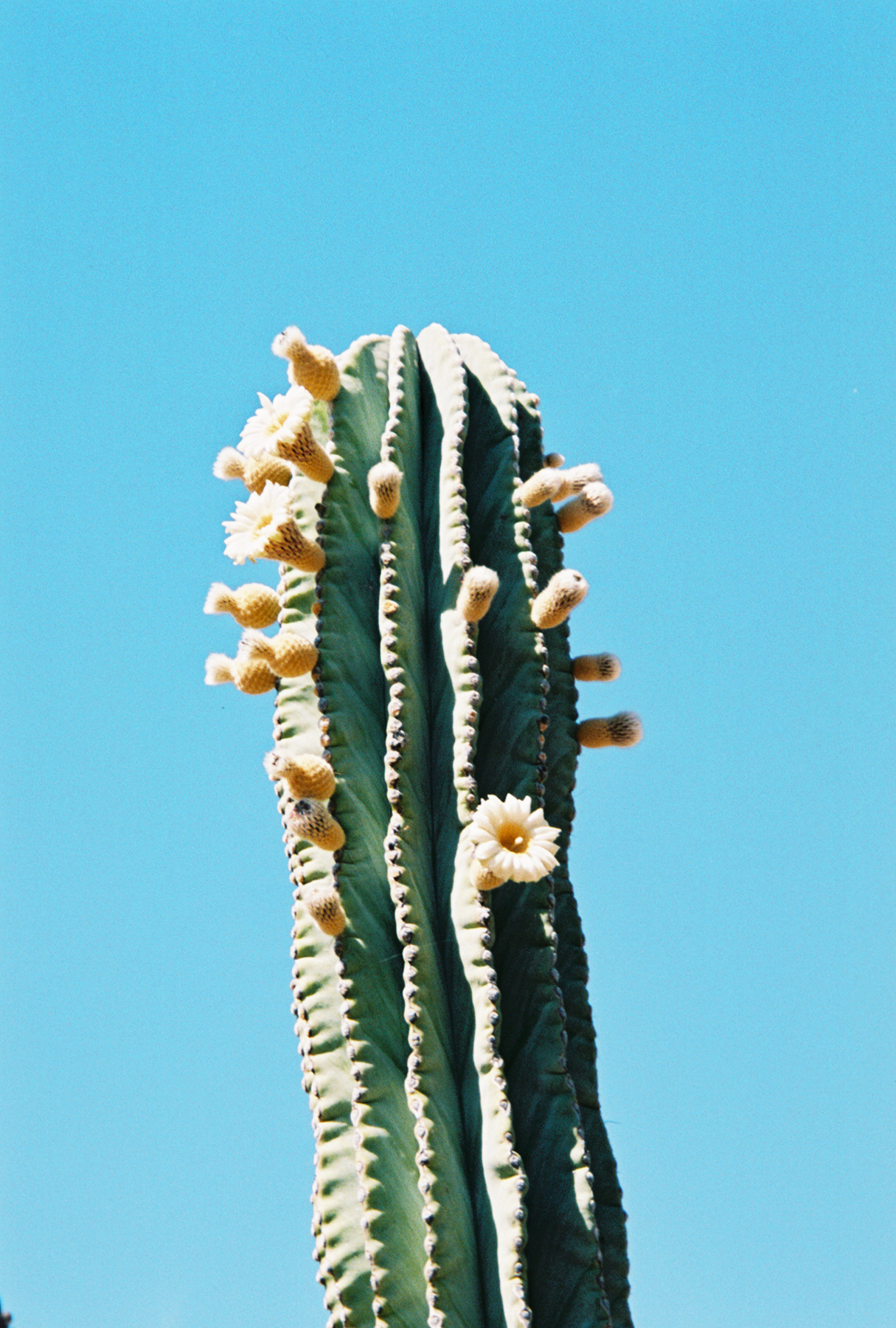
- Pachycereus pringlei in Baja California, Mexico

Scientific classification
- Kingdom: Plantae
- Clade: Tracheophytes
- Clade: Angiosperms
- Clade: Eudicots
- Order: Caryophyllales
- Family: Cactaceae
- Subfamily: Cactoideae
- Tribe: Echinocereeae
- Genus: Pachycereus (A.Berger) Britton & Rose

Type species
- Pachycereus pringlei

Species
- See text.

Synonyms
- Anisocereus Backeb.; Tribularia M.Ocampo

= Pachycereus =

Genus of plants

Pachycereus is a genus of large cacti native to Central America and Mexico. They form large shrubs or small trees up to 15 m (49 ft) tall, with stout stems up to 1 m (3 ft 3 in) in diameter. Pachycereus comes from the ancient Greek παχύς (pachys) meaning "thick" and the Latin cereus meaning "torch".

== Taxonomy ==
=== Species ===
As of February 2025, Plants of the World Online accepted six species:

Image	Scientific name	Common name	Distribution
	Pachycereus grandis Rose		Mexico (México State, Morelos, Oaxaca, Puebla)
	Pachycereus pecten-aboriginum (Engelm. ex S.Watson) Britton & Rose	Indian comb	Mexico
	Pachycereus pringlei (S.Watson) Britton & Rose	cardón cactus	states of Baja California, Baja California Sur, and Sonora Mexico
	Pachycereus tepamo Gama & S.Arias		Mexico (Michoacán)
	Pachycereus weberi (J.M.Coult.) Backeb.		Mexico (Guerrero, Oaxaca, Puebla)

P. pringlei is the tallest cactus species in the world, with a maximum recorded height of 19.2 m (63 ft).

=== Synonymy ===
These genera have been brought into synonymy with Pachycereus by some sources, although as of October 2023, not by Plants of the World Online:

- Lemaireocereus Britton & Rose
- Marginatocereus (Backeb.) Backeb.

Species that may be placed in Pachycereus include:

- Pachycereus hollianus (F.A.C.Weber ex J.M.Coult.) Buxb. = Lemaireocereus hollianus
- Pachycereus lepidanthus (Eichlam) Britton & Rose = Lemaireocereus lepidanthus
- Pachycereus militaris (Audot) D.R.Hunt = Mitrocereus militaris

== Psychoactive use ==
Some Pachycereus species, such as Pachycereus pecten-aboriginum and Pachycereus pringlei, have been reported to be used by indigenous peoples as entheogens and to produce hallucinogenic effects. It is notable that neither of these cacti have been reported to contain mescaline and instead other constituents may be responsible for their psychedelic effects.
