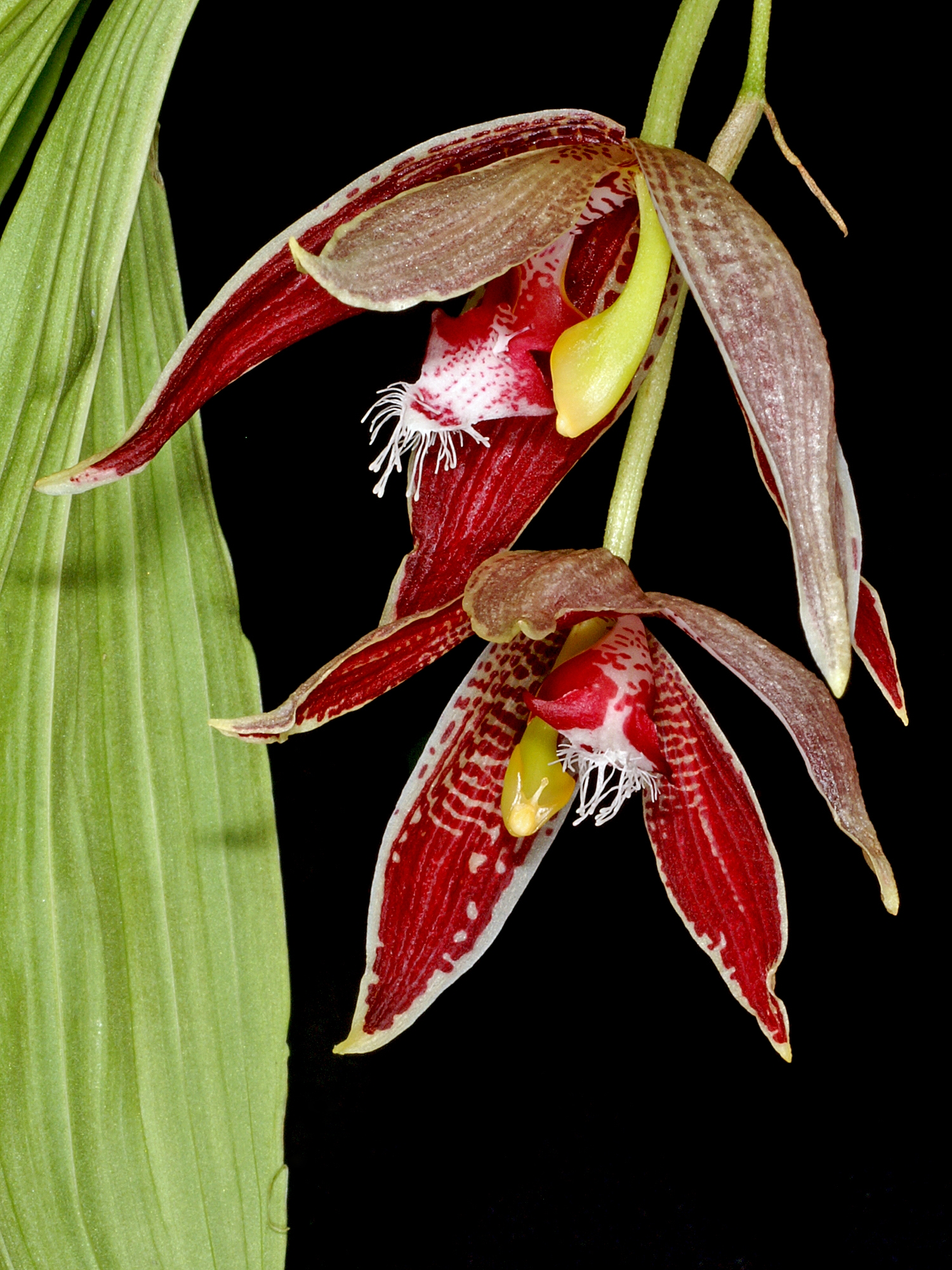

Scientific classification
- Kingdom: Plantae
- Clade: Tracheophytes
- Clade: Angiosperms
- Clade: Monocots
- Order: Asparagales
- Family: Orchidaceae
- Subfamily: Epidendroideae
- Genus: Paphinia
- Species: P. neudeckeri

Binomial name
- Paphinia neudeckeri Jenny

= Paphinia neudeckeri =

Species of orchid

Paphinia neudeckeri is a species of orchid found from Colombia to Ecuador.

== Taxonomy ==
The classification of this orchid species was published by Rudolf Jenny in Die Orchidee.
