= Paphinia hirtzii =

Scientific classification
- Kingdom: Plantae
- Clade: Tracheophytes
- Clade: Angiosperms
- Clade: Monocots
- Order: Asparagales
- Family: Orchidaceae
- Subfamily: Epidendroideae
- Genus: Paphinia
- Species: P. hirtzii

Binomial name
- Paphinia hirtzii Dodson

Species of orchid

Paphinia hirtzii is a species of orchid endemic to Ecuador.

== Taxonomy ==
The classification of this orchid species was published by Calaway H. Dodson in Icones Plantarum Tropicarum ser. 2, 6: t. 566. 1989 - Sarasota, Florida. Collected by C.H.Dodson & A.C.Hirtz 8 km from Chaco on the road to Santa Rosa de Chaco, off the road Ibarra to Lita, 1400 m, Esmeraldas (Ecuador, Western South America, Southern America). The holotype is kept at Herbario Nacional del Ecuador (QCNE). The isotype is kept at the Rio Palenque Science Center (RPSC), Ecuador.

== Plant morphology ==
Description: Epiphyte. Rhizome short. Pseudobulbs appressed, laterally compressed, narrowly ovate, costate, to 2 cm wide and 8 cm long, 2 to 30 foliate, with 2 to 3 distichous, foliaceous sheaths surrounding the base. Leaves thin, heavily veined on the underside, narrowly ovate, acuminate, to 8 cm wide and 32 cm long. The inflorescence is produced from the base of the pseudobulb, pendant, surrounded by 2 to 4 sheaths, 1 to 3-flowered.
