= Paphinia benzingii =

Scientific classification
- Kingdom: Plantae
- Clade: Tracheophytes
- Clade: Angiosperms
- Clade: Monocots
- Order: Asparagales
- Family: Orchidaceae
- Subfamily: Epidendroideae
- Genus: Paphinia
- Species: P. benzingii

Binomial name
- Paphinia benzingii Dodson & Neudecker

Species of orchid

Paphinia benzingii is a species of orchid endemic to Esmeraldas Province of Ecuador.

The classification of this species was published by Calaway H. Dodson & Tilman Neudecker in Die Orchidee. Hamburg-Othmarschen & Hamburg, 41: 233, figs. 190. Paphinia benzingii is distributed through the Esmeraldas (Ecuador, Western South America, Southern America). It was originally collected in Ecuador at an altitude of about 750m.
