= Paphinia subclausa =

Scientific classification
- Kingdom: Plantae
- Clade: Tracheophytes
- Clade: Angiosperms
- Clade: Monocots
- Order: Asparagales
- Family: Orchidaceae
- Subfamily: Epidendroideae
- Genus: Paphinia
- Species: P. subclausa

Binomial name
- Paphinia subclausa Dressler, 1997

Species of orchid

Paphinia subclausa is a species of orchid endemic to Costa Rica.

== Taxonomy ==
The classification of this orchid species was published by Robert Louis Dressler in Novon; a Journal for Botanical Nomenclature, 7: 121, fig. 1997 - St. Louis, MO, United States. The species was collected in Reserva Juan Castro Blanco by D.E.Mora-Retana, 900 m, Costa Rica (Central America, Southern America). The holotype is kept at the Universidad de San José.
