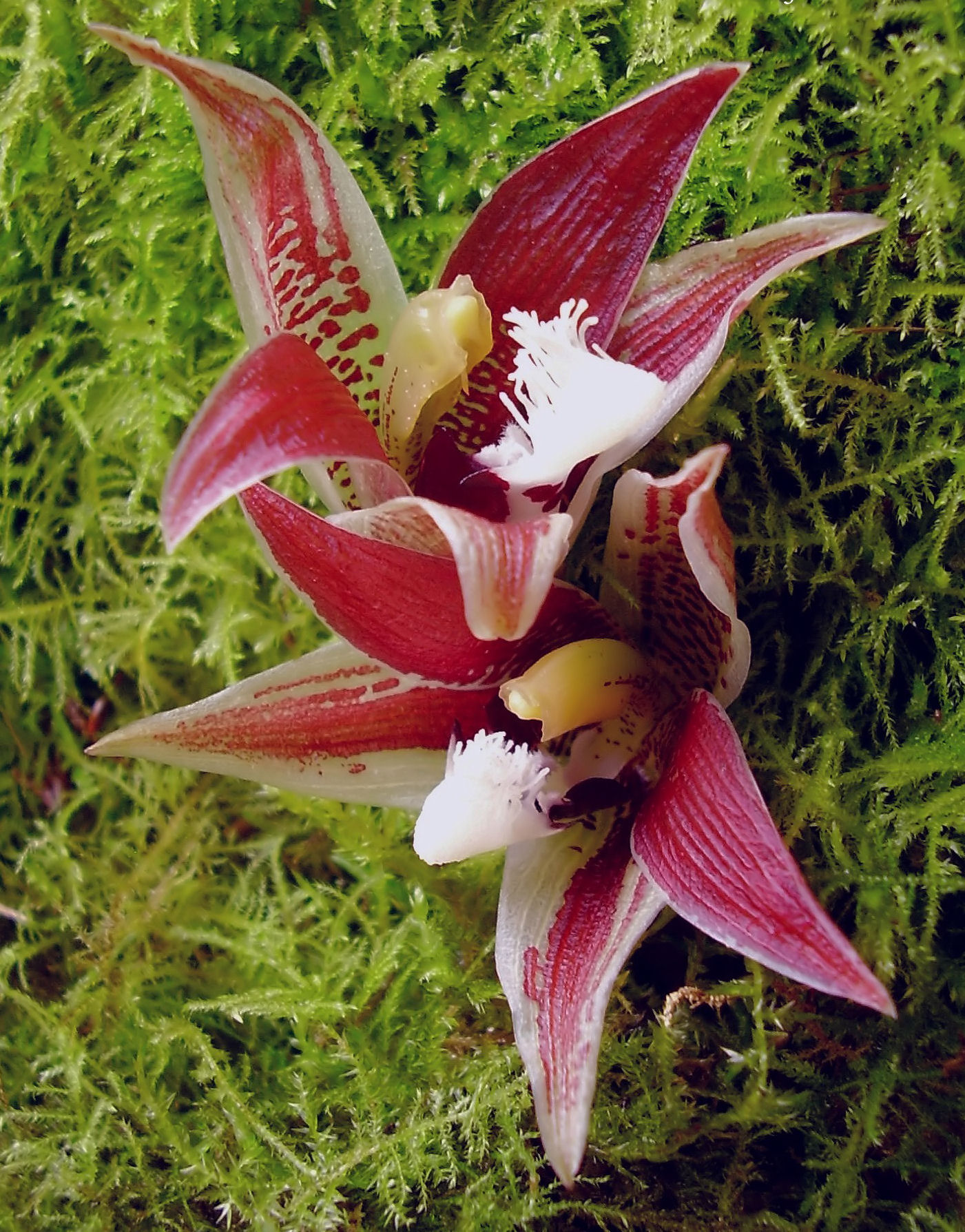

Scientific classification
- Kingdom: Plantae
- Clade: Tracheophytes
- Clade: Angiosperms
- Clade: Monocots
- Order: Asparagales
- Family: Orchidaceae
- Subfamily: Epidendroideae
- Genus: Paphinia
- Species: P. lindeniana

Binomial name
- Paphinia lindeniana Rchb.f.

Synonyms
- Lycaste lindeniana (Rchb.f.) G.Nicholson

= Paphinia lindeniana =

Species of orchid

Paphinia lindeniana is a species of orchid native to Colombia, Venezuela, Brazil, Peru and possibly Guyana.

== Taxonomy ==
The classification of this orchid species was published by Heinrich Gustav Reichenbach (1824–1889) in Lindenia; Iconographie des Orchidees. 3: 23, pl. 106. 1887 Flora, 70: 497. 1887 - Ghent & Brussels. Distribution: Venezuela (Northern South America, Southern America).

== Plant morphology ==
Original entry in Lindenia 3: t. 106 - 1887 Paphinia lindeniana Affinis Paphinia cristata (Lindl.), labello diversissimo, angulis hypochilii angusti antrorsis basi epichilii paulisper latiorbus, epichilio sessili utrinque semihastato triangulo retuso, callo parvo sub apice, callis filiformibus utrinque in margine densis, usque ante basin, disco callis papulosis crebis seubpedimenmedianae, ibi ampliata tabulari emarginata ob sinum medianum, superne ciliolata, columnae alis rotundatis. America aequatorialis.

Paphinia lindeniana is related to Paphinia cristata, very diverse labellum, angular hypochile, narrow

== Flower morphology ==
The flower has similar star-shaped red sepals and petals, a pale yellow curved column, and a white fringed labellum. The sepals often have red streaks and spots on a white background.
