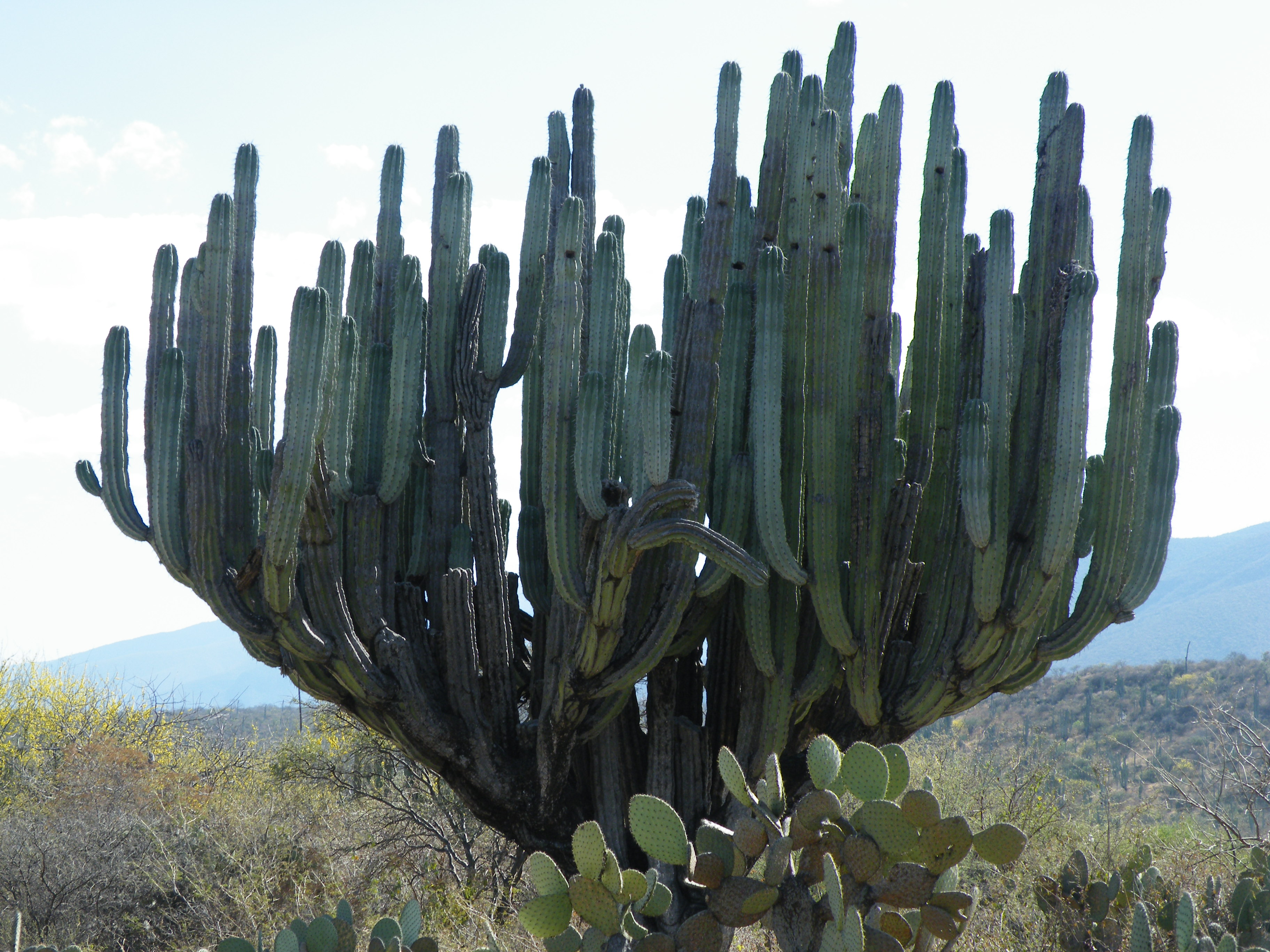

Conservation status
- Least Concern (IUCN 3.1)

Scientific classification
- Kingdom: Plantae
- Clade: Tracheophytes
- Clade: Angiosperms
- Clade: Eudicots
- Order: Caryophyllales
- Family: Cactaceae
- Subfamily: Cactoideae
- Genus: Pachycereus
- Species: P. weberi

Binomial name
- Pachycereus weberi (J.M.Coult.) Backeb.

Synonyms
- Cereus candelabrum K.Schum. 1897; Cereus weberi J.M.Coult. 1896; Lemaireocereus weberi (J.M.Coult.) Britton & Rose 1909; Ritterocereus weberi (J.M.Coult.) Backeb. 1951; Stenocereus weberi (J.M.Coult.) Buxb. 1961; Pachycereus gigas (Backeb.) Backeb. 1960; Pachycereus grandis var. gigas Backeb. 1941; Pachycereus weberi var. gigas (Backeb.) P.V.Heath 1992

= Pachycereus weberi =

Species of cactus

Pachycereus weberi is a columnar cactus plant native to Mexico.

== Description ==
Pachycereus weberi is a columnar cactus that grows strongly tree-like and can reach heights of up to 11 meters. The moderately upright growth habit is candelabra-shaped. However, this typical growth form is only achieved by the plant when it reaches a height of two meters, where numerous branches of the main trunk arise. The slightly waxy, bluish-green side shoots have a diameter of 12 to 20 centimeters and consist of eight to ten ribs, which are covered with white, felty areoles at a distance of 2 to 3 (up to 5) centimeters. The blackish, flattened central spine can be up to 10 centimeters long. It is accompanied by 6 to 12 reddish-brown marginal spines with a length of 2 to 3 centimeters.

The white to yellow flowers, which only open at night, are 8 to 10 centimeters long. The ovary is rounded and woolly. The flower tube is covered with scales and brown hairs. The edible fruits are 6 to 7 centimeters long and have fine yellowish thorns. The flesh is reddish-purple.

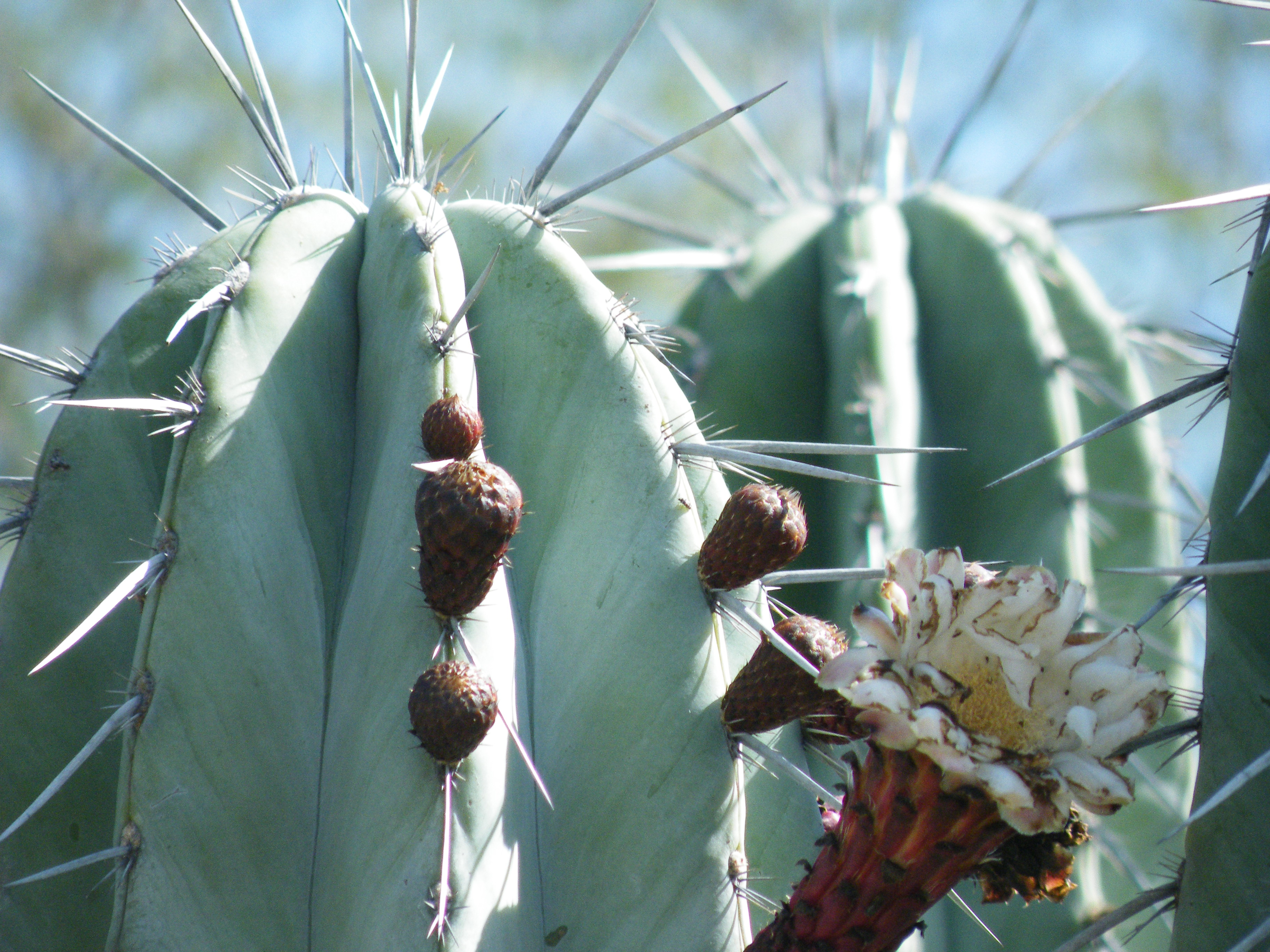
Flowers

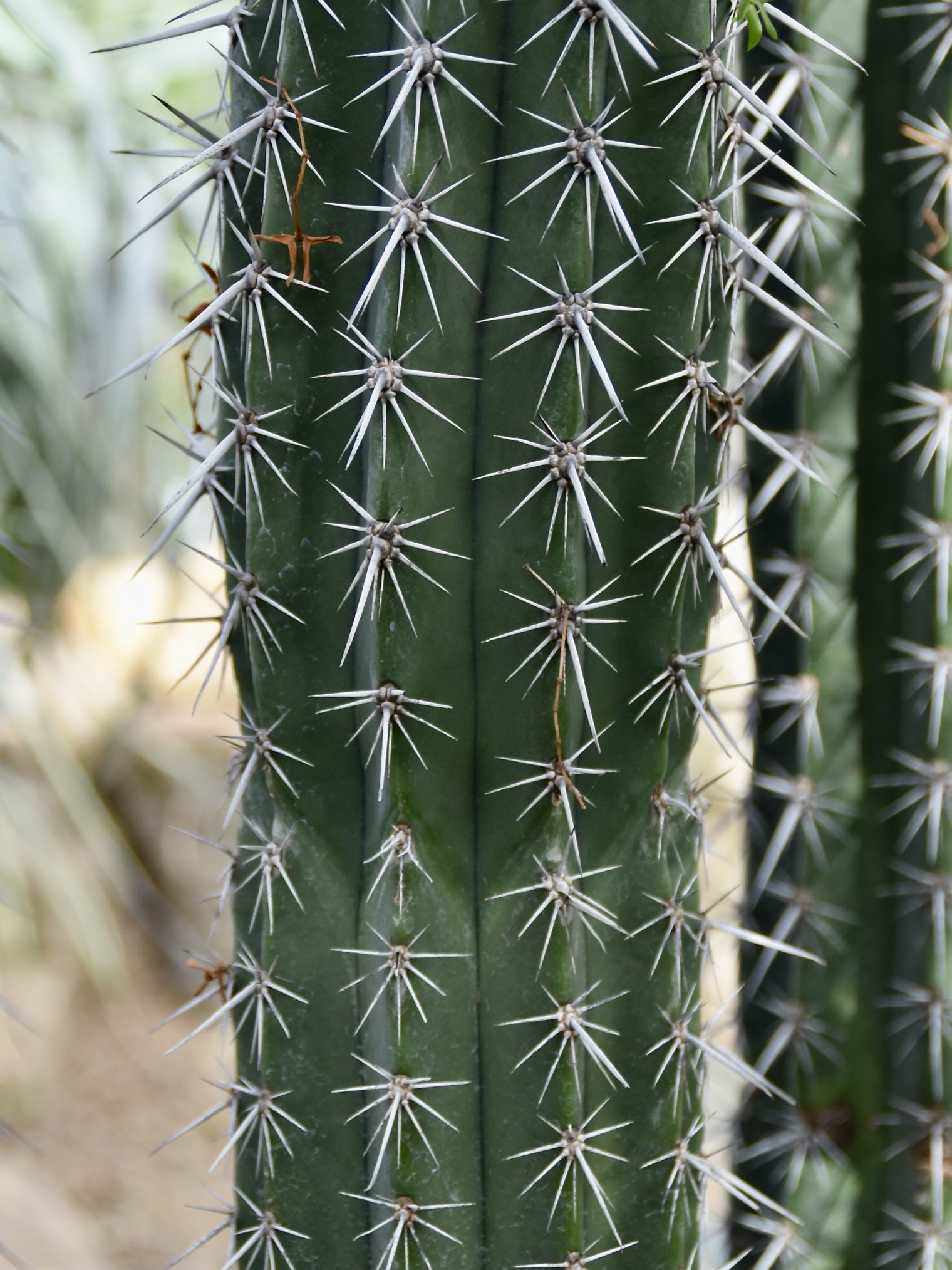
Spines

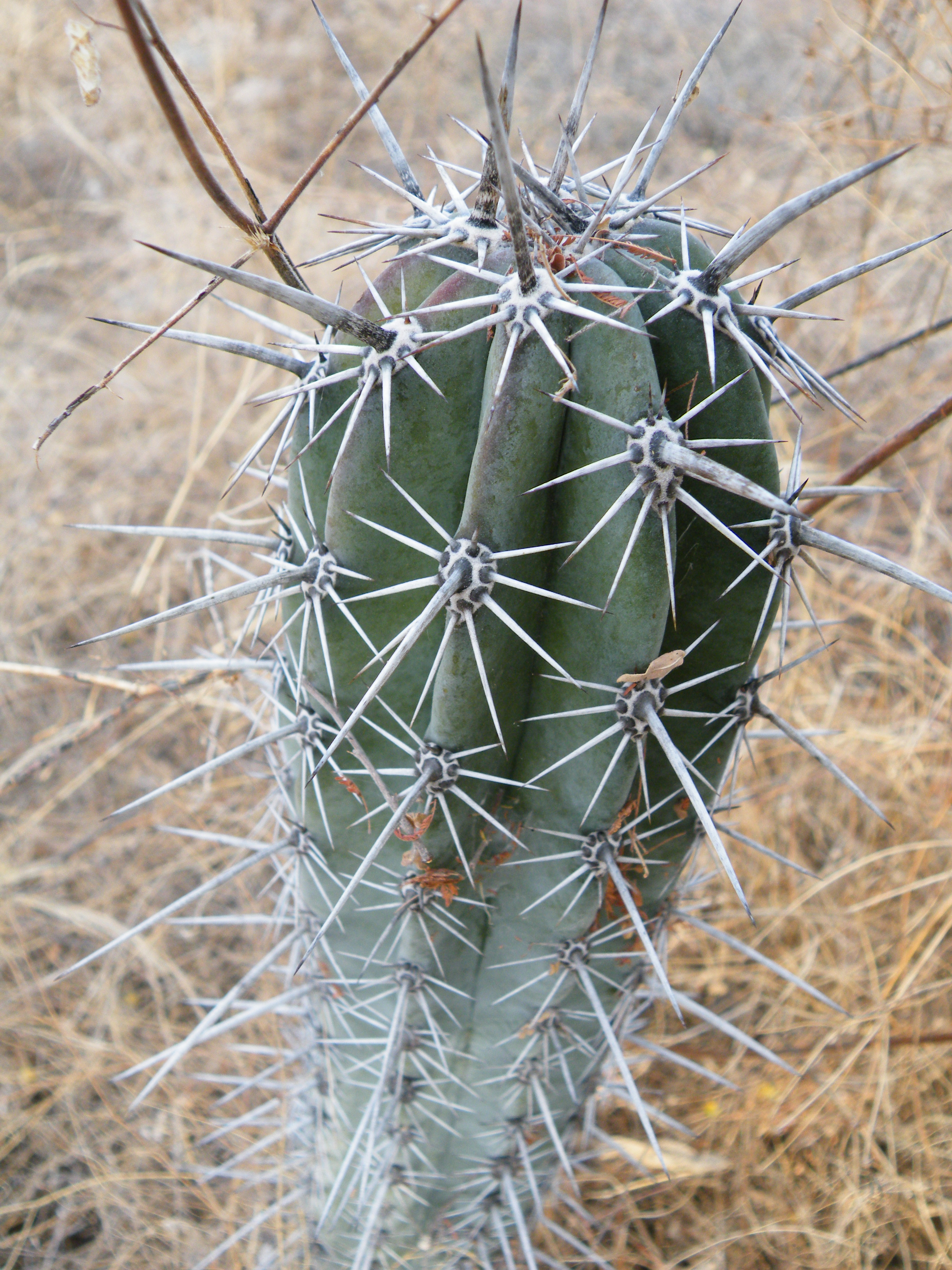
Tip of plant

== Distribution ==
Pachycereus weberi is widespread in the Mexican states of Puebla, Guerrero, Morelos, Chihuahua and Oaxaca at altitudes of 600 to 1,500 m.

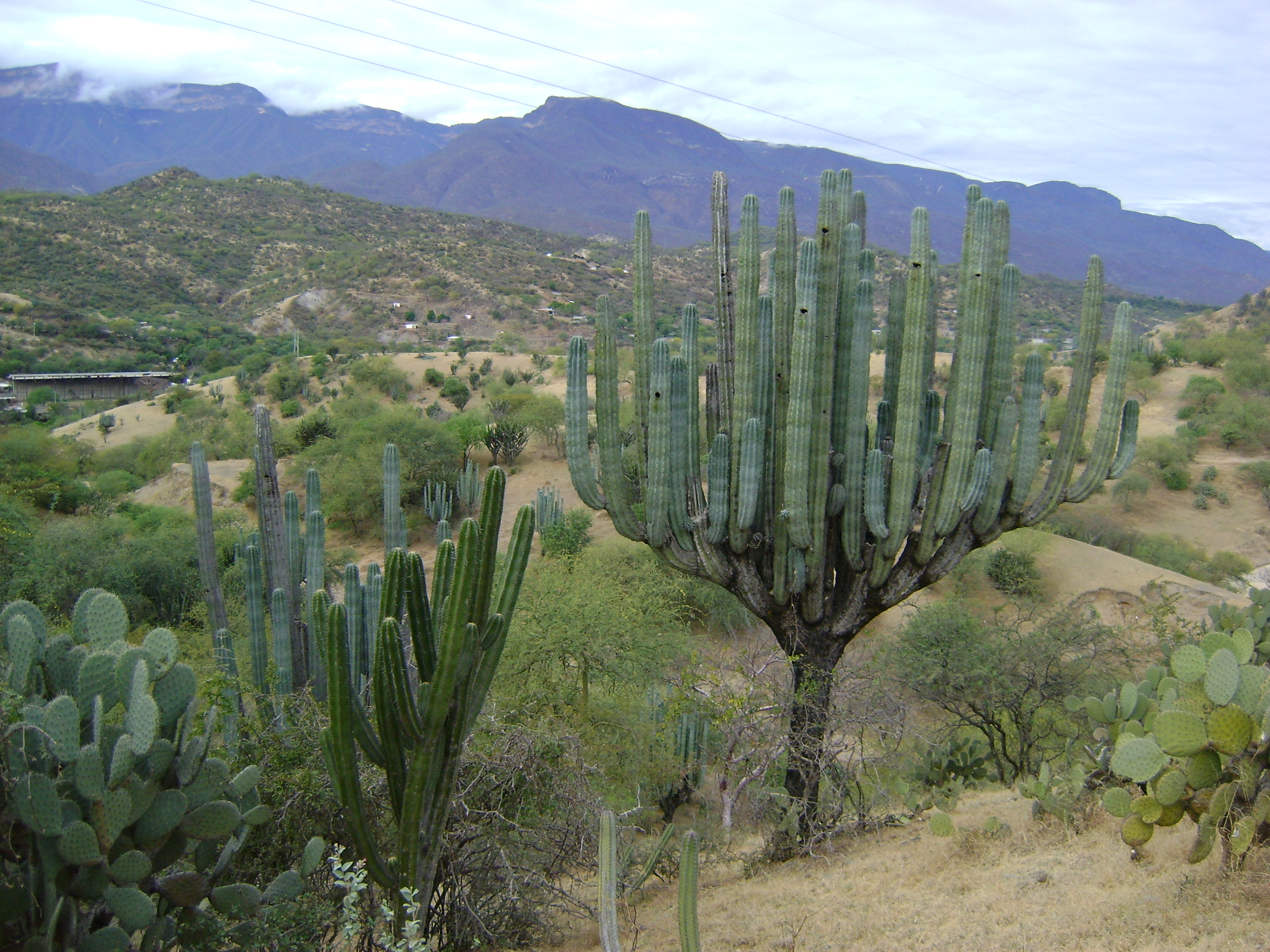
Plants growing in Tomellin, Oaxaca

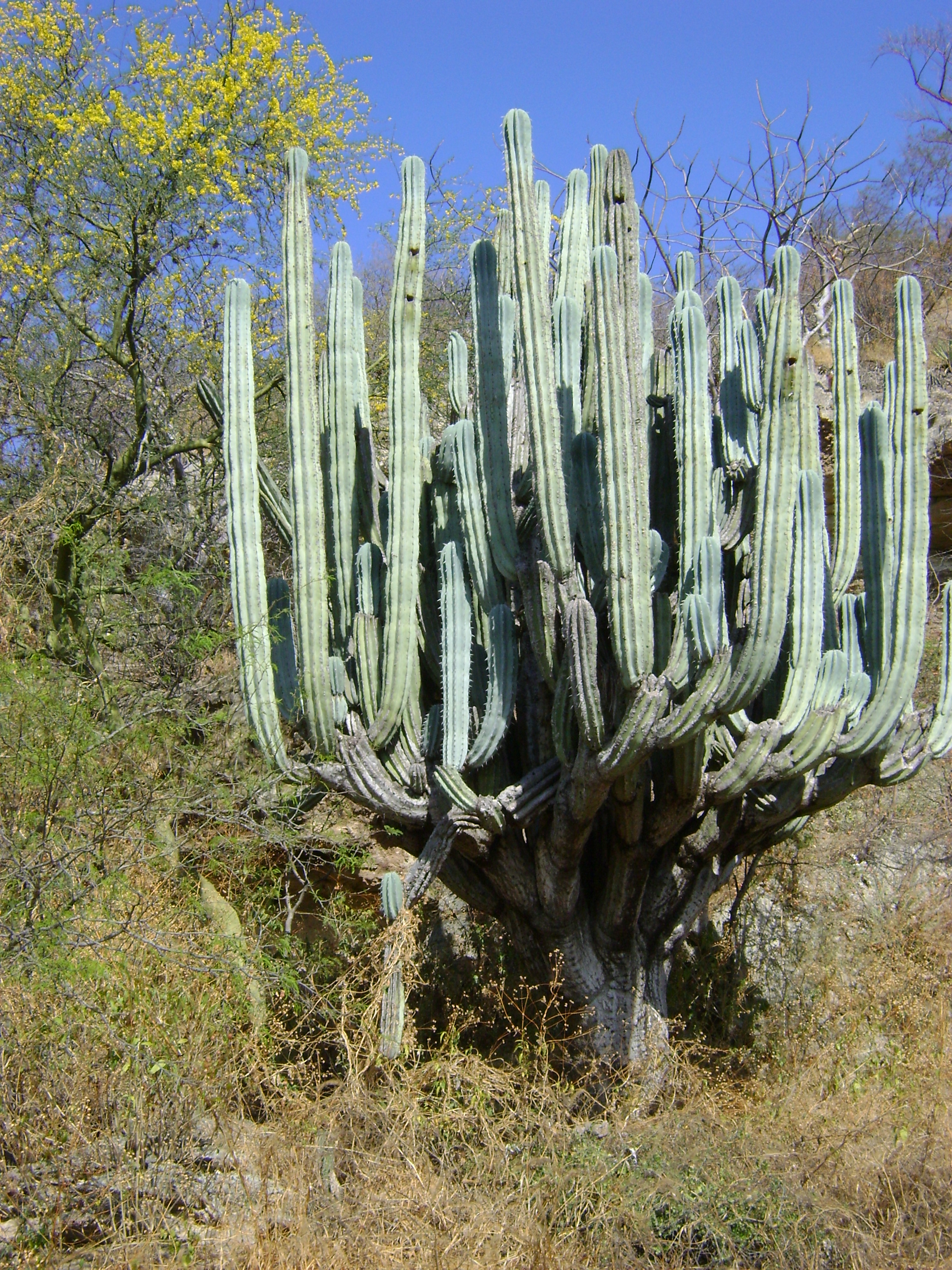
Plant growing in San Juan De Los Cues, Oaxaca

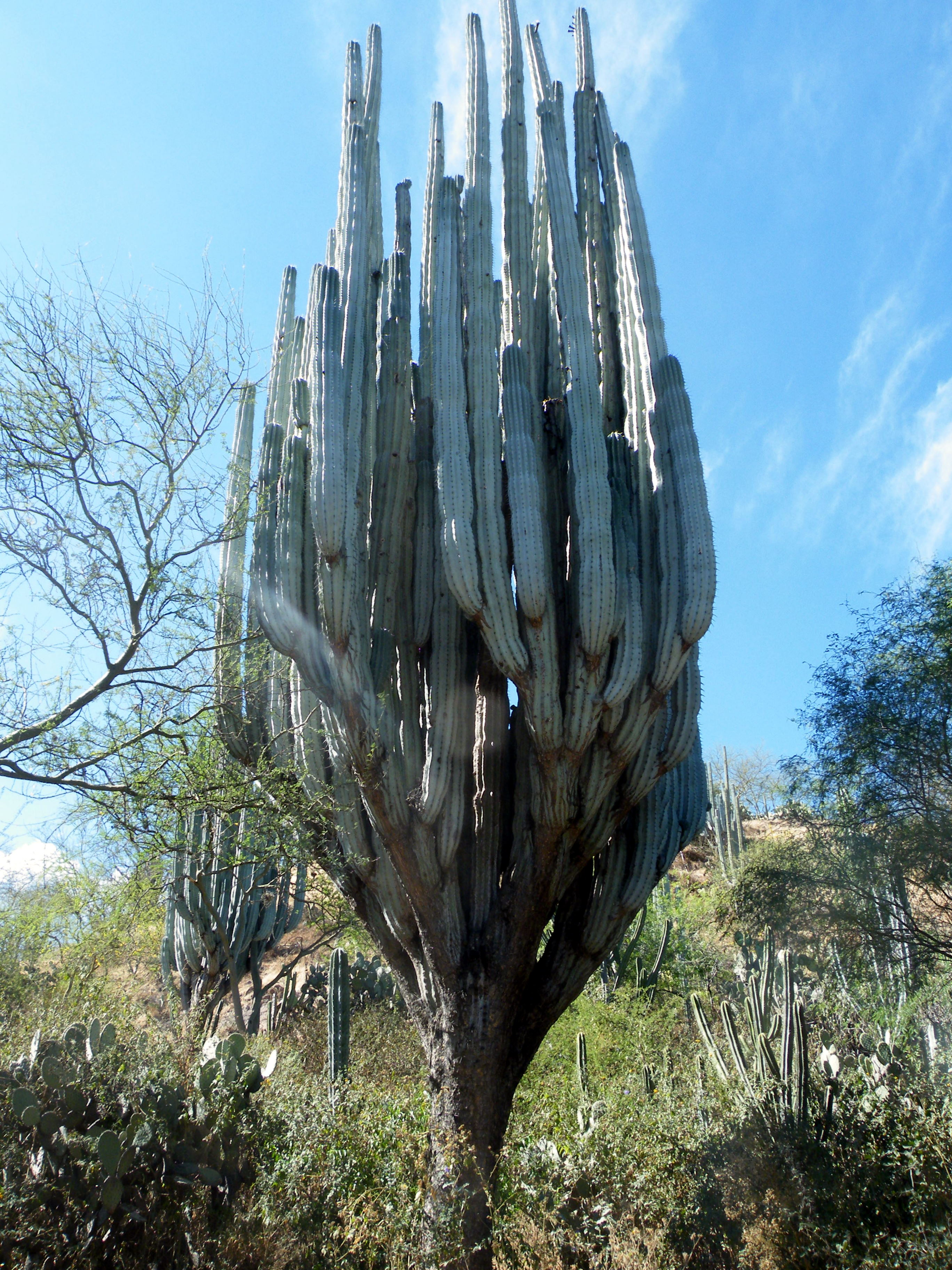
Large plant in Cuicatlan, Oaxaca

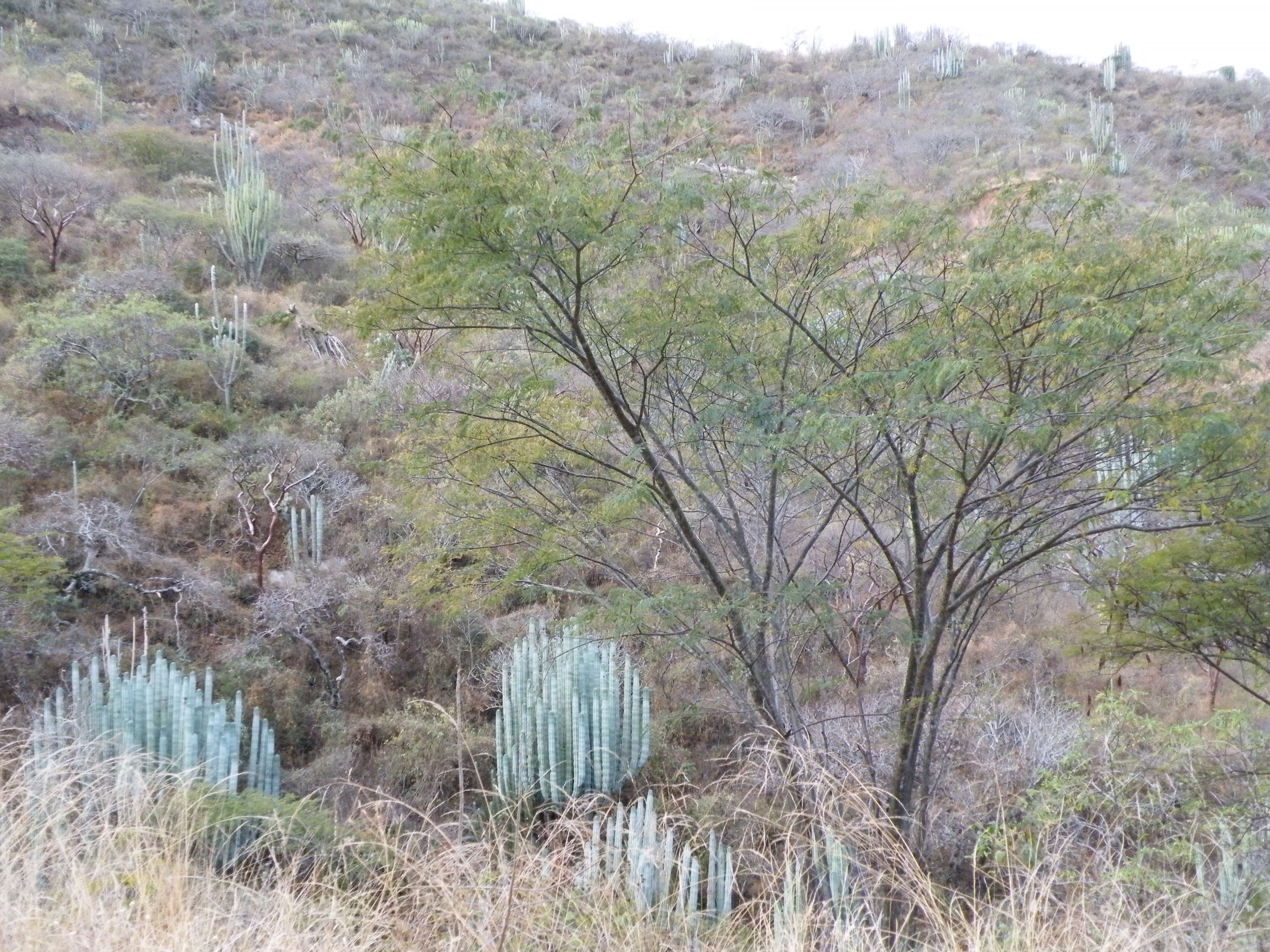
Plants growing in habitat in Tomellin, Oaxaca

== Taxonomy ==
It was first described as Cereus weberi in 1896 by John Merle Coulter. The specific epithet weberi honors the physician and botanist Frédéric Albert Constantin Weber. Spanish common names are "Candelabro", "Cardón" and "Chico". Curt Backeberg placed the species in the genus Pachycereus in 1960. Nomenclature synonyms are Lemaireocereus weberi (J.M.Coult.) Britton & Rose (1909), Ritterocereus weberi (J.M.Coult.) Backeb. (1951) and Stenocereus weberi (J.M.Coult.) Buxb. (1961).
