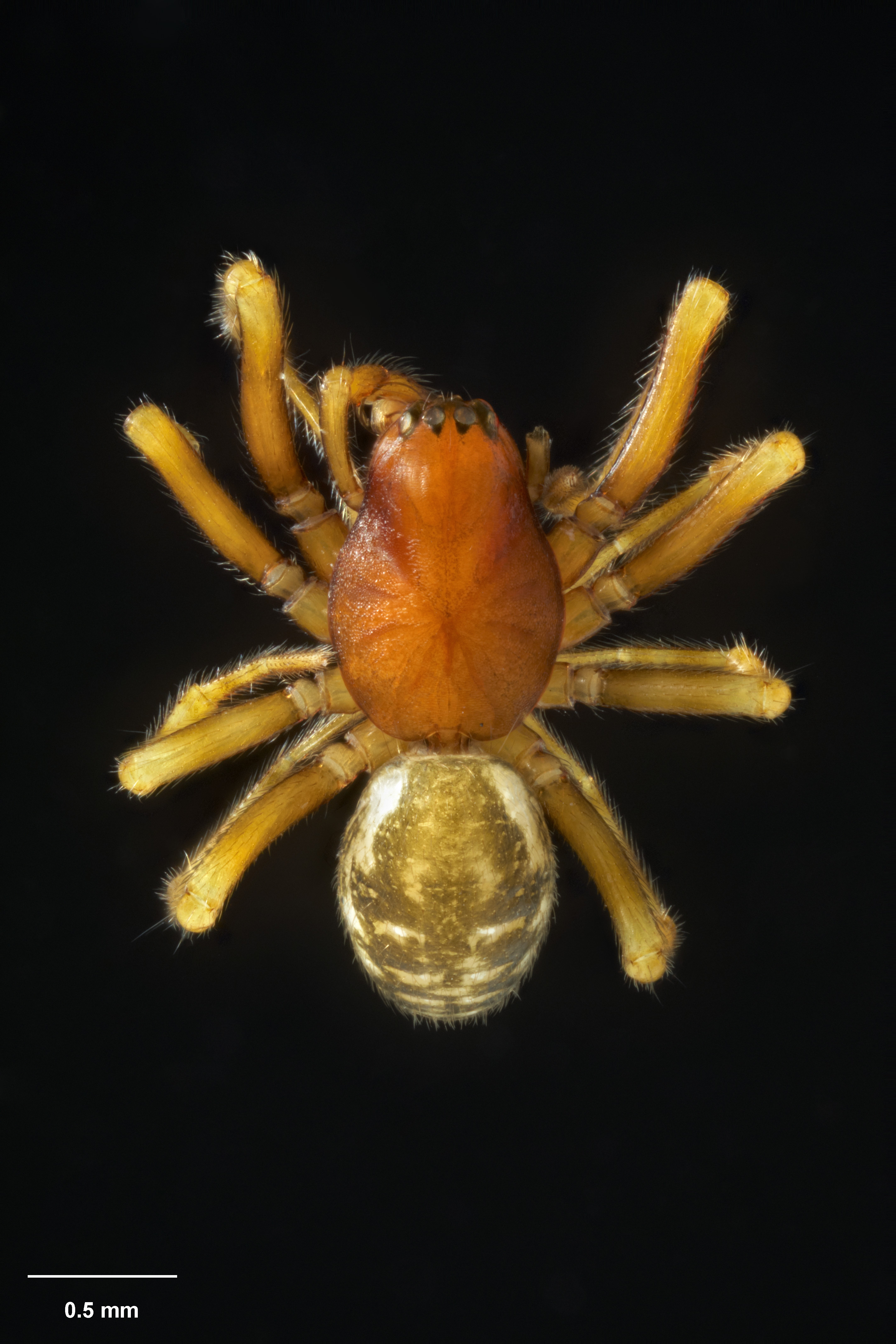

Conservation status
- Data Deficient (NZ TCS)

Scientific classification
- Domain: Eukaryota
- Kingdom: Animalia
- Phylum: Arthropoda
- Subphylum: Chelicerata
- Class: Arachnida
- Order: Araneae
- Infraorder: Araneomorphae
- Family: Linyphiidae
- Genus: Promynoglenes
- Species: P. minuta

Binomial name
- Promynoglenes minuta Blest & Vink, 2002

= Promynoglenes minuta =

Species of spider

Promynoglenes minuta is a species of sheet weaver spider endemic to New Zealand.

== Taxonomy ==
This species was described in 2002 by A.D Blest and Cor Vink from male and female specimens. The holotype is stored in Te Papa Museum under registration number AS.000575.

== Description ==
The male is recorded at 2.13mm in length whereas the female is 2.38mm. This species has a brown prosoma, brown legs and a dark grey abdomen that has pale markings.

== Distribution ==
This species is only known from Turangi, New Zealand.

== Conservation status ==
Under the New Zealand Threat Classification System, this species is listed as "Data Deficient" with the qualifiers of "Data Poor: Size", "Data Poor: Trend" and "One Location".
