= Promynoglenes nobilis =

Conservation status
- Not Threatened (NZ TCS)

Scientific classification
- Domain: Eukaryota
- Kingdom: Animalia
- Phylum: Arthropoda
- Subphylum: Chelicerata
- Class: Arachnida
- Order: Araneae
- Infraorder: Araneomorphae
- Family: Linyphiidae
- Genus: Promynoglenes
- Species: P. nobilis

Binomial name
- Promynoglenes nobilis Blest, 1979

Species of spider

Promynoglenes nobilis is a species of sheet weaver spider endemic to New Zealand.

== Taxonomy ==
This species was described in 1979 by A.D Blest from male and female specimens. The holotype is stored in Otago Museum.

== Description ==
The male is recorded at 3.75mm in length whereas the female is 4.96mm. This species has a dark brown cephalothorax and yellow legs that have dark markings.

== Distribution ==
This species is only known from Fiordland and Westland in New Zealand.

== Conservation status ==
Under the New Zealand Threat Classification System, this species is listed as "Not Threatened".
