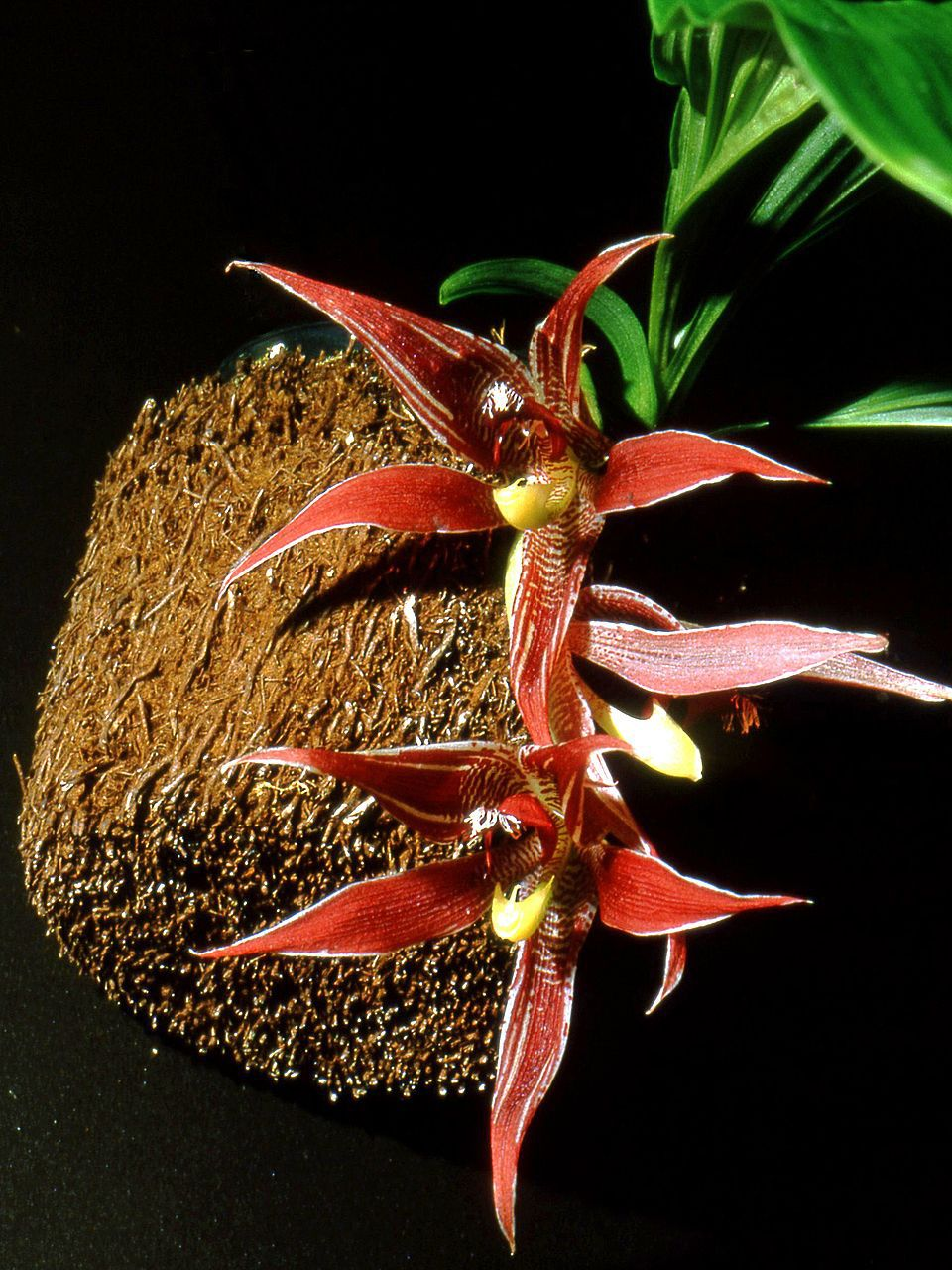
- Paphinia cristata

Scientific classification
- Kingdom: Plantae
- Clade: Tracheophytes
- Clade: Angiosperms
- Clade: Monocots
- Order: Asparagales
- Family: Orchidaceae
- Subfamily: Epidendroideae
- Tribe: Cymbidieae
- Subtribe: Stanhopeinae
- Genus: Paphinia; Lindl.

= Paphinia =

Genus of orchids

Paphinia, abbreviated in horticultural trade Pna, is a genus of orchids, composed of an estimated 16 species from Central America, northern South America and Trinidad. These species are medium-sized epiphytes with small ovoid pseudobulbs and 2 or more leaves. The generic name comes from the Greek Paphia, the name of Aphrodite of Cyprus. Most authorities consider the genus rare.

Species accepted as of June 2014:

1. Paphinia benzingii Dodson & Neudecker – Ecuador
2. Paphinia cristata (Lindl.) Lindl. – Trinidad, Colombia, Venezuela, the Guianas, northern Brazil
3. Paphinia dunstervillei Dodson & G.A.Romero – Venezuela
4. Paphinia grandiflora Barb.Rodr. – northern Brazil
5. Paphinia herrerae Dodson – Ecuador
6. Paphinia hirtzii Dodson – Ecuador
7. Paphinia levyae Garay – Ecuador
8. Paphinia lindeniana Rchb.f. – Colombia, Venezuela, Brazil, Peru
9. Paphinia litensis Dodson & Neudecker – Ecuador
10. Paphinia neudeckeri Jenny – Ecuador, Colombia
11. Paphinia posadarum Dodson & R.Escobar – Ecuador, Colombia
12. Paphinia rugosa Rchb.f. – Colombia
13. Paphinia seegeri G.Gerlach – Colombia
14. Paphinia subclausa Dressler – Costa Rica
15. Paphinia vermiculifera G.Gerlach & Dressler – Panama
16. Paphinia zamorae Garay – Ecuador

Hybrids include:

- Paphinia Majestic (P. cristata x P. herrerae)
- Paphinia Memoria Remo Lombardi (P. herrerae x P. lindeniana)
- Gonginia (Gongora x Paphinia), an intergeneric hybrid
