= Promynoglenes parvula =

Conservation status
- Not Threatened (NZ TCS)

Scientific classification
- Domain: Eukaryota
- Kingdom: Animalia
- Phylum: Arthropoda
- Subphylum: Chelicerata
- Class: Arachnida
- Order: Araneae
- Infraorder: Araneomorphae
- Family: Linyphiidae
- Genus: Promynoglenes
- Species: P. parvula

Binomial name
- Promynoglenes parvula Blest, 1979

Species of spider

Promynoglenes parvula is a species of sheet weaver spider endemic to New Zealand.

== Taxonomy ==
This species was described in 1979 by A.D Blest from male and female specimens.

== Description ==
The male is recorded at 2.12mm in length whereas the female is 2.72mm.

== Distribution ==
This species is only known from the South Island of New Zealand.

== Conservation status ==
Under the New Zealand Threat Classification System, this species is listed as "Not Threatened".
