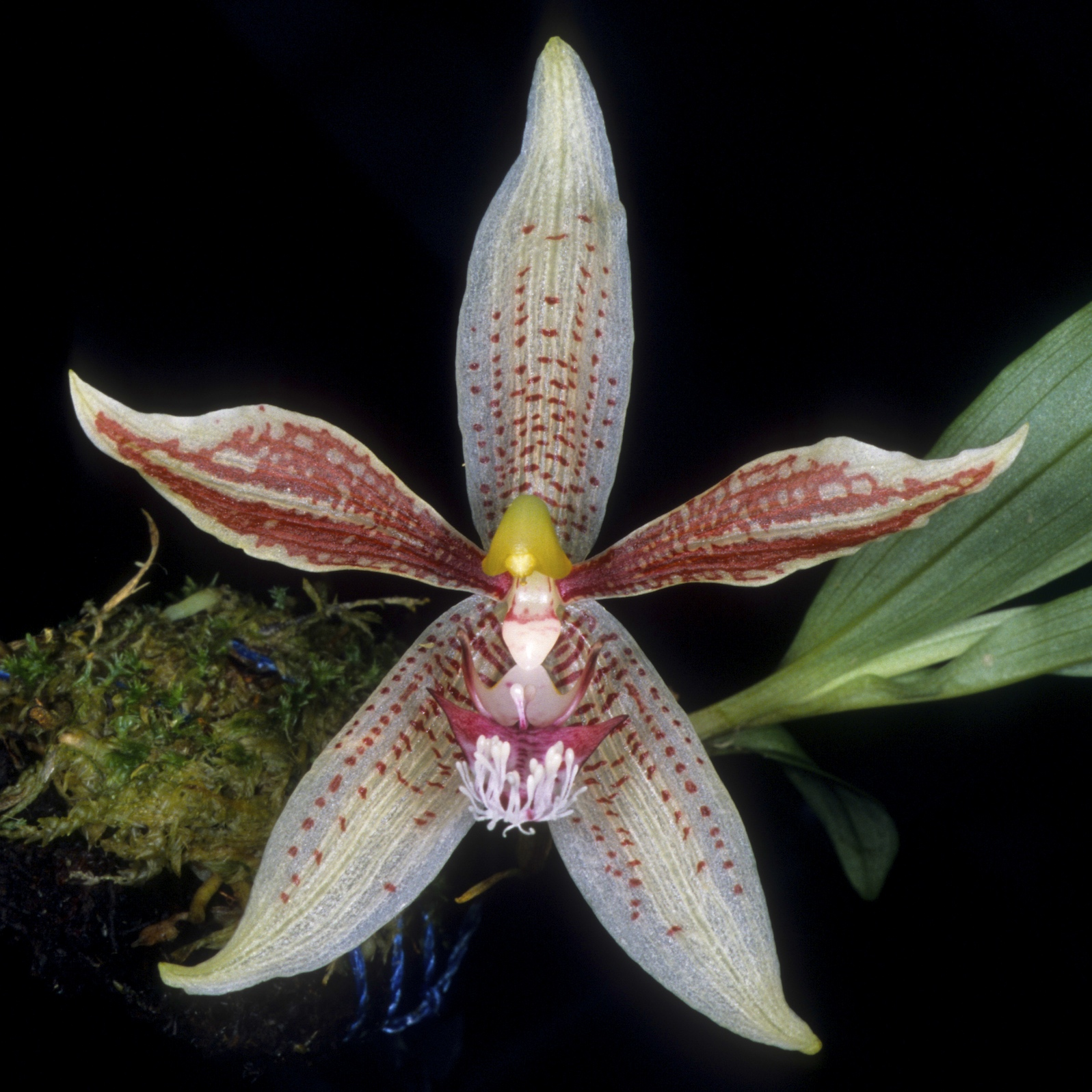

Scientific classification
- Kingdom: Plantae
- Clade: Tracheophytes
- Clade: Angiosperms
- Clade: Monocots
- Order: Asparagales
- Family: Orchidaceae
- Subfamily: Epidendroideae
- Genus: Paphinia
- Species: P. rugosa

Binomial name
- Paphinia rugosa Rchb.f.

= Paphinia rugosa =

Species of orchid

Paphinia rugosa is a species of orchid endemic to Colombia.

== Taxonomy ==
The classification of this orchid species was published by Heinrich Gustav Reichenbach (1824–1889) in Linnaea; Ein Journal für die Botanik in ihrem ganzen Umfange, xli. 110, 1877 - Berlin, Germany. This species is found in Colombia, at an altitude of approximately 8000 feet.
