= Paphinia zamorae =

Scientific classification
- Kingdom: Plantae
- Clade: Tracheophytes
- Clade: Angiosperms
- Clade: Monocots
- Order: Asparagales
- Family: Orchidaceae
- Subfamily: Epidendroideae
- Genus: Paphinia
- Species: P. zamorae

Binomial name
- Paphinia zamorae Garay

Species of orchid

Paphinia zamorae is a species of epidendroid orchid in the genus Paphinia. It is endemic to Ecuador.
