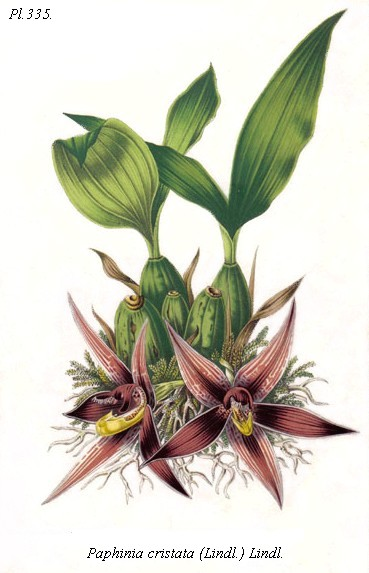
- Illustration of Paphinia cristata

Scientific classification
- Kingdom: Plantae
- Clade: Tracheophytes
- Clade: Angiosperms
- Clade: Monocots
- Order: Asparagales
- Family: Orchidaceae
- Subfamily: Epidendroideae
- Genus: Paphinia
- Species: P. cristata

Binomial name
- Paphinia cristata (Lindl.) Lindl.

Synonyms
- Maxillaria cristata Lindl. (basionym); Lycaste cristata (Lindl.) Lindl.; Paphinia randii L.Linden & Rodigas; Lycaste randii (L.Linden & Rodigas) G.Nicholson; Paphinia cristata var. modiglianiana Rchb.f.; Paphinia clausula Dressler; Paphinia cristata f. modiglianiana (Rchb.f.) O.Gruss

= Paphinia cristata =

Species of orchid

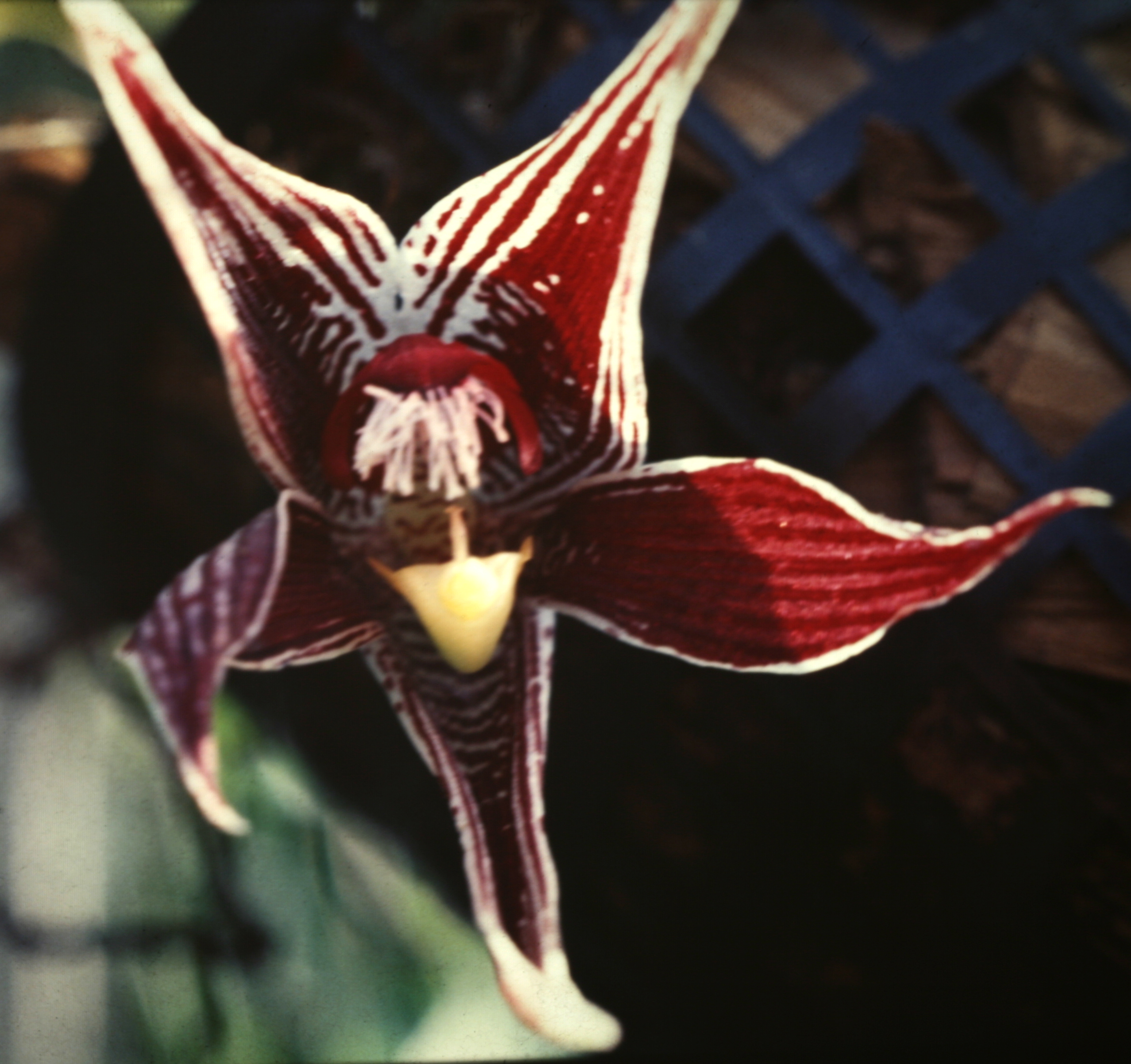

Paphinia cristata is a species of the orchid genus Paphinia and the type species of this genus. It is endemic to northern South America and the island of Trinidad. Its 1 to 3 flowered pendant inflorescence carries large, deep-red flowers. The species was published in 1843 in Edwards's Botanical Register 29: misc. page 14.

== Distribution and habitat ==
Paphinia cristata is found in Panama, Colombia, Venezuela, Guyana, Suriname, French Guiana and Trinidad at altitudes from sea level up to 1000 m, in damp forest.

== Cultivation ==
Paphinia cristata prefers warm, moist, shaded, humid conditions. Never allow plants to dry out for long periods. Mount on pieces of coconut, tree fern or cork with a pad of moss around the roots.
