= Paphinia vermiculifera =

Scientific classification
- Kingdom: Plantae
- Clade: Tracheophytes
- Clade: Angiosperms
- Clade: Monocots
- Order: Asparagales
- Family: Orchidaceae
- Subfamily: Epidendroideae
- Genus: Paphinia
- Species: P. vermiculifera

Binomial name
- Paphinia vermiculifera G.Gerlach & Dressler

Species of orchid

Paphinia vermiculifera is a species of orchid found in 2003. It is endemic to Panama. It gains its name from the Latin word vermiculus meaning worm due to two distinctive worm-shaped emergences at the base of its labellum. The original holotype was found in Coclé, El Valle de Antón. The plant flowered in cultivation on July 6, 2002. The holotype is kept at Missouri Botanical Garden.

== Taxonomy ==
The classification of this orchid species was published by Gunter Gerlach & Robert Louis Dressler; Stanhopeinae Mesoamericanae I in Laneksteriana, 8:23-30. 2003.
