= Paphinia levyae =

Scientific classification
- Kingdom: Plantae
- Clade: Tracheophytes
- Clade: Angiosperms
- Clade: Monocots
- Order: Asparagales
- Family: Orchidaceae
- Subfamily: Epidendroideae
- Genus: Paphinia
- Species: P. levyae

Binomial name
- Paphinia levyae Garay

Species of orchid

Paphinia levyae is a species of flowering plant in the Family Orchidaceae. It is endemic to Ecuador.

This plant was described in 1999.

Varieties include var. angustisegmentata.
