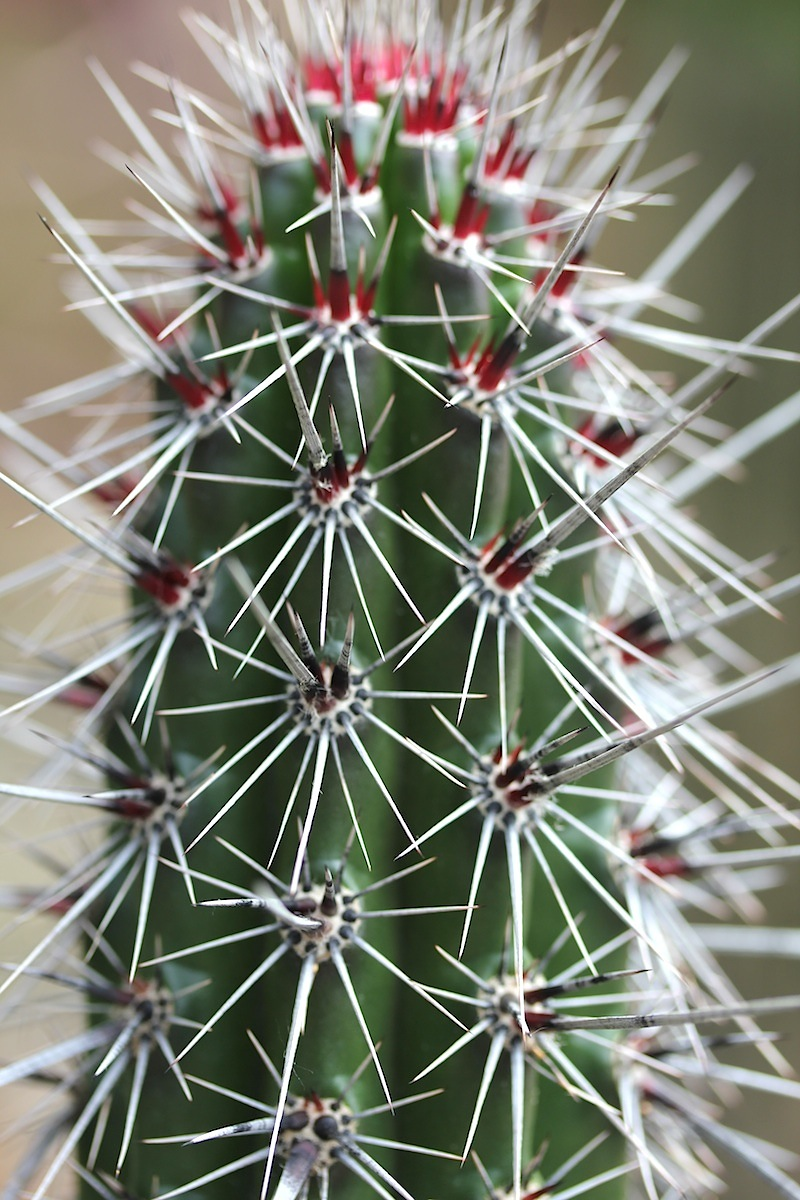
- Lemaireocereus hollianus

Scientific classification
- Kingdom: Plantae
- Clade: Tracheophytes
- Clade: Angiosperms
- Clade: Eudicots
- Order: Caryophyllales
- Family: Cactaceae
- Subfamily: Cactoideae
- Tribe: Echinocereeae
- Genus: Lemaireocereus; Britton & Rose

Type species
- Lemaireocereus hollianus

Species
- See text

= Lemaireocereus =

Genus of plant in the family Cactaceae

Lemaireocereus is a genus of cacti native to Central America and Mexico.

== Description ==
The genus contains tree-like cacti characterized by columnar stems that branch from the base. They have thin ribs, round whitish areoles, and short, stiff, bulbous spines at the base. The flowers appear near the apex of the plant and feature lanceolate or apiculate petals. The petals are ivory white or orange-yellow with fleshy pink to carmine red colors and possess leathery, fleshy bracts in the pericarpel. The receptacle tube bears hairs and trichomes. Outer tepals are papery and greenish-brown. The flowers are pollinated by bats, including Choeronycteris mexicana, Leptonycteris curasoae, and Leptonycteris nivalis.:

== Taxonomy ==
The genus Lemaireocereus was first published in 1909 by Britton and Rose in Contributions from the United States National Herbarium. Many other species from the genera Armatocereus, Cephalocereus, Stenocereus, Isolatocereus, Marshallocereus, and Lophocereus were included in this genus. At one point, the entire genus was dissolved, but these two species remain. The genus is named in honor of the French botanist and cactus specialist Charles Lemaire.

=== Species ===
As of November 2026, Plants of the World Online accepted two species:

| Image | Scientific name | Distribution |
|---|---|---|
| | Lemaireocereus hollianus (F.A.C.Weber ex J.M.Coult.) Britton & Rose 1909 | Mexico (Michoacán) |
| | Lemaireocereus lepidanthus (Eichlam) S.Arias & Terrazas 2009 | Mexico (Guerrero, Oaxaca, Puebla) |
