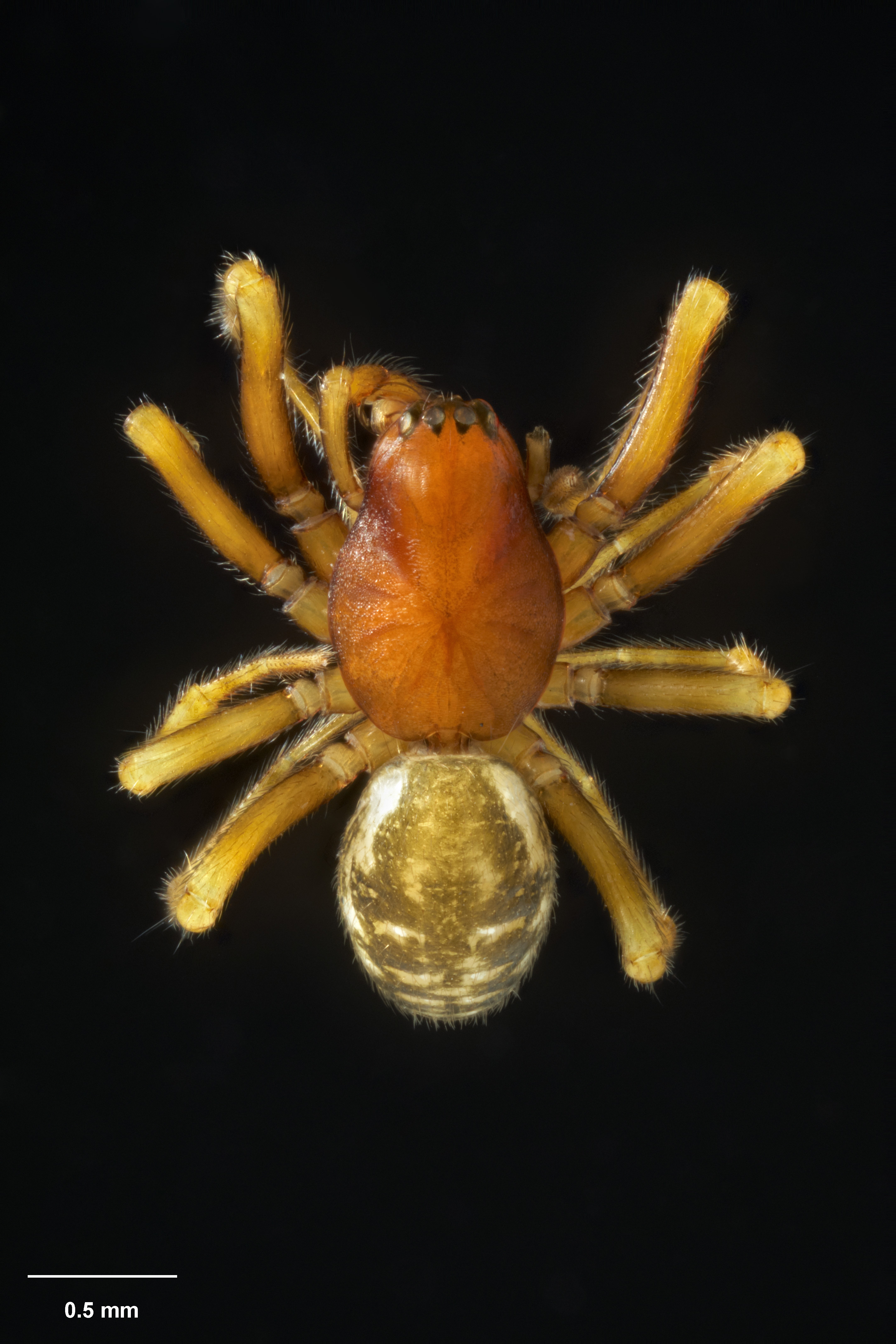
- Promynoglenes minuta

Scientific classification
- Kingdom: Animalia
- Phylum: Arthropoda
- Subphylum: Chelicerata
- Class: Arachnida
- Order: Araneae
- Infraorder: Araneomorphae
- Family: Linyphiidae
- Genus: Promynoglenes; Blest, 1979

Type species
- P. nobilis Blest, 1979

Species
- 6, see text

= Promynoglenes =

Genus of spiders

Promynoglenes is a genus of Polynesian sheet weavers that was first described by A. D. Blest in 1979.

== Species ==
As of May 2019 it contains six species, found in New Zealand:

- Promynoglenes grandis Blest, 1979 – New Zealand
- Promynoglenes minuscula Blest & Vink, 2003 – New Zealand
- Promynoglenes minuta Blest & Vink, 2002 – New Zealand
- Promynoglenes nobilis Blest, 1979 (type) – New Zealand
- Promynoglenes parvula Blest, 1979 – New Zealand
- Promynoglenes silvestris Blest, 1979 – New Zealand
