= Pachycereus grandis =

Conservation status
- Vulnerable (IUCN 3.1)

Scientific classification
- Kingdom: Plantae
- Clade: Tracheophytes
- Clade: Angiosperms
- Clade: Eudicots
- Order: Caryophyllales
- Family: Cactaceae
- Subfamily: Cactoideae
- Genus: Pachycereus
- Species: P. grandis

Binomial name
- Pachycereus grandis Rose

Synonyms
- Cereus bergerianus Vaupel 1913

Species of cactus

Pachycereus grandis is a species of Pachycereus found in Mexico.

== Description ==
Pachycereus grandis is a tree-shaped cactus that can grow 5 to 25 meters tall and is densely branched. The main stem is between 1 and 1.8 meters long and 20 to 25 centimeters wide. The shoots are light green, upright, and columnar, featuring constrictions along their lengths. Each shoot has 8 to 11 ribs that are widely spaced with areoles. Areoles are oval in shape, measuring 1 to 1.5 centimeters long and 0.5 to 0.8 centimeters wide, and are spaced 1 to 3 centimeters apart with no longitudinal groove. These branches are semi-erect and measure 16 to 22 centimeters in width. The cactus has three central spines, which are grayish-white and can grow up to 6 centimeters long, with the longest being the lowest. There are also nine to ten short, somewhat flattened radial spines varying from 7 to 10 in number, are slightly flattened, and range from 0.5 to 2.5 centimeters in length, displaying a gray color with black tips. . At the top, it has a large terminal pseudocephalium, which is covered with numerous long spines or bristles.

The flowers are white and measure 9 to 10 centimeters long, bell-shaped to funnel-shaped. Their pericarpel measures 1 to 2.5 centimeters long and 1 to 1.5 centimeters wide, featuring an elliptical shape, flower tube are covered with small tapering scales, inconspicuous bracteoles, and abundant dark brown hairs. The receptacle tube is 5 to 6 centimeters long and has triangular to lanceolate bracts with an acute to acuminate apex, fleshy texture, and yellowish bristles. The green tepals form a floral envelope where the calyx and corolla are indistinguishable, featuring consistent shapes and colors in two cycles. Internal tepals are linear or lanceolate, measuring 3 to 4 centimeters long and can be white, green, or yellow. The fruit is globose, measuring 5 to 6 centimeters long and 5 to 6.5 centimeters wide, semi-fleshy, covered in dense yellow to dark brown hairs, and has flexible, abundant spines that are yellowish brown and range from 0.5 to 4.0 centimeters long. The seeds are pyriform, measuring 5 to 6 millimeters in length.

== Distribution ==
Pachycereus grandis is commonly found in the Mexican states of México, Michoacán, Morelos, Oaxaca, and Puebla, typically at altitudes between 900 and 1,500 meters.

== Taxonomy ==
The first description was made in 1909 by Joseph Nelson Rose. The name 'grandis' is derived from Latin and means 'large,' reflecting the impressive size of this species.
