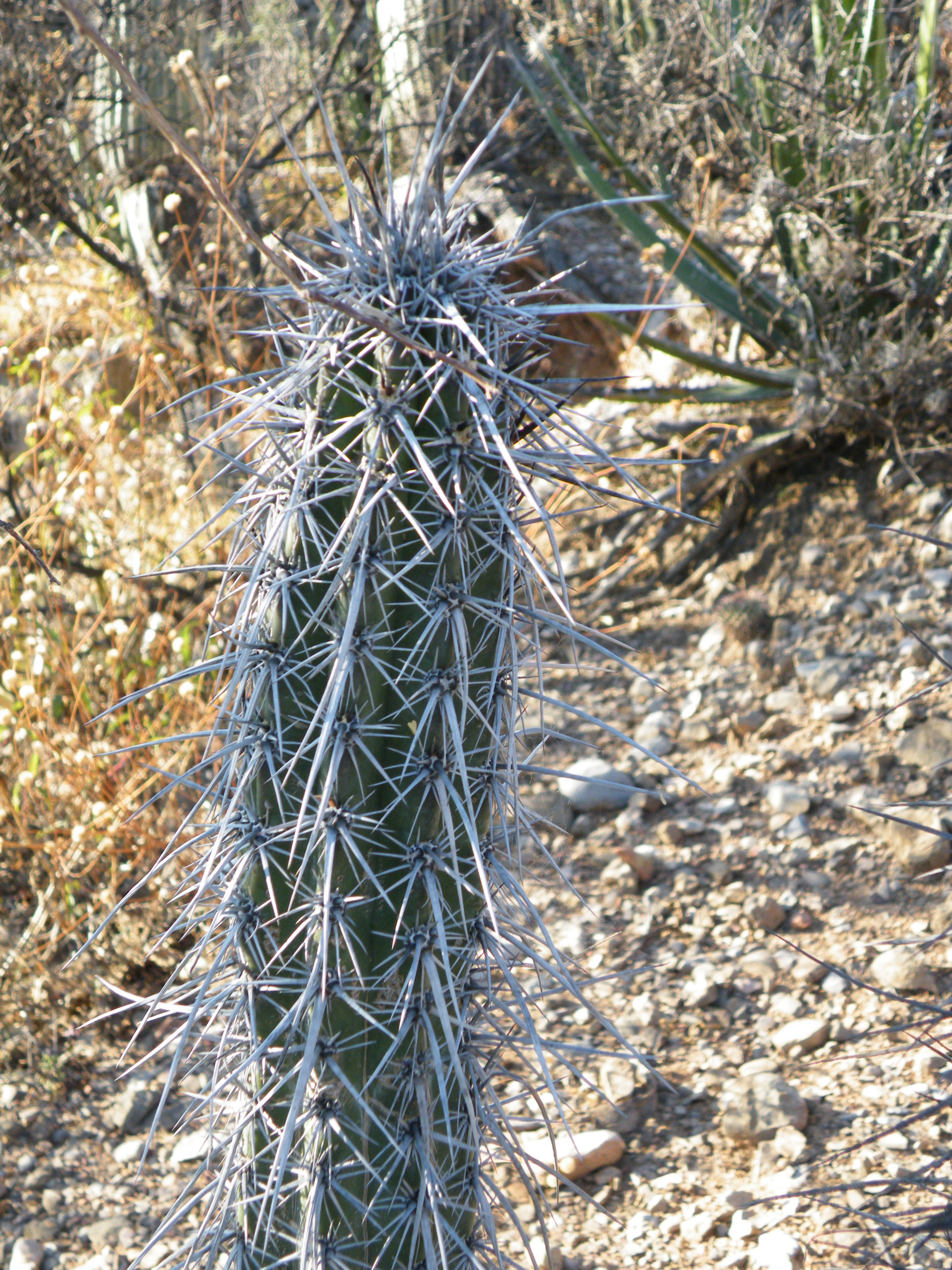

Conservation status
- Least Concern (IUCN 3.1)

Scientific classification
- Kingdom: Plantae
- Clade: Tracheophytes
- Clade: Angiosperms
- Clade: Eudicots
- Order: Caryophyllales
- Family: Cactaceae
- Subfamily: Cactoideae
- Genus: Lemaireocereus
- Species: L. hollianus

Binomial name
- Lemaireocereus hollianus (F.A.C.Weber ex J.M.Coult.) Britton & Rose 1909

Synonyms
- Cereus hollianus F.A.C.Weber ex J.M.Coult. 1896; Pachycereus hollianus (F.A.C.Weber ex J.M.Coult.) Buxb. 1961; Pachycereus hollianus f. cristatus P.V.Heath 1992

= Lemaireocereus hollianus =

Species of cactus

Lemaireocereus hollianus is a species of Lemaireocereus found in Mexico.
