= Lemaireocereus lepidanthus =

Conservation status
- Near Threatened (IUCN 3.1)

Scientific classification
- Kingdom: Plantae
- Clade: Tracheophytes
- Clade: Angiosperms
- Clade: Eudicots
- Order: Caryophyllales
- Family: Cactaceae
- Subfamily: Cactoideae
- Genus: Lemaireocereus
- Species: L. lepidanthus

Binomial name
- Lemaireocereus lepidanthus (Eichlam) S.Arias & Terrazas

Synonyms
- Anisocereus lepidanthus (Eichlam) Backeb.; Cereus lepidanthus Eichlam (basionym); Escontria lepidantha (Eichlam) Buxb.; Pachycereus lepidanthus (Eichlam) Britton & Rose

Species of cactus

Lemaireocereus lepidanthus is a species of succulent flowering plant in the genus Lemaireocereus, within the family Cactaceae. It is native to Guatemala and Honduras.

== Description ==
Lemaireocereus lepidanthus is a species of treelike columnar cactus that can reach 3 to 4 meters in height. The stems are generally solitary, although lateral branches may occasionally develop at the base. The stems can reach 8 cm in diameter and have a light green epidermis.

The stems have 7 to 8 low ribs, or rarely 9. These barely rise above the surface of the stems of robust specimens, and they are separated by shallow, depression-like grooves. In thinner individuals, the ribs are equilateral triangles in cross-section, each side of which is approximately 1 cm in length.

On adult specimens, the areoles are arranged superficially. They are neither elevated nor sunken, and are separated by a distance of approximately 1.5 cm. On young stems, they appear staggered. They are circular, measuring approximately 5 mm in diameter, and have a very low, bright white pad of trichomes that turns gray with age and slowly disappears over several years.

The central and radial spines are not always clearly distinguishable. Generally, there are approximately 10 radial spines; these measure 1 to 1.5 cm in length, and all of them are recurved towards the stem. The laterally-pointing radial spines fold into the grooves of the stem, and the lower radial spines partially rest on the areole beneath, giving the plant the appearance of having a web of intertwined spines. There is often no upper radial spine, although it may be concealed by the lower radial spines of the areole above. There are two central spines in the upper part of the areole; they are more evident on younger stems, where they form a triangle. The lower central spine is more prominent; it is straight and pointed forwards, and can reach 6 cm in length. Often, it is angled slightly downwards.

The spines are slightly widened at the base, and are not completely cylindrical. The more prominent central spine is angular, veined, frequently compressed, and somewhat twisted or wavy. On younger branches, the spines are cherry red in color with a darker apex, although they quickly change to canary yellow starting at the base. Later, they turn gray, although they retain their blackish bases and dark, translucent apices for a long period of time.

The flowers develop near the apex of the stems from areoles that are 1 to 3 years of age. The flower buds start as chestnut-colored points that expand to form a cavity within. Later, small, membranous lobes develop on the flower bud. These are arranged in a rosette, and are sepia brown in color with lighter, translucent margins, as well as slight light brown felt-like coverings at the bases. The lower lobes are narrowly lanceolate, measuring 1 to 1.5 cm in length and approximately 2 mm in width at the base. They are recurved outwards and downwards from their midpoints. The lower scales of the ovary are also narrowly lanceolate, and have areoles (which are approximately 2.5 mm in diameter, with spongy light-brown pads, and some awns up to 1.5 cm in length - see image at top of page). The transition from the ovary to the perianth is barely visible from the outside. The upper scales, which are now considered sepals, reach up to 1 cm in width and have a lengthened point. They have a membraneous appearance, and are similar in color to the scales of the ovary.

The flowers are funnel-shaped, and are yellow to orange-yellow in color. They can reach 7 cm in length and 2.5 cm in diameter. The ovary measures approximately 1.5 cm in height. The floral tube, which is clearly visible in the flower's cross-section, reaches approximately 4 cm in length and sits within a fleshy sheath. This sheath is 7 mm thick at the base and progressively thins towards the tip. Both the ovary and the floral tube have a dense covering of membranous scales. These scales have a white-yellow fleshy base that is elongated inwards, forming a longitudinal crest. The woolly pads develop as the flower matures; the awns of the scales are already present when the flower opens.

On the upper scales, the fleshy bases become longer and wider; they are yellow-green in color with carmine red margins. Below the upper scales lies the true floral perianth, which is made up of 3 to 4 whorls of tepals that are moderately inclined outwards; these measure approximately 2.5 cm in length and 8 mm in width. The lower halves of the tepals are an intense fiery red color with slight yellow undertones, while the upper halves are membranous in appearance and sepia brown in color.

The nectar chamber measures approximately 7 mm in height and is dark pink in color, with slight yellow tinges. Its walls appear grooved due to the descending stamens. The interior of the floral tube is densely covered with stamens to a height of approximately 3 cm. The lower stamens reach 1.5 cm in length, and the upper stamens barely reach 0.5 cm in length. The filaments and anthers are both light yellow in color. The style is cylindrical, measuring 4 to 5 cm in length and approximately 2 mm thick. It is pink at the bottom and white-yellow towards the apex. The style terminates in 8 slightly extended stigmal lobes, which are light yellow in color and measure approximately 5 mm in length.

The dry fruits contain numerous seeds, which are embedded in dry, off-white nutritive tissue. The seeds measure approximately 3 mm in length and 2.5 mm in width; they are slightly laterally compressed, and are very obliquely truncate at the base with a narrow white hilar scar. They are black-brown in color and very shiny, and the embryo may be clearly seen due to visible depressions in the seed coat.

== Distribution and habitat ==
Lemaireocereus lepidanthus is native to eastern Guatemala and to the Comayagua Valley in western Honduras. It primarily inhabits seasonally-dry tropical biomes. It grows at altitudes from 200 to 500 meters above sea level in low dry-deciduous forests.

== Taxonomy ==
This species was first described as Cereus lepidanthus, a name published in 1909 by the German botanist Friedrich Eichlam in the scientific journal Monatsschrift für Kakteenkunde 19: 177.

Later, the botanists Ángel Salvador Arias Montes and Teresa Terrazas transferred the species to the genus Lemaireocereus, renaming it Lemaireocereus lepidanthus. They registered these changes in the scientific journal Systematic Botany 34: 82, published in 2009.

Etymology

- Lemaireocereus: the genus name is derived from the prefix Lemaire-, which honors the French botanist Charles Lemaire (1800–1871), and from the Latin word cereus (meaning "candle"), in reference to the columnar stems of this genus.
- lepidanthus: the specific epithet is derived from the Greek words lepid (meaning "scale") and anthos (meaning "flower"), in reference to the scaly flowers exhibited by this species.

== Conservation status ==
On the IUCN Red List, Lemaireocereus lepidanthus is classified as being Near Threatened (NT), signifying that, although the species is not in immediate danger of extinction, its risk may increase if current threats persist or change.

Populations appear to be remaining stable and reproducing with ease. However, the species has a relatively small geographical distribution (which encompasses approximately 8000 km^{2}), and faces localized threats. Land use change due to agricultural expansion is one such threat, as is habitat fragmentation.

== Uses ==
This species is primarily cultivated as an ornamental, and may be propagated via seed or cuttings. Furthermore, it is planted within its native range as a natural fence for agricultural fields and corrals.

The wood of this species is also used by the local indigenous people to make lightweight doors for huts.
