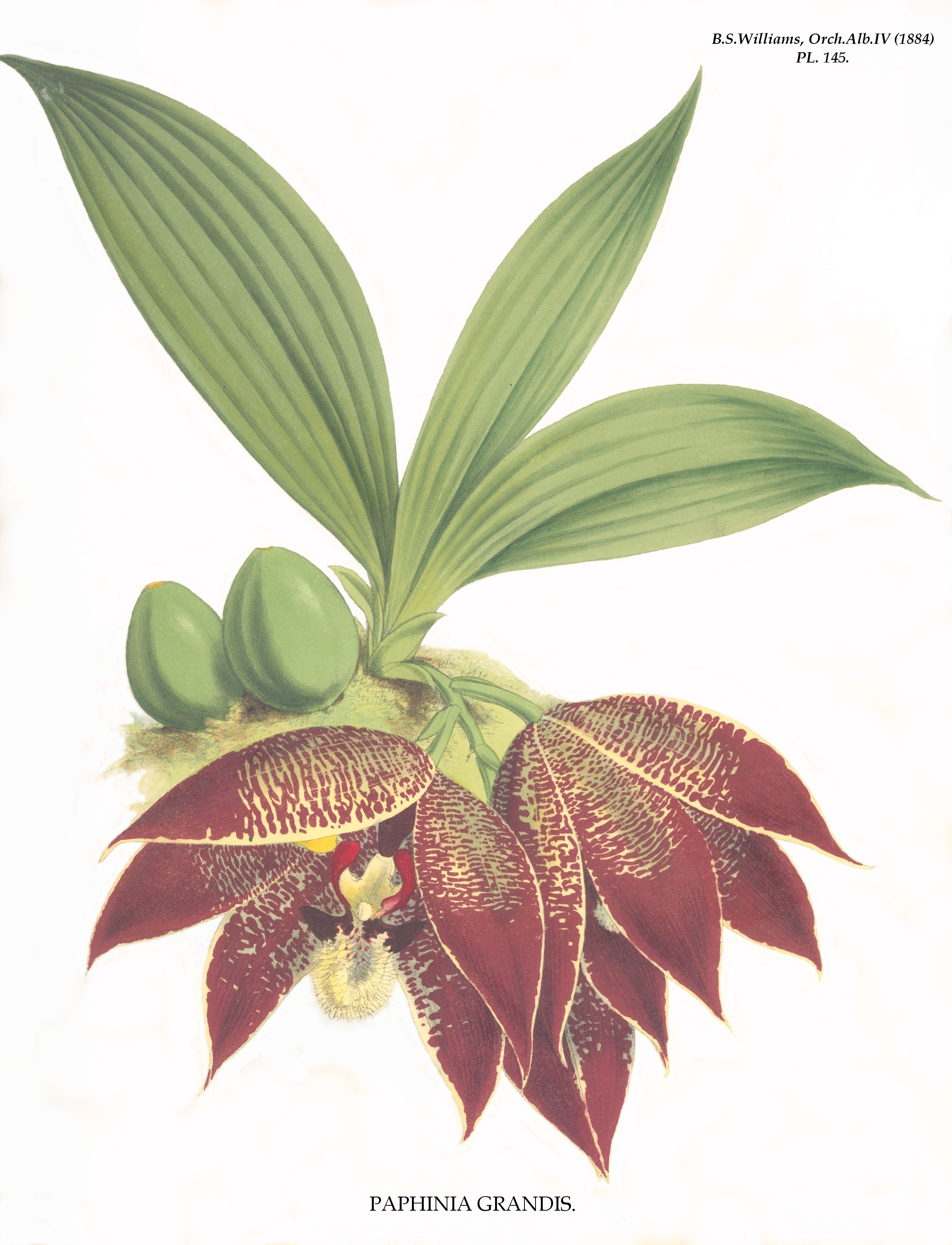

Scientific classification
- Kingdom: Plantae
- Clade: Tracheophytes
- Clade: Angiosperms
- Clade: Monocots
- Order: Asparagales
- Family: Orchidaceae
- Subfamily: Epidendroideae
- Genus: Paphinia
- Species: P. grandiflora

Binomial name
- Paphinia grandiflora Barb.Rodr.

Synonyms
- Paphinia nutans Houllet; Paphinia grandis Rchb.f. ex R.Warner

= Paphinia grandiflora =

Species of orchid

Paphinia grandiflora is a species of orchid native to Brazil.

The classification of this orchid species was published by João Barbosa Rodrigues in Genera et Species Orchidearum Novarum quas Collecit, Descripsit et Iconibus Illustravit. Sebastianopolis, Two volumes: Vol. 1, 1877; Vol. 2, 1882 (although pages 1–136 may have been published in 1881). Paphinia grandiflora is native to Brazil.
