= Promynoglenes grandis =

Conservation status
- Not Threatened (NZ TCS)

Scientific classification
- Domain: Eukaryota
- Kingdom: Animalia
- Phylum: Arthropoda
- Subphylum: Chelicerata
- Class: Arachnida
- Order: Araneae
- Infraorder: Araneomorphae
- Family: Linyphiidae
- Genus: Promynoglenes
- Species: P. grandis

Binomial name
- Promynoglenes grandis Blest, 1979

Species of spider

Promynoglenes grandis is a species of sheet weaver spider endemic to New Zealand.

== Taxonomy ==
This species was described in 1979 by A.D Blest from male and female specimens. The holotype is stored in the New Zealand Arthropod Collection under registration number NZAC03014984.

== Description ==
The male is recorded at 3.83mm in length whereas the female is 3.42mm. This species has a dark brown cephalothorax and yellow legs with black markings.

== Distribution ==
This species is known from the South Island of New Zealand.

== Conservation status ==
Under the New Zealand Threat Classification System, this species is listed as "Not Threatened".
