= Die Orchidee =

- Discipline: Orchidology
- Language: German
- Edited by: Irene Bock

Publication details
- Publisher: Deutsche Orchideen Gesellschaft (German Orchid Society) (Germany)
- Frequency: Bimonthly

Standard abbreviations
- ISO 4: Orchidee

Indexing
- ISSN: 0473-1425
- OCLC no.: 5225883

Links
- DOG

Die Orchidee is a German magazine about orchidology. It is the official publication distributed to members of the German Orchid Society.

It covers various topics such as science articles, cultivation tips, travel reports and photographs. The society's website, sometimes referred to as DOG Online, has a separate editorial team.
