= Rodrigo Escobar =

Colombian botanist

- Born: 1935
- Died: 2009 (aged 73–74)
- Scientific career
- Fields: Botanist
- Author abbrev. (botany): R.Escobar

Rodrigo Escobar y Restrepo (1935–2009) was a Colombian botanist, and a leading specialist in orchids.

== Publications ==
=== Books ===
- Escobar, Rodrigo . 1991. Native Orchids of Colombia. Ed Hill, Medellin. 6 vols.
- ----------- Jorge Mario Munera . 1994. Native Colombian Orchids: Maxillaria-Ponthieva. Volume 3 Native Colombian Orchids. 616 pp. Ed Hill. ISBN 958-638-042-4
- Carlyle A. Luer , Rodrigo Escobar, Fritz Hamer, stig Dalström . 1994. Dracularum Thesaurus: eine Monographie der Gattung Dracula, Volume 3. 78 pp. Ed Missouri Botanical Garden. ISBN 0-915279-28-2
- Carlyle A. Luer, Rodrigo Escobar . 1996. Systematics of Restrepia (Orchidaceae). Volume 13 Icones Pleurothallidinarum. 168 pp. Ed Missouri Botanical Garden. ISBN 0-915279-39-8
- Calaway H. Dodson, Rodrigo Escobar . 2004. Native Ecuadorian Orchids, Volume 1. Native Ecuadorian Orchids. Ed Hill. ISBN 958-638-099-8
