= Calaway H. Dodson =

American botanist (1928–2020)

Calaway Homer Dodson (December 17, 1928 – August 9, 2020) was an American botanist, orchidologist, and taxonomist. He specialized in orchids.

== Biography ==
Dodson was born in Selma, California. He specialized in orchidology very early in his career. Over the course of his life, he made numerous expeditions to the tropics of the Americas, covering the Andes of Colombia, Ecuador, Peru, and Bolivia, where he collected specimens and discovered new species of different genera of orchids.

In 1960 Dodson began, in collaboration with Robert Dressler, a classification of the Maxillaria of the Americas. In 1965 he presented a study of the pollinating agents of orchids and the importance that they have on the evolutionary development of the family Orchidaceae.

In the spring of 1973, Dodson was named executive director of the new Marie Selby Botanical Gardens in Sarasota, Florida, where he stayed for ten years, of which he was "Honorary Curator of Orchidaceae". In 1975, Dodson created the genus Dressleria (named after Robert Dressler) including species of the genus Catasetum, from which he also reclassified other species of the genus Clowesia.

After making various publications related to the world of orchids, Dodson worked on a project to compile information of the orchid family into a database, including images and facts from species from across the world. To date, the project has collected information on 57,000 orchids.

== Works ==
- Clasificación de Maxillariae Dressler & Dodson (1960);
- Agentes de Polinización y su Influencia sobre la Evolución de la Familia Orquidacea (1965);
- Biology of the Orchids (1967);
- Icones Plantarum Tropicarum (1998) (with 2,400 illustrations and 9 new species of Sobralia from Ecuador);
- Illustrated Plants of the Tropics C.H.Dodson, John Atwood. (1980–1993);
- Native Ecuadorian Orchids Volume 1, 2 y 3 (1993, 2001, y 2002).

== See also ==
- Carlyle A. Luer
