= List of Stelis species =

Stelis is a genus of flowering plants in the family Orchidaceae.

== Alphabetical list ==
As of August 2022, Plants of the World Online accepted the following species:

=== A ===
- Stelis abdita Luer
- Stelis aberrans Luer & R.Vásquez
- Stelis acaroi Luer & Hirtz
- Stelis aciculifolia Luer & R.Vásquez
- Stelis aclyda Luer & Hirtz
- Stelis acostaei Schltr.
- Stelis acrisepala Luer & Hirtz
- Stelis acuifera Lindl.
- Stelis acuminata Luer & Hirtz
- Stelis acuminosa Luer & R.Escobar
- Stelis acutilabia Luer & Hirtz
- Stelis acutula Luer & Hirtz
- Stelis adelphae Luer & R.Vásquez
- Stelis adinfinatum Luer & R.Escobar
- Stelis adinostachya Luer & Hirtz
- Stelis adrianae Luer
- Stelis aemula Schltr.
- Stelis aenigma Karremans & M.Díaz
- Stelis aeolica Solano & Soto Arenas
- Stelis aequoris Luer & Hirtz
- Stelis aernbyae Luer & Dalström
- Stelis affinis C.Schweinf.
- Stelis agatha Luer & Hirtz
- Stelis aggregata Luer & R.Escobar
- Stelis aglochis Luer
- Stelis agonzalezii Luer & Hirtz
- Stelis aguirreae Luer & Sijm
- Stelis alajuelensis Pridgeon & M.W.Chase
- Stelis alba Kunth
- Stelis alboviolacea Luer
- Stelis aleanophila Luer
- Stelis alfredii Schltr.
- Stelis aligera (Luer & R.Vásquez) Pridgeon & M.W.Chase
- Stelis allenii L.O.Williams
- Stelis alleyoop Luer & R.Escobar
- Stelis alloinfundibulosa J.M.H.Shaw
- Stelis aloisii (Schltr.) Pridgeon & M.W.Chase
- Stelis alta Pridgeon & M.W.Chase
- Stelis alternans Luer & Hirtz
- Stelis amabilis Luer & Hirtz
- Stelis amaliae (Luer & R.Escobar) Pridgeon & M.W.Chase
- Stelis amaliana Luer
- Stelis ambrosia Luer & R.Escobar
- Stelis amethystina Luer & R.Vásquez
- Stelis amilotensis Luer & R.Escobar
- Stelis amoena Pridgeon & M.W.Chase
- Stelis amparoana Schltr.
- Stelis amphigena O.Duque
- Stelis anagraciae Archila & Szlach.
- Stelis anchorilabia O.Duque
- Stelis ancistra (Luer & Hirtz) Pridgeon & M.W.Chase
- Stelis anderssonii Luer & Endara
- Stelis andreettae Luer & Hirtz
- Stelis andrei Luer
- Stelis angustifolia Kunth
- Stelis anisopetala O.Duque
- Stelis ann-jesupiae Luer
- Stelis annedamoniae Solano
- Stelis anolis Luer
- Stelis antennata Garay
- Stelis anthracina Luer & Hirtz
- Stelis antillensis Pridgeon & M.W.Chase
- Stelis antioquiensis Schltr.
- Stelis aperta Garay
- Stelis aphidifera Luer & Dalström
- Stelis apiculifera Luer & Hirtz
- Stelis applanata Luer & Hirtz
- Stelis apposita (Luer) Pridgeon & M.W.Chase
- Stelis aprica Lindl.
- Stelis aquinoana Schltr.
- Stelis arbuscula Luer & R.Escobar
- Stelis argentata Lindl.
- Stelis ariasii (Luer & Hirtz) Karremans
- Stelis arrecta Luer & R.Escobar
- Stelis ascendens Lindl.
- Stelis aspera (Ruiz & Pav.) Pers.
- Stelis aspergilliformis Luer & Hirtz
- Stelis asperilinguis (Rchb.f. & Warsz.) Karremans
- Stelis asperrima (Luer) Pridgeon & M.W.Chase
- Stelis asplundii Luer & Endara
- Stelis atomacea Luer & R.Escobar
- Stelis atra Lindl.
- Stelis atrocaerulea Luer
- Stelis atroculata Luer & Hirtz
- Stelis atrorubens L.O.Williams
- Stelis atroviolacea Rchb.f.
- Stelis attenuata Lindl.
- Stelis atwoodii (Luer) Pridgeon & M.W.Chase
- Stelis aurantiaca Luer & R.Vásquez
- Stelis aurea (Lindl.) Karremans
- Stelis auriculata O.Duque
- Stelis aviceps Lindl.
- Stelis avirostris (Luer & Hirtz) Pridgeon & M.W.Chase
- Stelis azuayensis Luer

=== B ===
- Stelis bacriosa Luer & R.Vásquez
- Stelis ballatrix Luer & R.Vásquez
- Stelis barbae Schltr.
- Stelis barbellata Luer & Hirtz
- Stelis barbimentosa Luer & Endara
- Stelis barbuda O.Duque
- Stelis batillacea (Luer) Pridgeon & M.W.Chase
- Stelis baudoensis Luer & R.Escobar
- Stelis beckii Luer & R.Vásquez
- Stelis beniensis Luer
- Stelis benzingii Luer & Hirtz
- Stelis bermejoensis Luer & Hirtz
- Stelis bevilacquana (Carnevali & I.Ramírez) Karremans
- Stelis bialaria Luer & R.Escobar
- Stelis bicallosa Schltr.
- Stelis bicarinata Luer & Hirtz
- Stelis bicolor Luer & Hirtz
- Stelis bicornis Lindl.
- Stelis bifalcis (Schltr.) Pridgeon & M.W.Chase
- Stelis bigibba Schltr.
- Stelis binotii De Wild.
- Stelis biserrula Lindl.
- Stelis bivalvis Luer
- Stelis blandita Luer & R.Escobar
- Stelis bogotensis Schltr.
- Stelis bolivarensis Luer & Hirtz
- Stelis bovilinguis Luer & Hirtz
- Stelis boyacensis Luer & R.Escobar
- Stelis braccata Rchb.f. & Warsz.
- Stelis brachiata Luer
- Stelis brachyrachis Luer & Hirtz
- Stelis brachystachya Luer & R.Vásquez
- Stelis bracteata Schltr.
- Stelis bracteolenta Luer & R.Escobar
- Stelis bracteosa (C.Schweinf.) Pridgeon & M.W.Chase
- Stelis bractescens Garay
- Stelis bradei Schltr.
- Stelis brenesii Schltr.
- Stelis brenneri (Luer) Karremans
- Stelis brevilabris Lindl.
- Stelis brevis Schltr.
- Stelis brevissimicaudata Luer & Hirtz
- Stelis bricenorum G.A.Romero & Luer
- Stelis brittoniana Rolfe
- Stelis brunnea (Dressler) Pridgeon & M.W.Chase
- Stelis bucaramangae (Luer & R.Escobar) Pridgeon & M.W.Chase
- Stelis buccella Luer & Hirtz
- Stelis bucculenta Luer & Hirtz
- Stelis butcheri Luer
- Stelis buxiflora Luer & Hirtz

=== C ===
- Stelis caesariata Luer & Hirtz
- Stelis caespitosa Lindl.
- Stelis caespitula Luer & R.Escobar
- Stelis cairoensis Luer
- Stelis cajanumae Luer & Hirtz
- Stelis calantha Luer & Hirtz
- Stelis calceolaris Garay
- Stelis calculosa Luer & R.Escobar
- Stelis caldaria Luer & R.Vásquez
- Stelis caldodsonii Luer & R.Escobar
- Stelis caliensis Luer
- Stelis calolemma Luer & Hirtz
- Stelis calopsix Luer & R.Escobar
- Stelis calothece Schltr.
- Stelis calotricha Schltr.
- Stelis calyptrata Luer & Hirtz
- Stelis campanulifera Lindl.
- Stelis canae (Ames) Pridgeon & M.W.Chase
- Stelis candida (Luer & Hirtz) Karremans
- Stelis capijumensis Luer & Toscano
- Stelis capillaris Lindl.
- Stelis capitata Luer & Hirtz
- Stelis capsula Luer & Hirtz
- Stelis carcharodonta Carnevali & G.A.Romero
- Stelis carchica Luer & Hirtz
- Stelis cardenasii Luer & R.Vásquez
- Stelis carnalis Luer & R.Escobar
- Stelis carnosiflora Ames & C.Schweinf.
- Stelis carnosilabia (A.H.Heller & A.D.Hawkes) Pridgeon & M.W.Chase
- Stelis carnosipetala Luer & R.Vásquez
- Stelis carnosula Cogn.
- Stelis caroliae Luer
- Stelis carpinterae (Schltr.) Pridgeon & M.W.Chase
- Stelis carta Luer & Hirtz
- Stelis cassidis (Lindl.) Pridgeon & M.W.Chase
- Stelis catenata Karremans
- Stelis cauda-equina Luer & R.Vásquez
- Stelis caudex Luer & R.Escobar
- Stelis cauliflora (Lindl.) Pridgeon & M.W.Chase
- Stelis cavatella Luer & R.Vásquez
- Stelis caveata O.Duque
- Stelis cavernosa Luer & Hirtz
- Stelis cavernula Luer & Dalström
- Stelis celesticola Luer & Hirtz
- Stelis celsa Luer & Hirtz
- Stelis chaetostoma Luer & Hirtz
- Stelis chalatantha Luer & Hirtz
- Stelis chamaestelis (Rchb.f.) Garay & Dunst.
- Stelis chasei Luer
- Stelis chasmiphora Luer & R.Escobar
- Stelis chemophora Luer & Hirtz
- Stelis chihobensis Ames
- Stelis chiliantha Luer & R.Escobar
- Stelis chlorantha Barb.Rodr.
- Stelis chlorina (Luer) Pridgeon & M.W.Chase
- Stelis chocoensis O.Duque
- Stelis choerorhyncha (Luer) Pridgeon & M.W.Chase
- Stelis choriantha Dod
- Stelis chuspipatensis Luer & R.Vásquez
- Stelis ciliaris Lindl.
- Stelis ciliatissima Luer & Hirtz
- Stelis ciliolata Luer & Dalström
- Stelis cingens Luer & Hirtz
- Stelis citrinella Luer
- Stelis cladophora Luer & R.Escobar
- Stelis clausa Luer & R.Vásquez
- Stelis cleistogama Schltr.
- Stelis cleistogamoides O.Duque
- Stelis clematis Luer & R.Escobar
- Stelis climacella Luer & R.Escobar
- Stelis clipeus O.Duque
- Stelis cloesiorum Luer
- Stelis clusaris Luer & Hirtz
- Stelis cobanensis (Schltr.) Pridgeon & M.W.Chase
- Stelis coccidata Luer & R.Vásquez
- Stelis coccidifera Luer & R.Escobar
- Stelis cochabambae J.M.H.Shaw
- Stelis cochabambensis Karremans
- Stelis cochlearis Garay
- Stelis cochliops Luer & Hirtz
- Stelis cocornaensis (Luer & R.Escobar) Pridgeon & M.W.Chase
- Stelis coeliaca Luer & Hirtz
- Stelis coelochila Luer
- Stelis coleata Luer & Hirtz
- Stelis collina Schltr.
- Stelis colombiana Ames
- Stelis colorata O.Duque
- Stelis colossus Luer & R.Escobar
- Stelis columnaris Lindl.
- Stelis comica O.Duque
- Stelis comosa Luer & R.Vásquez
- Stelis complanata Luer & F.Werner
- Stelis compressicaulis Luer, Thoerle & F.Werner
- Stelis concava M.R.Miranda, S.G.Furtado & Menini
- Stelis conchipetala Luer & R.Escobar
- Stelis concinna Lindl.
- Stelis condorensis Luer & Hirtz
- Stelis conduplicata Luer, Thoerle & F.Werner
- Stelis congesta Luer & Hirtz
- Stelis conmixta Schltr.
- Stelis conochila (Luer) Pridgeon & M.W.Chase
- Stelis consors Luer & R.Vásquez
- Stelis convallaria (Schltr.) Pridgeon & M.W.Chase
- Stelis convoluta (Lindl.) Pridgeon & M.W.Chase
- Stelis cooperi Schltr.
- Stelis copiosa Luer & Hirtz
- Stelis coracina Luer & Hirtz
- Stelis corae Foldats
- Stelis coralloides Luer & Hirtz
- Stelis coriifolia Lindl.
- Stelis coripatae (Luer & R.Vásquez) Karremans
- Stelis corniculata Luer & Hirtz
- Stelis coroicensis Luer & R.Vásquez
- Stelis coronaria Luer
- Stelis cosangae (Luer & Hirtz) Pridgeon & M.W.Chase
- Stelis costaricensis Rchb.f.
- Stelis cotyligera Luer & Hirtz
- Stelis cracens Luer & Hirtz
- Stelis crassilabia Schltr.
- Stelis crassisepala Luer & R.Escobar
- Stelis craticula Luer & R.Escobar
- Stelis crenata (Lindl.) Pridgeon & M.W.Chase
- Stelis crenulata O.Duque
- Stelis creodantha Luer & Hirtz
- Stelis crescentiicola Schltr.
- Stelis crinita Luer & Hirtz
- Stelis croatii Luer
- Stelis crossota Luer & Hirtz
- Stelis cruenta O.Duque
- Stelis cryophila Luer & Hirtz
- Stelis cryptopetala Luer & Hirtz
- Stelis crystallina Ames
- Stelis cuatrecasasii (Luer) Pridgeon & M.W.Chase
- Stelis cubensis Schltr.
- Stelis cubicularia Luer & R.Vásquez
- Stelis cucullata Ames
- Stelis cuculligera Schltr.
- Stelis cuencana Schltr.
- Stelis culmosa Luer & R.Escobar
- Stelis cundinamarcae Schltr.
- Stelis cupidinea Luer & R.Escobar
- Stelis cupreata Luer & R.Escobar
- Stelis curiosa Luer & R.Escobar
- Stelis cuspidata Ames
- Stelis cutucuensis Luer & Hirtz
- Stelis cyathiflora (C.Schweinf.) Pridgeon & M.W.Chase
- Stelis cyathiformis Luer & Hirtz
- Stelis cyathochila Luer & R.Escobar
- Stelis cycloglossa Schltr.
- Stelis cylindrata Pridgeon & M.W.Chase
- Stelis cylindrica (Luer) Pridgeon & M.W.Chase
- Stelis cymbisepala Pridgeon & M.W.Chase
- Stelis cypripedioides (Luer) Pridgeon & M.W.Chase

=== D ===
- Stelis dactyloptera Rchb.f.
- Stelis dalessandroi Luer
- Stelis dalstroemii Luer
- Stelis damianii Karremans
- Stelis dapidis Luer & R.Escobar
- Stelis dapsilis Pridgeon & M.W.Chase
- Stelis darwinii Luer & R.Vásquez
- Stelis dasysepala Luer & R.Escobar
- Stelis debilis Luer
- Stelis decipiens Schltr.
- Stelis decipula Luer & R.Escobar
- Stelis declivis (Lindl.) Luer
- Stelis decurrens Pridgeon & M.W.Chase
- Stelis decurva Luer
- Stelis dejavu Luer & R.Escobar
- Stelis delasotae Luer
- Stelis delhierroi Luer & Hirtz
- Stelis delicata Luer & Hirtz
- Stelis dendrophila Luer & R.Escobar
- Stelis depauperata Lindl.
- Stelis deregularis Barb.Rodr.
- Stelis desantiagoi Solano & Salazar
- Stelis desautelsii Luer
- Stelis despectans Schltr.
- Stelis deuteowerneri J.M.H.Shaw
- Stelis deuteroadrianae J.M.H.Shaw
- Stelis deuterodewildei J.M.H.Shaw
- Stelis dewildei Luer & R.Escobar
- Stelis dialissa Rchb.f.
- Stelis dies-natalis Karremans & M.Díaz
- Stelis diffusa C.Schweinf.
- Stelis digitata Luer & Hirtz
- Stelis digitifera Luer & R.Escobar
- Stelis dilatata (C.Schweinf.) Pridgeon & M.W.Chase
- Stelis dimidia (Luer) Karremans
- Stelis dimidiata Luer & Hirtz
- Stelis diminuta (Luer) Pridgeon & M.W.Chase
- Stelis dinoi Luer & R.Vásquez
- Stelis diprizo Luer
- Stelis dirigens Luer & Hirtz
- Stelis discoidea Luer & Dalström
- Stelis discolor Rchb.f.
- Stelis discophylla Luer & Hirtz
- Stelis discors Luer & Hirtz
- Stelis discrepans Luer, Thoerle & F.Werner
- Stelis dissidens Luer & R.Escobar
- Stelis dissimulans Luer & Dodson
- Stelis distans Luer & Hirtz
- Stelis disticha Poepp. & Endl.
- Stelis dithele Luer & R.Escobar
- Stelis divaricans Luer & R.Escobar
- Stelis divergens Luer & R.Escobar
- Stelis diversifolia Luer & Hirtz
- Stelis dolabrata Luer
- Stelis dolichantha Luer & Hirtz
- Stelis dolichopus Schltr.
- Stelis domingensis Cogn.
- Stelis donaxopetala Luer
- Stelis dracontea (Luer) Pridgeon & M.W.Chase
- Stelis dressleri Luer
- Stelis drewii Luer & Endara
- Stelis dromedarina Luer & Hirtz
- Stelis duckei E.M.Pessoa & M.Alves
- Stelis dunstervilleorum Foldats
- Stelis dupliciformis C.Schweinf.
- Stelis duquei P.Ortiz
- Stelis dusenii Garay
- Stelis dussii Cogn.
- Stelis dynamica Luer & R.Escobar

=== E ===
- Stelis ebenea Luer & Hirtz
- Stelis ecmeles Luer
- Stelis effusa Schltr.
- Stelis efsiella Luer
- Stelis ejuncida Luer & R.Escobar
- Stelis ekmanii Schltr.
- Stelis elatior Lindl.
- Stelis elatissima Luer & Hirtz
- Stelis elegans Luer & R.Vásquez
- Stelis elementaria Luer & R.Escobar
- Stelis ellipsophylla Luer & R.Escobar
- Stelis elongata Kunth
- Stelis elongatissima Luer & Hirtz
- Stelis emarginata (Lindl.) Soto Arenas & Solano
- Stelis embreei Luer & Hirtz
- Stelis encephalota Luer & Hirtz
- Stelis enervis Luer
- Stelis enormis Luer & R.Escobar
- Stelis entrichota Luer & Hirtz
- Stelis ephippium Luer & R.Escobar
- Stelis erecta O.Duque
- Stelis erectiflora (Luer) J.M.H.Shaw
- Stelis erucosa (Luer & R.Escobar) Pridgeon & M.W.Chase
- Stelis escobarii Luer
- Stelis esmeraldae Luer & Hirtz
- Stelis espinosae Luer & Endara
- Stelis eublepharis Rchb.f.
- Stelis eudialema Luer & Hirtz
- Stelis eugenii Schltr.
- Stelis euglossina Luer & R.Escobar
- Stelis euprepes Luer & R.Escobar
- Stelis euspatha Rchb.f.
- Stelis eustylis Luer & Hirtz
- Stelis euthema Luer & R.Escobar
- Stelis exacta Luer & Hirtz
- Stelis exaltata Luer & R.Escobar
- Stelis exasperata Luer
- Stelis excelsa (Garay) Pridgeon & M.W.Chase
- Stelis exigua Luer & Hirtz
- Stelis exilis Luer & Hirtz
- Stelis expansa (Lindl.) Pridgeon & M.W.Chase
- Stelis exquisita Luer

=== F ===
- Stelis fabulosa Luer & Endara
- Stelis falcatiloba (Ames) Bogarín & Serracín
- Stelis falcifera Luer & Hirtz
- Stelis famelica Luer & R.Escobar
- Stelis farinosa Luer & R.Vásquez
- Stelis fasciculata Luer
- Stelis fascinata Luer & R.Escobar
- Stelis fecunda Luer & R.Escobar
- Stelis felix Luer & R.Escobar
- Stelis fendleri Lindl.
- Stelis ferrelliae Pridgeon & M.W.Chase
- Stelis filiformis Lindl.
- Stelis filomenoi Schltr.
- Stelis fissurata Luer & Hirtz
- Stelis fissurosa Luer & R.Escobar
- Stelis flacca Rchb.f.
- Stelis flaccida (Klinge) Pridgeon & M.W.Chase
- Stelis flagellaris Luer & Hirtz
- Stelis flagellifera Luer & R.Escobar
- Stelis flava Luer & Hirtz
- Stelis flexa Schltr.
- Stelis flexilis Luer & Hirtz
- Stelis flexuella Luer & R.Escobar
- Stelis flexuosissima Luer & Hirtz
- Stelis floresii Luer & Hirtz
- Stelis florianii Luer
- Stelis floripendens O.Duque
- Stelis florulenta Luer
- Stelis fluxflorum Luer & R.Escobar
- Stelis foetida O.Duque
- Stelis fons-stellarum Luer & R.Vásquez
- Stelis fonsflorum (Lindl.) Pridgeon & M.W.Chase
- Stelis formosa Luer & Hirtz
- Stelis fornicata (Luer) Pridgeon & M.W.Chase
- Stelis fornix Luer & R.Escobar
- Stelis fortis Luer & Dalström
- Stelis fortunae (Luer & Dressler) Pridgeon & M.W.Chase
- Stelis foveata Lindl.
- Stelis fractiflexa Ames & C.Schweinf.
- Stelis fragilis Luer
- Stelis franciscana O.Duque
- Stelis franciscensis Luer & F.Werner
- Stelis fredoniensis O.Duque
- Stelis freyi Luer & Toscano
- Stelis frondifera Luer & R.Escobar
- Stelis frontinensis O.Duque
- Stelis fuchsii Luer & R.Vásquez
- Stelis furculifera (Dressler & Bogarín) Bogarín
- Stelis furfuracea F.Lehm. & Kraenzl.
- Stelis fusilifera Luer & R.Escobar

=== G ===
- Stelis galapagosensis Luer & R.Escobar
- Stelis galeata (Lindl.) Pridgeon & M.W.Chase
- Stelis galeola Luer & Hirtz
- Stelis galerasensis (Luer) Pridgeon & M.W.Chase
- Stelis gargantua Pridgeon & M.W.Chase
- Stelis gastrodes Luer & Hirtz
- Stelis gelida (Lindl.) Pridgeon & M.W.Chase
- Stelis gemma Garay
- Stelis gemmulosa Luer & Hirtz
- Stelis gentryi Luer & Dodson
- Stelis genychila Garay
- Stelis gerontica Luer & R.Escobar
- Stelis gibbosa Luer & R.Vásquez
- Stelis gigantea Pridgeon & M.W.Chase
- Stelis gigantissima Luer
- Stelis gigapetala Luer & R.Escobar
- Stelis giraffina Luer & R.Escobar
- Stelis glaberrima Luer & Hirtz
- Stelis glacensis Dod
- Stelis glanduligera Luer & Hirtz
- Stelis glaucus A.Doucette & J.Portilla
- Stelis globiflora Rchb.f.
- Stelis globosa Pridgeon & M.W.Chase
- Stelis globulifera Luer & Hirtz
- Stelis glochochila Luer & R.Escobar
- Stelis glomerosa Luer
- Stelis glomifera Luer & R.Escobar
- Stelis gloriae O.Duque
- Stelis glossula Rchb.f.
- Stelis glossulicles Luer & Hirtz
- Stelis glumacea Lindl.
- Stelis gnoma Pridgeon & M.W.Chase
- Stelis gongylophora Luer & R.Escobar
- Stelis gracilifolia C.Schweinf.
- Stelis gracilis Ames
- Stelis grandibracteata C.Schweinf.
- Stelis grandiflora Lindl.
- Stelis gravida Luer & R.Escobar
- Stelis greenwoodii Soto Arenas & Solano
- Stelis grossilabris Rchb.f.
- Stelis guerrerensis Soto Arenas & Solano
- Stelis guianensis Rolfe
- Stelis gunningiana (Barb.Rodr.) ined.
- Stelis gustavoi O.Duque
- Stelis guttata (Luer) Pridgeon & M.W.Chase

=== H ===
- Stelis habrostachya Luer & Hirtz
- Stelis hagsateri Solano
- Stelis hallii Lindl.
- Stelis haltonii Luer
- Stelis hamiltoniana J.M.H.Shaw
- Stelis hamiltonii (Luer) Pridgeon & M.W.Chase
- Stelis hammelii Luer
- Stelis hansenacea Luer & R.Escobar
- Stelis harlingii (Garay) Pridgeon & M.W.Chase
- Stelis hercules Luer & R.Escobar
- Stelis herzogii Schltr.
- Stelis heteroarcuata J.M.H.Shaw
- Stelis heterosepala Schltr.
- Stelis hiatilabia Luer & R.Escobar
- Stelis hippocrepica Luer & R.Escobar
- Stelis hirsuta Garay
- Stelis hirtella (Garay) Luer
- Stelis hirtzii Luer
- Stelis hispida Luer & Hirtz
- Stelis hoeijeri Luer & Dalström
- Stelis hoppii Schltr.
- Stelis hualluapampensis Collantes & Karremans
- Stelis huilensis O.Duque
- Stelis humboldtina Luer & Hirtz
- Stelis humidensis Luer & R.Escobar
- Stelis humilis Lindl.
- Stelis hutchisonii D.E.Benn. & Christenson
- Stelis hyacinthalis Luer & R.Escobar
- Stelis hydra (Karremans & C.M.Sm.) Karremans
- Stelis hydroidea Luer & Hirtz
- Stelis hylophila Rchb.f.
- Stelis hymenantha Schltr.
- Stelis hymenopetala Luer & Endara
- Stelis hypsela Luer
- Stelis hypsitera Luer & R.Escobar

=== I–J ===
- Stelis ibischiorum Luer & R.Vásquez
- Stelis imbricans Luer & Hirtz
- Stelis immersa (Linden & Rchb.f.) Pridgeon & M.W.Chase
- Stelis immodica Luer & Hirtz
- Stelis imperalis Luer & R.Escobar
- Stelis imperiosa Luer & R.Escobar
- Stelis impostor Luer & Hirtz
- Stelis imraei (Lindl.) Pridgeon & M.W.Chase
- Stelis inamoena Luer & R.Escobar
- Stelis inclinata O.Duque
- Stelis index Luer & R.Escobar
- Stelis inedita Luer & R.Escobar
- Stelis inflata Luer
- Stelis infundibulosa (Luer) Pridgeon & M.W.Chase
- Stelis ingridiana Luer & Hirtz
- Stelis inquisiviensis Luer & R.Vásquez
- Stelis insectifera Karremans
- Stelis intermedia Poepp. & Endl.
- Stelis intonsa Luer & Endara
- Stelis ionantha Luer & R.Escobar
- Stelis ipialesensis Luer & Hirtz
- Stelis irrasa Luer & R.Vásquez
- Stelis isthmi Schltr.
- Stelis itatiayae Schltr.
- Stelis iwatsukae T.Hashim.
- Stelis jalapensis (Kraenzl.) Pridgeon & M.W.Chase
- Stelis jamesonii Lindl.
- Stelis janetiae (Luer) Pridgeon & M.W.Chase
- Stelis janus Luer & Hirtz
- Stelis jatunyacuensis Luer & Hirtz
- Stelis jenssenii Urb.
- Stelis jesupiorum (Luer & Hirtz) Karremans
- Stelis jimburae Luer & Hirtz
- Stelis johnsonii Ames
- Stelis jorgei Luer
- Stelis jubata Luer & R.Vásquez
- Stelis juncea Luer & Hirtz
- Stelis juninensis Kraenzl.
- Stelis jurisdicciensis Luer & R.Escobar
- Stelis jurisdixii (Luer & R.Escobar) Pridgeon & M.W.Chase
- Stelis juxta (Luer, Thoerle & F.Werner) J.M.H.Shaw

=== K–L ===
- Stelis kailae Solano & C.Dietz
- Stelis kareniae Luer
- Stelis kautskyi Luer & Toscano
- Stelis kefersteiniana (Rchb.f.) Pridgeon & M.W.Chase
- Stelis kentii Luer
- Stelis kilimanjaro Luer & R.Vásquez
- Stelis kroemeri Luer
- Stelis kuijtii Luer & Hirtz
- Stelis lacertina Luer & R.Escobar
- Stelis laevigata (Lindl.) Pridgeon & M.W.Chase
- Stelis laevis (Luer & Hirtz) Pridgeon & M.W.Chase
- Stelis lagarantha Luer & R.Escobar
- Stelis lagarophyta (Luer) Karremans
- Stelis lalinensis Luer & R.Escobar
- Stelis lamellata Lindl.
- Stelis laminata (Luer) Pridgeon & M.W.Chase
- Stelis lanata Lindl.
- Stelis lancea Lindl.
- Stelis lanceolata (Ruiz & Pav.) Willd.
- Stelis lancifera Luer & R.Escobar
- Stelis langlassei Schltr.
- Stelis lankesteri Ames
- Stelis lanuginosa Luer & Dalström
- Stelis lapazensis Villegas-Murillo & Karremans
- Stelis lapinerae Soto Arenas & Solano
- Stelis laplanadensis Luer & R.Escobar
- Stelis lappacea Luer & Teague
- Stelis larsenii Luer
- Stelis lasallei Foldats
- Stelis latimarginata Luer & Hirtz
- Stelis latipetala Ames
- Stelis latisepala C.Schweinf.
- Stelis laudabilis Luer & Hirtz
- Stelis lauta Karremans
- Stelis laxa Schltr.
- Stelis lehmanneptis (Luer & R.Escobar) Pridgeon & M.W.Chase
- Stelis lehmanniana (Schltr.) Karremans
- Stelis lehmannii Pridgeon & M.W.Chase
- Stelis lennartii Karremans
- Stelis lentiginosa Lindl.
- Stelis lepidella Luer & Hirtz
- Stelis leprina Luer & R.Escobar
- Stelis leptochila Luer & R.Escobar
- Stelis leptorhiza Luer & R.Escobar
- Stelis leptoschesa Luer & Hirtz
- Stelis leucantha Luer
- Stelis levicula Luer
- Stelis liberalis Luer & J.Portilla
- Stelis ligulata (Lindl.) Pridgeon & M.W.Chase
- Stelis lijiae Luer & R.Escobar
- Stelis lilliputana Luer & F.Werner
- Stelis limbata Luer & Hirtz
- Stelis lindenii Lindl.
- Stelis lindleyana Cogn.
- Stelis listerophora (Schltr.) Pridgeon & M.W.Chase
- Stelis listrophylla Luer & Hirtz
- Stelis litensis Luer & Hirtz
- Stelis llipiensis Luer & Hirtz
- Stelis loculifera Luer
- Stelis loefgrenii Cogn.
- Stelis loejtnantii Luer & Endara
- Stelis londonnii O.Duque
- Stelis longipetala O.Duque
- Stelis longipetiolata Ames
- Stelis longiracemosa Schltr.
- Stelis longirepens Carnevali & J.L.Tapia
- Stelis longispicata (L.O.Williams) Pridgeon & M.W.Chase
- Stelis longissima Luer & Hirtz
- Stelis lopezii Luer
- Stelis lorenae Luer
- Stelis loxensis Lindl.
- Stelis lueri Karremans
- Stelis lueriana J.M.H.Shaw
- Stelis lugoi Luer & Endara
- Stelis luisii Luer
- Stelis lumbricosa O.Duque
- Stelis lutea Lindl.
- Stelis luteola Luer & Hirtz
- Stelis luteria Luer & Hirtz
- Stelis lynniana Luer

=== M ===
- Stelis machupicchuensis Collantes & C.Martel
- Stelis macilenta Luer & Hirtz
- Stelis macra Schltr.
- Stelis macrolemma Luer & Endara
- Stelis maculata Pridgeon & M.W.Chase
- Stelis maderoi Schltr.
- Stelis madsenii Luer & Endara
- Stelis maduroi Luer & Sijm
- Stelis magdalenae (Rchb.f.) Pridgeon & M.W.Chase
- Stelis magnesialis Luer & Hirtz
- Stelis magnicava Dod
- Stelis magnipetala Schltr.
- Stelis maguirei (Luer) Karremans
- Stelis major Rchb.f.
- Stelis majorella Luer & Hirtz
- Stelis majuscula Luer
- Stelis maloi Luer
- Stelis malvina Luer, Thoerle & F.Werner
- Stelis mammillata Luer & Hirtz
- Stelis mandoniana Schltr.
- Stelis mandonii (Rchb.f.) Pridgeon & M.W.Chase
- Stelis maniola Luer & Hirtz
- Stelis marginata Luer & R.Escobar
- Stelis marioi Luer & Hirtz
- Stelis martinezii Solano
- Stelis matula Luer & Hirtz
- Stelis maxima Lindl.
- Stelis maxonii Schltr.
- Stelis medinae Luer & Hirtz
- Stelis mediocarinata (C.Schweinf.) Karremans
- Stelis meerenbergensis Luer & R.Escobar
- Stelis megachlamys (Schltr.) Pupulin
- Stelis megalocephala Luer
- Stelis megaloglossa Luer
- Stelis megalops Luer & Hirtz
- Stelis meganthera Luer
- Stelis megapetala Luer
- Stelis megistantha Schltr.
- Stelis melanopus (F.Lehm. & Kraenzl.) Karremans
- Stelis melanostele (Luer & R.Vásquez) Pridgeon & M.W.Chase
- Stelis melanoxantha Rchb.f.
- Stelis membranacea Luer & Hirtz
- Stelis memorialis Luer & Hirtz
- Stelis mendietae (Luer, Thoerle & F.Werner) J.M.H.Shaw
- Stelis mendozae Luer
- Stelis menippe Luer & R.Escobar
- Stelis meridana (Rchb.f.) Karremans
- Stelis mesohybos Schltr.
- Stelis micacea Luer & Hirtz
- Stelis micklowii Luer
- Stelis micragrostis Schltr.
- Stelis micrantha (Sw.) Sw.
- Stelis microchila Schltr.
- Stelis micropetala Luer & Hirtz
- Stelis microstigma Rchb.f.
- Stelis microsynema Luer & Hirtz
- Stelis microtatantha Schltr.
- Stelis microtis Rchb.f.
- Stelis milagrensis Luer & Hirtz
- Stelis millenaria Luer
- Stelis minima Luer & Toscano
- Stelis minuscula Luer & R.Vásquez
- Stelis minutissima Luer
- Stelis mirabilis Schltr.
- Stelis miranda Luer & R.Escobar
- Stelis mirandae Beutelsp. & Mor.-Mol.
- Stelis misera Luer & Hirtz
- Stelis mnemonica Luer & Hirtz
- Stelis mocoana Schltr.
- Stelis modesta Barb.Rodr.
- Stelis modica Luer, Thoerle & F.Werner
- Stelis molaui Luer & Endara
- Stelis molecula Luer & R.Escobar
- Stelis molleturensis Luer & Hirtz
- Stelis molleturoi (Luer & Dodson) Pridgeon & M.W.Chase
- Stelis monetaria Luer & R.Escobar
- Stelis monicae Luer & Hirtz
- Stelis moniligera Luer & Hirtz
- Stelis montana L.O.Williams
- Stelis montis-mortensis (Karremans & Bogarín) Bogarín & Karremans
- Stelis montserratii (Porsch) Karremans
- Stelis morae Luer
- Stelis mordica Luer & R.Escobar
- Stelis morenoi Luer & R.Vásquez
- Stelis morganii Dodson & Garay
- Stelis moritzii (Rchb.f.) Pridgeon & M.W.Chase
- Stelis morula Luer & R.Escobar
- Stelis mucronella Luer
- Stelis mucronipetala Schltr.
- Stelis mucrouncata Dod
- Stelis multiflora Luer & Hirtz
- Stelis multirostris (Rchb.f.) Pridgeon & M.W.Chase
- Stelis mundula Luer & Hirtz
- Stelis muscosa Lindl.
- Stelis mystax (Luer) Pridgeon & M.W.Chase
- Stelis mystrion Luer & R.Escobar

=== N ===
- Stelis nagelii Solano
- Stelis nambijae Luer & Hirtz
- Stelis nana Lindl.
- Stelis naniflora Luer & R.Vásquez
- Stelis navicularis Garay
- Stelis naviculigera Schltr.
- Stelis neglecta I.Bock & Speckm.
- Stelis nemoralis Luer & R.Escobar
- Stelis neowerneri J.M.H.Shaw
- Stelis nephropetala Schltr.
- Stelis nepotula Luer & Hirtz
- Stelis neudeckeri Luer & Dodson
- Stelis nexipous Garay
- Stelis nexosa Luer & R.Escobar
- Stelis niessen-andreae Luer
- Stelis niesseniae (Luer) Karremans
- Stelis nigrescens Luer & Hirtz
- Stelis nigriflora (L.O.Williams) Pridgeon & M.W.Chase
- Stelis nikiae Luer & Hirtz
- Stelis ninguida Luer & Dalström
- Stelis nitens Rchb.f.
- Stelis nivalis (Luer) Pridgeon & M.W.Chase
- Stelis nonresupinata Solano & Soto Arenas
- Stelis norae Foldats
- Stelis nostalgia Luer
- Stelis nubis Ames
- Stelis nutans Lindl.
- Stelis nutationis Luer & R.Vásquez
- Stelis nycterina Luer & Hirtz

=== O ===
- Stelis oaxacana Solano
- Stelis obescula Luer & R.Escobar
- Stelis oblector Luer & R.Escobar
- Stelis oblonga (Ruiz & Pav.) Willd.
- Stelis oblongifolia Lindl.
- Stelis obovata C.Schweinf.
- Stelis obscurata Rchb.f.
- Stelis obtecta Luer & Dalström
- Stelis ocreosa Luer & R.Escobar
- Stelis octavioi Luer & R.Escobar
- Stelis odobenella Luer
- Stelis odontopetala Luer & Hirtz
- Stelis oestlundiana (L.O.Williams) Pridgeon & M.W.Chase
- Stelis oligantha Barb.Rodr.
- Stelis oligoblephara Schltr.
- Stelis oligobotrya Luer & R.Vásquez
- Stelis onychosepala Luer & R.Vásquez
- Stelis opercularis Luer
- Stelis ophioceps Luer & Hirtz
- Stelis ophiodontodes Luer & R.Escobar
- Stelis ophioglossoides (Jacq.) Sw.
- Stelis opimipetala Luer & Hirtz
- Stelis oreada Luer & Endara
- Stelis orecta Luer & Hirtz
- Stelis orectopus (Luer) Pridgeon & M.W.Chase
- Stelis oreibator Luer & R.Escobar
- Stelis ornata (Rchb.f.) Pridgeon & M.W.Chase
- Stelis orphana Luer
- Stelis ortegae Luer & Hirtz
- Stelis oscargrouchii Karremans
- Stelis oscarii Luer
- Stelis oscitans Luer
- Stelis otara Luer & R.Escobar
- Stelis ottonis Schltr.
- Stelis ovatilabia Schltr.
- Stelis oxypetala Schltr.
- Stelis oxysepala Schltr.
- Stelis ozota Luer & R.Escobar

=== P–Q ===
- Stelis pachoi Luer & R.Escobar
- Stelis pachyglossa (Lindl.) Pridgeon & M.W.Chase
- Stelis pachypetala Luer & R.Vásquez
- Stelis pachyphyta Luer & Hirtz
- Stelis pachypus F.Lehm. & Kraenzl.
- Stelis pachyrrhiza Luer & R.Vásquez
- Stelis pachystachya Lindl.
- Stelis pachythrix Luer & R.Escobar
- Stelis pactensis Luer & Hirtz
- Stelis palifera Luer & R.Escobar
- Stelis palimmeces Luer & R.Escobar
- Stelis palmeiraensis Barb.Rodr.
- Stelis pan Luer & Hirtz
- Stelis panguiensis Luer & Hirtz
- Stelis paniculata Luer & Hirtz
- Stelis papaquerensis Rchb.f.
- Stelis papilio O.Duque
- Stelis papiliopsis O.Duque
- Stelis papillifera (Rolfe) Pridgeon & M.W.Chase
- Stelis papposa Luer & R.Escobar
- Stelis papuligera (Schltr.) Karremans
- Stelis papulina Luer & Dalström
- Stelis paradisicola Luer & Hirtz
- Stelis paradoxa Luer & R.Escobar
- Stelis paraensis Barb.Rodr.
- Stelis paraguasensis Luer
- Stelis pardipes Rchb.f.
- Stelis parviflora (Ruiz & Pav.) Pers.
- Stelis parvifolia Garay
- Stelis parvilabris Lindl.
- Stelis parvipetala Luer & Hirtz
- Stelis parvula Lindl.
- Stelis pasminoi Luer
- Stelis pastoensis Schltr.
- Stelis patateensis (Luer) Pridgeon & M.W.Chase
- Stelis patella O.Duque
- Stelis patens Karremans
- Stelis patinaria Luer & Hirtz
- Stelis patzii Luer
- Stelis pauciflora Lindl.
- Stelis pauloensis Hoehne & Schltr.
- Stelis paulula Luer & H.P.Jesup
- Stelis pauxilla Luer & R.Escobar
- Stelis peculiaris Karremans
- Stelis pedanocaulon Luer & Hirtz
- Stelis peduncularis Luer & Hirtz
- Stelis peliochyla Barb.Rodr.
- Stelis pellucida (Luer & Hirtz) Pridgeon & M.W.Chase
- Stelis pelycophora Luer & Hirtz
- Stelis pendens Luer & R.Vásquez
- Stelis pendularis O.Duque
- Stelis pendulata O.Duque
- Stelis pennelliana (Luer) Pridgeon & M.W.Chase
- Stelis perbona Luer & R.Escobar
- Stelis peregrina Luer
- Stelis perexigua Luer & Hirtz
- Stelis perparva C.Schweinf.
- Stelis perpusilla Cogn.
- Stelis perpusilliflora Cogn.
- Stelis pertenuis Luer & R.Escobar
- Stelis pertusa I.Jiménez
- Stelis peruviana Damian & Karremans
- Stelis petiolaris Schltr.
- Stelis petiolata Luer & Hirtz
- Stelis phaeomelana Schltr.
- Stelis phil-jesupii Luer
- Stelis philargyrus Rchb.f.
- Stelis pholeoglossa Luer & R.Vásquez
- Stelis physoglossa Luer & F.Werner
- Stelis picea Luer & Hirtz
- Stelis pidax (Luer) Karremans
- Stelis piestopus Schltr.
- Stelis pileata (Karremans & Bogarín) Karremans & Bogarín
- Stelis pilicrepa Luer & R.Escobar
- Stelis pilifera (Lindl.) Pridgeon & M.W.Chase
- Stelis pilipapillosa O.Duque
- Stelis pilosa Pridgeon & M.W.Chase
- Stelis pilosissima Luer
- Stelis pilostoma (Luer) Pridgeon & M.W.Chase
- Stelis pilulosa Luer, Thoerle & F.Werner
- Stelis pinguis Luer & R.Escobar
- Stelis piperina Lindl.
- Stelis pisinna Luer & Hirtz
- Stelis pittieri (Schltr.) Rojas-Alv. & Karremans
- Stelis pixie Luer & Hirtz
- Stelis planipetala Ames
- Stelis platypetala Luer & Dalström
- Stelis platystachya Garay & Dunst.
- Stelis platystylis (Schltr.) Solano & Soto Arenas
- Stelis pluriracemosa Luer & Hirtz
- Stelis poasensis (Ames) Chinchilla & Karremans
- Stelis poculifera Luer & Hirtz
- Stelis pollerecta Luer & R.Escobar
- Stelis pollex Luer & Hirtz
- Stelis polyantha Luer & Hirtz
- Stelis polybotrya Lindl.
- Stelis polycarpica Luer & Hirtz
- Stelis pompalis (Ames) Pridgeon & M.W.Chase
- Stelis popayanensis F.Lehm. & Kraenzl.
- Stelis porpax Rchb.f.
- Stelis portillae Luer & Hirtz
- Stelis posadarum Luer & R.Escobar
- Stelis possoae (Luer) Karremans
- Stelis potpourri Luer
- Stelis powellii Schltr.
- Stelis praealta (Luer & Hirtz) Pridgeon & M.W.Chase
- Stelis praecipua Luer
- Stelis praemorsa Schltr.
- Stelis prava Luer & Hirtz
- Stelis preclara Luer & Hirtz
- Stelis prionota Luer & R.Escobar
- Stelis pristis Luer
- Stelis prodigiosa Luer & R.Escobar
- Stelis prolata Luer & Hirtz
- Stelis prolificans (Luer & Hirtz) Pridgeon & M.W.Chase
- Stelis prolificosa Luer & Hirtz
- Stelis prolixa (Luer & Hirtz) Pridgeon & M.W.Chase
- Stelis propagans Luer & Hirtz
- Stelis protracta Luer & Hirtz
- Stelis protuberans Luer & Hirtz
- Stelis pseudocheila (Luer & R.Escobar) Pridgeon & M.W.Chase
- Stelis psilantha (Luer) Pridgeon & M.W.Chase
- Stelis pubipetala Luer & Hirtz
- Stelis pudens Luer
- Stelis pugiunculi Lindl.
- Stelis pulchella Kunth
- Stelis pulchra Luer & R.Escobar
- Stelis punchinello Luer & R.Vásquez
- Stelis punctulata (Rchb.f.) Soto Arenas
- Stelis punicea Luer & R.Escobar
- Stelis punoensis C.Schweinf.
- Stelis purdiaei Lindl.
- Stelis purpurascens A.Rich. & Galeotti
- Stelis purpurea (Ruiz & Pav.) Willd.
- Stelis purpurella Luer & Hirtz
- Stelis purpurina Luer & R.Vásquez
- Stelis pusilla Kunth
- Stelis putumayoensis Luer & R.Escobar
- Stelis pycnochila Luer & R.Vásquez
- Stelis pygmaea Cogn.
- Stelis pyramidalis O.Duque
- Stelis quadrata Luer & R.Vásquez
- Stelis quinquenervia C.Schweinf.
- Stelis quintella Luer & Hirtz

=== R ===
- Stelis rabei Foldats
- Stelis radicans Luer & R.Escobar
- Stelis ramificans Luer & Endara
- Stelis ramonensis Schltr.
- Stelis ramosii Luer
- Stelis ramulosa Luer & Dalström
- Stelis rectangularis Luer & R.Escobar
- Stelis regalis (Luer) Karremans
- Stelis regia Luer, Thoerle & F.Werner
- Stelis regina Luer & Hirtz
- Stelis reitzii Garay
- Stelis remifolia Luer & Hirtz
- Stelis remulifera Luer & R.Escobar
- Stelis reniformis Luer & Hirtz
- Stelis repens Cogn.
- Stelis reptans Pridgeon & M.W.Chase
- Stelis reptata Luer & R.Escobar
- Stelis resupinata (Ames) Pridgeon & M.W.Chase
- Stelis retroversa O.Duque
- Stelis retusa (Lex.) Pridgeon & M.W.Chase
- Stelis retusiloba (C.Schweinf.) Pridgeon & M.W.Chase
- Stelis rhamphosa O.Duque
- Stelis rhodochila Schltr.
- Stelis rhodotantha (Rchb.f.) Pridgeon & M.W.Chase
- Stelis rhombilabia C.Schweinf.
- Stelis rhomboglossa Schltr.
- Stelis rhomboidea Garay
- Stelis ricaurtensis Luer & Hirtz
- Stelis ricii Luer & R.Vásquez
- Stelis rictoria (Rchb.f.) Pridgeon & M.W.Chase
- Stelis rictus O.Duque
- Stelis rimulata Luer & Hirtz
- Stelis ringens Schltr.
- Stelis riozunagensis Luer & Hirtz
- Stelis risaraldae Luer & R.Escobar
- Stelis robertoi Luer
- Stelis rodrigoi (Luer) Pridgeon & M.W.Chase
- Stelis rosamariae Luer & Hirtz
- Stelis roseopunctata (Lindl.) R.Bernal
- Stelis rostrata Luer
- Stelis rostratissima (Luer & J.Portilla) Karremans
- Stelis rostriformis Zambrano & Solano
- Stelis rosulenta Luer & R.Vásquez
- Stelis rotunda Luer & Hirtz
- Stelis rubens Schltr.
- Stelis rudiculifera Luer
- Stelis rudolphiana Luer & Sijm
- Stelis rufescens Luer
- Stelis rufobrunnea (Lindl.) L.O.Williams
- Stelis ruprechtiana Rchb.f.
- Stelis ruris O.Duque
- Stelis rutrum Luer & R.Vásquez

=== S ===
- Stelis saavedrensis Luer & R.Vásquez
- Stelis saccata Luer & Hirtz
- Stelis sagittata Zambrano & Solano
- Stelis sagittosa Luer & R.Vásquez
- Stelis salazarii Solano
- Stelis salomonica O.Duque
- Stelis salpingantha (Luer & Hirtz) Pridgeon & M.W.Chase
- Stelis saltatrix Luer & R.Vásquez
- Stelis samaipatensis Luer & R.Vásquez
- Stelis samson Luer & R.Escobar
- Stelis sanchezii Luer & Hirtz
- Stelis sanchoi Ames
- Stelis sanctae-rosae Luer & Hirtz
- Stelis sanguinea Garay
- Stelis sanluisensis Foldats
- Stelis santiagoensis Mansf.
- Stelis santiagoi Luer & Hirtz
- Stelis sarae Luer & Hirtz
- Stelis sarcophylla Luer
- Stelis satyrella Luer & Hirtz
- Stelis satyrica Luer & Hirtz
- Stelis saurocephala Luer & Hirtz
- Stelis saurota Luer & R.Escobar
- Stelis scaberula Luer & Hirtz
- Stelis scabrata (Lindl.) Pridgeon & M.W.Chase
- Stelis scabrida Lindl.
- Stelis scalaris Luer & R.Escobar
- Stelis scalena Luer & Hirtz
- Stelis scandens Rolfe
- Stelis scansor Rchb.f.
- Stelis scaphoglossa Luer & Hirtz
- Stelis scaphoides O.Duque
- Stelis scariosa (Lex.) Karremans
- Stelis sceptrumrubrum Luer & R.Escobar
- Stelis schenckii Schltr.
- Stelis schistochila Luer & Hirtz
- Stelis schlechteriana Garay
- Stelis schlimii (Luer) Karremans
- Stelis schmidtchenii Schltr.
- Stelis schnitteri Schltr.
- Stelis schomburgkii Fawc. & Rendle
- Stelis scitula Luer & Hirtz
- Stelis sclerophylla (Lindl.) Karremans
- Stelis scolnikiae (Luer & Endara) J.M.H.Shaw
- Stelis scopulosa Luer & Hirtz
- Stelis scutella O.Duque
- Stelis scutellifera Luer & R.Escobar
- Stelis secunda Luer & Dalström
- Stelis secundosa Luer
- Stelis segoviensis (Rchb.f.) Pridgeon & M.W.Chase
- Stelis sellaformis O.Duque
- Stelis semperflorens Luer
- Stelis septella Luer
- Stelis septicola Luer & Endara
- Stelis seriata Luer & R.Vásquez
- Stelis serra Lindl.
- Stelis serrulifera Luer & Hirtz
- Stelis sessilis Luer & Toscano
- Stelis setacea Lindl.
- Stelis siberica Luer & R.Vásquez
- Stelis signifera Luer & R.Vásquez
- Stelis sijmii Luer
- Stelis silverstonei Luer
- Stelis silvestris Luer & R.Escobar
- Stelis simplex (Ames & C.Schweinf.) Pridgeon & M.W.Chase
- Stelis simplicilabia (C.Schweinf.) Pridgeon & M.W.Chase
- Stelis singularis Luer & Hirtz
- Stelis siphonantha (Luer) Pridgeon & M.W.Chase
- Stelis situlifera Luer & Hirtz
- Stelis skutchii Ames
- Stelis sobrina Luer & R.Escobar
- Stelis soconuscana Solano
- Stelis solomonii Luer
- Stelis somnolenta Luer & Hirtz
- Stelis soratana (Rchb.f.) Karremans
- Stelis soricina Luer & Hirtz
- Stelis sororcula Luer & Hirtz
- Stelis sotoarenasii Solano
- Stelis sparsiflora Luer & Hirtz
- Stelis spathilabia (Schltr.) Karremans
- Stelis spathosa (Luer & R.Escobar) Pridgeon & M.W.Chase
- Stelis spathulata Poepp. & Endl.
- Stelis spathuliformis (Luer & R.Vásquez) Karremans
- Stelis speckmaieri Luer & Sijm
- Stelis splendens Luer
- Stelis standleyi Ames
- Stelis stapedia O.Duque
- Stelis steganopus Garay
- Stelis steinbachii Luer
- Stelis stelidiopsis (Luer) Pridgeon & M.W.Chase
- Stelis stenophylla Rchb.f.
- Stelis stergiosii (Carnevali & I.Ramírez) Karremans
- Stelis stevensonii Luer
- Stelis steyermarkii Foldats
- Stelis stigmatosa Luer & R.Escobar
- Stelis stipitata Luer & R.Escobar
- Stelis stiriosa Luer & Dalström
- Stelis stolonifera Luer & Hirtz
- Stelis storkii Ames
- Stelis straminea Luer & R.Escobar
- Stelis strictissima Luer & Hirtz
- Stelis strigosa Luer & R.Vásquez
- Stelis striolata Lindl.
- Stelis strobilacea Luer
- Stelis subequalis Luer & R.Vásquez
- Stelis subinconspicua Schltr.
- Stelis sublesta Luer & R.Escobar
- Stelis subtilis Luer & Dalström
- Stelis succuba Luer & R.Vásquez
- Stelis suinii (Luer) J.M.H.Shaw
- Stelis sulcata O.Duque
- Stelis sumacoensis Luer & Hirtz
- Stelis superbiens Lindl.
- Stelis supervivens Luer & Hirtz
- Stelis surrogatilabia Luer & Hirtz
- Stelis susanensis (Hoehne) Pridgeon & M.W.Chase
- Stelis synsepala Cogn.

=== T ===
- Stelis tachirensis Foldats
- Stelis tamboensis Luer & R.Vásquez
- Stelis tanythrix Luer & Hirtz
- Stelis tarantula (Luer & Hirtz) Pridgeon & M.W.Chase
- Stelis tarda Luer & Hirtz
- Stelis taurina O.Duque
- Stelis tauroculus Luer & R.Escobar
- Stelis taxis (Luer) Pridgeon & M.W.Chase
- Stelis teaguei Luer & Hirtz
- Stelis tempestuosa Luer & Hirtz
- Stelis tenebrosa (Archila, Szlach. & Chiron) Karremans
- Stelis tenuicaulis Lindl.
- Stelis tenuifolia Luer & Hirtz
- Stelis tenuilabris Lindl.
- Stelis tenuipetala Garay
- Stelis tenuissima Schltr.
- Stelis tepuiensis (Carnevali & I.Ramírez) Karremans
- Stelis tetramera Luer
- Stelis thamiostachya Luer & Endara
- Stelis thecoglossa Rchb.f.
- Stelis thelephora Luer, Thoerle & F.Werner
- Stelis thermophila Schltr.
- Stelis thoerleae Luer
- Stelis thomasiae (Luer) Pridgeon & M.W.Chase
- Stelis thymochila (Luer) Pridgeon & M.W.Chase
- Stelis tinekae Luer & R.Vásquez
- Stelis tintinnabula (Luer) Pridgeon & M.W.Chase
- Stelis titanica Luer & R.Escobar
- Stelis tobarii Luer & Hirtz
- Stelis tolimensis Schltr.
- Stelis tomcroatii Luer
- Stelis tomentosa Luer & R.Vásquez
- Stelis tonduziana Schltr.
- Stelis torrenticola Luer & R.Vásquez
- Stelis tortilis (Luer & R.Escobar) Pridgeon & M.W.Chase
- Stelis tortuosa Luer & Hirtz
- Stelis torulosa Luer & R.Escobar
- Stelis translucens Luer & Hirtz
- Stelis transversalis Ames
- Stelis triangulabia Ames
- Stelis triangularis Barb.Rodr.
- Stelis triangulisepala C.Schweinf.
- Stelis triapiculata Dod
- Stelis triaristata Luer
- Stelis tricardium Lindl.
- Stelis trichoglottis Luer & Dodson
- Stelis trichorrhachis Rchb.f.
- Stelis trichostoma (Luer) Pridgeon & M.W.Chase
- Stelis tricula Luer & Hirtz
- Stelis tridactyloides Luer & Hirtz
- Stelis tridactylon Luer
- Stelis tridentata Lindl.
- Stelis trifoliacea Luer & R.Escobar
- Stelis trilobata O.Duque
- Stelis trimera Luer
- Stelis triplaris Luer & R.Escobar
- Stelis triplex Luer & Hirtz
- Stelis triplicata Lindl.
- Stelis triseta Lindl.
- Stelis tritriangulata Luer & R.Escobar
- Stelis trochophora Luer & R.Escobar
- Stelis tropex Luer & Endara
- Stelis trulla (Rchb.f. & Warsz.) Pridgeon & M.W.Chase
- Stelis trullifera Luer & R.Vásquez
- Stelis trullilabia Luer & R.Escobar
- Stelis truncata Lindl.
- Stelis tryssa Luer & R.Escobar
- Stelis tsubotae Luer & R.Escobar
- Stelis tumida Luer & Hirtz
- Stelis tunariensis Luer & R.Vásquez
- Stelis tunguraguae (F.Lehm. & Kraenzl.) Pridgeon & M.W.Chase
- Stelis tweedieana Lindl.
- Stelis tyria Luer, Thoerle & F.Werner

=== U–V ===
- Stelis uberis Luer & R.Escobar
- Stelis umbelliformis Hespenh. & Dressler
- Stelis umbonis Luer & Hirtz
- Stelis umbriae Schltr.
- Stelis uncifera Luer & Hirtz
- Stelis uncinata Pridgeon & M.W.Chase
- Stelis uncinula Luer & Hirtz
- Stelis undecimi Luer & F.Werner
- Stelis unduavica (Luer & R.Vásquez) Karremans
- Stelis unduaviensis Luer & R.Vásquez
- Stelis undulata Luer & Hirtz
- Stelis uniflora Luer & Hirtz
- Stelis uninervia C.Schweinf.
- Stelis uribeorum Luer & R.Escobar
- Stelis uvaegelata L.E.Matthews
- Stelis validipes Luer & R.Escobar
- Stelis valladolidensis Luer & D'Aless.
- Stelis vallata Luer
- Stelis valvulosa Luer & R.Escobar
- Stelis vanescens Luer
- Stelis vargasii (C.Schweinf.) Pridgeon & M.W.Chase
- Stelis varicella Luer & R.Vásquez
- Stelis variola Luer & R.Escobar
- Stelis vasqueziana Karremans
- Stelis vasquezii (Luer) Karremans
- Stelis vegrandis (Luer & Dodson) Pridgeon & M.W.Chase
- Stelis velaticaulis (Rchb.f.) Pridgeon & M.W.Chase
- Stelis velatipes (Rchb.f.) Karremans
- Stelis velivolva Luer & Hirtz
- Stelis velutina Lindl.
- Stelis venezuelensis Foldats
- Stelis venosa Luer & Endara
- Stelis veracrucensis Solano
- Stelis veraguasensis Luer
- Stelis verbiformis (Luer) Pridgeon & M.W.Chase
- Stelis verecunda Schltr.
- Stelis verruculosa Luer & R.Escobar
- Stelis vesca Luer & Hirtz
- Stelis vespertina Solano & Soto Arenas
- Stelis vestita Ames
- Stelis viamontis Luer & Hirtz
- Stelis vicaria Luer & R.Escobar
- Stelis vigax Luer & R.Escobar
- Stelis vigoris Luer & R.Escobar
- Stelis villifera Luer
- Stelis villosa (Knowles & Westc.) Pridgeon & M.W.Chase
- Stelis villosilabia Luer & Hirtz
- Stelis violacea Garay
- Stelis virgata (Luer) Pridgeon & M.W.Chase
- Stelis virgulata Schltr.
- Stelis viridibrunnea F.Lehm. & Kraenzl.
- Stelis viridiflava (Karremans & Bogarín) Karremans & Bogarín
- Stelis viridula Luer
- Stelis vollesii Luer & Dodson
- Stelis voluptuosa Luer & R.Escobar
- Stelis vulcani Rchb.f.
- Stelis vulpecula Luer & R.Escobar

=== W–Z ===
- Stelis wagneri (Schltr.) Pridgeon & M.W.Chase
- Stelis walteri Schltr.
- Stelis weberbaueri Schltr.
- Stelis weddelliana (Rchb.f.) Pridgeon & M.W.Chase
- Stelis wendtii Solano
- Stelis wercklei Schltr.
- Stelis werneri Schltr.
- Stelis wilhelmii Luer
- Stelis williamsii Ames
- Stelis xenica Luer & R.Escobar
- Stelis xerophila (Schltr.) Soto Arenas
- Stelis ximenae Luer & Hirtz
- Stelis xiphizusa (Rchb.f. & Warsz.) Pridgeon & M.W.Chase
- Stelis xystophora Luer
- Stelis yanganensis Luer & Hirtz
- Stelis zamorae Luer & Hirtz
- Stelis zarumae Luer & Hirtz
- Stelis zelenkoi Luer & Hirtz
- Stelis zelleri Luer
- Stelis zigzag Luer & Hirtz
- Stelis zongoensis Luer & R.Vásquez
- Stelis zootrophionoides Castañeda-Zárate & Ramos-Castro
- Stelis zothecula Luer
- Stelis zunagensis (Luer & Hirtz) Pridgeon & M.W.Chase
