= Brenneri =

Brenneri may refer to:

== Species ==
- Caenorhabditis brenneri, species of nematode
- Heliconia brenneri, species of plant
- Pseuderemias brenneri, species of lizard
- Pseudomonas brenneri, species of bacteria
- Stelis brenneri, species of orchid
- Tillandsia brenneri, species of plant

== Other uses ==
- Sundnes Brenneri, Norwegian potato processing plant and distillery
