= S. elegans =

S. elegans may refer to:

- Sagartia elegans, a sea anemone species found in coastal areas of northwest Europe
- Salvia elegans, the pineapple sage, a perennial shrub species native to Mexico and Guatemala
- Scyphocrinus elegans, an extinct crinoid species
- Securigera elegans, a plant species
- Sphaerodactylus elegans, a gecko native to Cuba
- Stachybotrys elegans, a mold species
- Staurogyne elegans, a plant species native of Cerrado vegetation of Brazil
- Steindachnerina elegans, a fish species found in rivers in Bahia and Minas Gerais, Brazil
- Stelis elegans Luer & R.Vásquez, an orchid species found in Ecuador and Bolivia
- Sphodromantis elegans, a praying mantis species found in Ethiopia, Burkina Faso, Guinea, Mauritania, Niger, Senegal and the Congo River region
- Sympycnus elegans, a fly species

== Synonyms ==
- Scaurus elegans, a synonym for Cephalostenus elegans, a beetle species found in Greece
- Stenodes elegans, a synonym for Cochylimorpha elegans, a moth species found in Iran
- Sterna elegans, a synonym for Thalasseus elegans, the elegant tern, a seabird species found on the Pacific coasts of the southern United States and Mexico and winters south to Peru, Ecuador and Chile
- Specklinia elegans or Stelis elegans (Kunth) Pridgeon & M.W.Chase, synonyms for Stelis roseopunctata, an orchid species
- Spinosella elegans, a synonym for Callyspongia elegans, a demosponge species found in Indonesia
