= S. nana =

S. nana may refer to:

- Scoliacma nana, a moth species found in Australia
- Scutellaria nana, the dwarf skullcap, a plant species
- Siebera nana, a plant species in the genus Siebera found in Palestine
- Sphingonaepiopsis nana, the savanna hawkmoth, a moth species found from Iran to Natal
- Stelis nana, Lindl., 1858, an orchid species in the genus Stelis found in Ecuador and Peru
- Stiobia nana, the sculpin snail, a gastropod species endemic to the United States
- Sturnira nana, the lesser yellow-shouldered bat, a bat species endemic to Peru
- Sylvia nana, the Asian desert warbler, a bird species found in south central temperate Asia
- Synanceia nana, the Red Sea stonefish or dwarf scorpionfish, a venomous fish species

== See also ==
- Nana (disambiguation)
