= Stelis furculifera =

Scientific classification
- Kingdom: Plantae
- Clade: Tracheophytes
- Clade: Angiosperms
- Clade: Monocots
- Order: Asparagales
- Family: Orchidaceae
- Subfamily: Epidendroideae
- Tribe: Epidendreae
- Subtribe: Pleurothallidinae
- Genus: Stelis
- Species: S. furculifera

Binomial name
- Stelis furculifera (Dressler & Bogarín) Bogarín

Synonyms
- Condylago furculifera Dressler & Bogarín

Species of flowering plant

Stelis furculifera is a species of flowering plant in the family Orchidaceae, native to Panama. It was first described in 2007 as Condylago furculifera.

Stelis furculifera resembles Stelis rodrigoi. Differences include sepals which are more sparsely developed and less white more villous (shaggy), the absence of decurrent basal lobes on the obovate-pandurate petals, and a viscid lip-callus that is ovate rather than orbicular.
