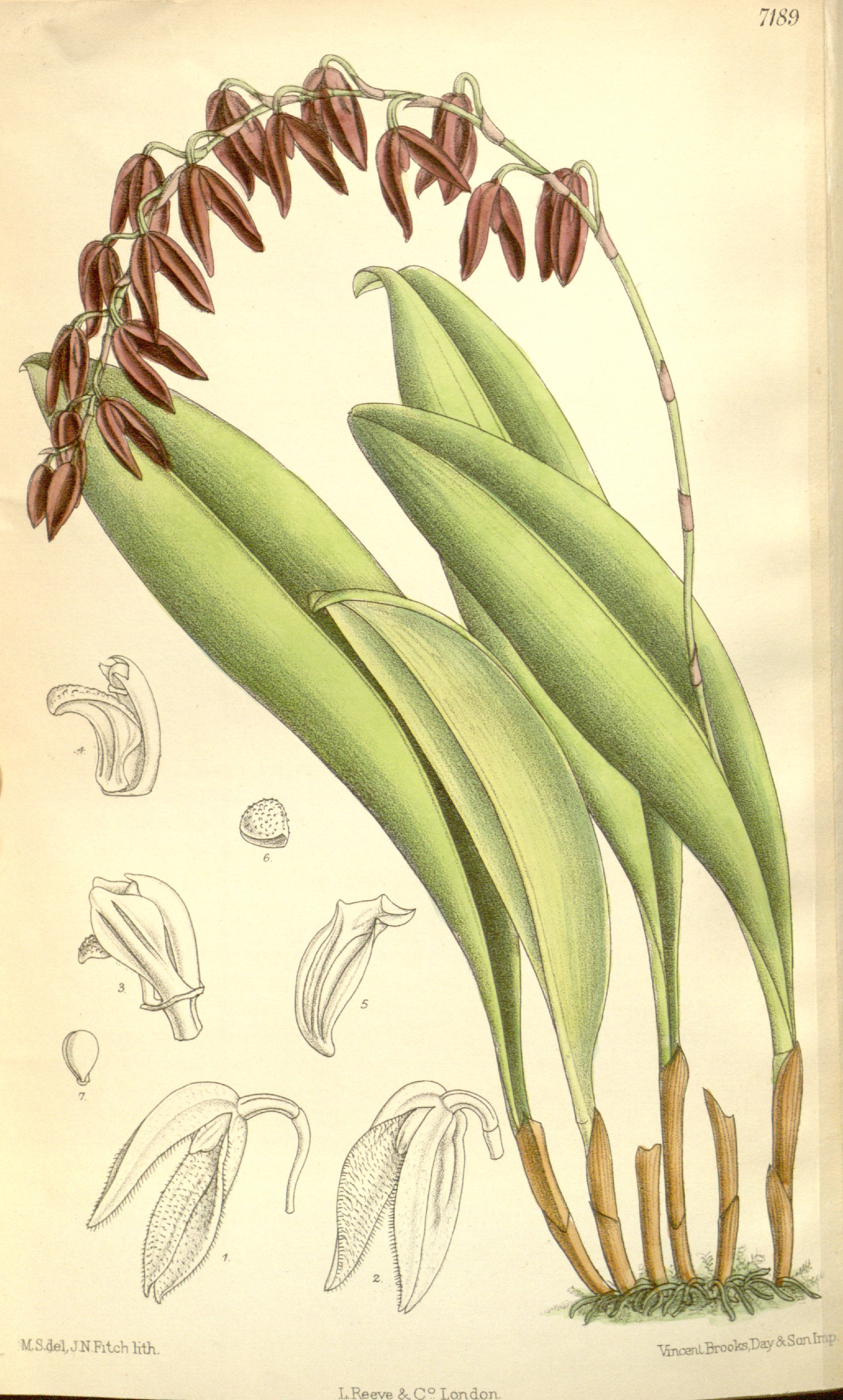
- Stelis immersa illustration

Conservation status
- Least Concern (IUCN 3.1)

Scientific classification
- Kingdom: Plantae
- Clade: Tracheophytes
- Clade: Angiosperms
- Clade: Monocots
- Order: Asparagales
- Family: Orchidaceae
- Subfamily: Epidendroideae
- Genus: Stelis
- Species: S. immersa

Binomial name
- Stelis immersa (Linden & Rchb.f.) Pridgeon & M.W.Chase

Synonyms
- Effusiella immersa (Linden & Rchb.f.) Luer; Humboltia immersa (Linden & Rchb.f.) Kuntze; Pleurothallis immersa Linden & Rchb.f.; Specklinia immersa (Linden & Rchb.f.) Luer; Humboltia krameriana (Rchb.f.) Kuntze; Pleurothallis calerae Schltr.; Pleurothallis krameriana Rchb.f.; Pleurothallis lasiosepala Schltr.

= Stelis immersa =

Species of orchid

Stelis immersa is a species of flowering plant in the family Orchidaceae.

This orchid is native to Colombia, Costa Rica, Guatemala, Honduras, Mexico, Panama, and Venezuela. It is pollinated by the females of a fly species in the genus Megaselia.
