= Stelis velaticaulis =

Scientific classification
- Kingdom: Plantae
- Clade: Tracheophytes
- Clade: Angiosperms
- Clade: Monocots
- Order: Asparagales
- Family: Orchidaceae
- Subfamily: Epidendroideae
- Genus: Stelis
- Species: S. velaticaulis

Binomial name
- Stelis velaticaulis (Rchb.f.) Pridgeon & M.W.Chase

Synonyms
- Crocodeilanthe velaticaulis (Rchb.f.) Luer; Humboltia crassipes (Lindl.) Kuntze; Humboltia velaticaulis (Rchb.f.) Kuntze; Pleurothallis crassipes Lindl.; Pleurothallis pichinchae Rchb.f.; Pleurothallis trilineata Lindl.; Pleurothallis velaticaulis Rchb.f.

Species of plant

Stelis velaticaulis is a species of orchid plant native to Colombia, Costa Rica, Ecuador, Peru, Trinidad-Tobago, and Venezuela.
