= Stelis batillacea =

Scientific classification
- Kingdom: Plantae
- Clade: Tracheophytes
- Clade: Angiosperms
- Clade: Monocots
- Order: Asparagales
- Family: Orchidaceae
- Subfamily: Epidendroideae
- Genus: Stelis
- Species: S. batillacea

Binomial name
- Stelis batillacea (Luer) Pridgeon & M.W.Chase

Synonyms
- Pleurothallis batillacea Luer

Species of orchid

Stelis batillacea is a species of orchid plant native to Ecuador.
