= Stelis pompalis =

Scientific classification
- Kingdom: Plantae
- Clade: Tracheophytes
- Clade: Angiosperms
- Clade: Monocots
- Order: Asparagales
- Family: Orchidaceae
- Subfamily: Epidendroideae
- Genus: Stelis
- Species: S. pompalis

Binomial name
- Stelis pompalis (Ames) Pridgeon & M.W.Chase

Synonyms
- Pleurothallis pompalis Ames

Species of plant

Stelis pompalis is a species of orchid plant native to Costa Rica.
