= Stelis cyathiflora =

Scientific classification
- Kingdom: Plantae
- Clade: Tracheophytes
- Clade: Angiosperms
- Clade: Monocots
- Order: Asparagales
- Family: Orchidaceae
- Subfamily: Epidendroideae
- Genus: Stelis
- Species: S. cyathiflora

Binomial name
- Stelis cyathiflora (C.Schweinf.) Pridgeon & M.W.Chase

Synonyms
- Pleurothallis cyathiflora C.Schweinf.

Species of plant

Stelis cyathiflora is a species of orchid plant native to Peru.
