= Stelis alleyoop =

Scientific classification
- Kingdom: Plantae
- Clade: Tracheophytes
- Clade: Angiosperms
- Clade: Monocots
- Order: Asparagales
- Family: Orchidaceae
- Subfamily: Epidendroideae
- Genus: Stelis
- Species: S. alleyoop

Binomial name
- Stelis alleyoop Luer & R.Escobar

Species of plant

Stelis alleyoop is a species of leach orchid in the family Orchidaceae, native to Colombia. An epiphyte, it is named for Alley Oop, the hairy caveman who is the title character of the Alley Oop comic strip.
