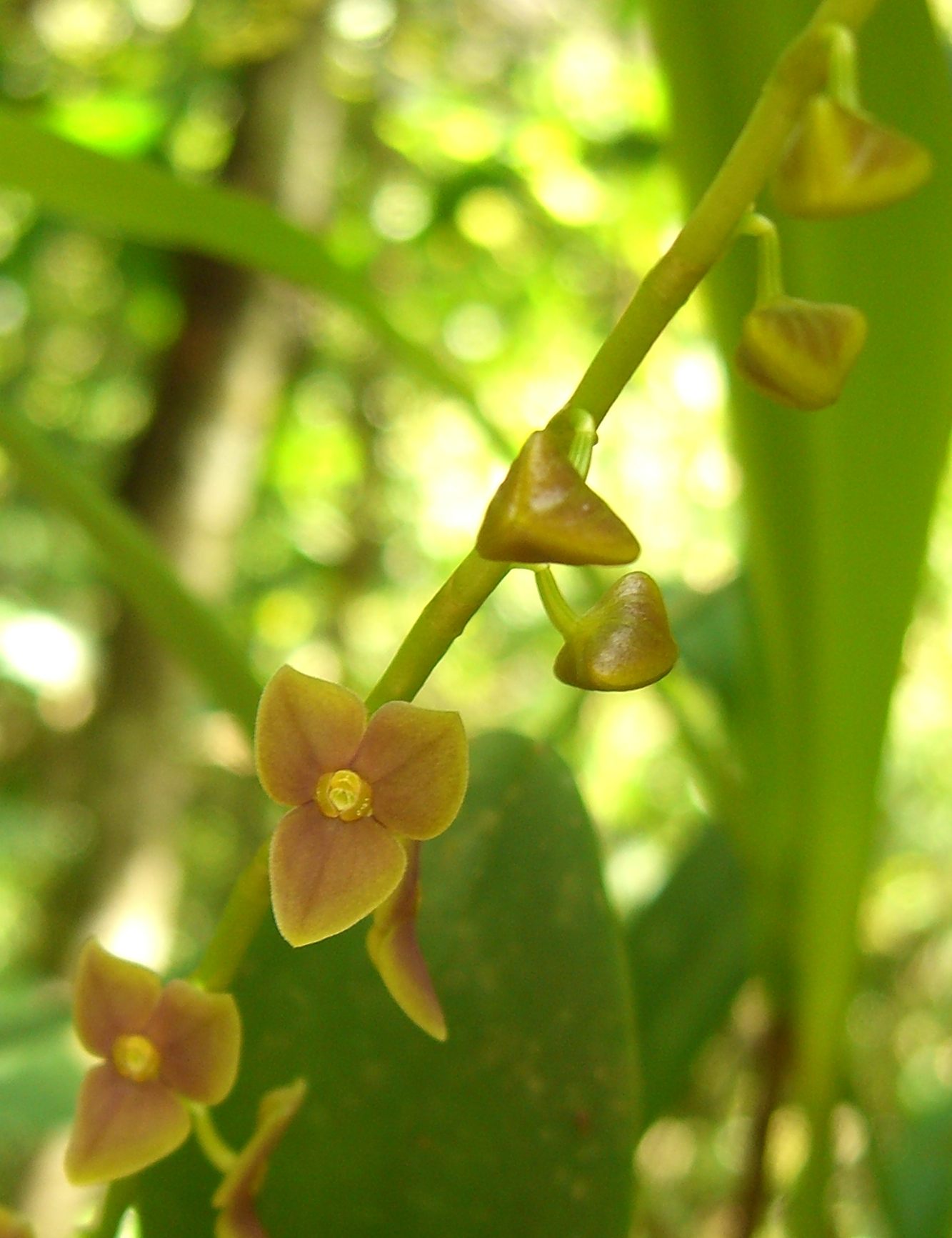
- Stelis quinquenervia inflorescence

Scientific classification
- Kingdom: Plantae
- Clade: Tracheophytes
- Clade: Angiosperms
- Clade: Monocots
- Order: Asparagales
- Family: Orchidaceae
- Subfamily: Epidendroideae
- Genus: Stelis
- Species: S. quinquenervia

Binomial name
- Stelis quinquenervia C.Schweinf

= Stelis quinquenervia =

Species of orchid

Stelis quinquenervia is a species of orchid endemic to western South America.

- Media related to Stelis quinquenervia at Wikimedia Commons
- Data related to Stelis quinquenervia at Wikispecies
