= Stelis segoviensis =

Scientific classification
- Kingdom: Plantae
- Clade: Tracheophytes
- Clade: Angiosperms
- Clade: Monocots
- Order: Asparagales
- Family: Orchidaceae
- Subfamily: Epidendroideae
- Genus: Stelis
- Species: S. segoviensis

Binomial name
- Stelis segoviensis (Rchb.f.) Pridgeon & M.W.Chase

Synonyms
- Pleurothallis segoviensis Rchb.f.

Species of plant

Stelis segoviensis is a species of orchid plant native to Nicaragua.
