= Stelis jalapensis =

Scientific classification
- Kingdom: Plantae
- Clade: Tracheophytes
- Clade: Angiosperms
- Clade: Monocots
- Order: Asparagales
- Family: Orchidaceae
- Subfamily: Epidendroideae
- Genus: Stelis
- Species: S. jalapensis

Binomial name
- Stelis jalapensis (Kraenzl.) Pridgeon & M.W.Chase

Synonyms
- Pleurothallis jalapensis (Kraenzl.) Garay

Species of plant

Stelis jalapensis is a species of orchid plant.
