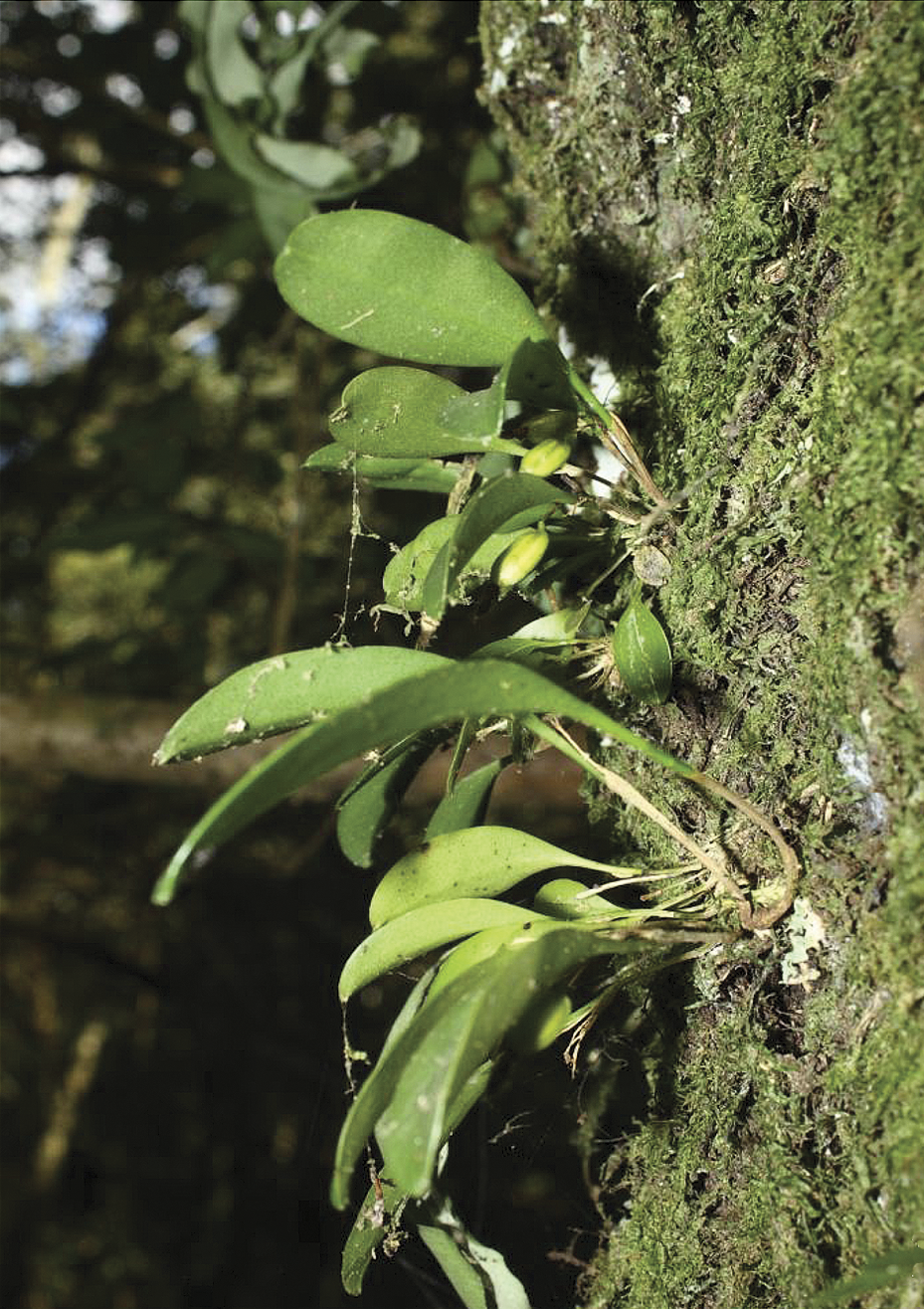
- Stelis zootrophionoides in situ during the season of vegetative growth

Scientific classification
- Kingdom: Plantae
- Clade: Tracheophytes
- Clade: Angiosperms
- Clade: Monocots
- Order: Asparagales
- Family: Orchidaceae
- Subfamily: Epidendroideae
- Genus: Stelis
- Species: S. zootrophionoides

Binomial name
- Stelis zootrophionoides Castañeda-Zárate & Ramos-Castro

= Stelis zootrophionoides =

Species of orchid

Stelis zootrophionoides is a species of orchid discovered in the cloud forest in the central highlands of Chiapas, Mexico. S. zootrophionoides was first described in 2012.

The plant flowers from July to September, develops fruits around August, and disperses seeds between October and December. So far, this species is known from only one population in the Reserva Ecológica Cerro Huitepec, and is considered rare.
