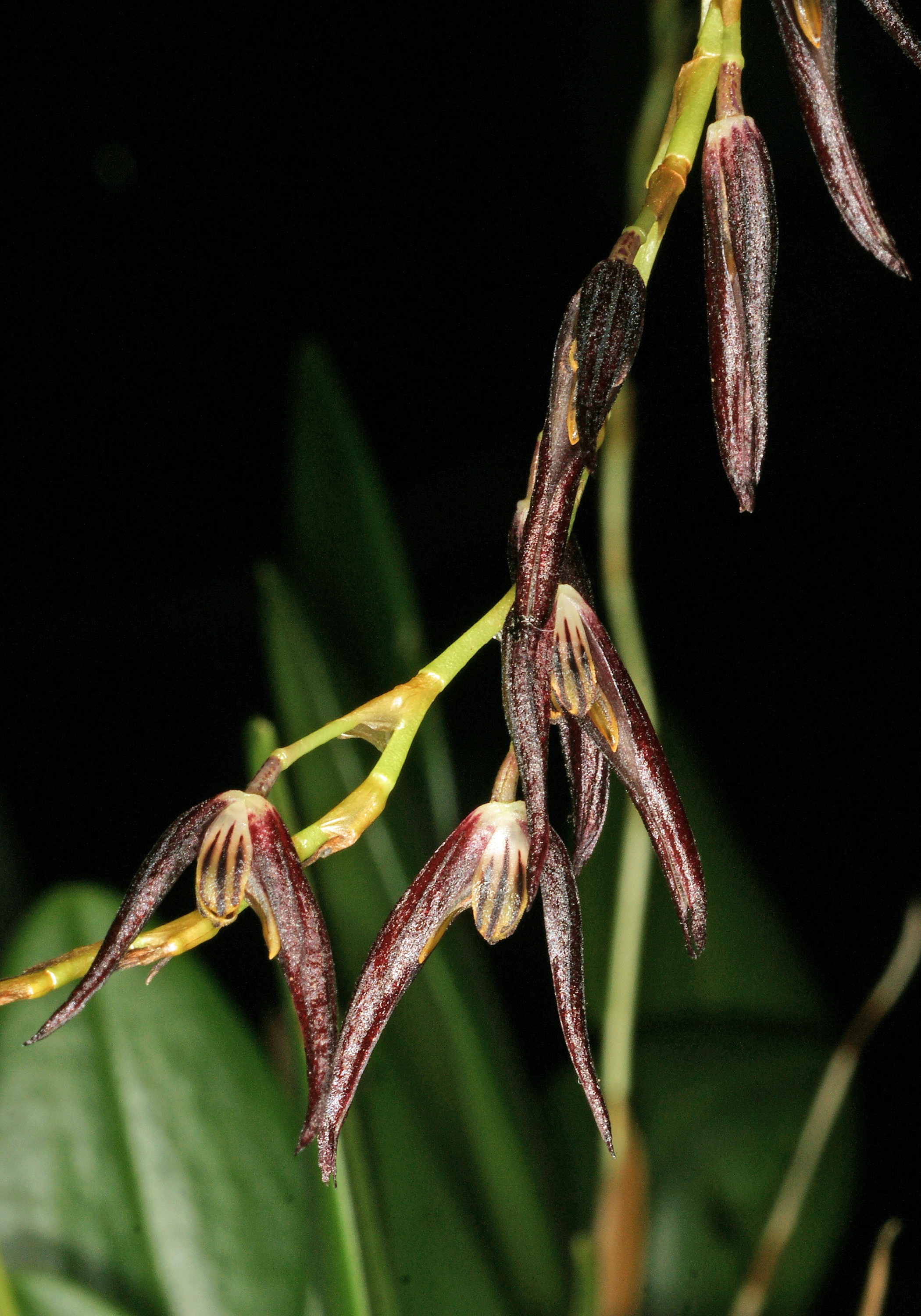

Scientific classification
- Kingdom: Plantae
- Clade: Tracheophytes
- Clade: Angiosperms
- Clade: Monocots
- Order: Asparagales
- Family: Orchidaceae
- Subfamily: Epidendroideae
- Genus: Stelis
- Species: S. megachlamys

Binomial name
- Stelis megachlamys (Schltr.) Pupulin

Synonyms
- Dracontia tuerckheimii (Schltr.) Luer; Pleurothallis megachlamys Schltr.; Pleurothallis tuerckheimii Schltr.; Stelis megachlamys subsp. teotepecensis Soto Arenas; Stelis tuerckheimii (Schltr.) Pridgeon & M.W.Chase

= Stelis megachlamys =

Species of plant

Stelis megachlamys is a species of orchid plant native to Guatemala, Belize, Costa Rica, Panama, and Mexico.
