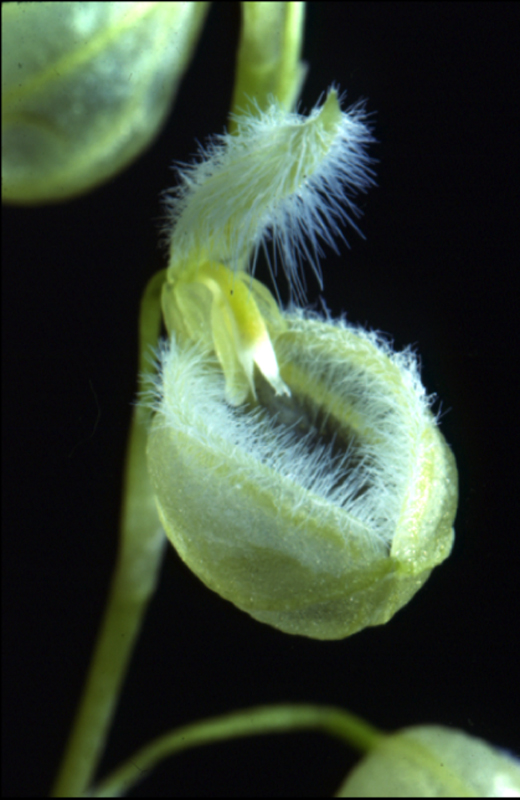

Scientific classification
- Kingdom: Plantae
- Clade: Tracheophytes
- Clade: Angiosperms
- Clade: Monocots
- Order: Asparagales
- Family: Orchidaceae
- Subfamily: Epidendroideae
- Genus: Stelis
- Species: S. pilosa

Binomial name
- Stelis pilosa Pridgeon & M. W. Chase

= Stelis pilosa =

Species of plant

Stelis pilosa is a species of epiphytic orchid native to Costa Rica and Panama.

== Description ==
It is a small orchid with an epiphytic habit, with thin ramicauls carrying a single leaf. It blooms with an inflorescence, 3 to 10 cm long, racemose, loosely with 6 to 8 flowers arising from a spathe at the base of the leaf. A characteristic of this species is that the flowers are white.

== Distribution ==
It is found in Panama and Costa Rica in low mountain humid forests at elevations of 1200 to 1800 meters.

== Taxonomy ==
It was described by Alec M. Pridgeon & Mark Wayne Chase, in: Lindleyana 17: 100. in 2002.
