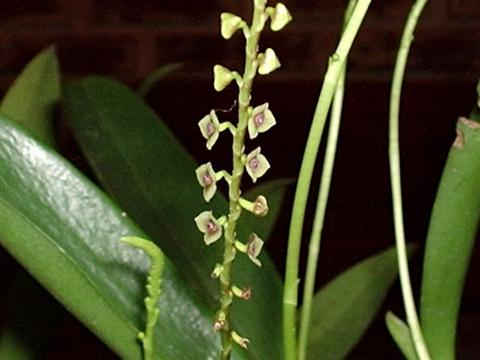

Scientific classification
- Kingdom: Plantae
- Clade: Tracheophytes
- Clade: Angiosperms
- Clade: Monocots
- Order: Asparagales
- Family: Orchidaceae
- Subfamily: Epidendroideae
- Genus: Stelis
- Species: S. gracilis

Binomial name
- Stelis gracilis Ames (1908)

Synonyms
- Stelis panamensis Schltr.

= Stelis gracilis =

Species of orchid

Stelis gracilis is a species of leach orchid (genus Stelis), which is one of the largest genera in the orchid family, with over 600 species. Stelis gracilis are small epiphytes with greenish-white flowers in raceme inflorescences. This rare species of orchid is found in tropical rainforests in North and Central America. It was first described by the American botanist Oakes Ames in 1908.

== Description ==
Stelis gracilis is a small-sized, warm growing epiphyte with erect to ascending, slender ramicauls enveloped basally by 2 to 3 dry and membranous sheaths and carrying a single apical, erect, subcoriaceous, oblanceolate, conduplicate blade attached to a petiolate base leaf. This species blooms in the spring and summer on a filiform, slender, 12 cm long, densely flowered, greenish-white raceme inflorescence. These flowers are photosensitive, only opening in the sunlight. The three symmetrically rounded sepals generally form a triangle with a small central structure, made up of the column, small petals and small lip.

Stems are up to 3 cm long; floral bracts around 1.5 mm. Florets are about 3 mm in size and have 0.6-0.8 mm long and 0.8 mm wide, inflated, greenish-white petals, oval and obtuse 3-nerved sepals (1.9-2.0 mm dorsal length and 1.0-2.0 mm width), and lip with a transverse thickening at the base. Florets have arched ovaries, which are 1.0 mm to 2.5 mm in length.

== Etymology ==
The generic name Stelis is the Greek word for "mistletoe." The term was coined by Theophrastus to describe a hemiparasitic plant that grows on trees. The name mistletoe originally referred to the species Viscum album (European mistletoe, of the family Santalaceae in the order Santalales). Over the centuries, the term has been broadened to include many other species of parasitic plants with similar habits, found in other parts of the world, that are classified in different genera and even families—such as Misodendraceae and the Loranthaceae. Orchids do not belong to these families, but, however, the genus Stelis was named for its resemblance to mistletoes.

== Distribution and habitat ==
These plants are rare; mostly found in North and Central American areas.

Found in countries such as Mexico, Belize, Guatemala, Honduras, Nicaragua, Costa Rica and Panama in dense, wet tropical forests at elevations around 1050 to 1100 meters.

== Cultivation ==
Stelis gracilis can be grown potted in a fine bark-based compost in cool to intermediate temperatures, moderate to heavy shade. Requires good ventilation and high humidity throughout the entire year.

If properly cared for in artificial conditions, an individual specimen may live for several years.

This genus is not common in cultivation.

== See also ==
- Charles Plumier
- Oakes Ames
