= Stelis cuencana =

Scientific classification
- Kingdom: Plantae
- Clade: Tracheophytes
- Clade: Angiosperms
- Clade: Monocots
- Order: Asparagales
- Family: Orchidaceae
- Subfamily: Epidendroideae
- Genus: Stelis
- Species: S. cuencana

Binomial name
- Stelis cuencana Schltr.

Synonyms
- Stelis excavata Luer & Hirtz

Species of plant

Stelis cuencana is a species of flowering plant in the family Orchidaceae, native to Ecuador.
