= Stelis piestopus =

Scientific classification
- Kingdom: Plantae
- Clade: Tracheophytes
- Clade: Angiosperms
- Clade: Monocots
- Order: Asparagales
- Family: Orchidaceae
- Subfamily: Epidendroideae
- Genus: Stelis
- Species: S. piestopus

Binomial name
- Stelis piestopus Schltr.

Species of plant

Stelis piestopus is a species of flowering plant in the family Orchidaceae, native to Peru. It was first described by Rudolf Schlechter in 1921.
