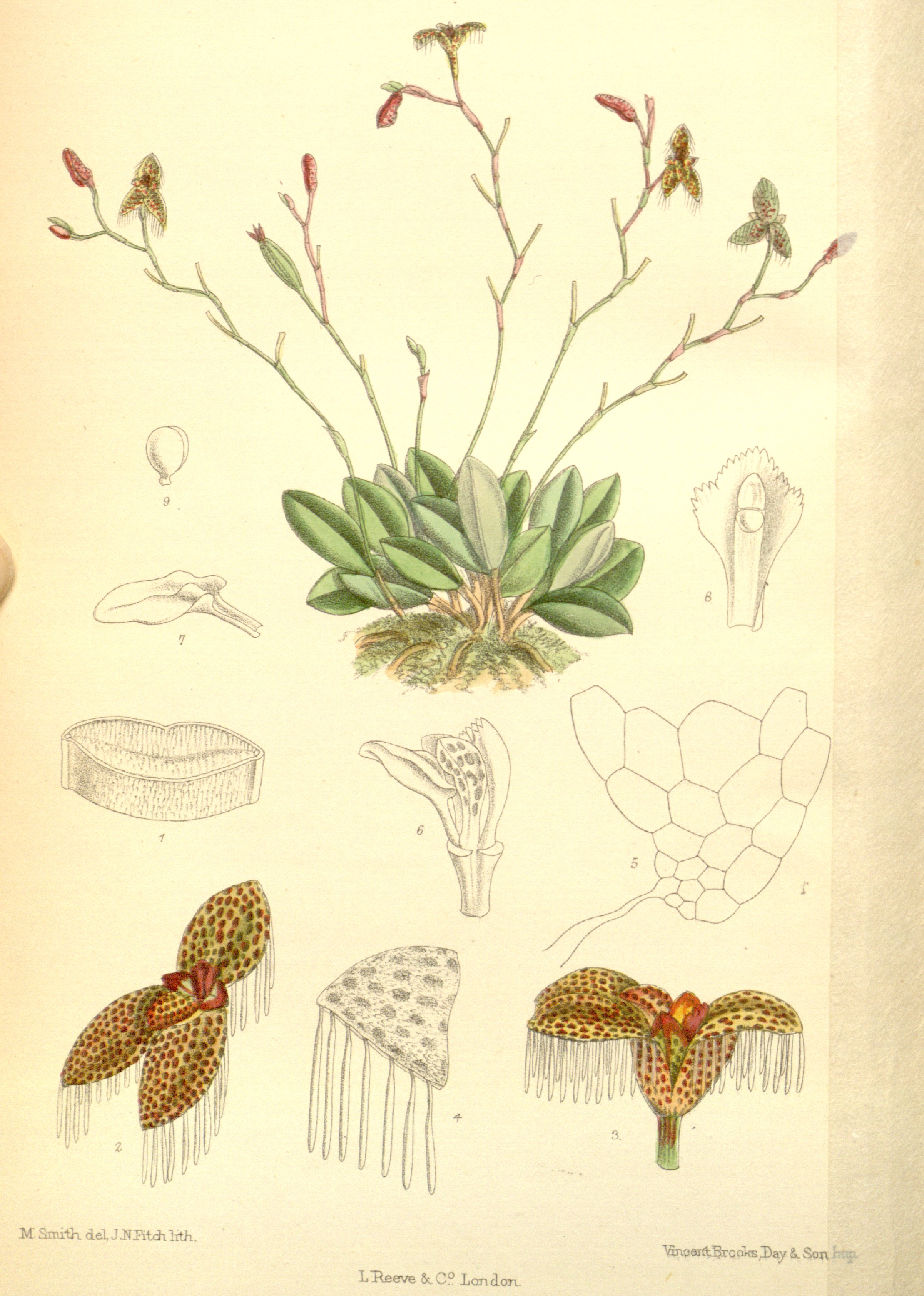
- Stelis ornata illustration

Scientific classification
- Kingdom: Plantae
- Clade: Tracheophytes
- Clade: Angiosperms
- Clade: Monocots
- Order: Asparagales
- Family: Orchidaceae
- Subfamily: Epidendroideae
- Genus: Stelis
- Species: S. ornata

Binomial name
- Stelis ornata (Rchb.f.) Pridgeon & M.W.Chase

Synonyms
- Pleurothallis ornata Rchb.f.; Pleurothallis schiedei Rchb.f.; Specklinia ornata (Rchb.f.) Luer

= Stelis ornata =

Species of orchid

Stelis ornata is a species of orchid found from Mexico through Guatemala and El Salvador as a miniature epiphyte at elevations of 1500 to 2500 meters above sea level. The plant is characterized by erect ramicauls enveloped by two basal sheaths and carrying a single apical, erect, coriaceous leaf where it blooms on an apical, single successive flowered, 2 inch [4 to 5 cm] long, fractiflex inflorescence that holds the successive opening, single flowers amid or just above the leaves occurring at any time of the year. In cultivation it prefers cool temperatures, shade, and high humidity as well as mounting on tree fern, and good air movement.
