= Stelis superbiens =

Scientific classification
- Kingdom: Plantae
- Clade: Tracheophytes
- Clade: Angiosperms
- Clade: Monocots
- Order: Asparagales
- Family: Orchidaceae
- Subfamily: Epidendroideae
- Genus: Stelis
- Species: S. superbiens

Binomial name
- Stelis superbiens Lindl.

Species of orchid

Stelis superbiens is an orchid of the genus Stelis.

It has stems with ½-inch, triangular, two-toned red flowers that have shiny backs, arranged alternately on straight stems. The plant grows to 6- to 8-inches and blooms several times a year when mature.
