= Stelis scabrida =

Scientific classification
- Kingdom: Plantae
- Clade: Tracheophytes
- Clade: Angiosperms
- Clade: Monocots
- Order: Asparagales
- Family: Orchidaceae
- Subfamily: Epidendroideae
- Genus: Stelis
- Species: S. scabrida

Binomial name
- Stelis scabrida Lindl.

Species of plant

Stelis scabrida is a species of flowering plant in the family Orchidaceae, native to the Leeward Islands and the Windward Islands. It was first described by John Lindley in 1840.
