= Stelis uncinata =

Scientific classification
- Kingdom: Plantae
- Clade: Tracheophytes
- Clade: Angiosperms
- Clade: Monocots
- Order: Asparagales
- Family: Orchidaceae
- Subfamily: Epidendroideae
- Genus: Stelis
- Species: S. uncinata

Binomial name
- Stelis uncinata Pridgeon & M.W.Chase

Synonyms
- Pleurothallis kareniae Luer

Species of orchid

Stelis uncinata is a species of orchid plant and is native to Costa Rica.
