= Stelis wagneri =

Scientific classification
- Kingdom: Plantae
- Clade: Tracheophytes
- Clade: Angiosperms
- Clade: Monocots
- Order: Asparagales
- Family: Orchidaceae
- Subfamily: Epidendroideae
- Genus: Stelis
- Species: S. wagneri

Binomial name
- Stelis wagneri (Schltr.) Pridgeon & M.W.Chase

Synonyms
- Pleurothallis wagneri Schltr.

Species of plant

Stelis wagneri is a species of orchid plant native to Panama.
