= Stelis bevilacquana =

Scientific classification
- Kingdom: Plantae
- Clade: Tracheophytes
- Clade: Angiosperms
- Clade: Monocots
- Order: Asparagales
- Family: Orchidaceae
- Subfamily: Epidendroideae
- Genus: Stelis
- Species: S. bevilacquana

Binomial name
- Stelis bevilacquana (Carnevali & I.Ramírez) Karremans

Synonyms
- Pleurothallis bevilacquana Carnevali & I.Ramírez

Species of orchid

Stelis bevilacquana is a species of orchid plant native to Venezuela.

Found in Tachira state of Venezuela in tall cloud forests at elevations around 2000 meters as a mini-miniature sized, cool to cold growing, caespitose epiphyte.
