= Stelis weddelliana =

Scientific classification
- Kingdom: Plantae
- Clade: Tracheophytes
- Clade: Angiosperms
- Clade: Monocots
- Order: Asparagales
- Family: Orchidaceae
- Subfamily: Epidendroideae
- Genus: Stelis
- Species: S. weddelliana

Binomial name
- Stelis weddelliana (Rchb.f.) Pridgeon & M.W.Chase

Synonyms
- Pleurothallis weddelliana Rchb.f.

Species of plant

Stelis weddelliana is a species of orchid plant native to Bolivia.
