= Stelis canae =

Scientific classification
- Kingdom: Plantae
- Clade: Tracheophytes
- Clade: Angiosperms
- Clade: Monocots
- Order: Asparagales
- Family: Orchidaceae
- Subfamily: Epidendroideae
- Genus: Stelis
- Species: S. canae

Binomial name
- Stelis canae (Ames) Pridgeon & M.W.Chase

Synonyms
- Pleurothallis canae Ames

Species of plant

Stelis canae is a species of orchid plant native to Panama.
