= Stelis trulla =

Scientific classification
- Kingdom: Plantae
- Clade: Tracheophytes
- Clade: Angiosperms
- Clade: Monocots
- Order: Asparagales
- Family: Orchidaceae
- Subfamily: Epidendroideae
- Genus: Stelis
- Species: S. trulla

Binomial name
- Stelis trulla (Rchb.f. & Warsz.) Pridgeon & M.W.Chase

Synonyms
- Pleurothallis trulla Rchb.f. & Warsz.

Species of plant

Stelis trulla is a species of orchid plant native to Peru.
