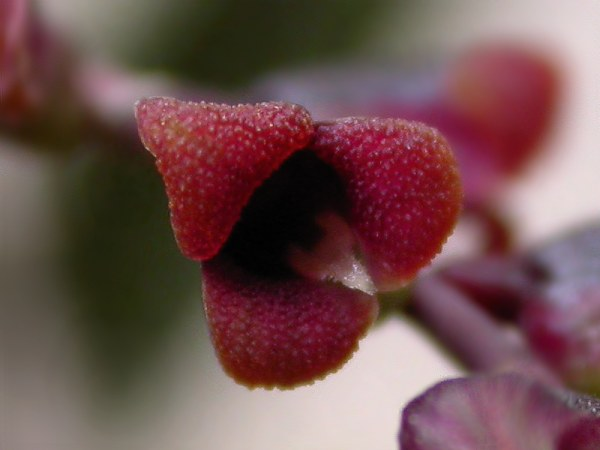

Scientific classification
- Kingdom: Plantae
- Clade: Tracheophytes
- Clade: Angiosperms
- Clade: Monocots
- Order: Asparagales
- Family: Orchidaceae
- Subfamily: Epidendroideae
- Genus: Stelis
- Species: S. amoena

Binomial name
- Stelis amoena Pridgeon & M.W.Chase

Synonyms
- Acianthera parahybunensis (Barb.Rodr.) Luer; Lepanthes parahybunensis Barb.Rodr.; Physosiphon parahybunensis (Barb.Rodr.) Cogn.; Pleurothallis parahybunensis (Barb.Rodr.) Luer; Stelis parahybunensis (Barb.Rodr.) Pridgeon & M.W.Chase

= Stelis amoena =

Species of orchid

Stelis amoena, synonym Acianthera parahybunensis, is a species of orchid, native to Southeast Brazil.
