= Stelis ancistra =

Scientific classification
- Kingdom: Plantae
- Clade: Tracheophytes
- Clade: Angiosperms
- Clade: Monocots
- Order: Asparagales
- Family: Orchidaceae
- Subfamily: Epidendroideae
- Genus: Stelis
- Species: S. ancistra

Binomial name
- Stelis ancistra (Luer & Hirtz) Pridgeon & M.W.Chase

Synonyms
- Pleurothallis ancistra Luer & Hirtz

Species of plant

Stelis ancistra is a species of orchid plant native to Colombia, Ecuador.
