= Stelis avirostris =

Scientific classification
- Kingdom: Plantae
- Clade: Tracheophytes
- Clade: Angiosperms
- Clade: Monocots
- Order: Asparagales
- Family: Orchidaceae
- Subfamily: Epidendroideae
- Genus: Stelis
- Species: S. avirostris

Binomial name
- Stelis avirostris (Luer & Hirtz) Pridgeon & M.W.Chase

Synonyms
- Pleurothallis avirostris Luer & Hirtz

Species of orchid

Stelis avirostris is a species of orchid plant native to Ecuador.
