= Stelis bracteosa =

Scientific classification
- Kingdom: Plantae
- Clade: Tracheophytes
- Clade: Angiosperms
- Clade: Monocots
- Order: Asparagales
- Family: Orchidaceae
- Subfamily: Epidendroideae
- Genus: Stelis
- Species: S. bracteosa

Binomial name
- Stelis bracteosa (C.Schweinf.) Pridgeon & M.W.Chase

Synonyms
- Pleurothallis bracteosa C.Schweinf.

Species of plant

Stelis bracteosa is a species of a mini-miniature orchid plant native to Peru. This species of orchid is found at elevation of 1050 meters. It can be found in Panama, Nicaragua, and Costa Rica. It has been described as having apical leaves that are obtuse and narrow. The flowers bloom in the fall. The flowers are flowered inflorescence with ovate floral bracts.
