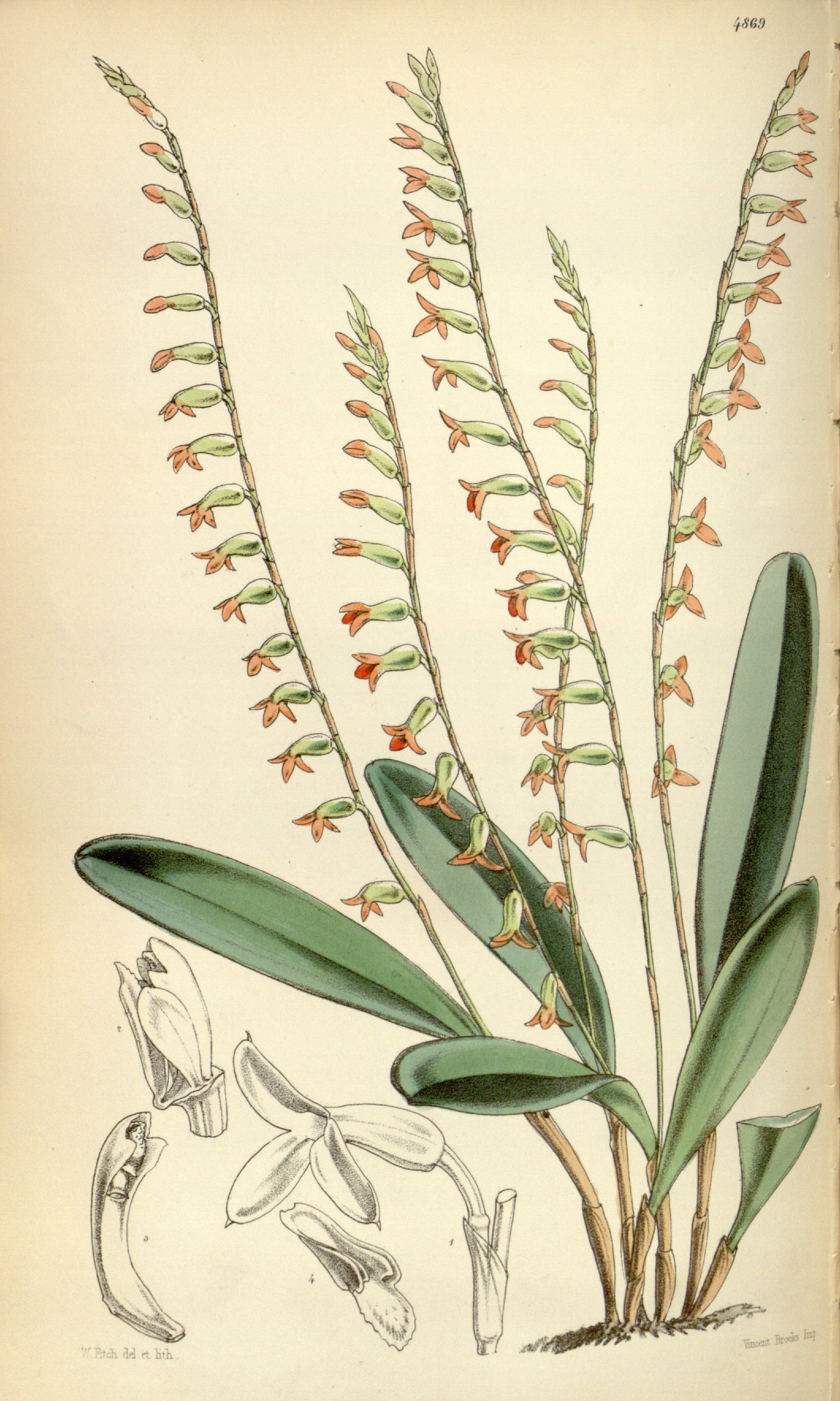

Scientific classification
- Kingdom: Plantae
- Clade: Tracheophytes
- Clade: Angiosperms
- Clade: Monocots
- Order: Asparagales
- Family: Orchidaceae
- Subfamily: Epidendroideae
- Genus: Stelis
- Species: S. emarginata

Binomial name
- Stelis emarginata (Lindl.) Soto Arenas & Solano

Synonyms
- Pleurothallis tubata (G.Lodd.) Steud.; Stelis tubata (G.Lodd.) Luer

= Stelis emarginata =

Species of plant

Stelis emarginata is a species of orchid plant and is native to Colombia, El Salvador, Guatemala, Honduras, Mexico, Nicaragua, Peru.
