= Stelis amaliae =

Scientific classification
- Kingdom: Plantae
- Clade: Tracheophytes
- Clade: Angiosperms
- Clade: Monocots
- Order: Asparagales
- Family: Orchidaceae
- Subfamily: Epidendroideae
- Genus: Stelis
- Species: S. amaliae

Binomial name
- Stelis amaliae (Luer & R.Escobar) Pridgeon & M.W.Chase

Synonyms
- Pleurothallis amaliae Luer & R.Escobar

Species of plant

Stelis amaliae is a species of orchid plant native to Colombia.
