= Stelis aligera =

Scientific classification
- Kingdom: Plantae
- Clade: Tracheophytes
- Clade: Angiosperms
- Clade: Monocots
- Order: Asparagales
- Family: Orchidaceae
- Subfamily: Epidendroideae
- Genus: Stelis
- Species: S. aligera

Binomial name
- Stelis aligera (Luer & R.Vásquez) Pridgeon & M.W.Chase

Synonyms
- Pleurothallis aligera Luer & R.Vásquez

Species of plant

Stelis aligera is a species of orchid plant native to Bolivia.
