= Stelis oscargrouchii =

Conservation status
- CITES Appendix II

Scientific classification
- Kingdom: Plantae
- Clade: Tracheophytes
- Clade: Angiosperms
- Clade: Monocots
- Order: Asparagales
- Family: Orchidaceae
- Subfamily: Epidendroideae
- Genus: Stelis
- Species: S. oscargrouchii

Binomial name
- Stelis oscargrouchii Karremans

Synonyms
- Specklinia ximenae Luer; Effusiella ximenae (Luer) Luer; Pleurothallis ximenae Luer

Species of flowering plant

Stelis oscargrouchii is a species of flowering plant in the family Orchidaceae. It is an epiphyte native to Ecuador. The species was named after Oscar the Grouch in 2015.

== Taxonomy and etymology ==
Stelis oscargrouchii was originally named Pleurothallis ximenae by Carlyle A. Luer and Alexander Charles Hirtz in 2004. Simultaneously, Luer published the species as Specklinia ximenae, leaving both names invalid. In 2015, Adam Philip Karremans transferred the species to Stelis. As the name Stelis ximenae was already in use, the species was given the new specific epithet oscargrouchii.

The name refers to Oscar the Grouch, as the green, fuzzy flowers reminded Karremans of the character.

== Distribution ==
Stelis oscargrouchii is native to the wet tropical biome of Morona-Santiago Province, Ecuador.

== Description ==
Stelis oscargrouchii is an epiphyte.

== Conservation ==
Stelis oscargrouchii is listed in Appendix II of CITES. There are no quotas or suspensions in place for the species.
