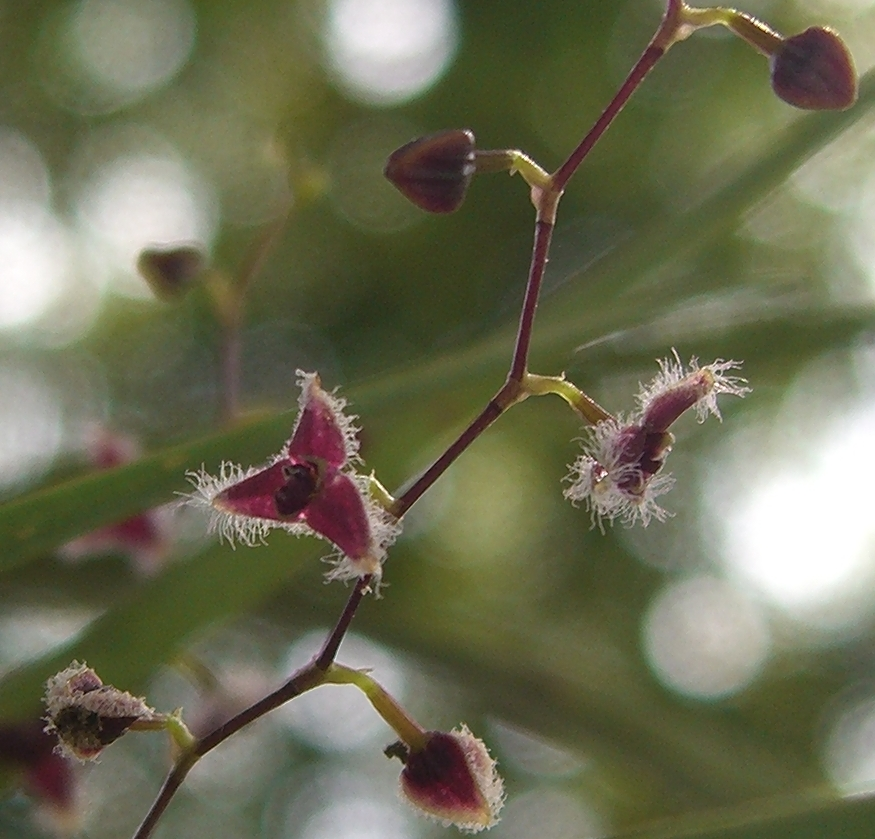
- Inflorescence

Scientific classification
- Kingdom: Plantae
- Clade: Tracheophytes
- Clade: Angiosperms
- Clade: Monocots
- Order: Asparagales
- Family: Orchidaceae
- Subfamily: Epidendroideae
- Genus: Stelis
- Species: S. tricardium

Binomial name
- Stelis tricardium Lindl.

= Stelis tricardium =

Species of orchid

Stelis tricardium is a species of orchid native to Ecuador.
