= Stelis stergiosii =

Scientific classification
- Kingdom: Plantae
- Clade: Tracheophytes
- Clade: Angiosperms
- Clade: Monocots
- Order: Asparagales
- Family: Orchidaceae
- Subfamily: Epidendroideae
- Genus: Stelis
- Species: S. stergiosii

Binomial name
- Stelis stergiosii (Carnevali & I.Ramírez) Karremans

Synonyms
- Pleurothallis stergiosii Carnevali & I.Ramírez

Species of plant

Stelis stergiosii is a species of orchid plant native to Venezuela.
