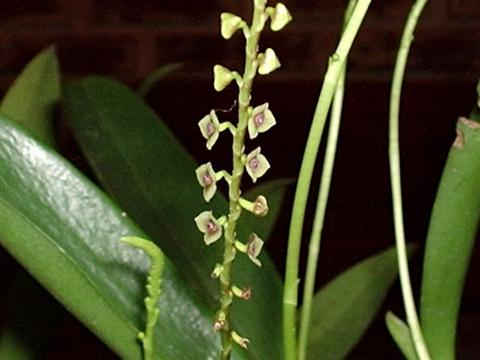

Scientific classification
- Kingdom: Plantae
- Clade: Tracheophytes
- Clade: Angiosperms
- Clade: Monocots
- Order: Asparagales
- Family: Orchidaceae
- Subfamily: Epidendroideae
- Genus: Stelis
- Species: S. argentata

Binomial name
- Stelis argentata Lindl.

Synonyms
- Stelis heylidyana H.Focke; Stelis endresii Rchb.f.; Stelis littoralis Barb.Rodr.; Stelis yauaperyensis Barb.Rodr.; Stelis vulcanica Schltr.; Stelis bernoullii Schltr.; Stelis parvibracteata Ames; Stelis violascens Schltr.; Stelis praesecta Schltr.; Stelis glandulosa Ames; Stelis huebneri Schltr.; Stelis pichinchae Dodson & Garay

= Stelis argentata =

Silvery stelis

Species of orchid

Stelis argentata, commonly known as the silvery stelis, is a species of orchid of the genus Stelis.

It is found in Central America. It has stems of 15 mm (1/2 in) flowers.
