= Stelis roseopunctata =

Scientific classification
- Kingdom: Plantae
- Clade: Tracheophytes
- Clade: Angiosperms
- Clade: Monocots
- Order: Asparagales
- Family: Orchidaceae
- Subfamily: Epidendroideae
- Genus: Stelis
- Species: S. roseopunctata

Binomial name
- Stelis roseopunctata (Lindl.) R.Bernal

Synonyms
- Crocodeilanthe elegans (Kunth) Luer; Dendrobium elegans Kunth; Humboltia elegans (Kunth) Kuntze; Humboltia roseopunctata (Lindl.) Kuntze; Pleurothallis elegans (Kunth) Lindl.; Pleurothallis roseopunctata Lindl.; Specklinia elegans (Kunth) Lindl.; Stelis elegans (Kunth) Pridgeon & M.W.Chase; Stelis picta Pridgeon & M.W.Chase

Species of plant

Stelis roseopunctata is a species of flowering plant in the family Orchidaceae, native to Colombia, Ecuador and Venezuela. It was first described by John Lindley in 1846 as Pleurothallis roseopunctata and transferred to Stelis by Rodrigo Bernal in 2015. Stelis elegans (Kunth) Pridgeon & M.W.Chase is a synonym of Stelis roseopunctata; Stelis elegans Luer & R.Vásquez is a separate species.
