= Pseudomonas brenneri =

Scientific classification
- Domain: Bacteria
- Kingdom: Pseudomonadati
- Phylum: Pseudomonadota
- Class: Gammaproteobacteria
- Order: Pseudomonadales
- Family: Pseudomonadaceae
- Genus: Pseudomonas
- Species: P. brenneri

Binomial name
- Pseudomonas brenneri Baïda, et al. 2001

Type strain
- CIP 106646 DSM 15294; JCM 13307

Species of bacterium

Pseudomonas brenneri is a Gram-negative, rod-shaped, fluorescent, motile bacterium with a single polar flagella isolated from natural mineral waters in France. Based on 16S rRNA analysis, P. brenneri falls within the P. fluorescens group.

Pseudomonas brenneri is named after the microbiologist DJ Brenner. P. brenneri was first isolated from a natural mineral water source in France. It is a gram-negative, rod-shaped (bacillus) bacterium that is motile via a flagellum. It is also an aerobic bacterium that requires oxygen and grows best at medium temperatures. On culture media, P. brenneri is able to produce a fluorescent pigment (pyoverdine) under the right conditions. Strains of this bacterium have been found in diverse environments like soil, wastewater, contaminated soil, and places that have cold, fresh water.
