= Stelis brenneri =

Scientific classification
- Kingdom: Plantae
- Clade: Tracheophytes
- Clade: Angiosperms
- Clade: Monocots
- Order: Asparagales
- Family: Orchidaceae
- Subfamily: Epidendroideae
- Genus: Stelis
- Species: S. brenneri

Binomial name
- Stelis brenneri (Luer) Karremans

Synonyms
- Effusiella brenneri (Luer) Luer; Pleurothallis brenneri Luer; Specklinia brenneri (Luer) Luer

Species of orchid

Stelis brenneri is a species of orchid described by Carlyle A. Luer and named for Joe Brenner, formerly of Puyo, Ecuador, who collected this species. Originally described as Pleurothallis brenneri, this species is common in several areas of southeastern Ecuador in relatively dry scrub forest at high altitudes.
