= Stelis elegans =

Scientific classification
- Kingdom: Plantae
- Clade: Tracheophytes
- Clade: Angiosperms
- Clade: Monocots
- Order: Asparagales
- Family: Orchidaceae
- Subfamily: Epidendroideae
- Genus: Stelis
- Species: S. elegans

Binomial name
- Stelis elegans Luer & R.Vásquez

Species of plant

Stelis elegans Luer & R.Vásquez is a species of flowering plant in the family Orchidaceae, native to Bolivia and Ecuador. It was first described in 1981. Stelis elegans (Kunth) Pridgeon & M.W.Chase is a synonym of Stelis roseopunctata.
