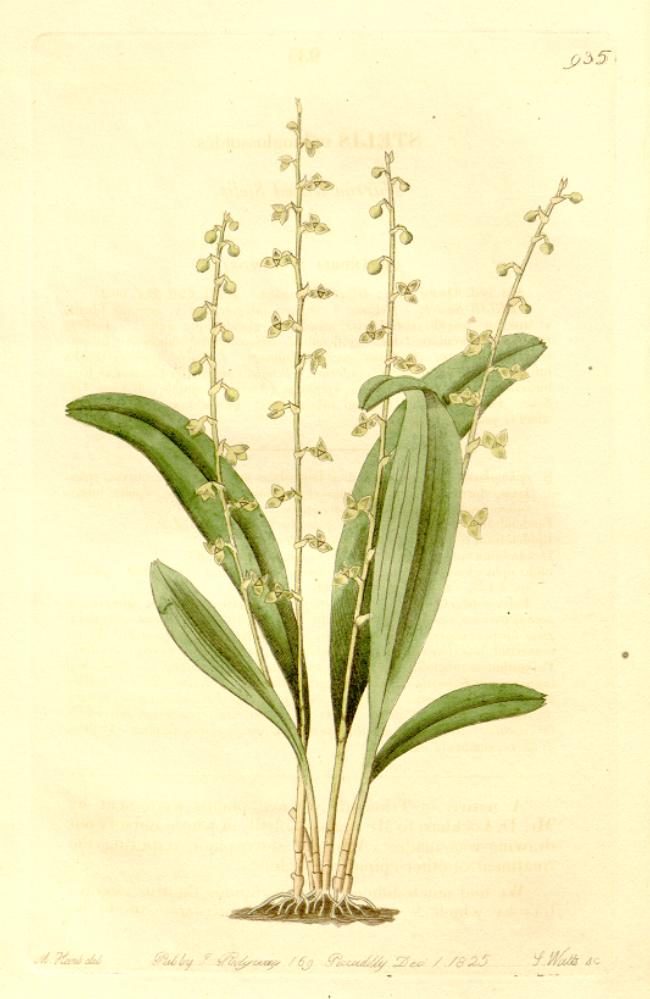
- Stelis ophioglossoides illustration

Scientific classification
- Kingdom: Plantae
- Clade: Tracheophytes
- Clade: Angiosperms
- Clade: Monocots
- Order: Asparagales
- Family: Orchidaceae
- Subfamily: Epidendroideae
- Genus: Stelis
- Species: S. ophioglossoides

Binomial name
- Stelis ophioglossoides (Jacq.) Sw.

Synonyms
- Dendrobium ophioglossoides (Jacq.) Sw.; Epidendrum ophioglossoides Jacq. (basionym); Epidendrum trigoniflorum Sw.; Pleurothallis ophioglossoides (Jacq.) Garay & H.R.Sweet; Stelis cristalensis H.Dietr.; Stelis toepfferiana Rchb.f.; Stelis trigoniflora (Sw.) Garay

= Stelis ophioglossoides =

Species of orchid

Stelis ophioglossoides is a species of orchid native to east Cuba, French Guiana, the Leeward Islands, Trinidad and Tobago, Venezuela, and the Windward Islands. It is the type species of the genus Stelis.
