= Stelis rodrigoi =

Scientific classification
- Kingdom: Plantae
- Clade: Tracheophytes
- Clade: Angiosperms
- Clade: Monocots
- Order: Asparagales
- Family: Orchidaceae
- Subfamily: Epidendroideae
- Tribe: Epidendreae
- Subtribe: Pleurothallidinae
- Genus: Stelis
- Species: S. rodrigoi

Binomial name
- Stelis rodrigoi (Luer) Pridgeon & M.W.Chase

Synonyms
- Condylago rodrigoi Luer

Species of plant

Stelis rodrigoi is a species of flowering plant in the family Orchidaceae, native to Colombia. It was first described by Carlyle A. Luer in 1982 as Condylago rodrigoi.

Stelis rodrigoi is found at altitudes ranging from 1,400 to 1,600 m (4,600 to 5,200 ft). It was named in honor of Rodrigo Escobar of Medellin, Colombia, who had successfully cultivated this species since its discovery.
