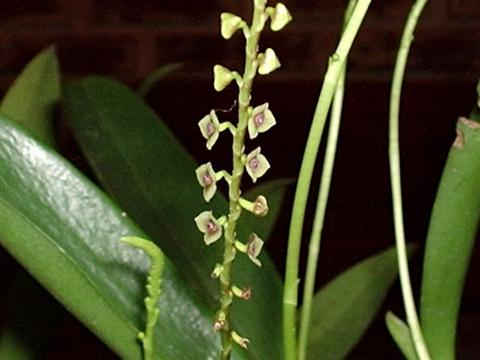
- Silvery stelis (Stelis argentata)

Scientific classification
- Kingdom: Plantae
- Clade: Embryophytes
- Clade: Tracheophytes
- Clade: Angiosperms
- Clade: Monocots
- Order: Asparagales
- Family: Orchidaceae
- Subfamily: Epidendroideae
- Tribe: Epidendreae
- Subtribe: Pleurothallidinae
- Genus: Stelis; Sw., 1799

Synonyms
- Humboltia Ruiz & Pav.; Physosiphon Lindl.; Dialissa Lindl.; Crocodeilanthe Rchb.f. & Warsz.; Pseudostelis Schltr.; Physothallis Garay; Steliopsis Brieger in F.R.R.Schlechter; Apatostelis Garay; Salpistele Dressler; Condylago Luer; Mystacorchis Szlach. & Marg.; Dracontia (Luer) Luer; Elongatia (Luer) Luer; Unciferia (Luer) Luer; Loddigesia Luer; Lomax Luer; Effusiella Luer; Niphantha Luer

= Stelis =

Leach orchid

Genus of orchids

Stelis, or leach orchids, are a large genus of orchids, with 1339 accepted species. The generic name Stelis is the Greek word for 'mistletoe', referring to the epiphytic habit of these species. These mainly epiphytic (rarely lithophytic) plants are widely distributed throughout much of South America, Central America, Mexico, the West Indies and Florida. Stelis is abbreviated Ste. in the horticultural trade.

Many of the older species were named by Lindley, Ruiz & Pavon and Reichenbach, while many of the recent species were named by Carlyle A. Luer. An orchid of the genus Stelis was probably the first American orchid ever to be brought to Europe. An herbarium specimen was depicted in 1591 in Tabernaemontanus' herbal book.

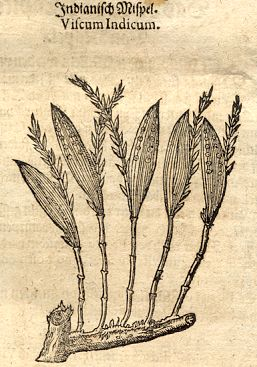
'Indian mistletoe' first depiction of a Stelis orchid pub 1625 in Herbal Book of Johannes Theodorus Tabernaemontanus

== Description ==
A single oblanceolate leaf develops from narrow, leathery outgrowths from a creeping stem.

Most species grow long, dense racemes of small to minute flower in diverse shades of white. Other colors are rare. These flowers are photosensitive, only opening in the sunlight. Some close completely at night.

The three symmetrically rounded sepals generally form a triangle with a small central structure, made up of the column, small petals and small lip, though slight variation to this theme does occur.

This genus is not common in cultivation.

== Taxonomy ==
Cladistic research (by A. Pridgeon, R. Solano and M. Chase) has shown that the genus Stelis is monophyletic. But the distinction with several Pleurothallis subgenera is blurred (see Reference).

They are closely related to the massive genus Pleurothallis and Masdevallia. Although vegetatively the species show much variety, the flowers show a basic uniformity and are very similar throughout. Apatostelis Garay, Dialissa Lindl., Humboldtia Ruiz & Pav. and Steliopsis Brieger are generally included into Stelis.

== History ==
The genus Stelis was discovered with Charles Plumier, a French priest and botanist who was sent by Louis XIV, King of France, to study the flora of the Antilles in around 1690. He collected numerous species in Dominica (Caribbean island) and other islands, and published his findings in a catalogue called Nova Plantarum Americanarum Genera in 1703. Later on, Nikolaus von Jacquin, a Dutch botanist who collected extensively in the Caribbean, published his findings in two separate works. In 1760, he published the first one called Enumeratio Systematica Plantarum quas in Insulis Caribeis, where he described the same plant as Plumier´s polynomial (Epidendrum ophioglossoides). In 1763, he published a more detailed second work called Selectarum Stirpium Americanarum Historia. Here, Jacquin describes a plant of his own herbarium with the same name (E. ophioglossoides)

Afterwards, on the "Expedición Botánica Española" (Spanish Botanic Expedition) sent by King Carlos III to study the flora of Peru and Chile, Hipolito Ruiz and Joseph Pavon complete results established 11 small plants of a new genus which they named Humboltia in honor of the renowned German explorer and naturalist Alexander Von Humboldt. In 1799, Olof Swartz, a Swedish botanist, studied the genus proposed by Ruiz and Pavon and found that it had been already used by Vahl to designate a Leguminosae. Because of this, he proposed the name Stelis in replacement of Humboltia. The species Epidendrum ophioglossoides was later moved to the genus Stelis by Swarz, and it is now the type species of the genus.

== Species ==
Select species of Stelis include:

- Stelis alata Lindl. – winged stelis
- Stelis argentata Lindl. – silvery stelis
- Stelis aviceps Lindl. – bird head stelis
- Stelis barbata Rolfe – bearded stelis
- Stelis bidentata Schltr – two-toothed stelis
- Stelis ciliaris Lindl. – hairy stelis
- Stelis crescentiicola Schltr – Crescentia living stelis
- Stelis dalstroemii Luer
- Stelis flexuosa – flexuous stelis
- Stelis gemma – gem stelis
- Stelis glomerosa – ball stelis
- Stelis guatemalensis – Guatemalan stelis
- Stelis intermedia Poepp. & Endl. – in-between stelis
- Stelis leinigii – Leinig's stelis
- Stelis megantha – giant anther stelis
- Stelis palmeiraensis – Palmeira stelis
- Stelis pauciflora Lindl.
- Stelis papaquerensis Rchb.f.
- Stelis perpusilliflora – West Indian leach orchid
- Stelis porschiana – Porsch's stelis
- Stelis purpurea – purple stelis
- Stelis pygmaea – pygmy leach orchid
- Stelis triangulisepala – triangular sepal stelis
