= Flora of Colombia =

Collective plants of Colombia

The Flora of Colombia is characterized by over 32,000 species of green plants.

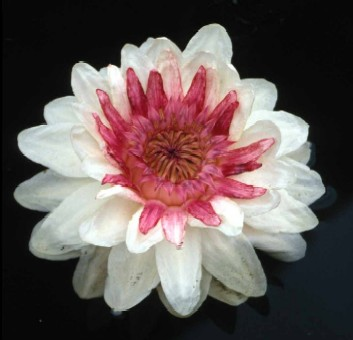
Victoria amazonica grows in the Amazon basin.

== National Flower of Colombia ==
The national flower of Colombia is the orchid Cattleya trianae which was named after the Colombian naturalist José Jerónimo Triana. The orchid was selected by botanist Emilio Robledo, in representation of the Colombian Academy of History to determine the most representative flowering plant of Colombia. He described it as one of the most beautiful flowers in the world and selected Cattleya trianae as National symbol.

== National Tree of Colombia ==
The national tree of Colombia is the palm Ceroxylon quindiuense (Quindío wax palm) which was named after the Colombian Department of Quindío where is located the Cocora valley, the only habitat of this restricted range species. The Quindío wax palm was selected as the national tree by the government of Belisario Betancur and was the first tree officially declared as a protected species in Colombia. C. quindiuense is the only palm that grows at such high altitudes in Colombia and is the tallest monocot in the world.

== Endemism ==
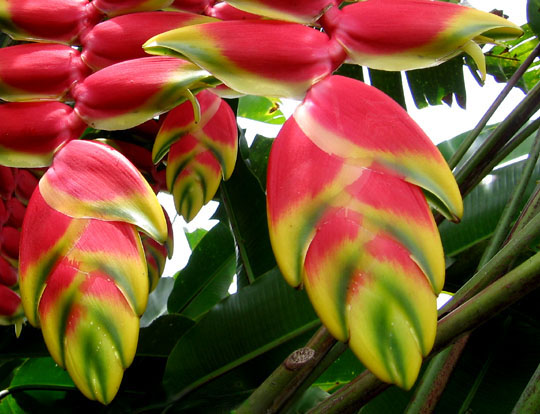
Colombia has the second largest number of heliconia species worldwide. Most of them are endemic species

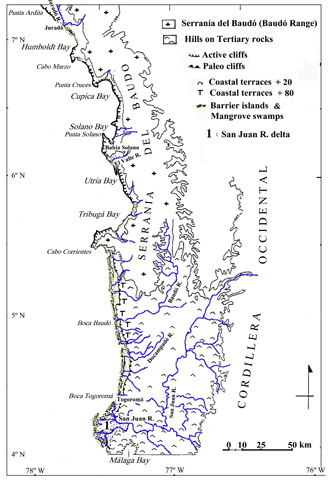
The Baudó Mountains in the Colombian pacific coast have many endemic plants.

Colombia has the largest number of endemic species (species that are not found naturally anywhere else) worldwide. About 10% of the species in the world live in Colombia. Some determinant factors in the distribution range of the species are the wide diversity of habitats available due to the variety of altitudes, weather conditions, temperatures, soils and sunlight on the coasts, in the Andes and in the rainforest lowlands.

Endemics can easily become endangered or extinct due to their restricted habitat and vulnerability to the actions of man, including the introduction of new organisms.

=== Ecoregions with high endemism ===
According to the Colombian Ministry of Environment, the following ecoregions have the highest percentage of botanic endemic species:

- Colombian Amazon basin
- Catatumbo River basin
- Mid Magdalena River basin
- Pacific coastal region

== Tree species ==
Many of the Colombian trees are endangered species due to the high quality of the woods and timber industry exploitation (such as Colombian oak Quercus humboldtidiana and Colombian mahogany) and as source of tanning substances for the leather industry (such as mangrove and Encenillo tree Weinmannia tomentosa). Some tree species described in Colombia are:

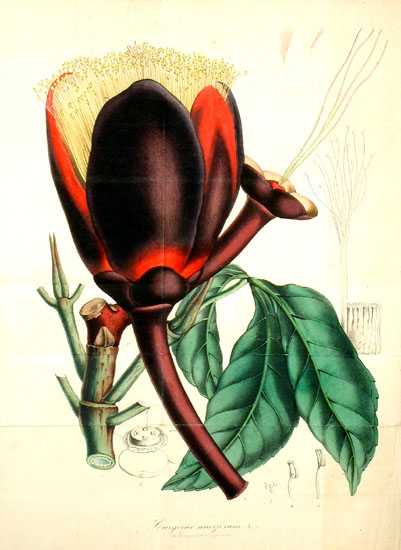
Pekea-nut tree (Caryocar nuciferum)

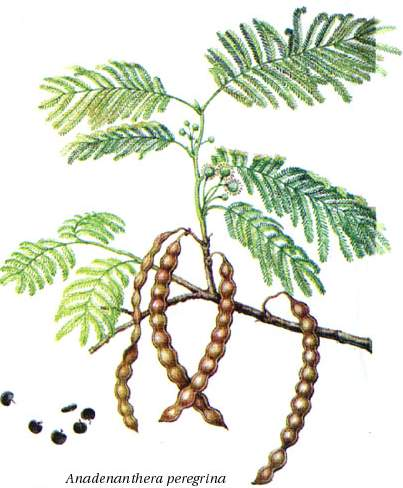
Yopo tree (Anadenanthera peregrina)

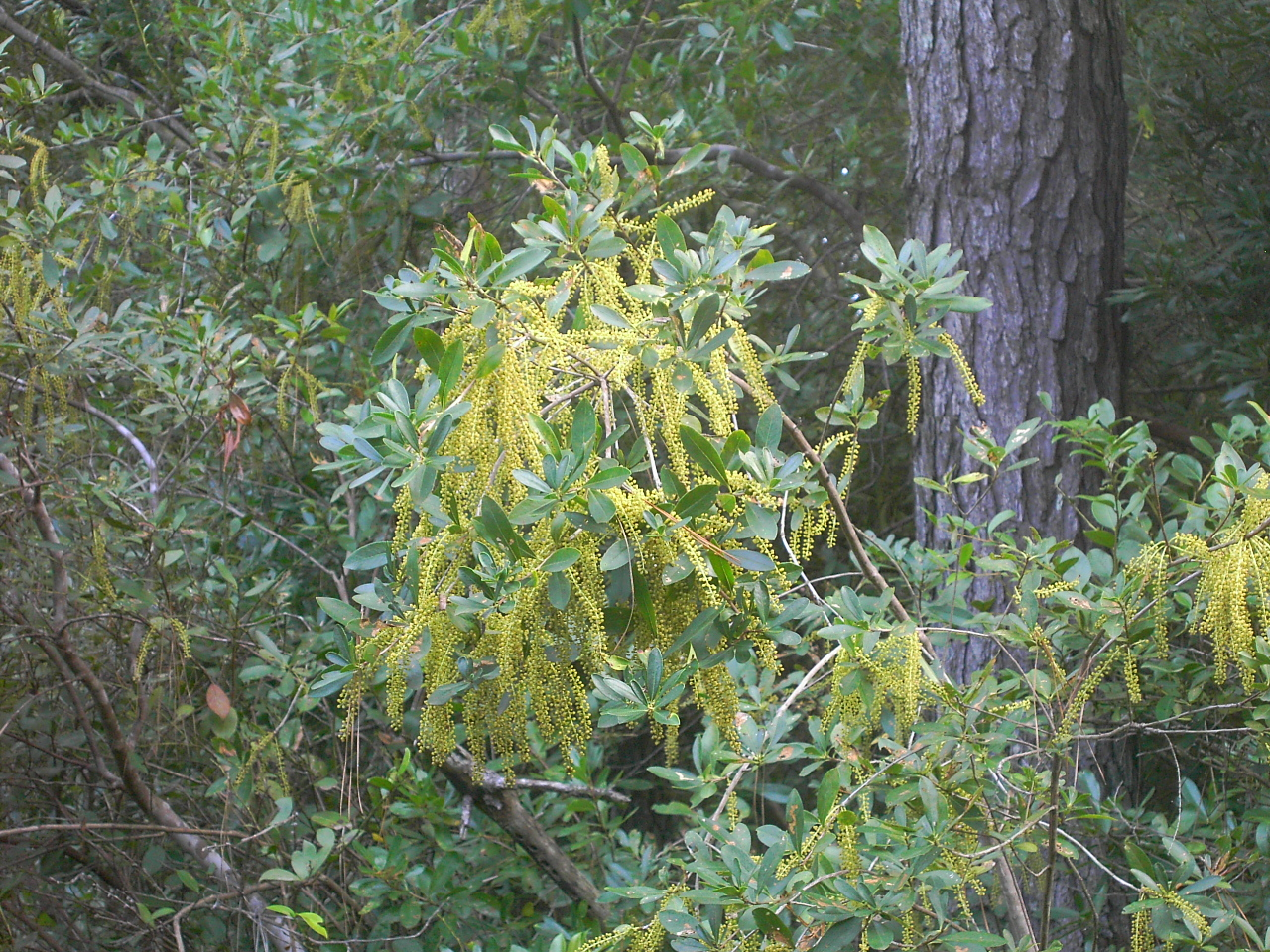
Cyrilla racemiflora

- Anadenanthera peregrina
- Amazon Grape
- Adenolisianthus arboreus
- Aiouea angulata
- Anthodiscus montanus
- Astrocaryum triandrum
- Attalea septuagenata
- Bactris coloniata
- Banara ibaguensis
- Blakea granatensis
- Bonnetia holostyla
- Bulnesia carrapo
- Brazil Nut
- Borojoa patinoi
- Caryocar nuciferum
- Caryodaphnopsis cogolloi
- Casearia megacarpa
- Coccothrinax argentata
- Cryosophila kalbreyeri
- Cyathea incana
- Cyrilla racemiflora
- Chelyocarpus dianeurus
- Cherimoya
- Dendropanax colombianus
- Esenbeckia alata
- Feijoa
- Guaiacum officinale
- Garcia nutans
- Graffenrieda grandifolia
- Hirtella enneandra
- Huberodendron patinoi
- Hampea thespesioides
- Henriettella goudotiana
- Humiriastrum melanocarpum
- Itaya amicorum
- Macrosamanea consanguinea
- Neosprucea sararensis
- Platonia insignis
- Quararibea asterolepis
- Quararibea cordata
- Ouratea tumacoensis
- Reinhardtia ssp.
- Ruehssia cundurango
- Simaba cedron
- Syagrus smithii
- Tessmannianthus quadridomius
- Trigonobalanus excelsa

== Fruits of Colombia ==
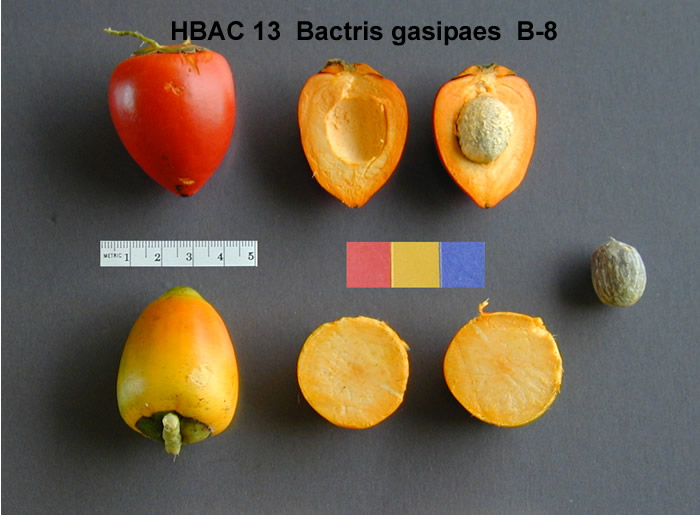
Chontaduro fruit (Bactris gasipaes)

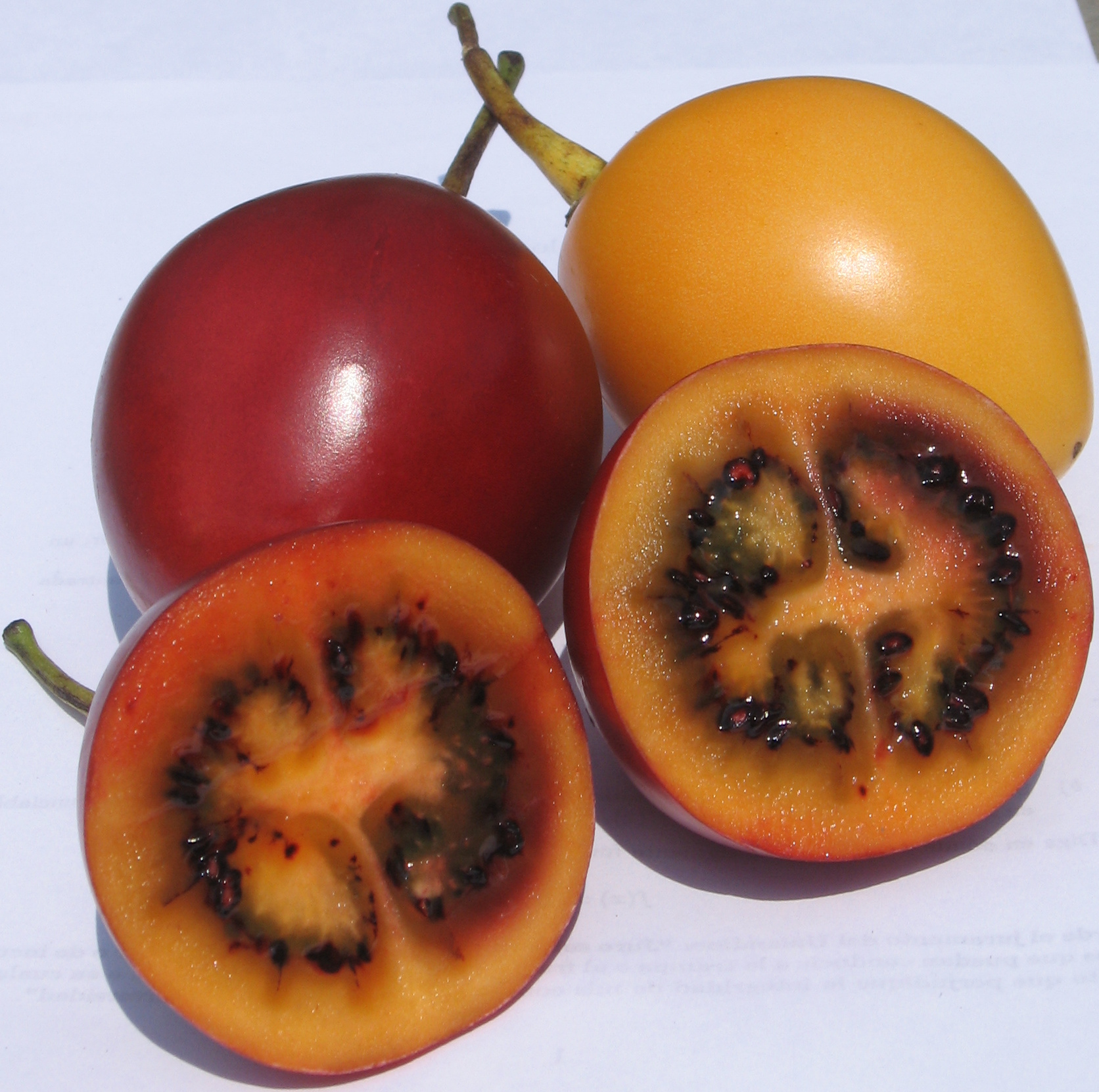
Tomato tree or tamarillo (Solanum betaceum)

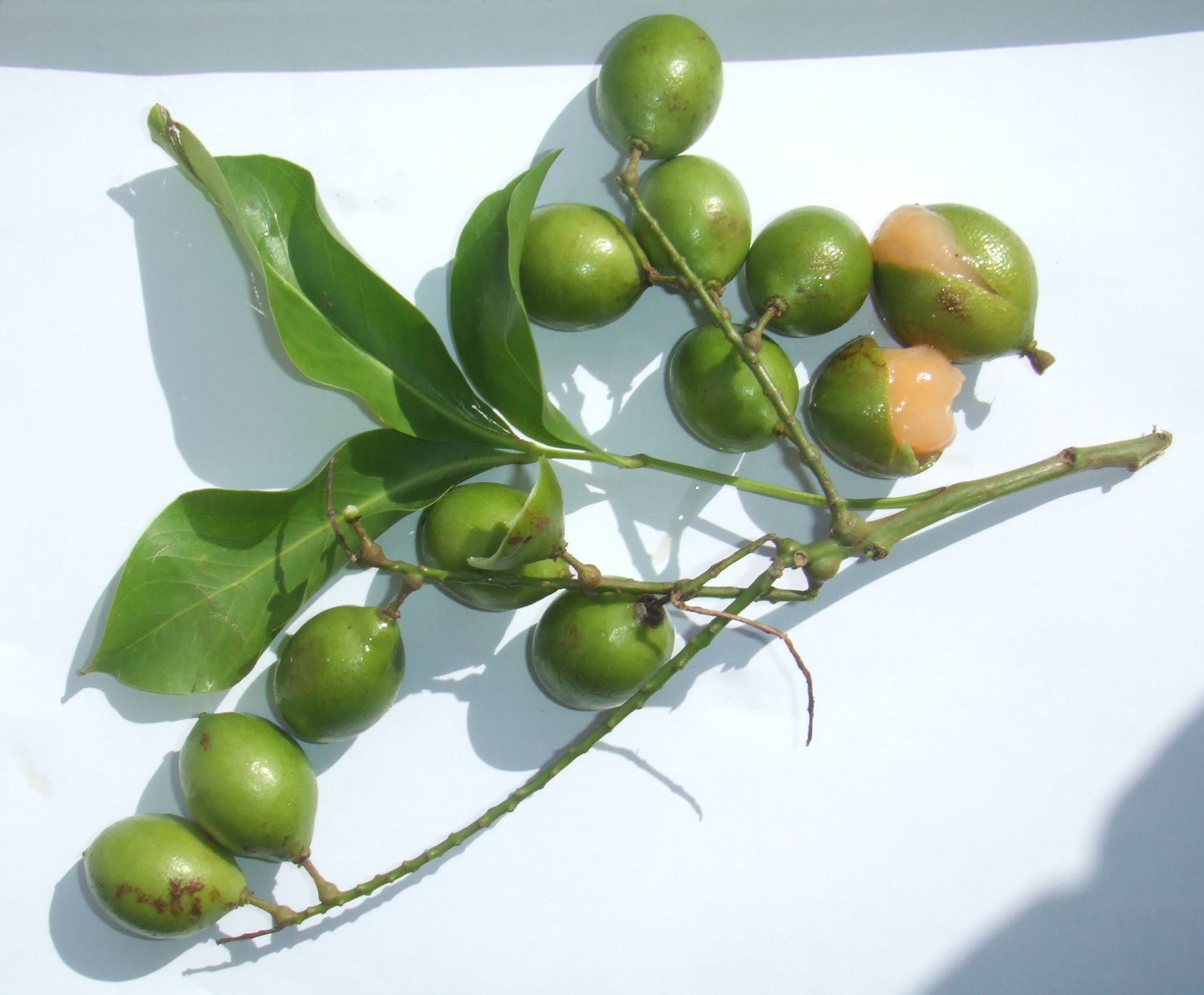
Mamoncillo (Melicoccus bijugatus)

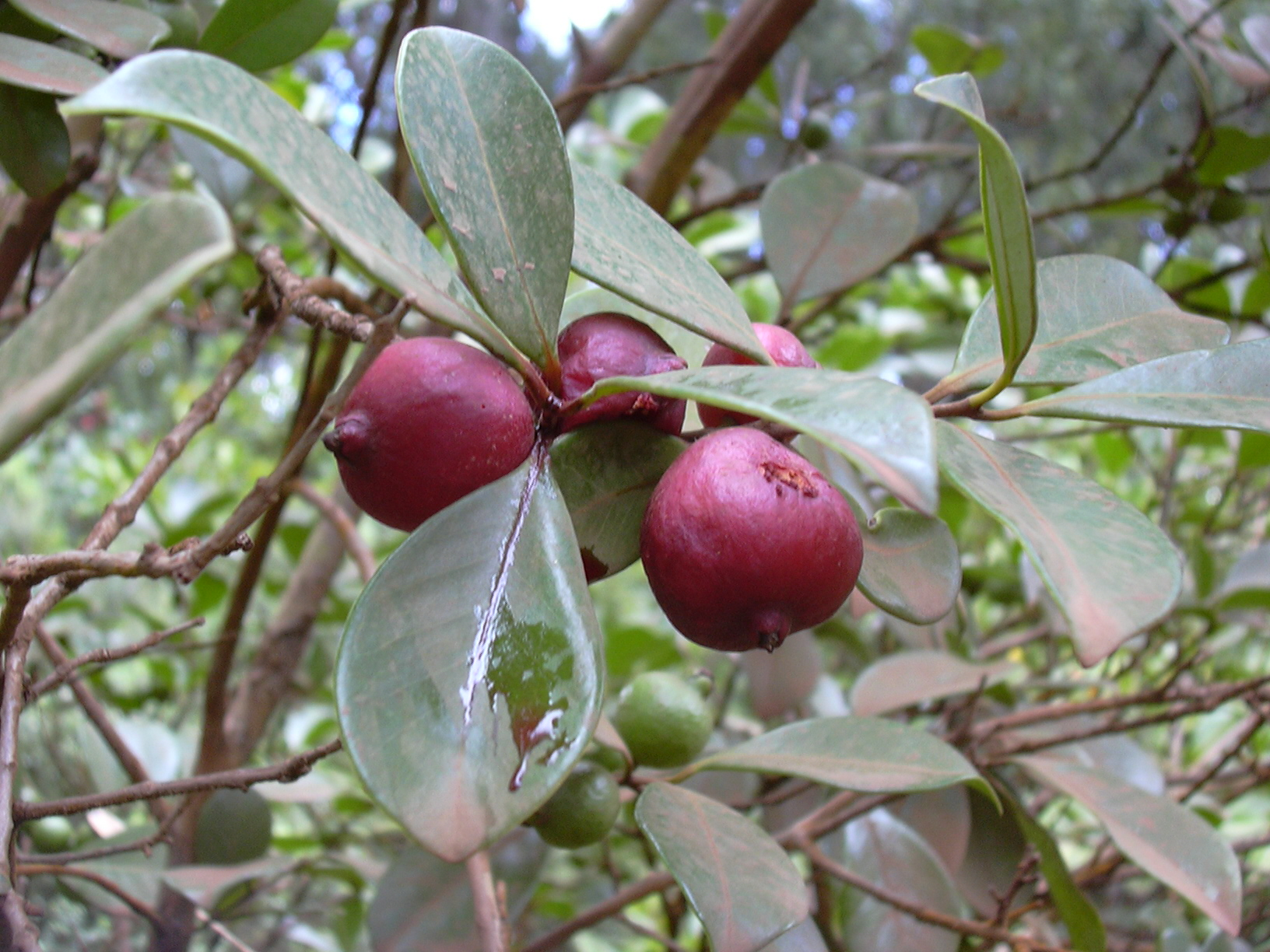
Arazá or Strawberry guava (Psidium cattleianum)

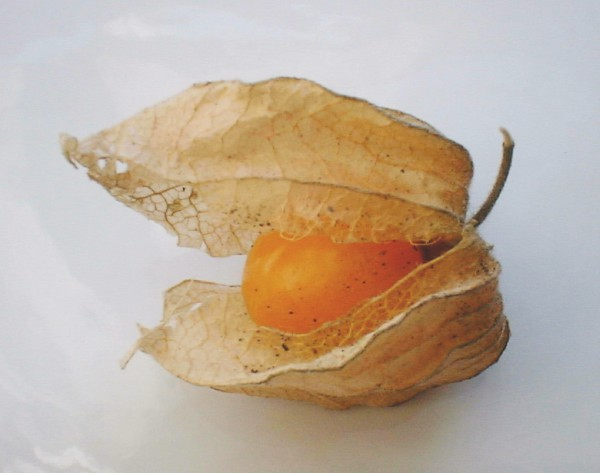
Uchuva or Cape gooseberry fruit (Physalis edulis)

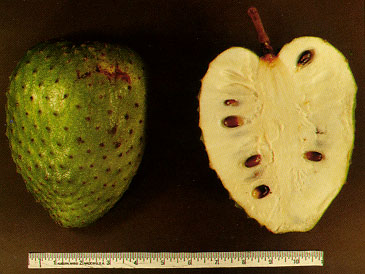
Guanabana or Soursop fruit (Annona muricata)

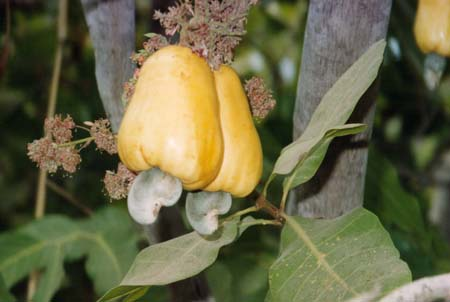
Marañon or Cashew (Anacardium occidentale)

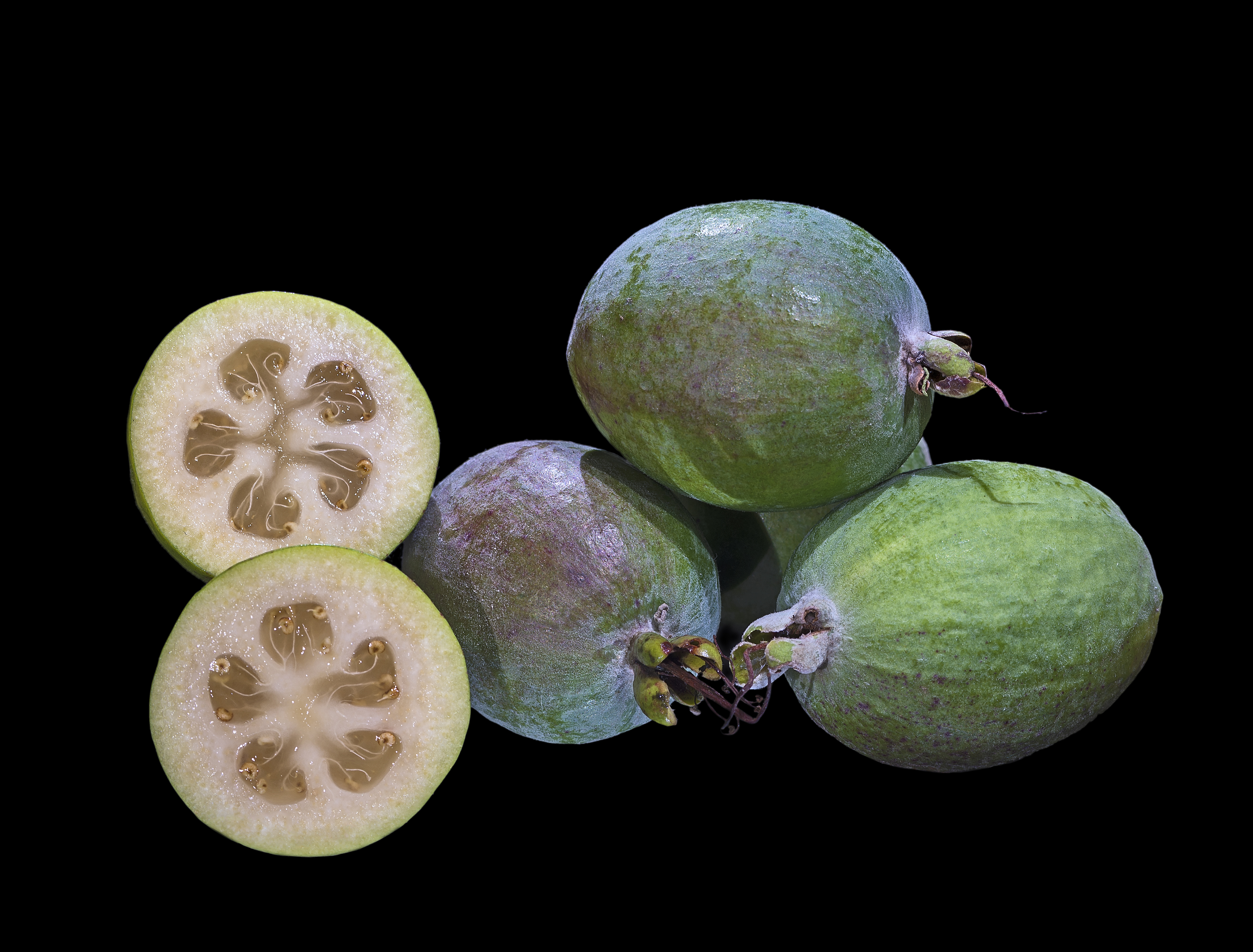
Feijoa or Pineapple guava (Feijoa sellowiana)

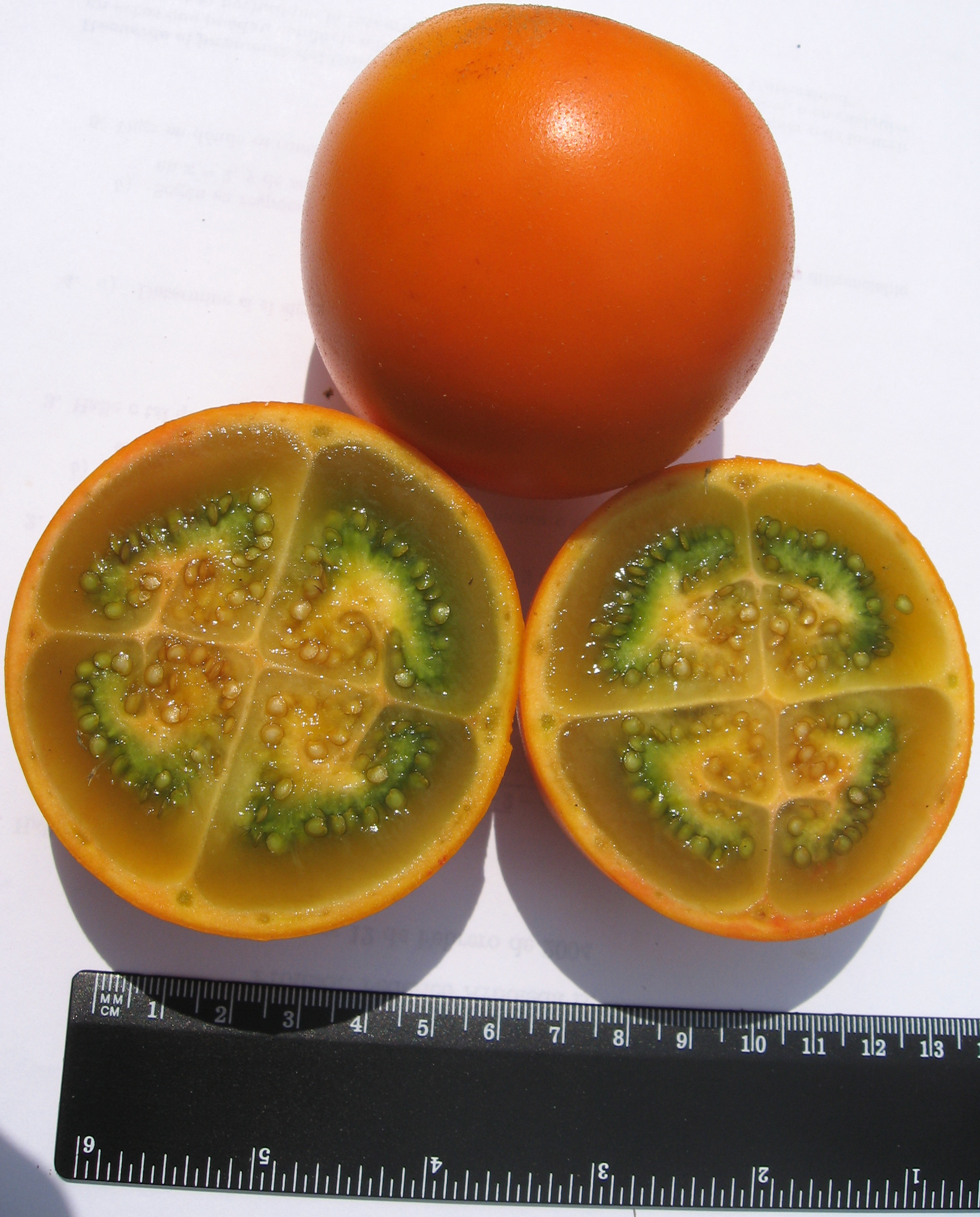
Lulo or Naranjilla (Solanum quitoense)

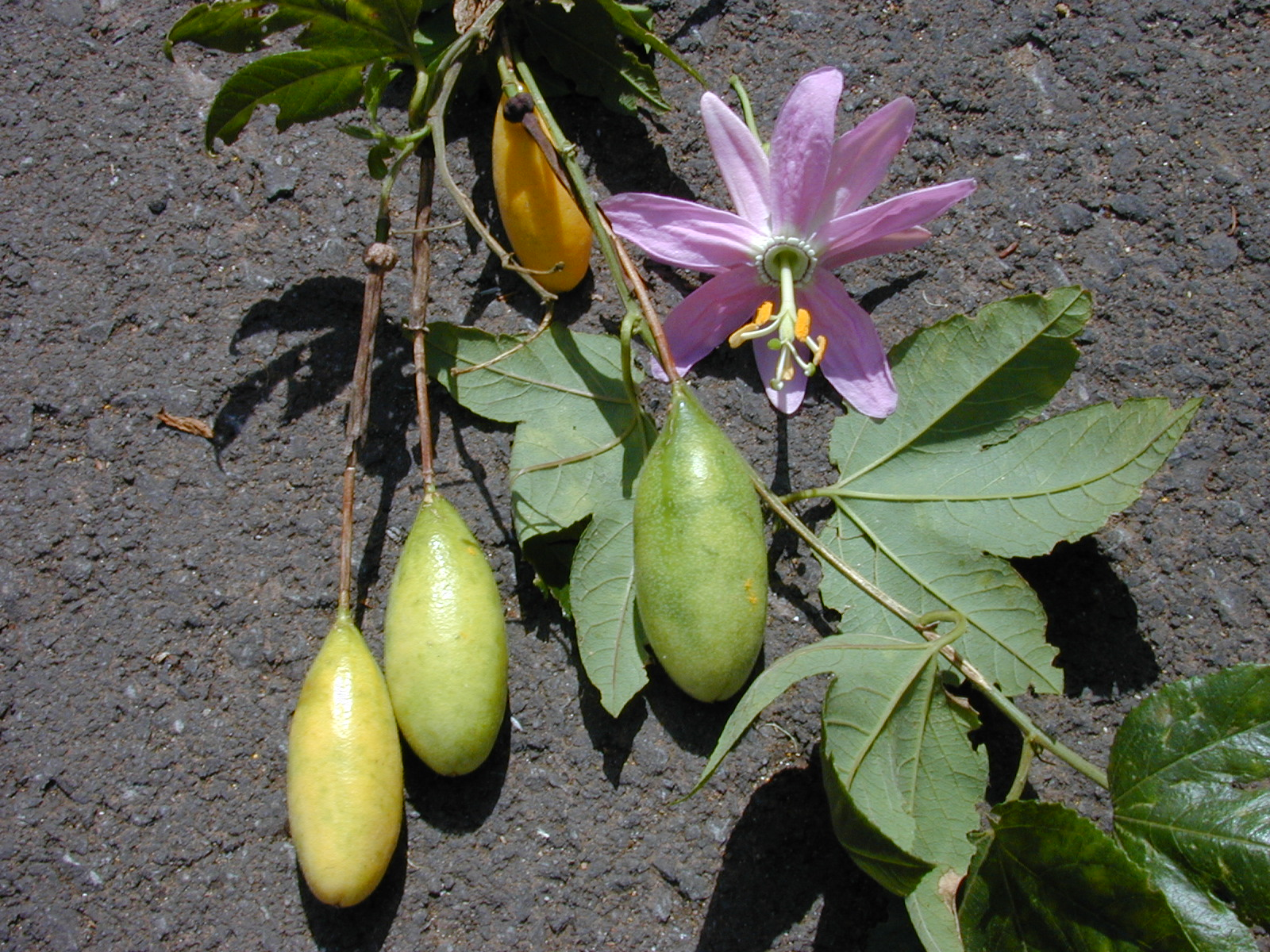
Curuba

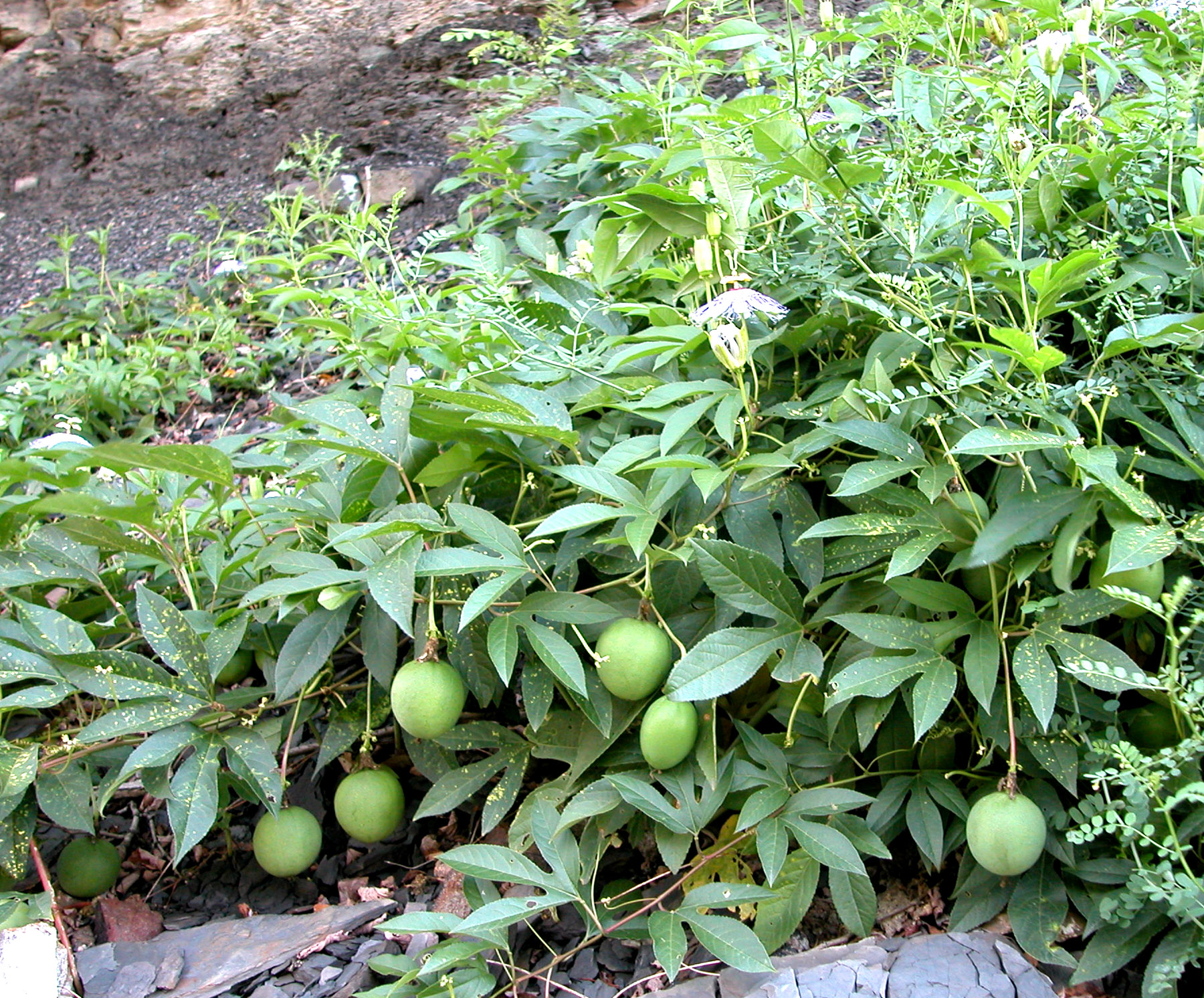
Maypop (Passiflora incarnata)

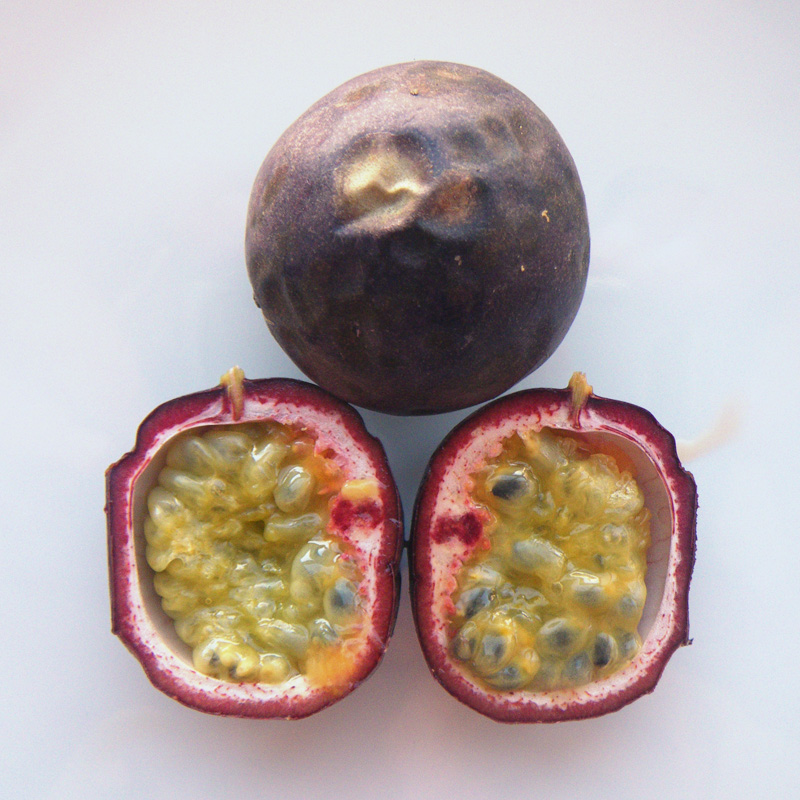
Gulupa or purple passion fruit (Passiflora edulis)

== Genera ==
There are over 3900 Genera in the flora of Colombia Some representational Genera are included below.

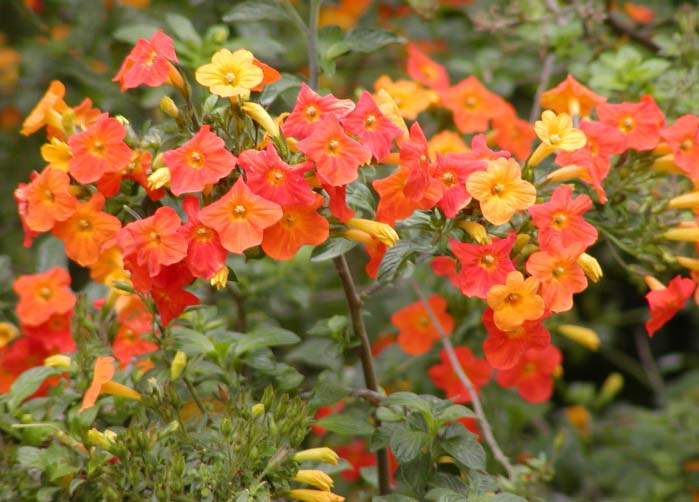
Marmalade bush (Streptosolen jamesonii)

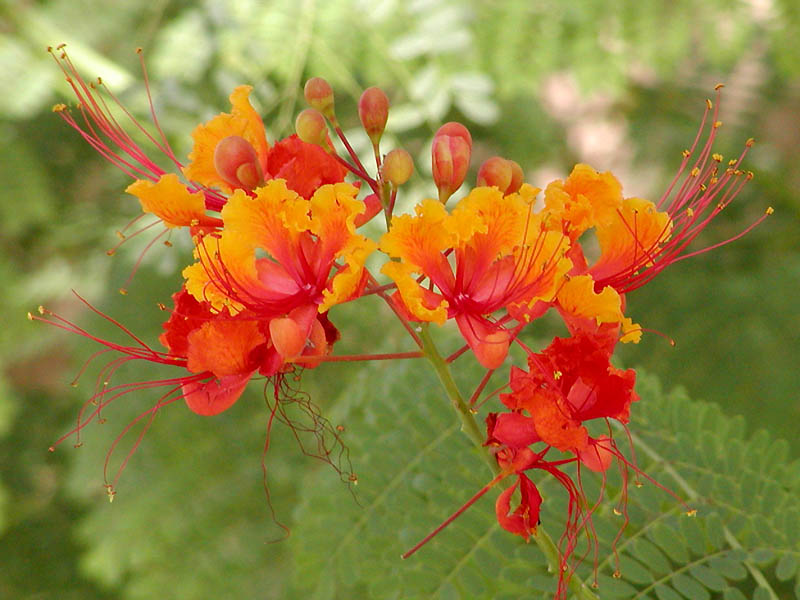
The Arrayan was sacred to precolumbian peoples

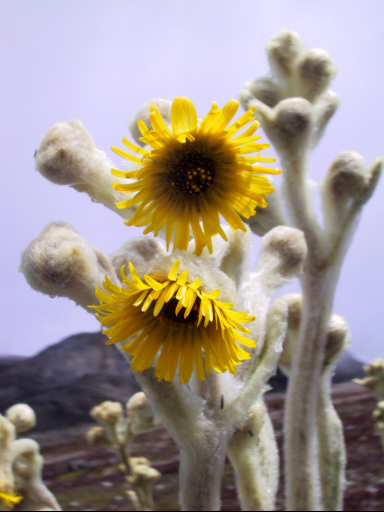
Espeletia schultzii

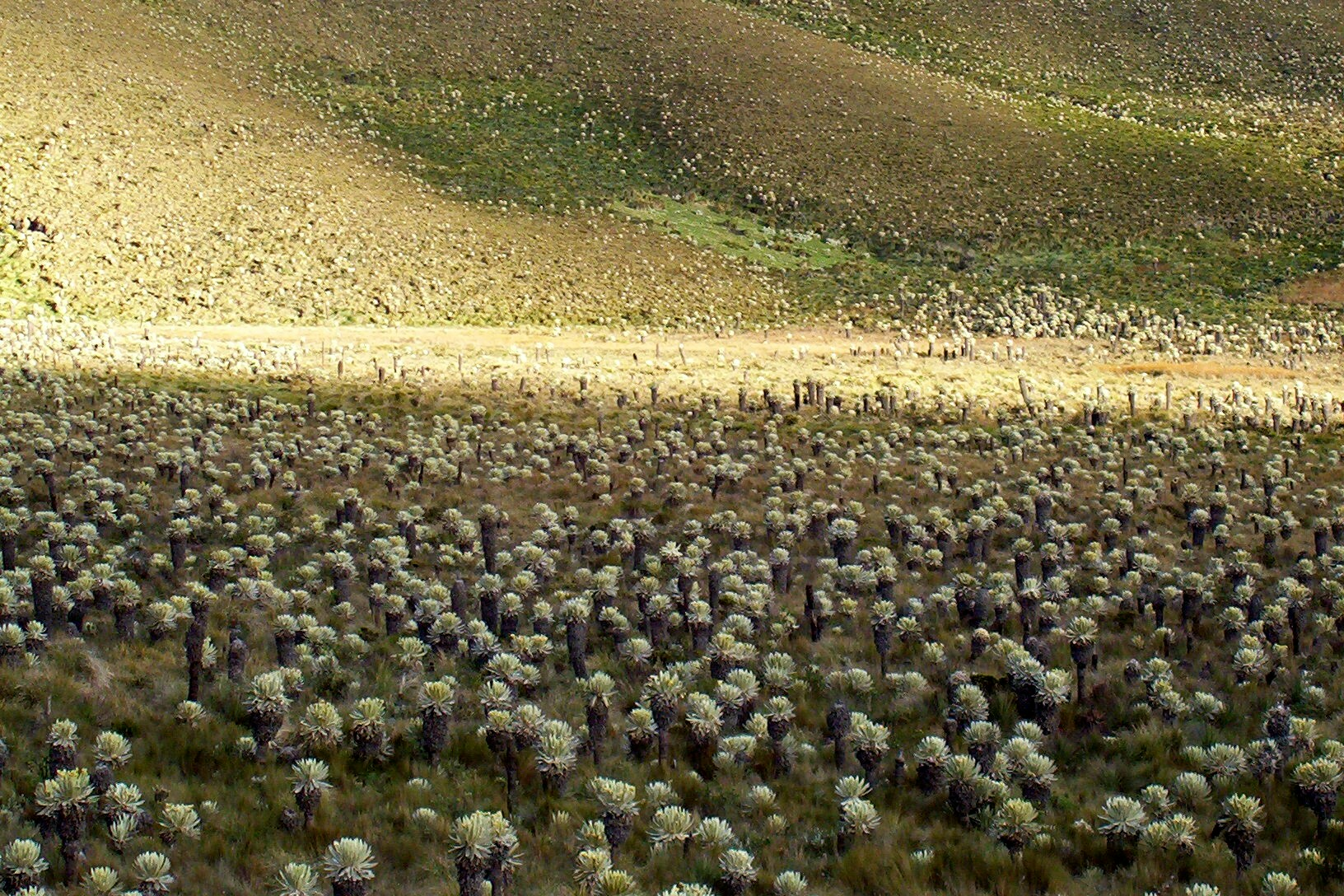
Espeletia pycnophylla

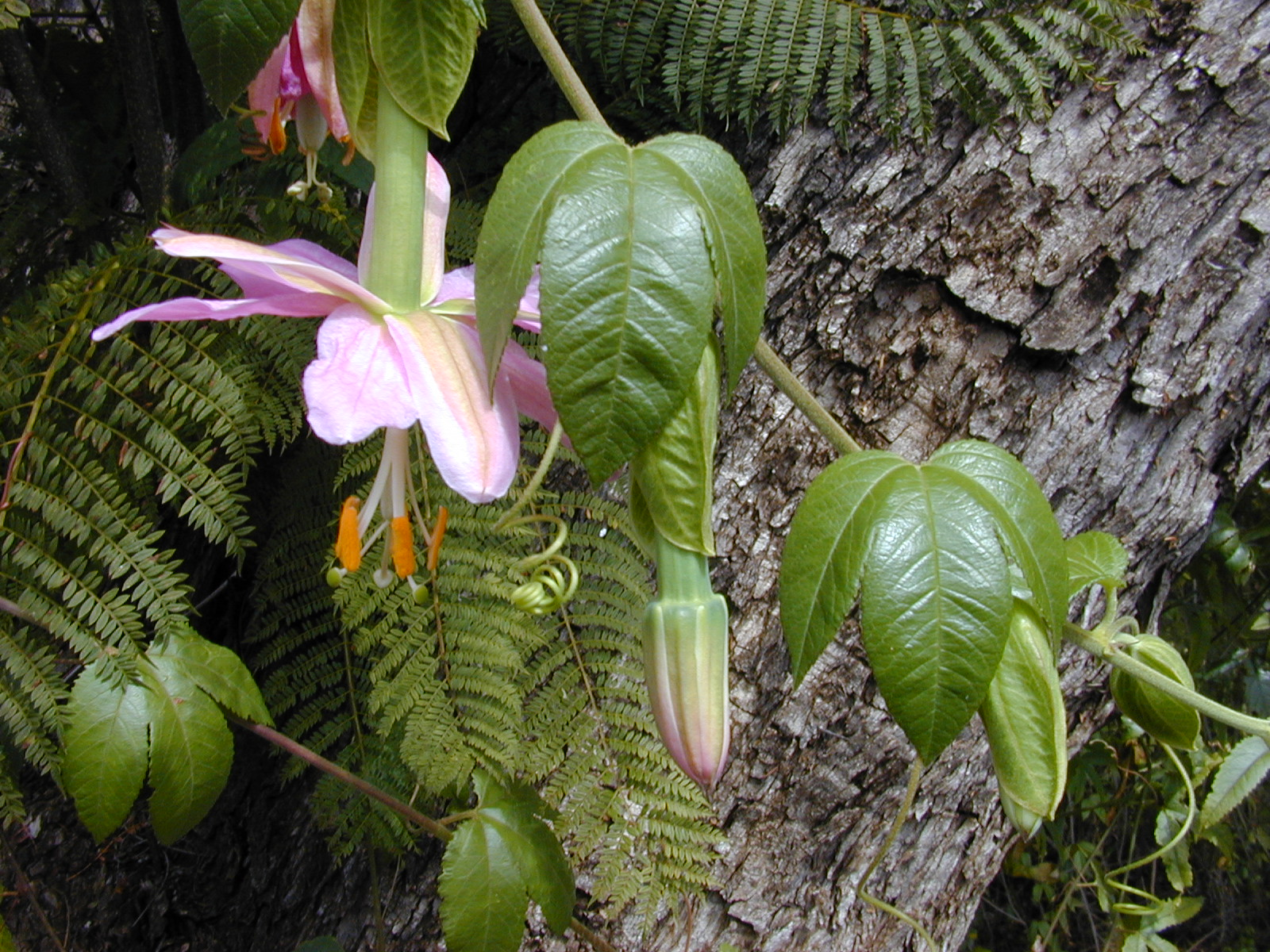
Passiflora tarminiana

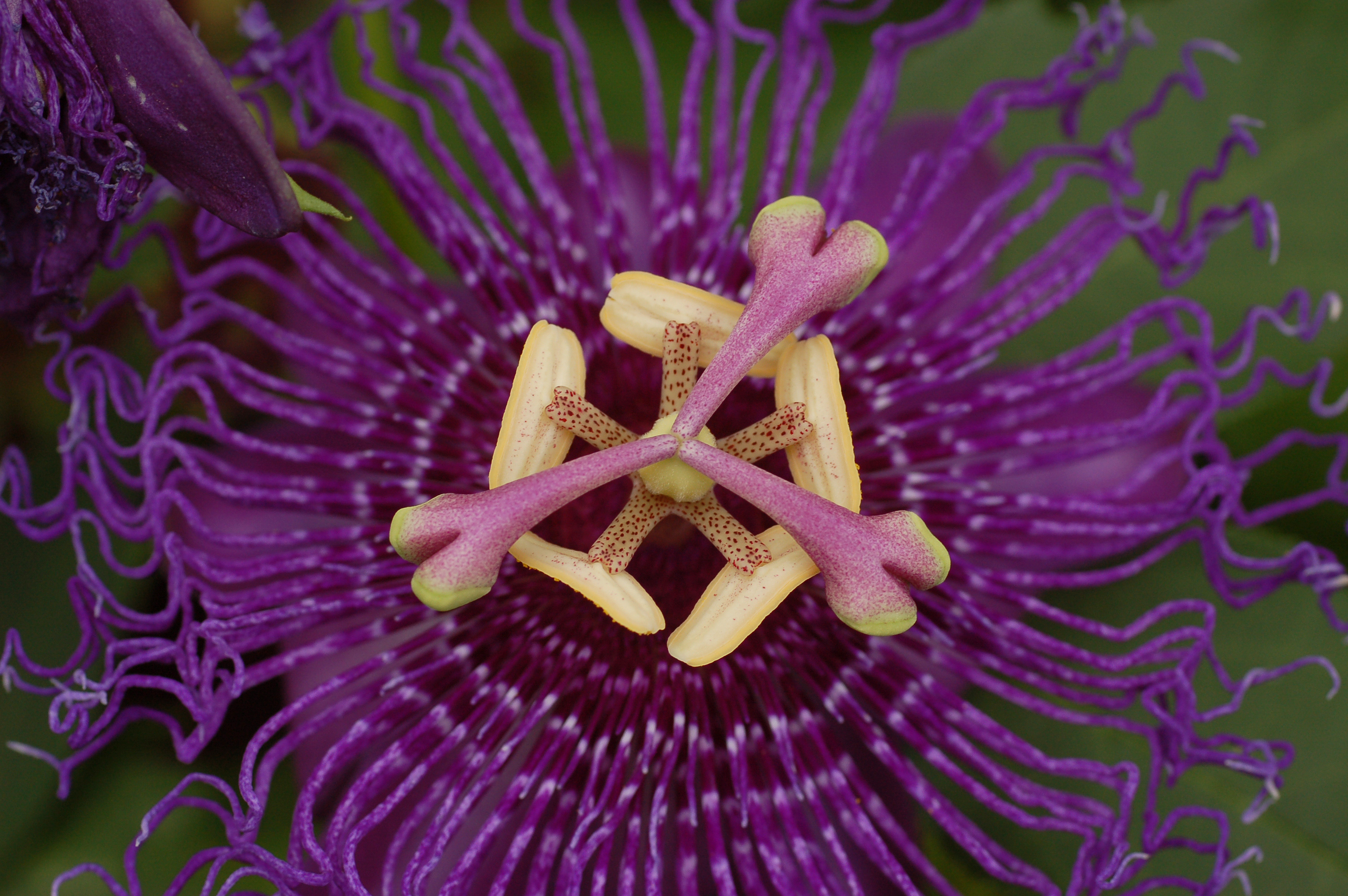
Velvety Passion Flower

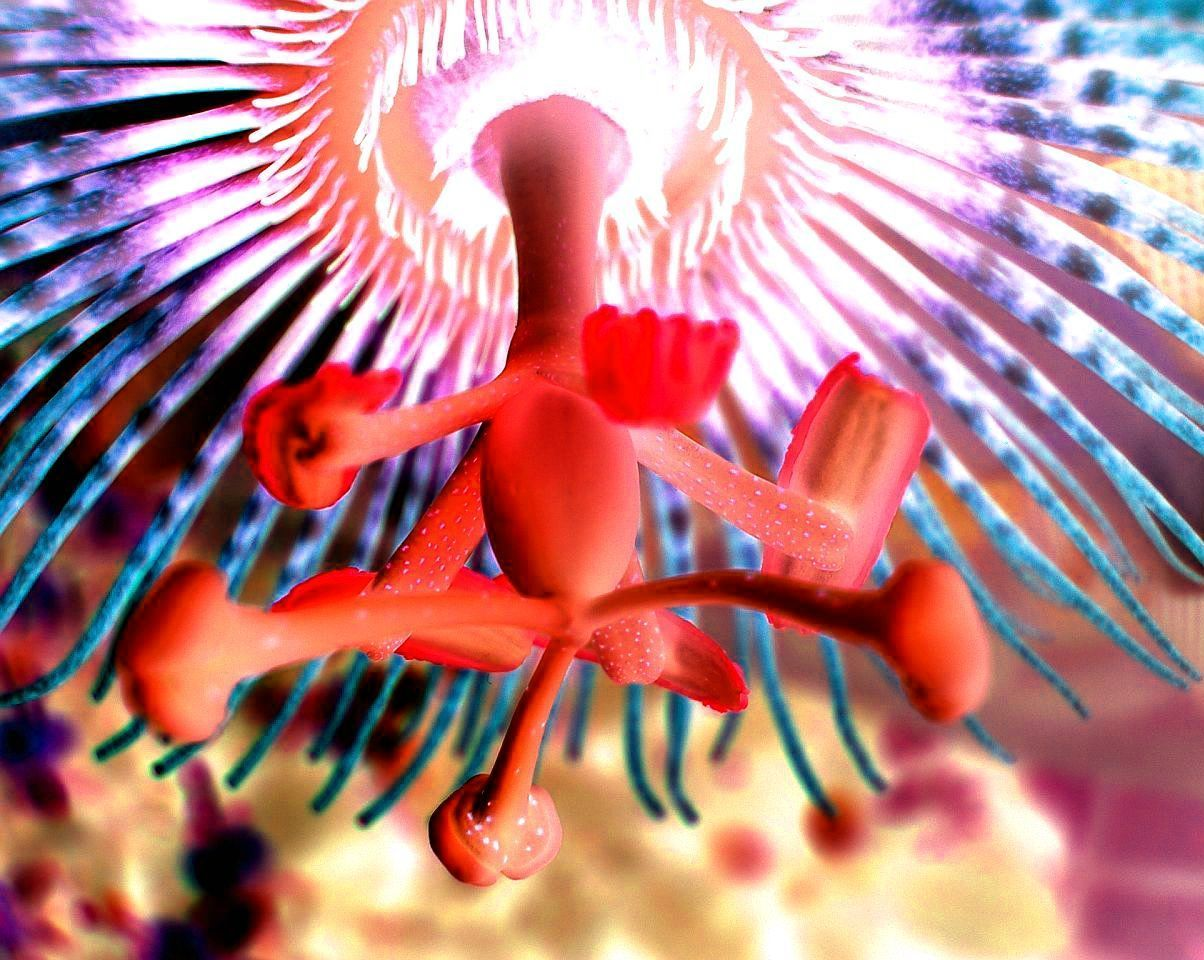
Orange Passion Flower

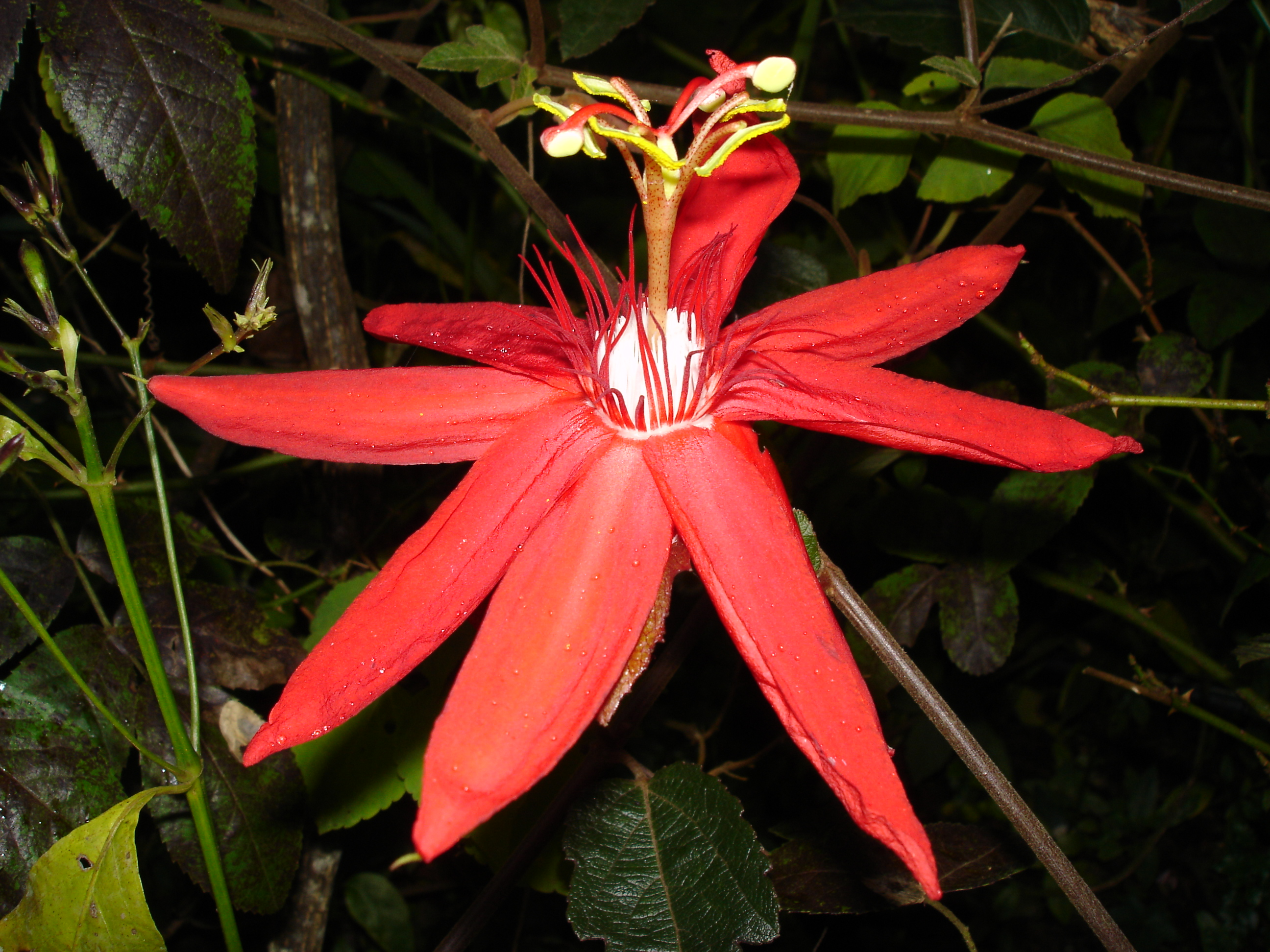
Passiflora coccinea

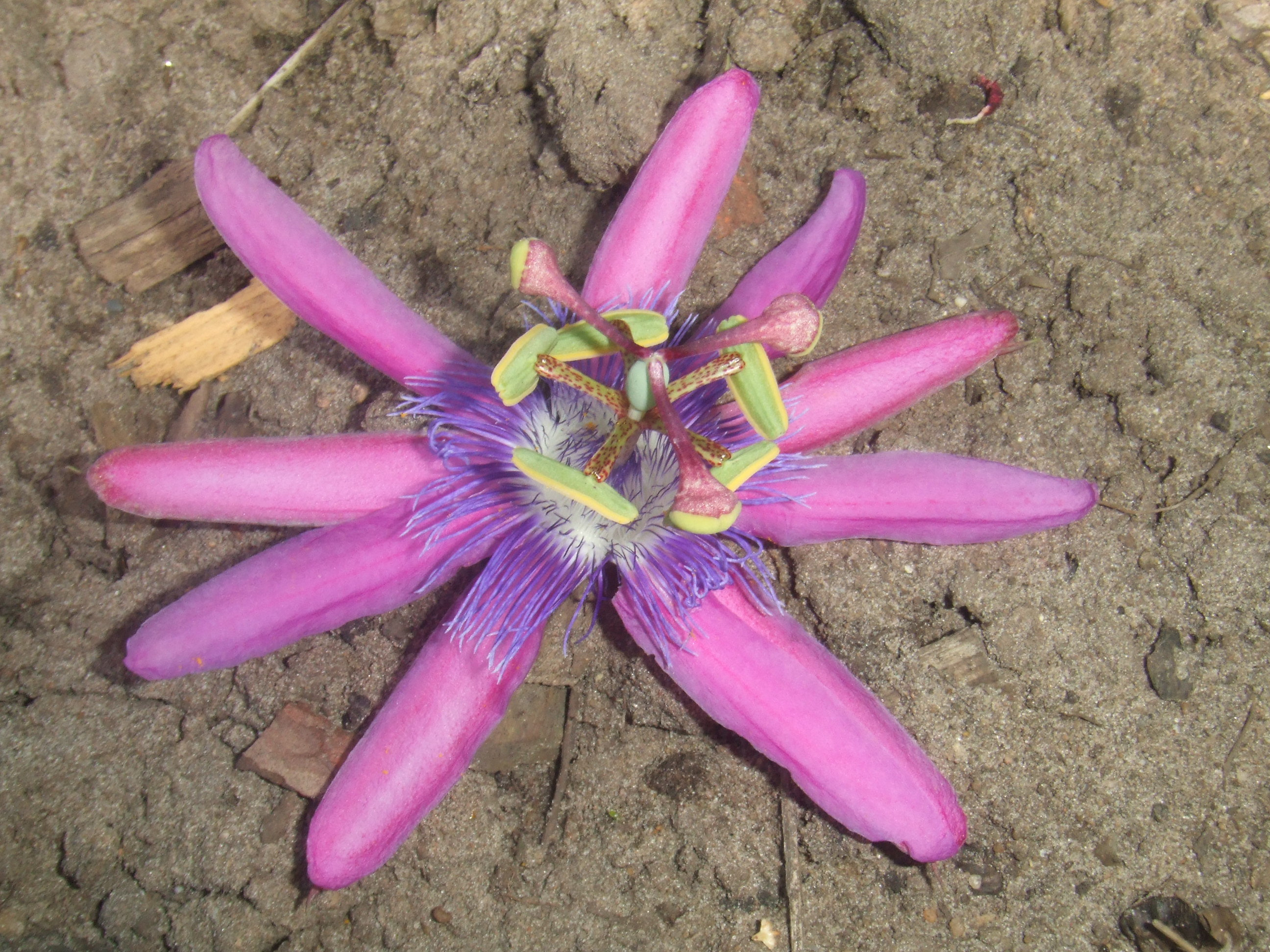
Passiflora loefgrenii

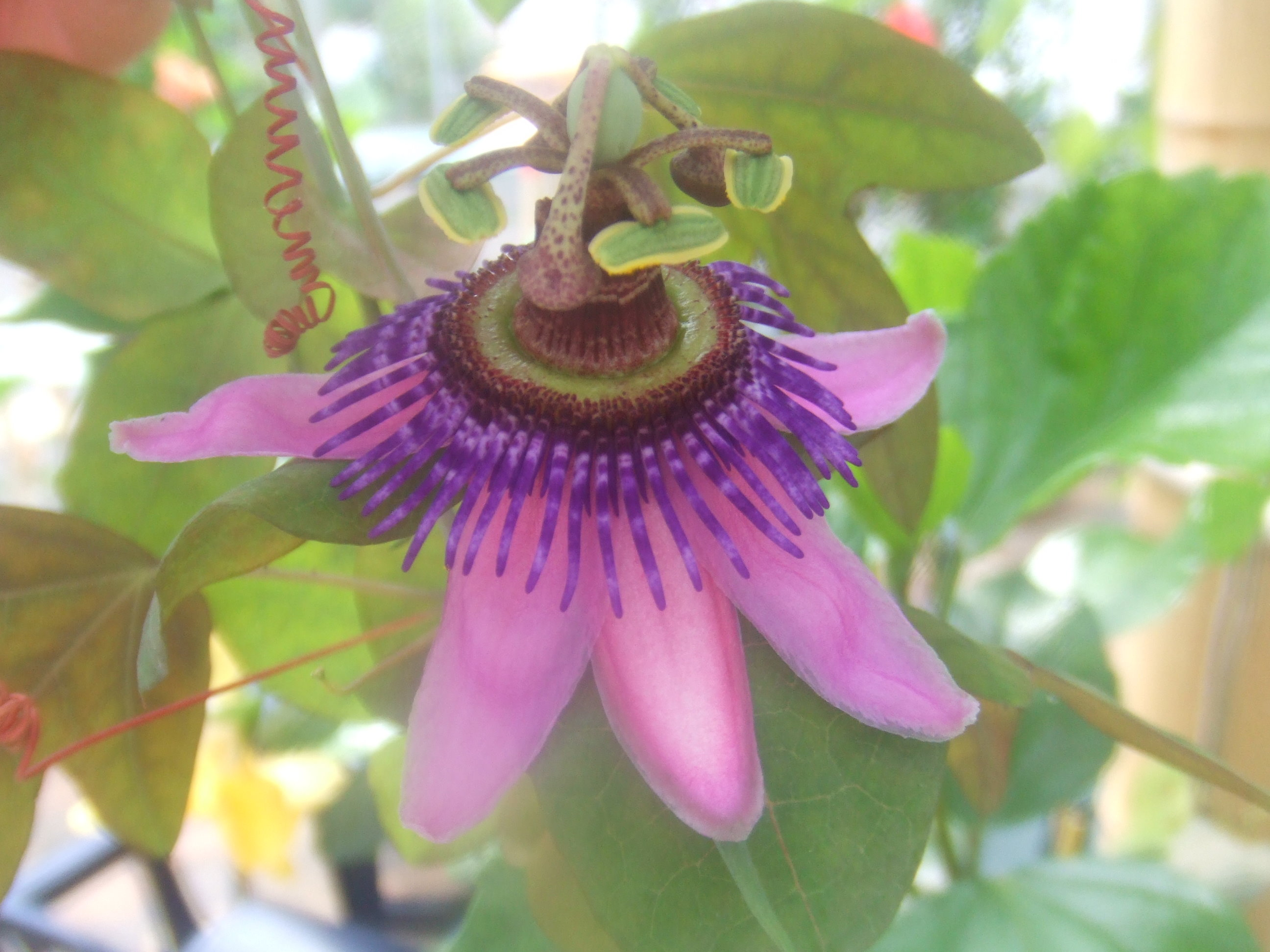
Passiflora picturata

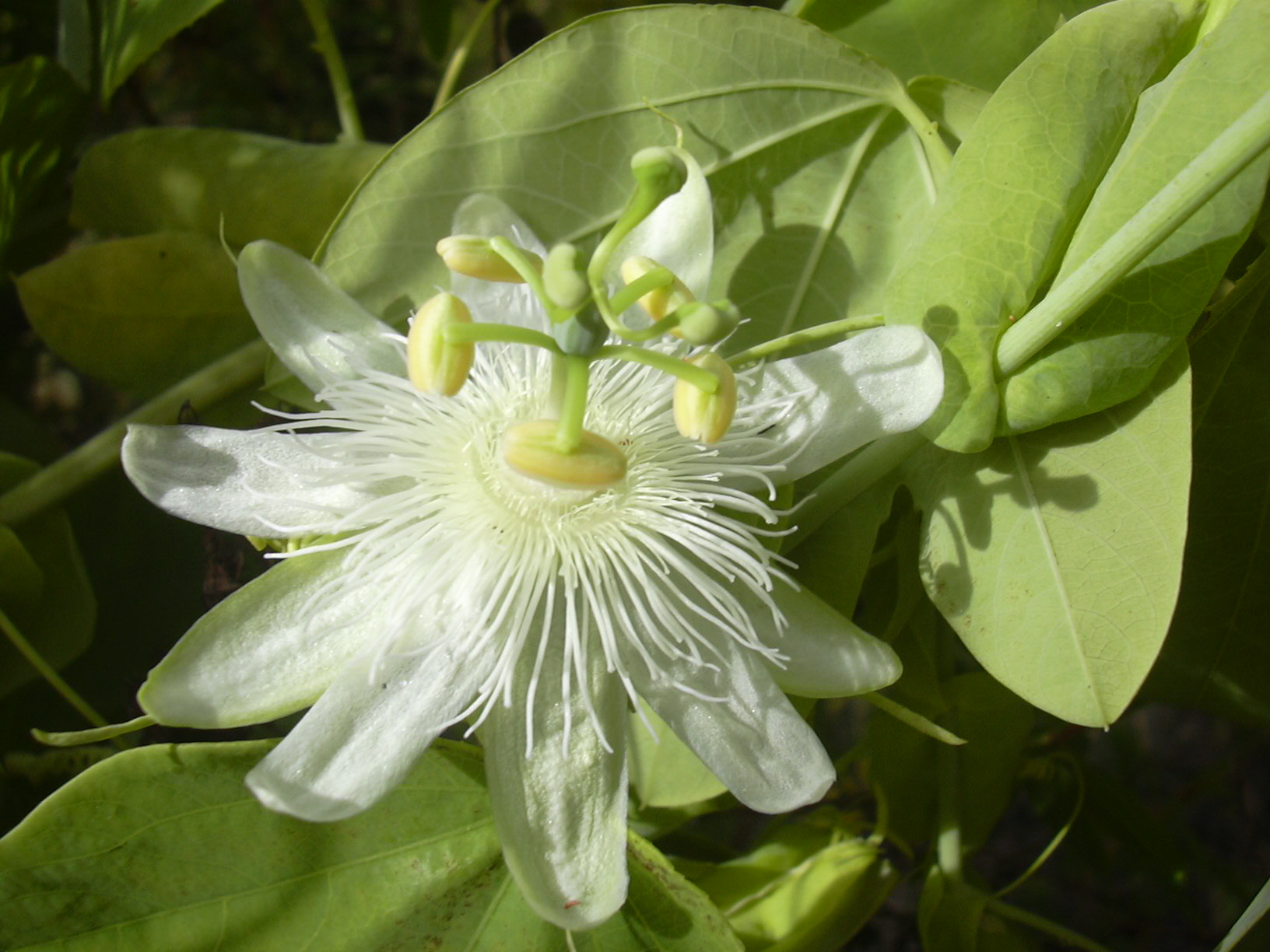
Passiflora subpeltata

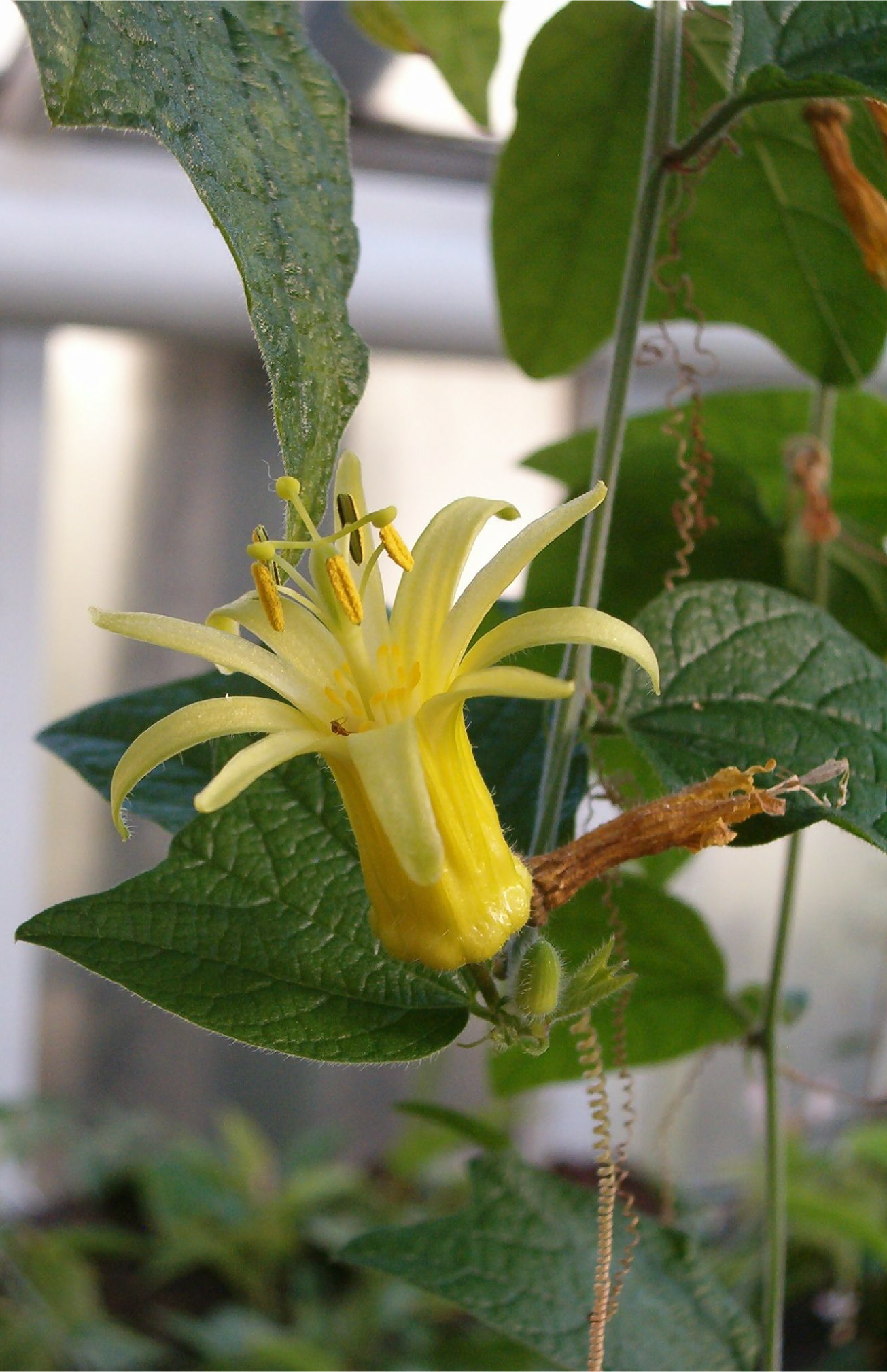
Passiflora citrina

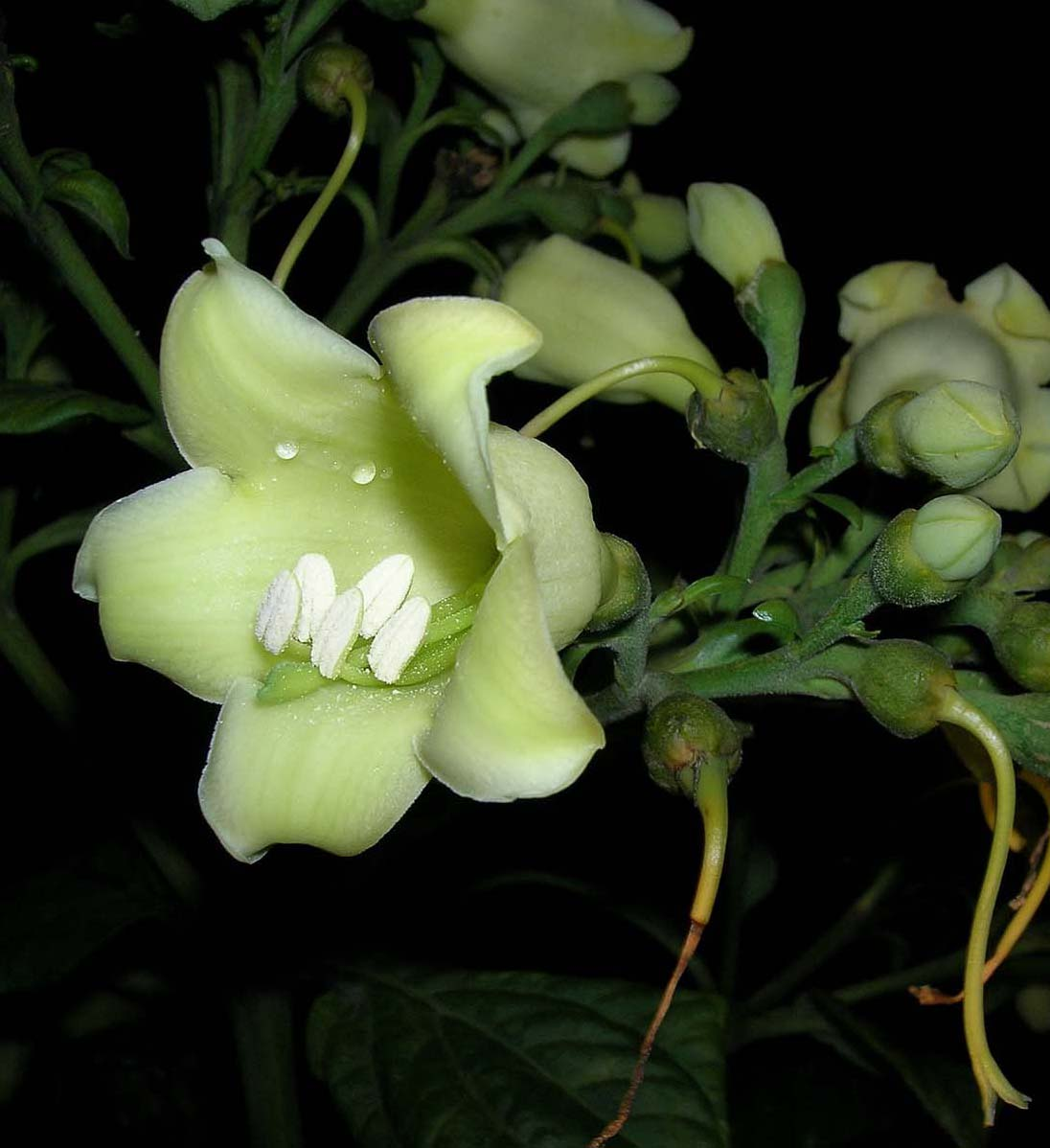
Macrocarpaea calophylla

Macrocarpaea apparata

=== Abarema ===
- Abarema callejasii
- Abarema ganymedea
- Abarema josephi
- Abarema killipii
- Abarema lehmannii

=== Acidocroton ===
- Acidocroton gentryi

=== Aiphanes ===
- Aiphanes acaulis
- Aiphanes duquei
- Aiphanes leiostachys
- Aiphanes lindeniana
- Aiphanes linearis

=== Aniba ===
- Aniba novo-granatensis
- Aniba rosaeodora
- Aniba vaupesiana

=== Brownea ===
- Brownea santanderensis
- Browneopsis excelsa

=== Brunellia ===
- Brunellia almaguerensis
- Brunellia antioquensis
- Brunellia boqueronensis
- Brunellia elliptica
- Brunellia farallonensis
- Brunellia macrophylla
- Brunellia occidentalis
- Brunellia penderiscana
- Brunellia racemifera
- Brunellia rufa
- Brunellia subsessilis

=== Calatola ===
- Calatola columbiana

=== Centronia ===
- Centronia brachycera
- Centronia mutisii

=== Ceroxylon ===
- Ceroxylon alpinum
- Ceroxylon ferrugineum
- Ceroxylon quindiuense
- Ceroxylon sasaimae

=== Clusia ===
- Clusia croatii
- Clusia osseocarpa

=== Eschweilera ===
- Eschweilera bogotensis
- Eschweilera boltenii
- Eschweilera integricalyx
- Eschweilera integrifolia
- Eschweilera pittieri
- Eschweilera punctata
- Eschweilera rimbachii
- Eschweilera sclerophylla

=== Freziera ===
- Freziera echinata
- Freziera euryoides
- Freziera jaramilloi
- Freziera longipes
- Freziera punctata
- Freziera retinveria
- Freziera sessiliflora
- Freziera smithiana
- Freziera stuebelii
- Freziera velutina

=== Grias ===
- Grias colombiana
- Grias haughtii
- Grias multinervia

=== Guarea ===
- Guarea caulobotrys
- Guarea corrugata

=== Gustavia ===
- Gustavia excelsa
- Gustavia foliosa
- Gustavia gracillima
- Gustavia latifolia
- Gustavia longifuniculata
- Gustavia monocaulis
- Gustavia petiolata
- Gustavia pubescens
- Gustavia santanderiensis
- Gustavia sessilis
- Gustavia verticillata

=== Herrania ===
- Herrania laciniifolia
- Herrania umbratica

=== Huilaea ===
- Huilaea kirkbridei
- Huilaea macrocarpa
- Huilaea minor
- Huilaea mutisiana
- Huilaea occidentalis
- Huilaea penduliflora

=== Inga ===
- Inga allenii
- Inga coragypsea
- Inga goniocalyx
- Inga interfluminensis
- Inga macarenensis
- Inga mucuna
- Inga saffordiana

=== Lejeunea ===
- Lejeunea drehwaldii (syn. Sphaerolejeunea umbilicata)

=== Leptolejeunea ===
- Leptolejeunea tridentata

=== Macrolobium ===
- Macrolobium pittieri

=== Magnolia ===
- Magnolia calimaensis
- Magnolia calophylla
- Magnolia cararensis
- Magnolia caricifragrans
- Magnolia cespedesii
- Magnolia colombiana
- Magnolia espinalii
- Magnolia georgii
- Magnolia gilbertoi
- Magnolia guatapensis
- Magnolia henaoi
- Magnolia hernandezii
- Magnolia katiorum
- Magnolia lenticellata
- Magnolia mahechae
- Magnolia narinensis
- Magnolia polyhypsophylla
- Magnolia santanderiana
- Magnolia urraoense
- Magnolia virolinensis
- Magnolia wolfii
- Magnolia yarumalense

=== Mayna ===
- Mayna pubescens
- Mayna suaveolens

=== Meriania ===
- Meriania peltata
- Meriania versicolor

=== Metteniusa ===
- Metteniusa cundinamarcensis
- Metteniusa edulis
- Metteniusa huilensis
- Metteniusa santanderensis

=== Miconia ===
- Miconia poecilantha

=== Moquilea ===
- Moquilea salicifolia

=== Oenocarpus ===
- Oenocarpus circumtextus
- Oenocarpus makeru
- Oenocarpus simplex

=== Orphanodendron ===
- Orphanodendron bernalii

=== Parmentiera ===
- Parmentiera stenocarpa

=== Passiflora ===
- Passiflora tarminiana

=== Phytelephas ===
- Phytelephas seemannii
- Phytelephas tumacana

=== Pouteria ===
- Pouteria arguacoensium
- Pouteria bracteata
- Pouteria chocoensis
- Pouteria espinae

=== Pradosia ===
- Pradosia cuatrecasasii

=== Prunus ===
- Prunus buxifolia
- Prunus guanaiensis
- Prunus huantensis
- Prunus integrifolia
- Prunus littlei
- Prunus subcorymbosa
- Prunus villegasiana, synonym of Prunus integrifolia

=== Rinorea ===
- Rinorea antioquiensis
- Rinorea cordata
- Rinorea haughtii
- Rinorea hymenosepala
- Rinorea laurifolia
- Rinorea marginata
- Rinorea ulmifolia

=== Rollinia ===
- Rollinia amazonica
- Rollinia pachyantha
- Rollinia rufinervis

=== Romeroa ===
- Romeroa verticillata

=== Schoenocephalium ===
- Inírida flower

=== Solanum ===
- Solanum sibundoyense
- Solanum betaceum (tamarillo)

=== Streptosolen ===
- Streptosolen jamesonii

=== Swartzia ===
- Swartzia macrophylla
- Swartzia oraria
- Swartzia robiniifolia
- Swartzia santanderensis

=== Utricularia ===
- Utricularia neottioides
- Utricularia nervosa
- Utricularia oliveriana
- Utricularia pusilla
- Utricularia triloba

=== Vantanea ===
- Vantanea magdalenensis

=== Wettinia ===
- Wettinia anomala
- Wettinia disticha
- Wettinia fascicularis
- Wettinia hirsuta
- Wettinia kalbreyeri

=== Xylosma ===
- Xylosma obovata

=== Zamia ===
- Zamia amplifolia
- Zamia encephalartoides
- Zamia montana
- Zamia wallisii

=== Zygia ===
- Zygia lehmannii

== Orchid species ==
Colombia has the largest number of orchids in the world. Among others:

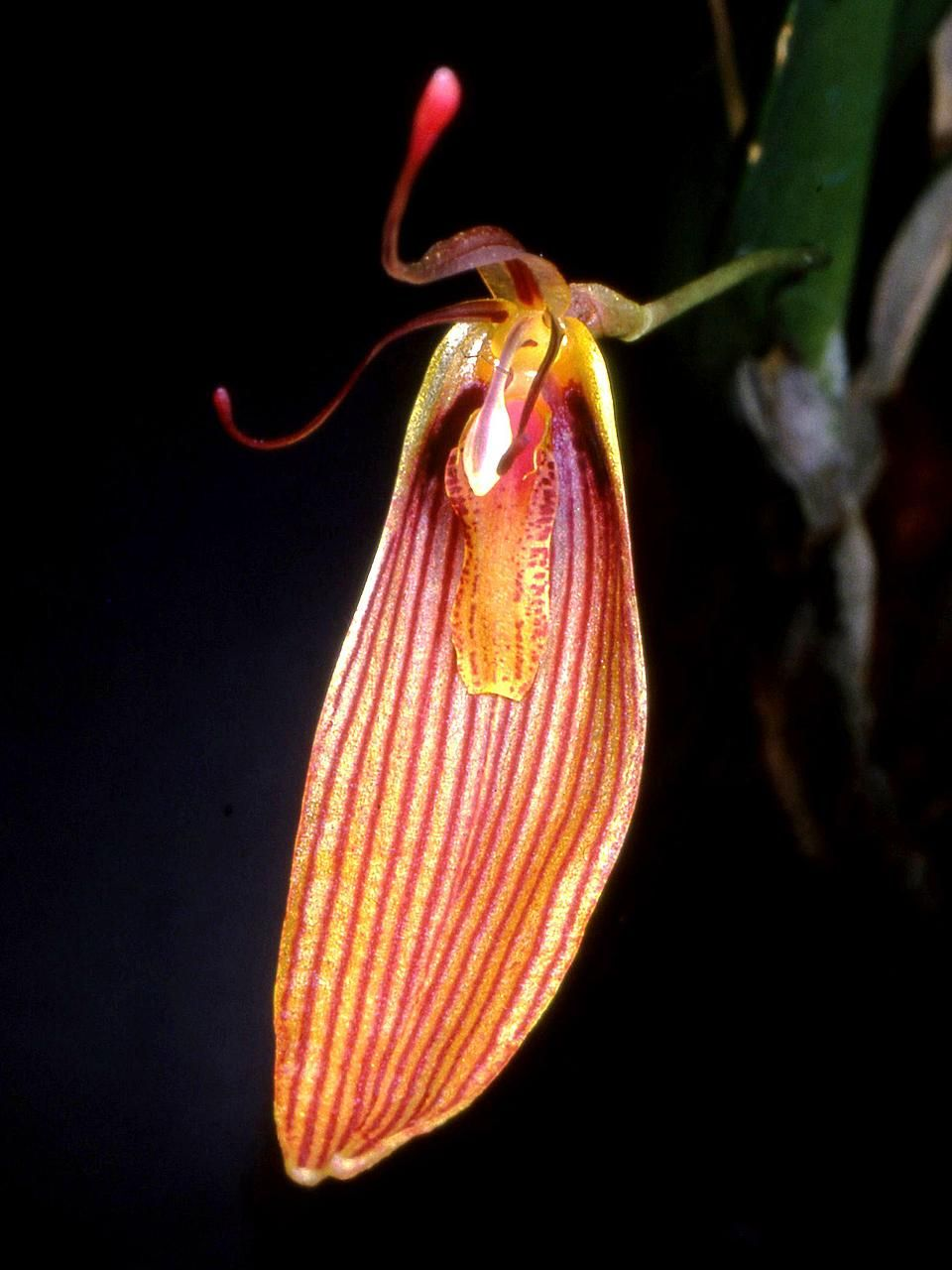
Restrepia antennifera

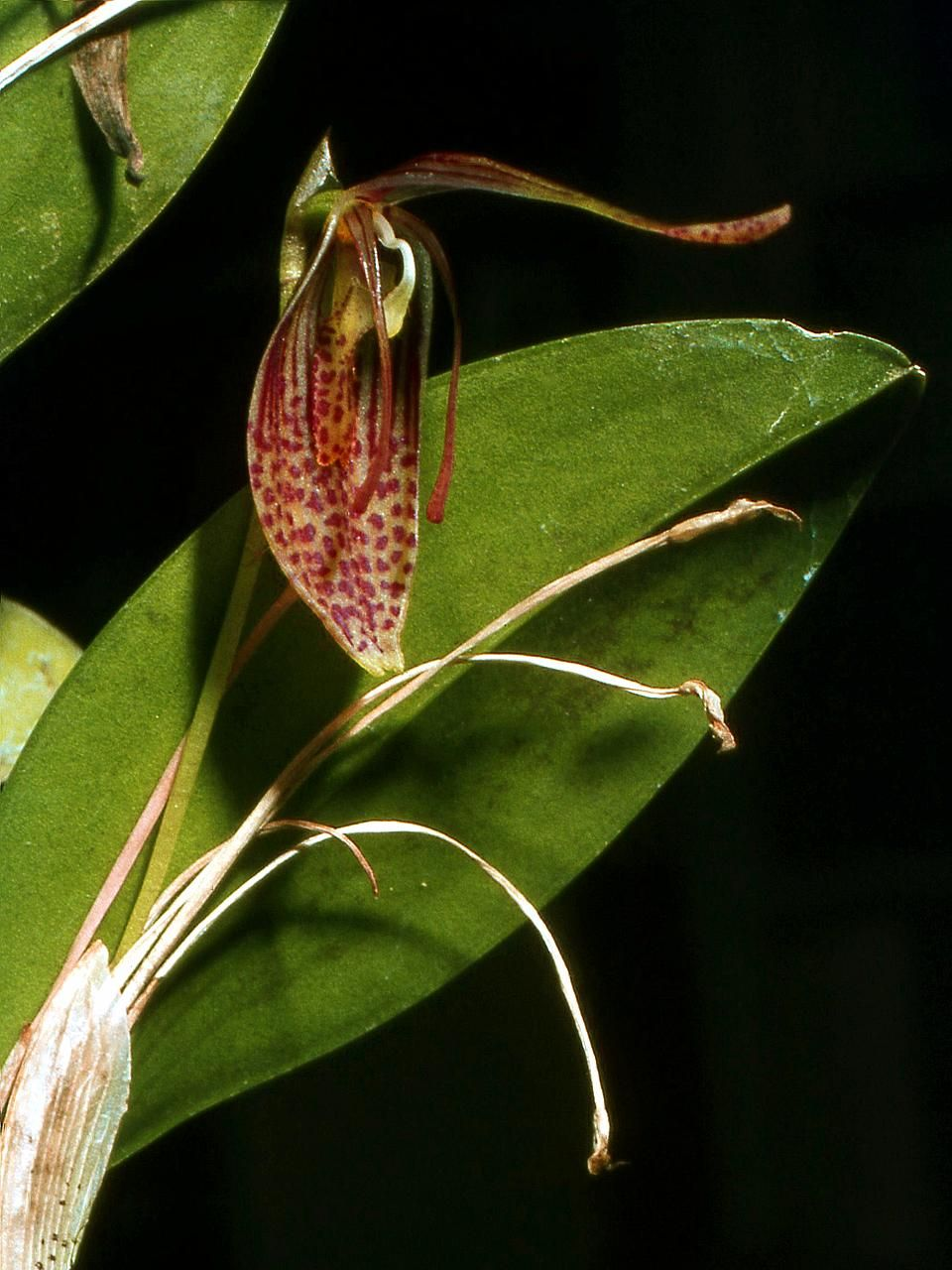
Restrepia aristulifera

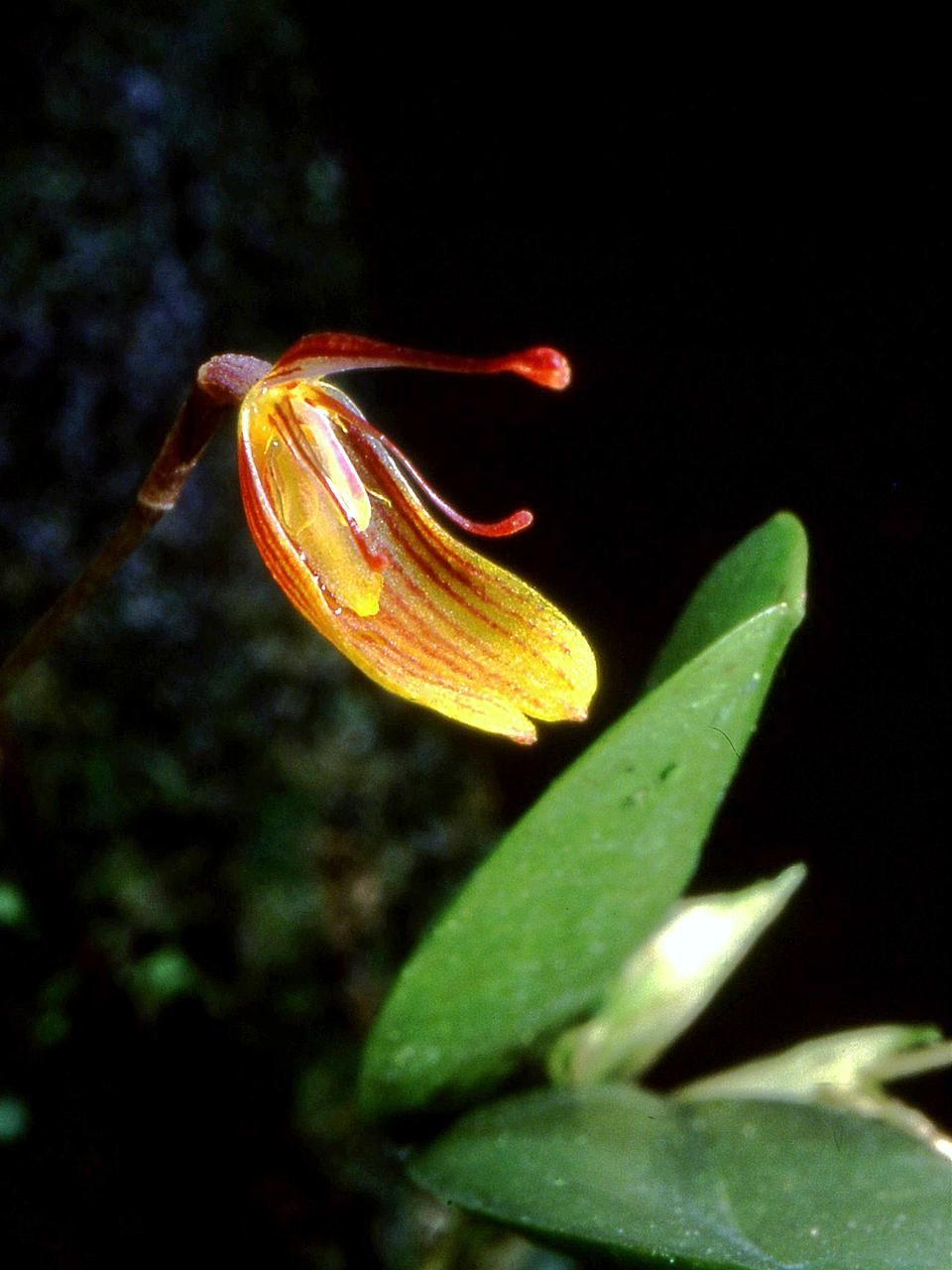
Restrepia aspasicensium

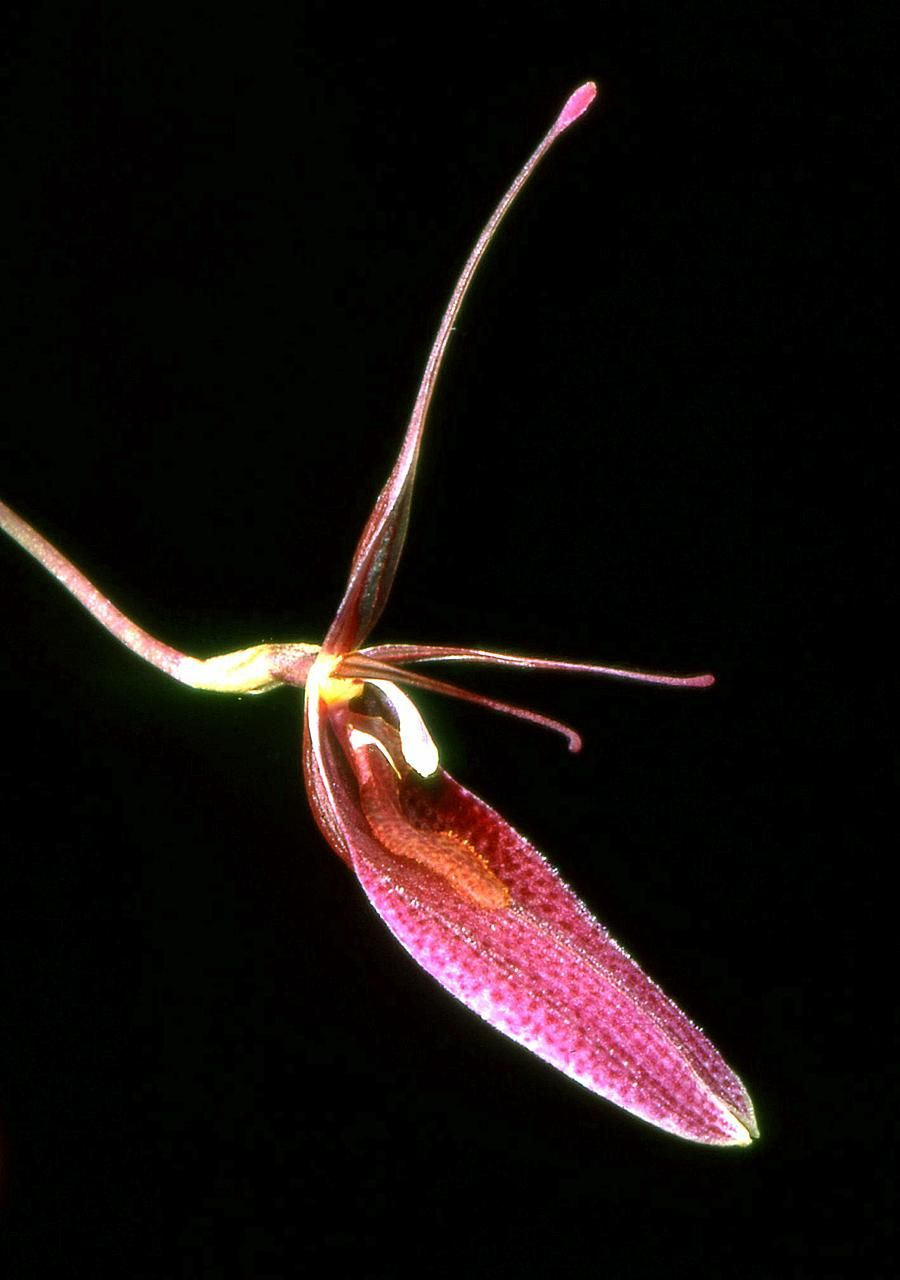
Restrepia brachypus

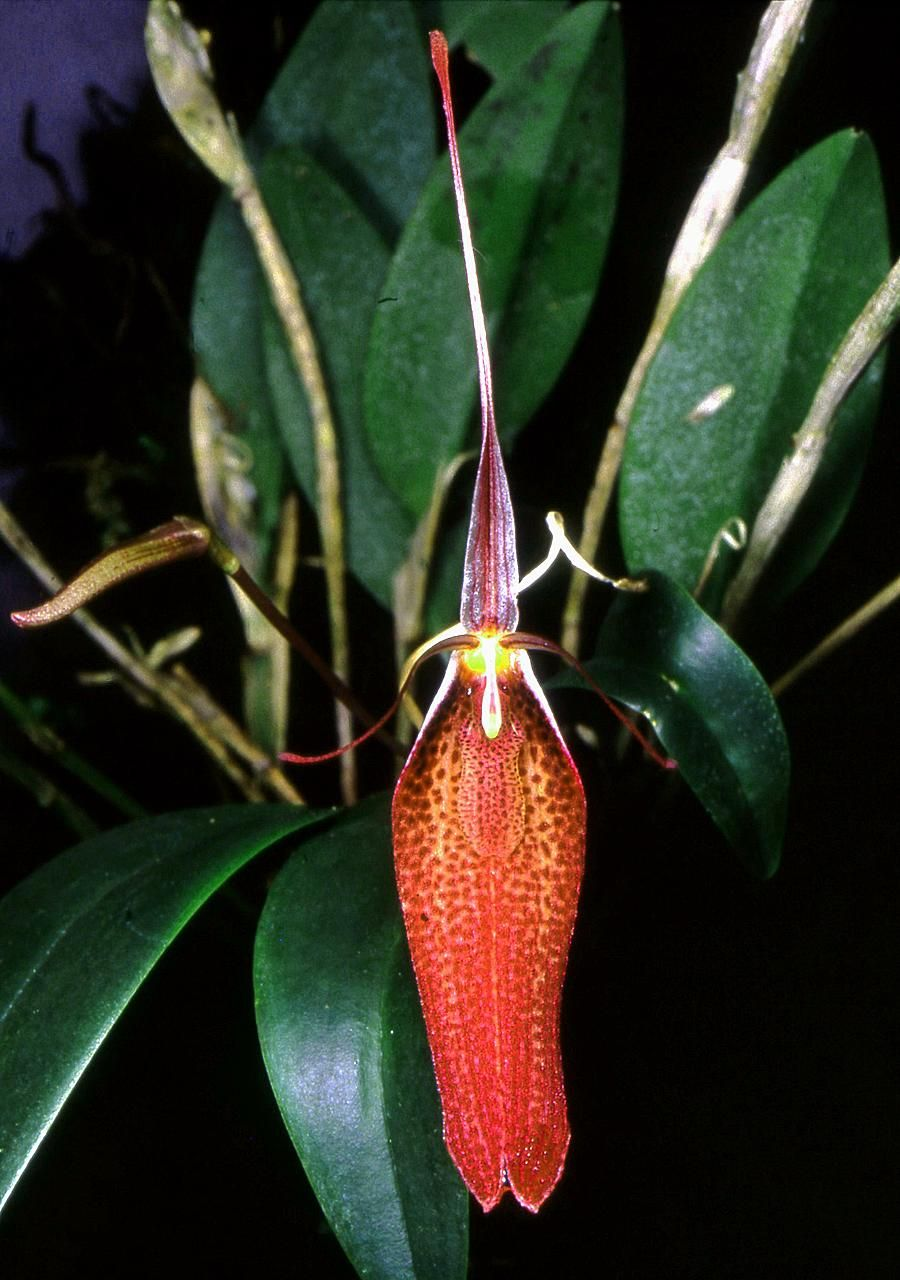
Restrepia contorta

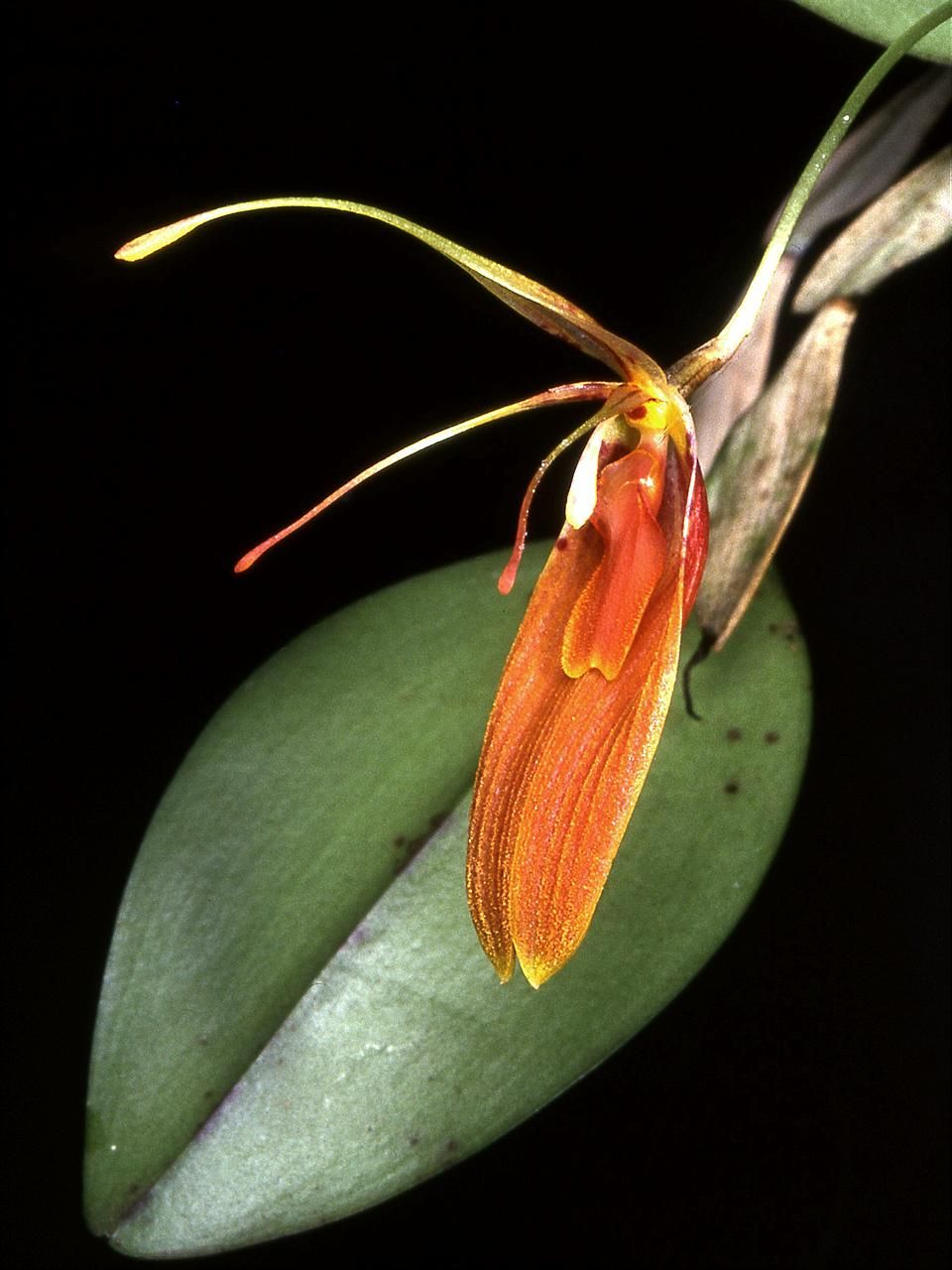
Restrepia cuprea]

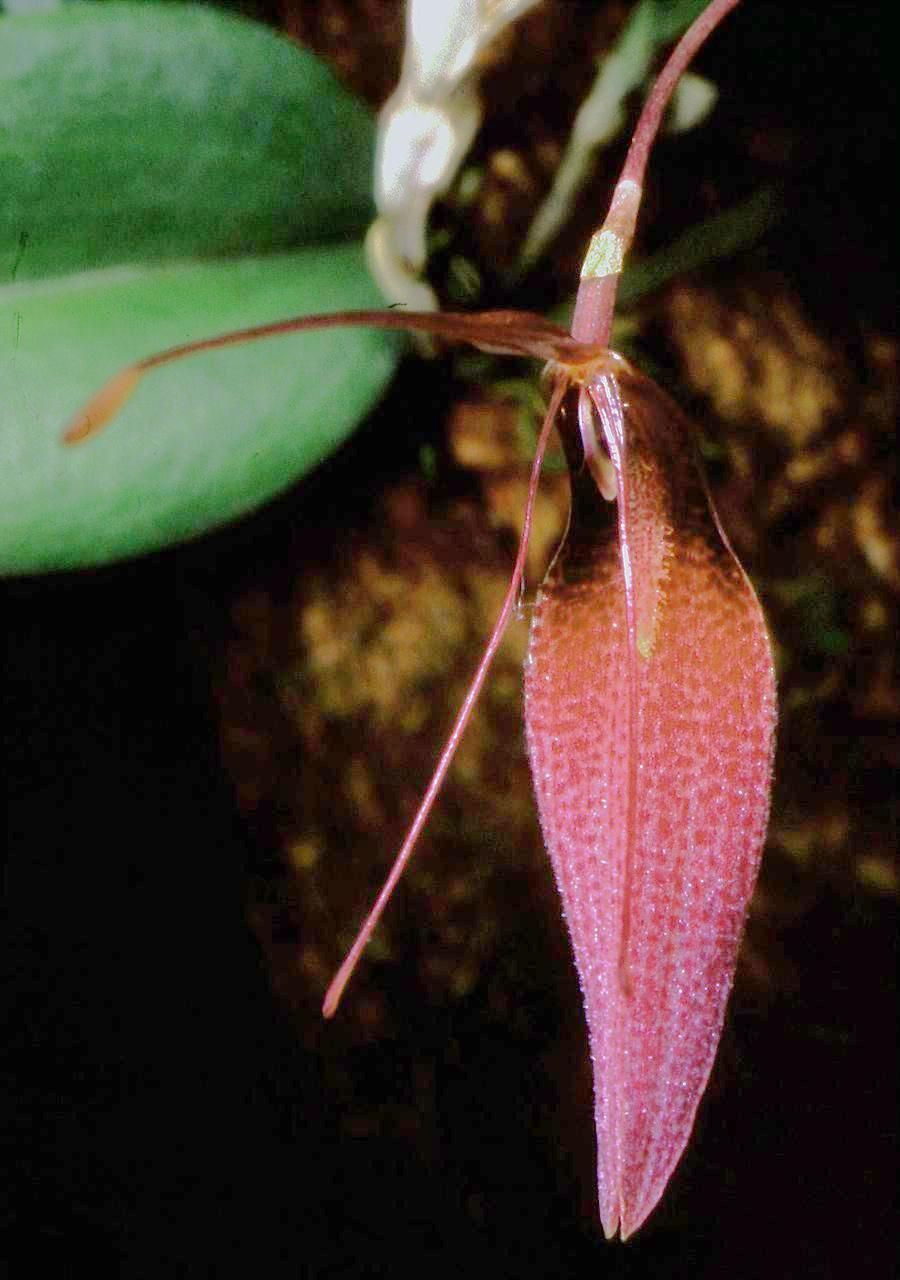
Restrepia dodsonii

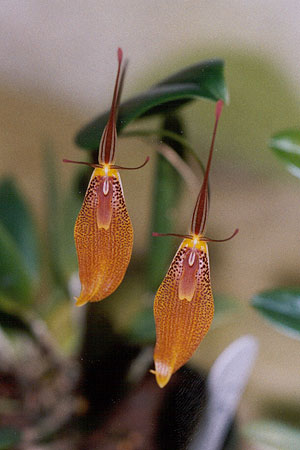
Restrepia elegans

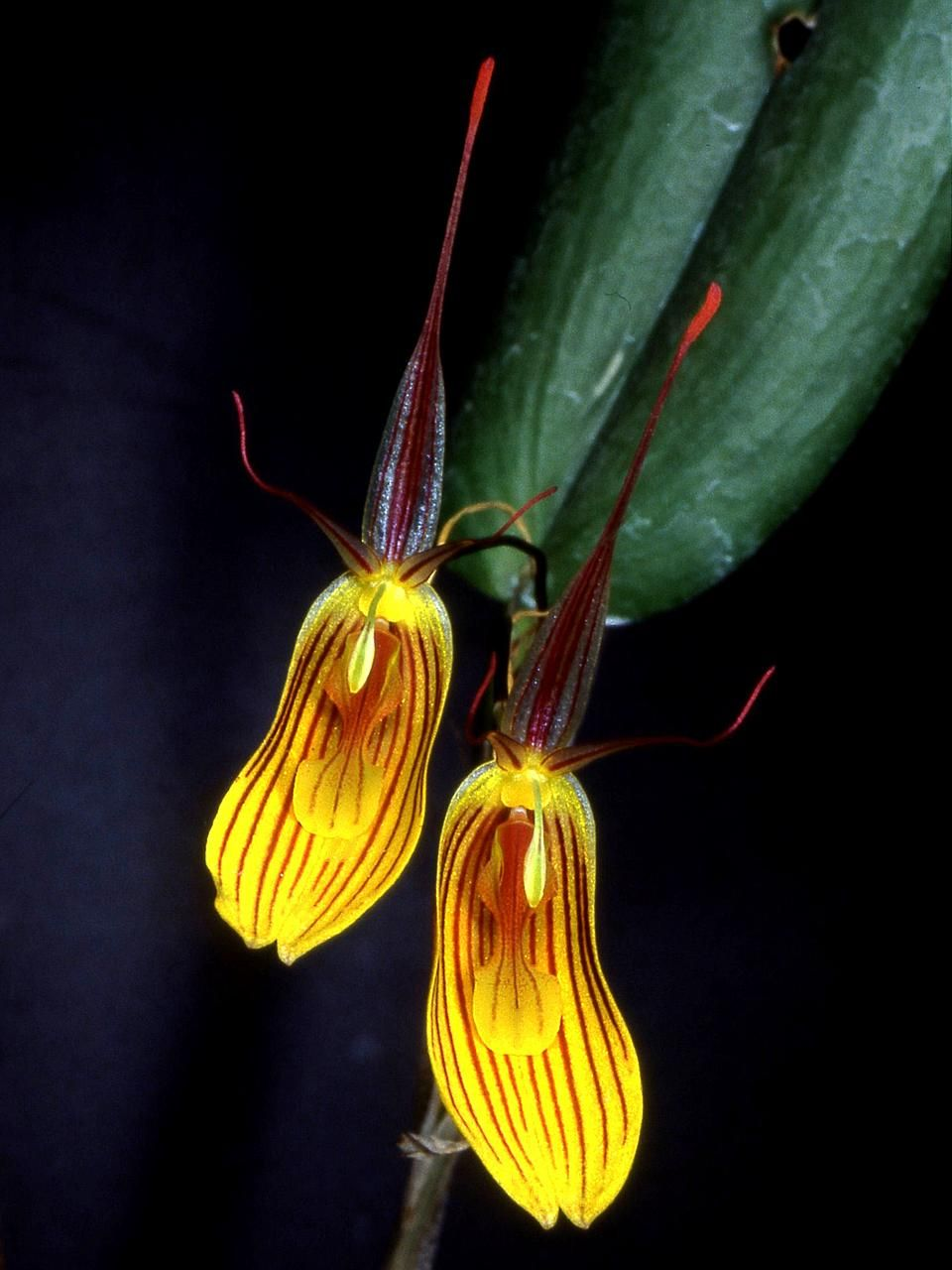
Restrepia falkenbergii

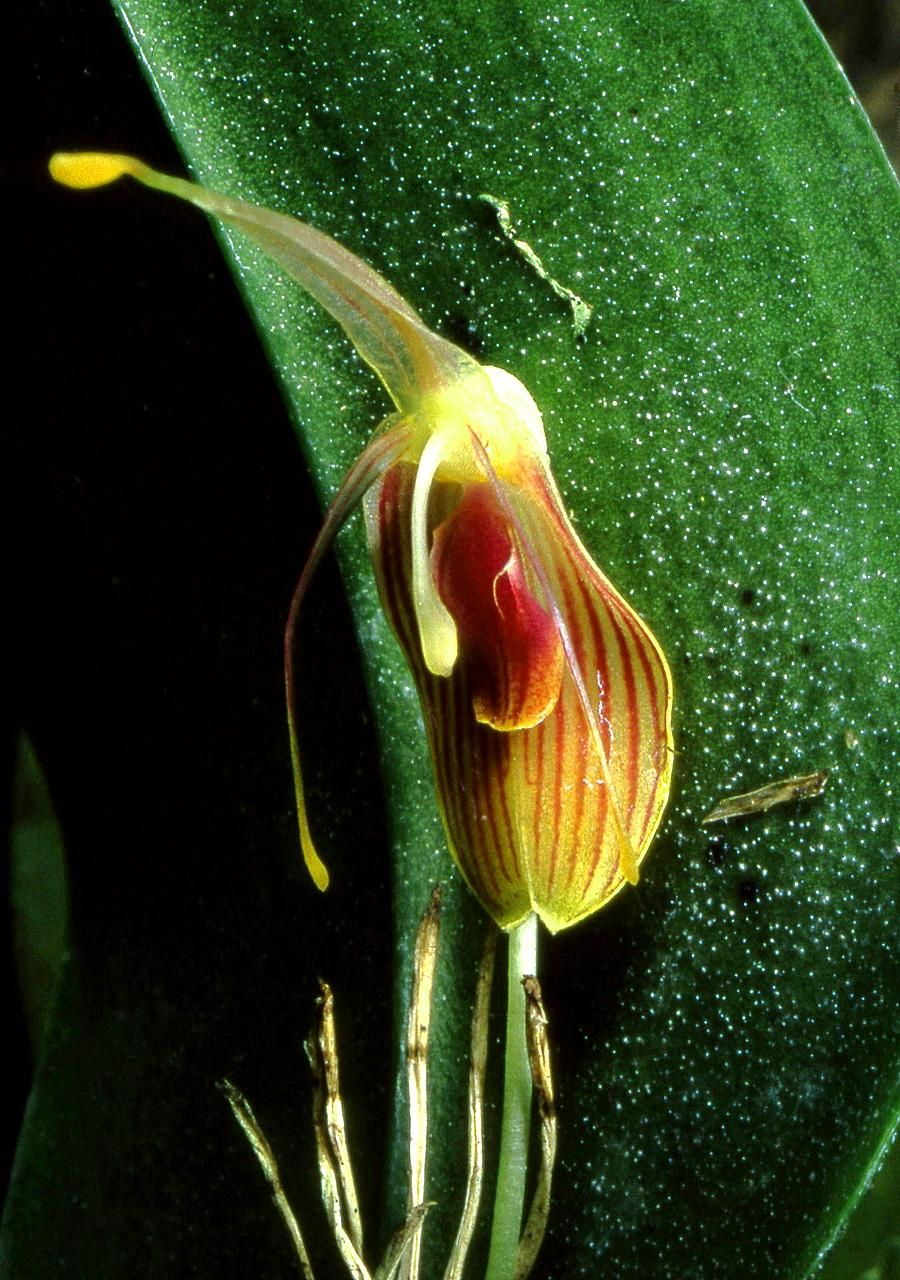
Restrepia flosculata

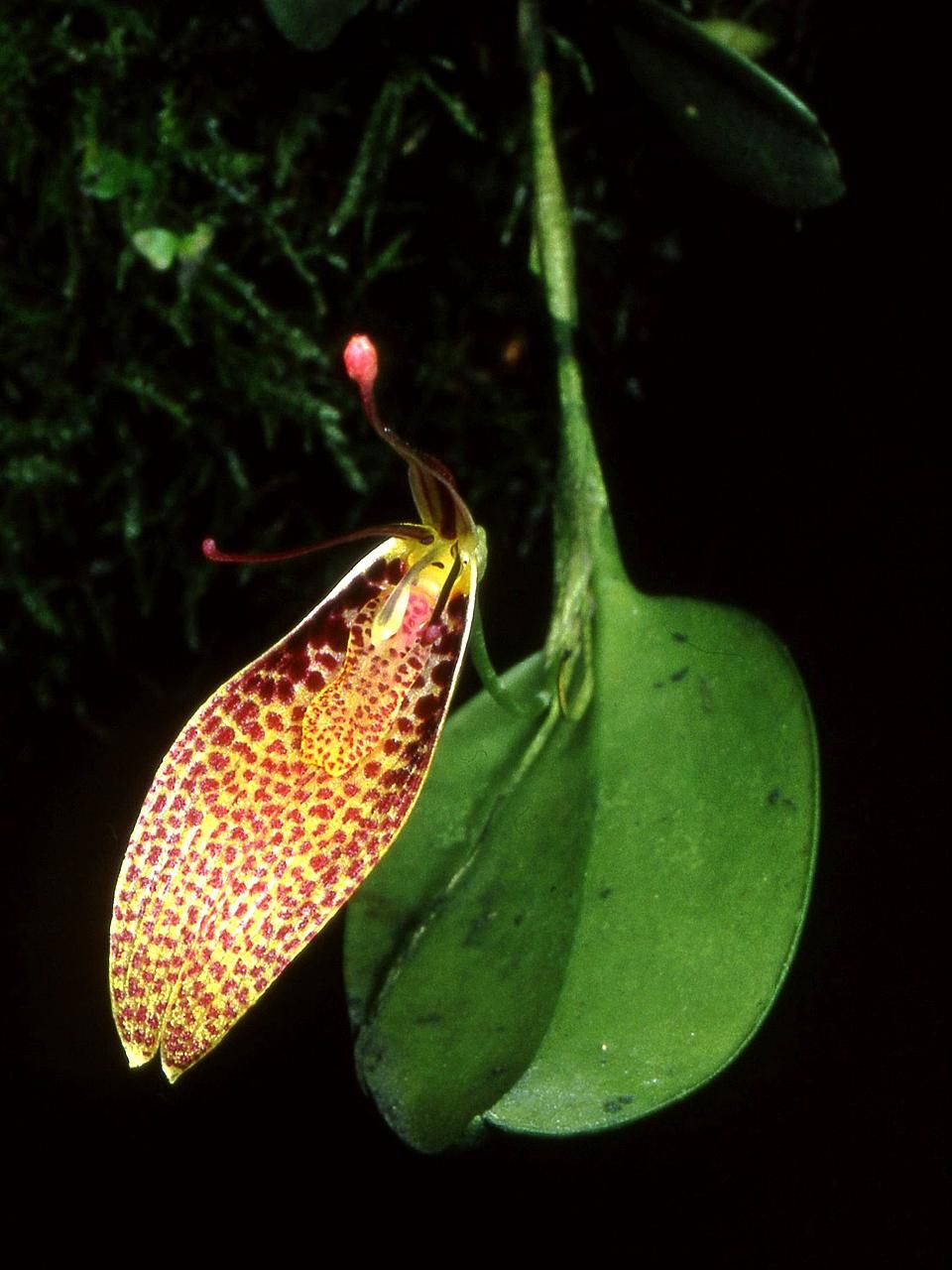
Restrepia guttulata

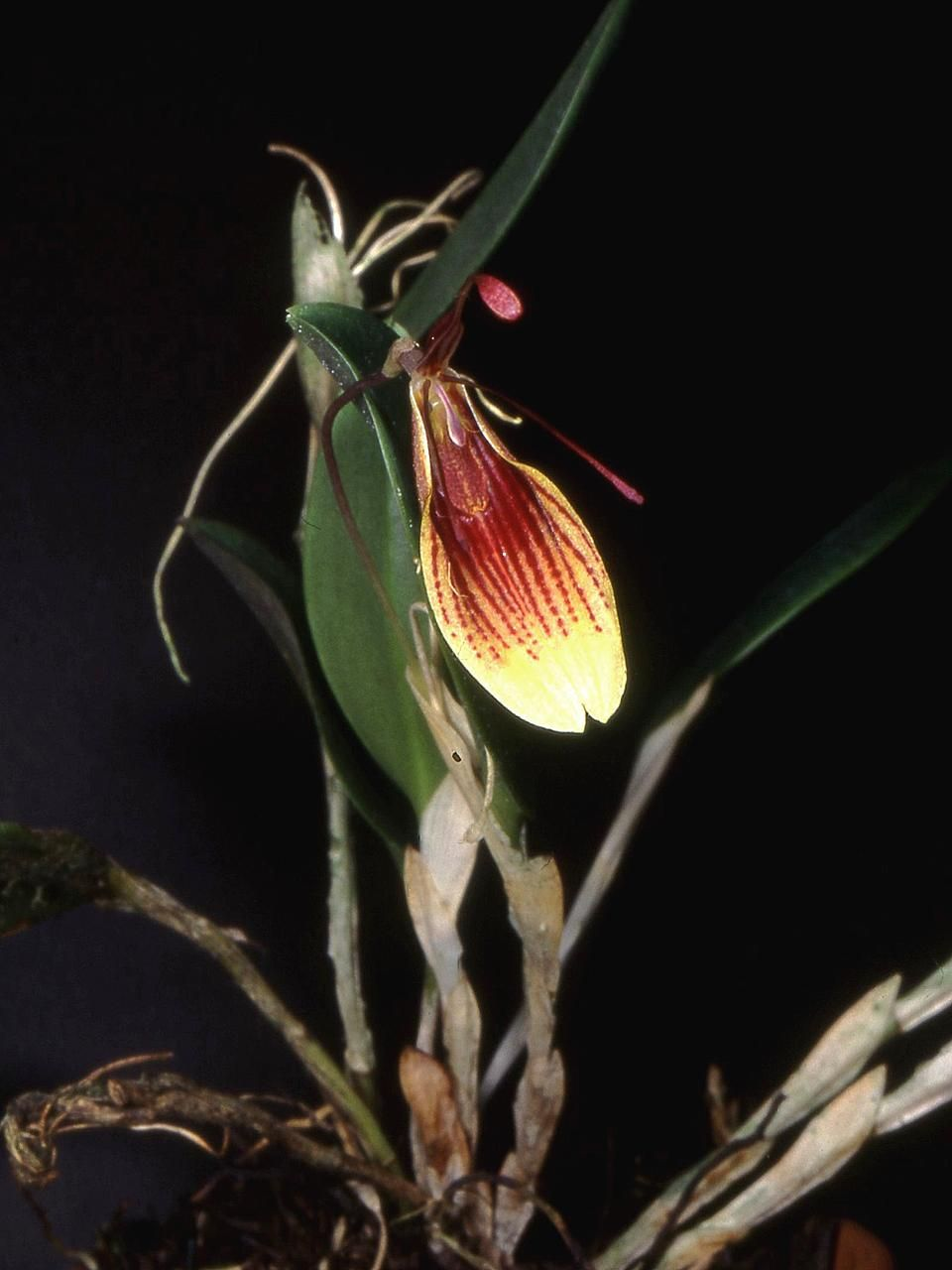
Restrepia iris

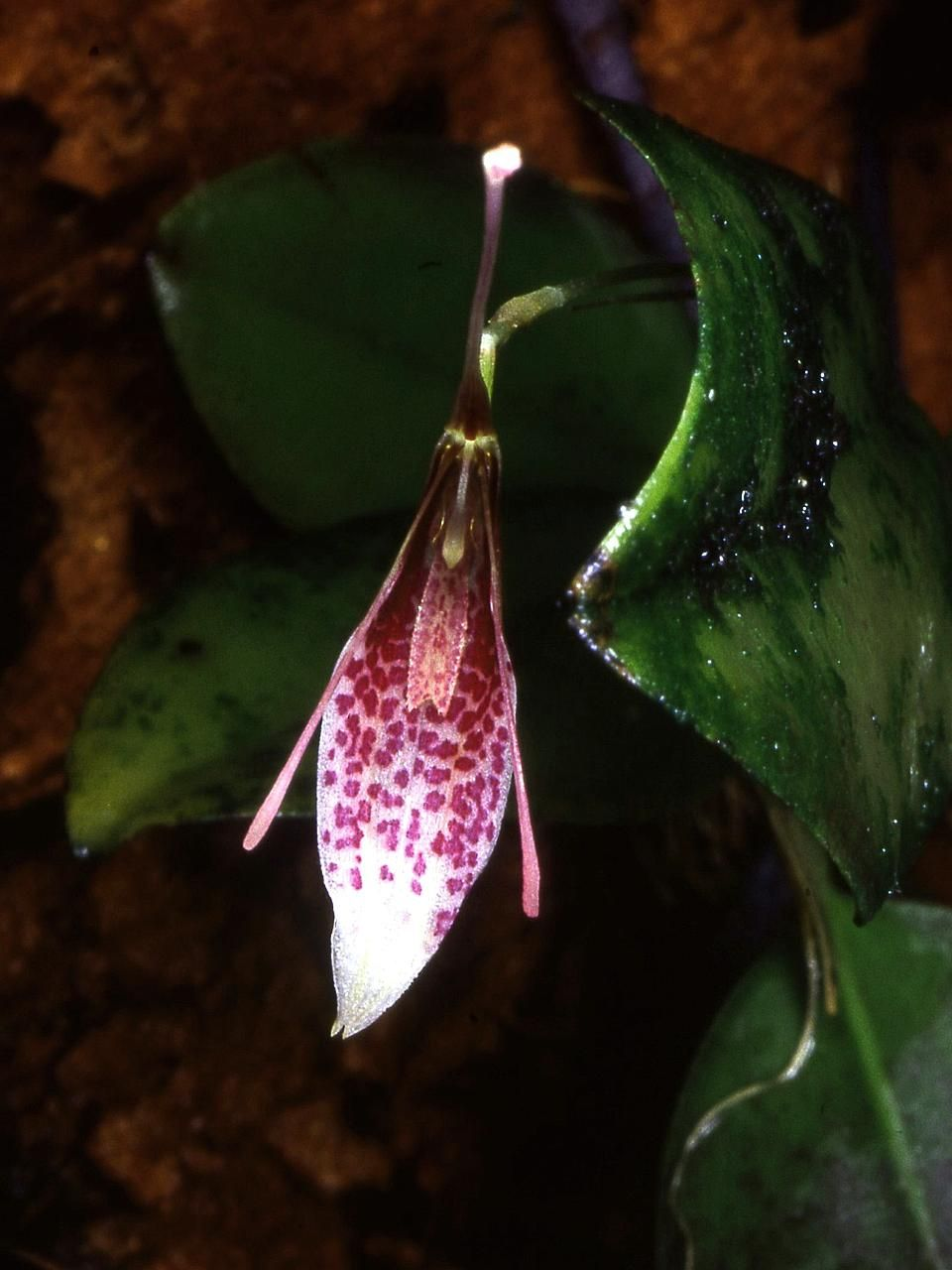
Restrepia lansbergii

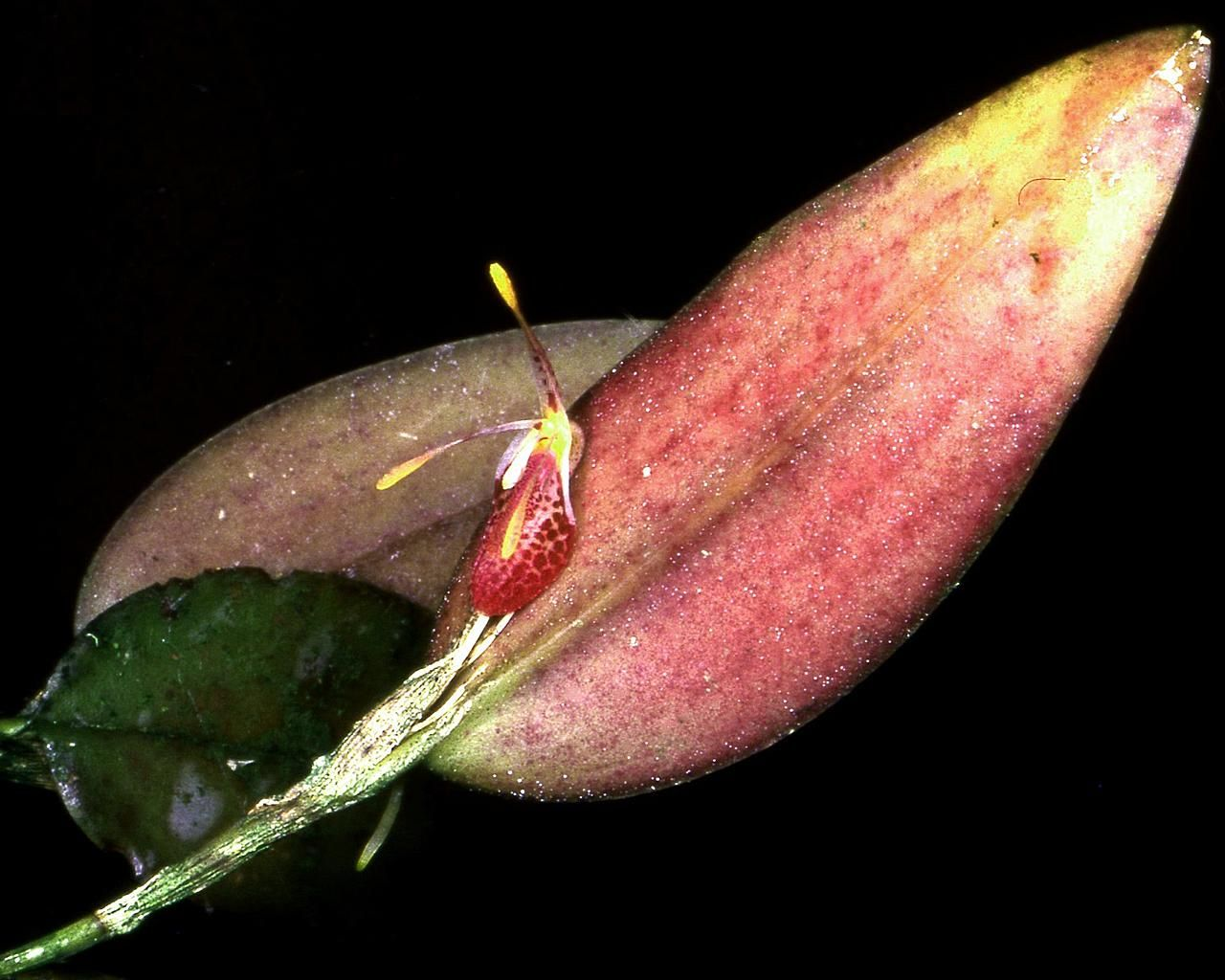
Restrepia muscifera

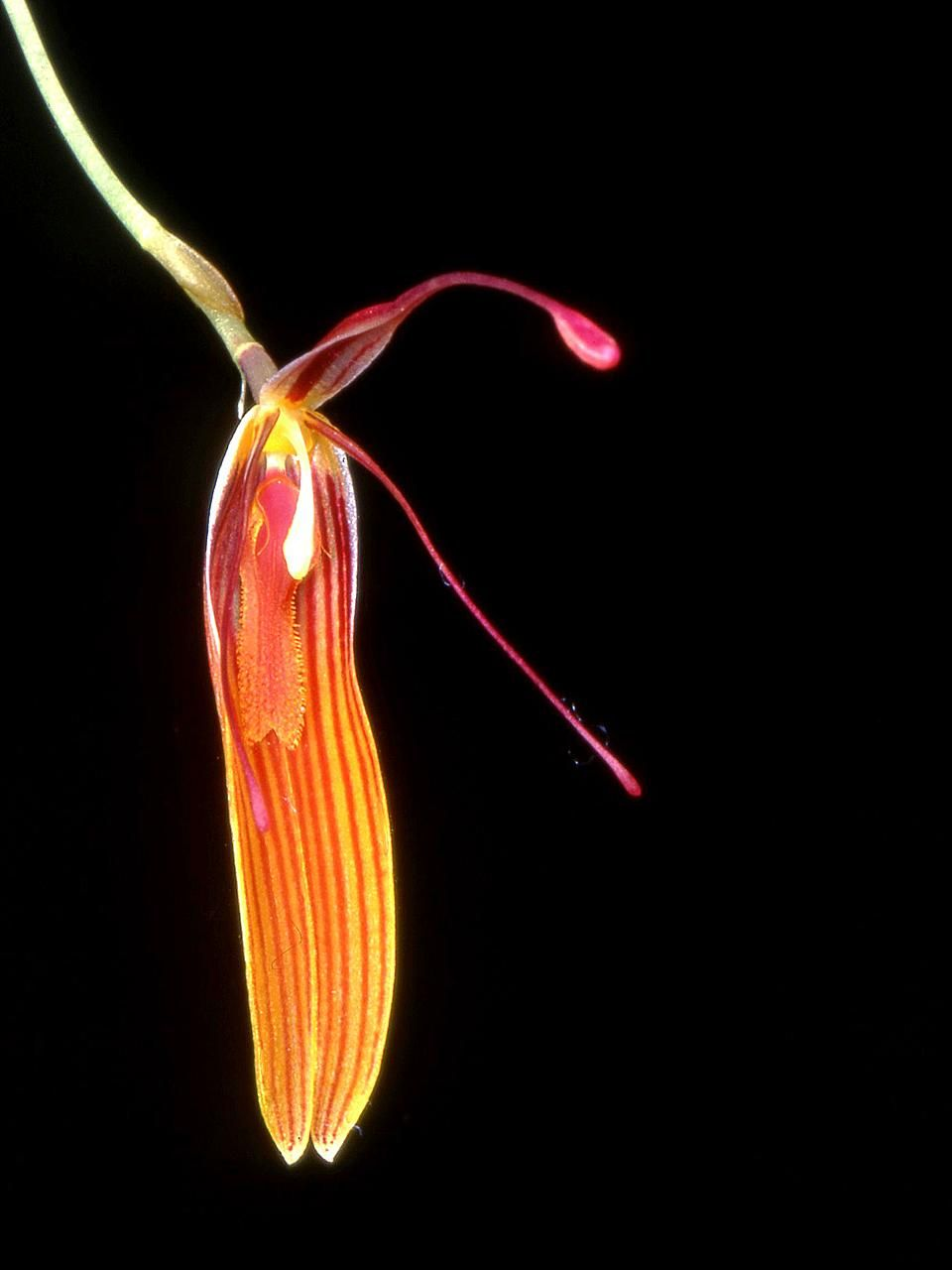
Restrepia nittiorhyncha

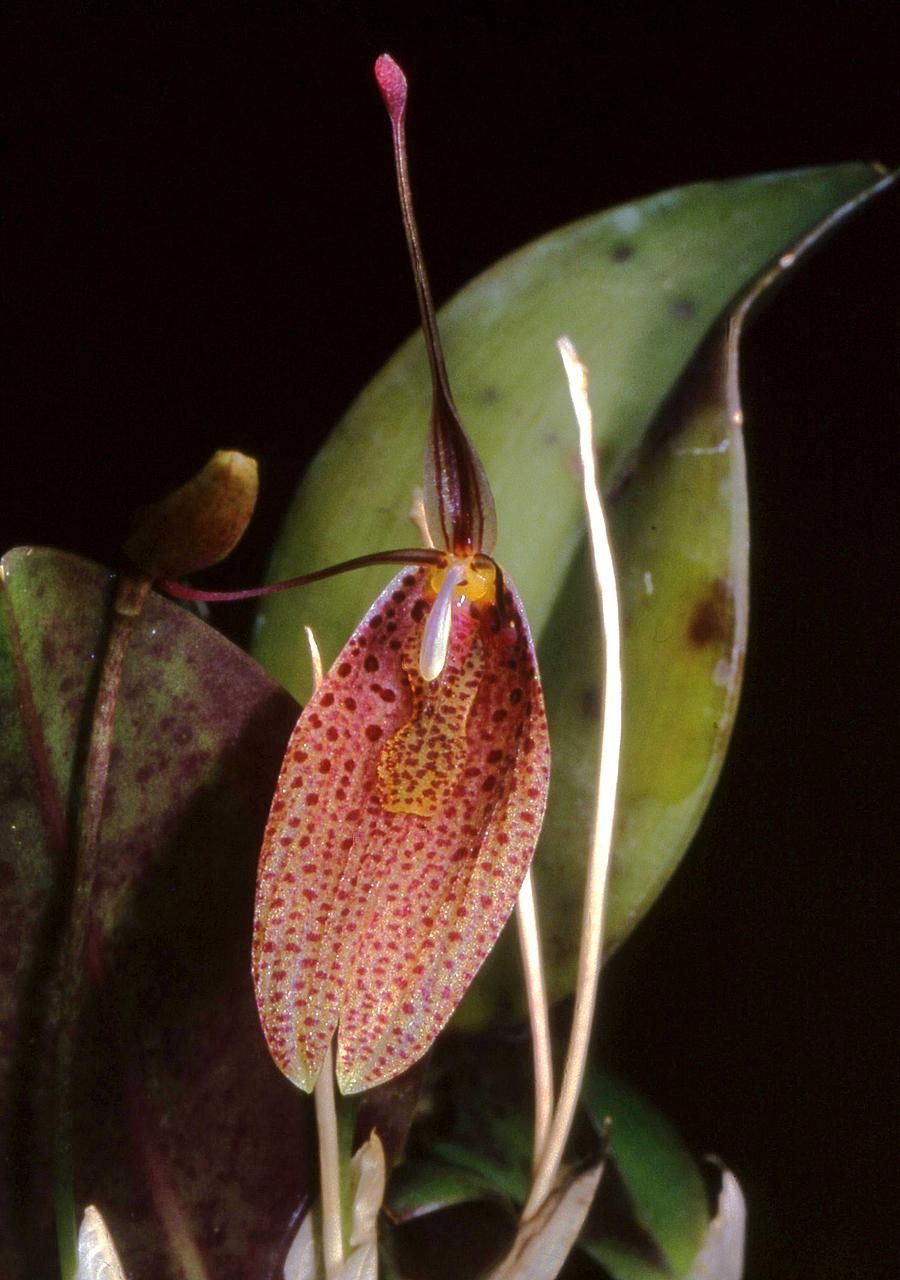
Restrepia pandurata

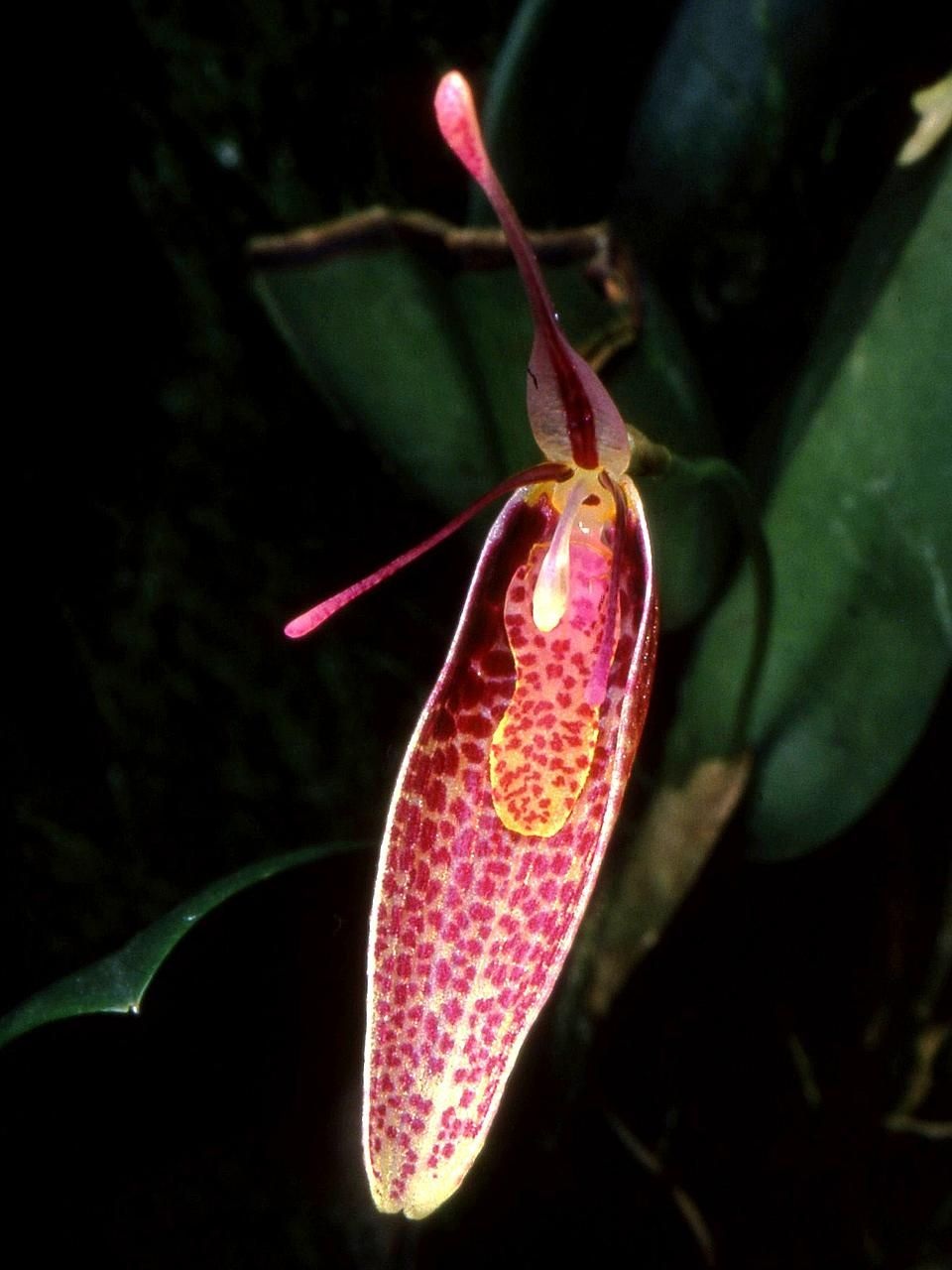
Restrepia roseola

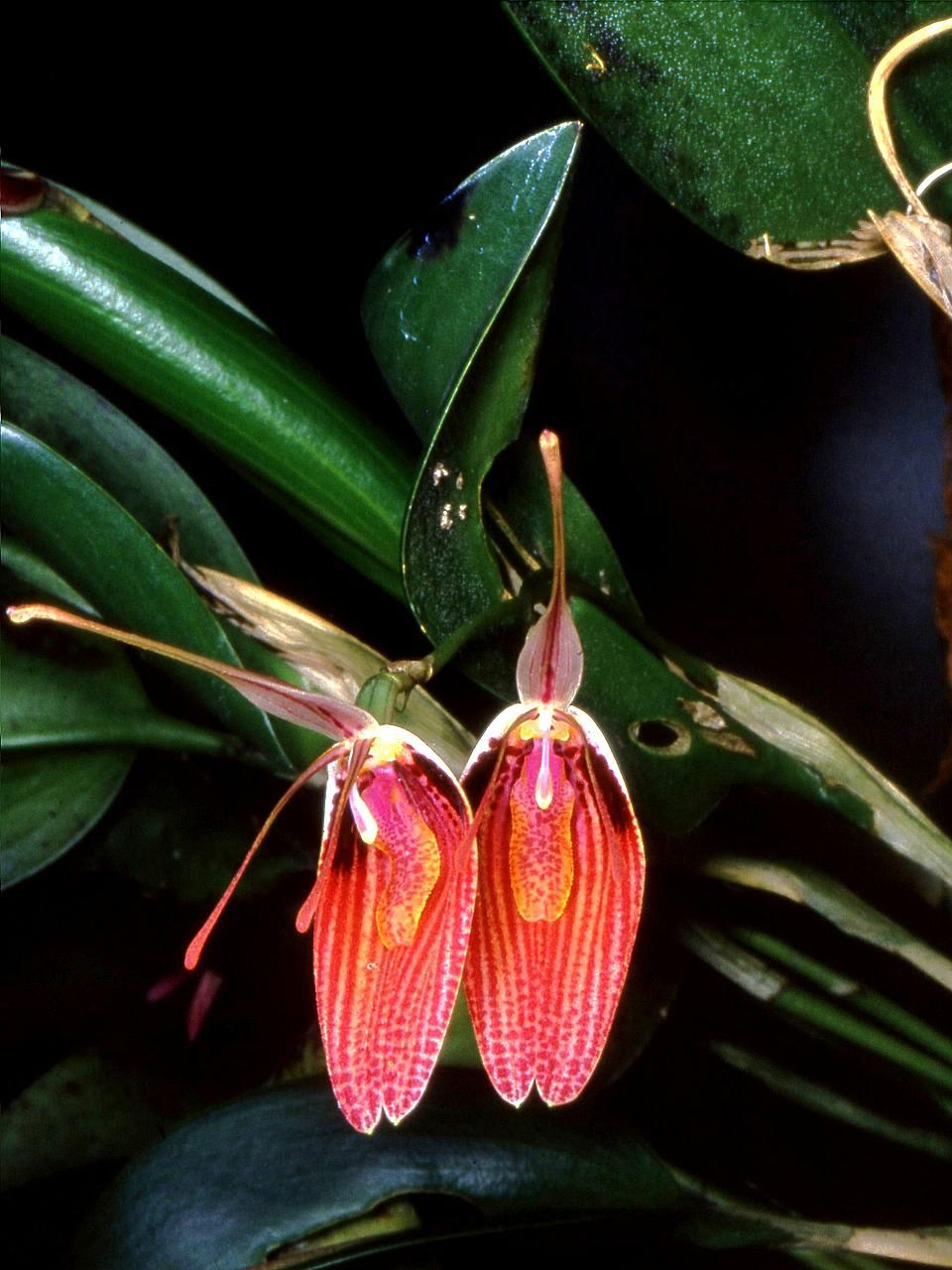
Restrepia sanguinea

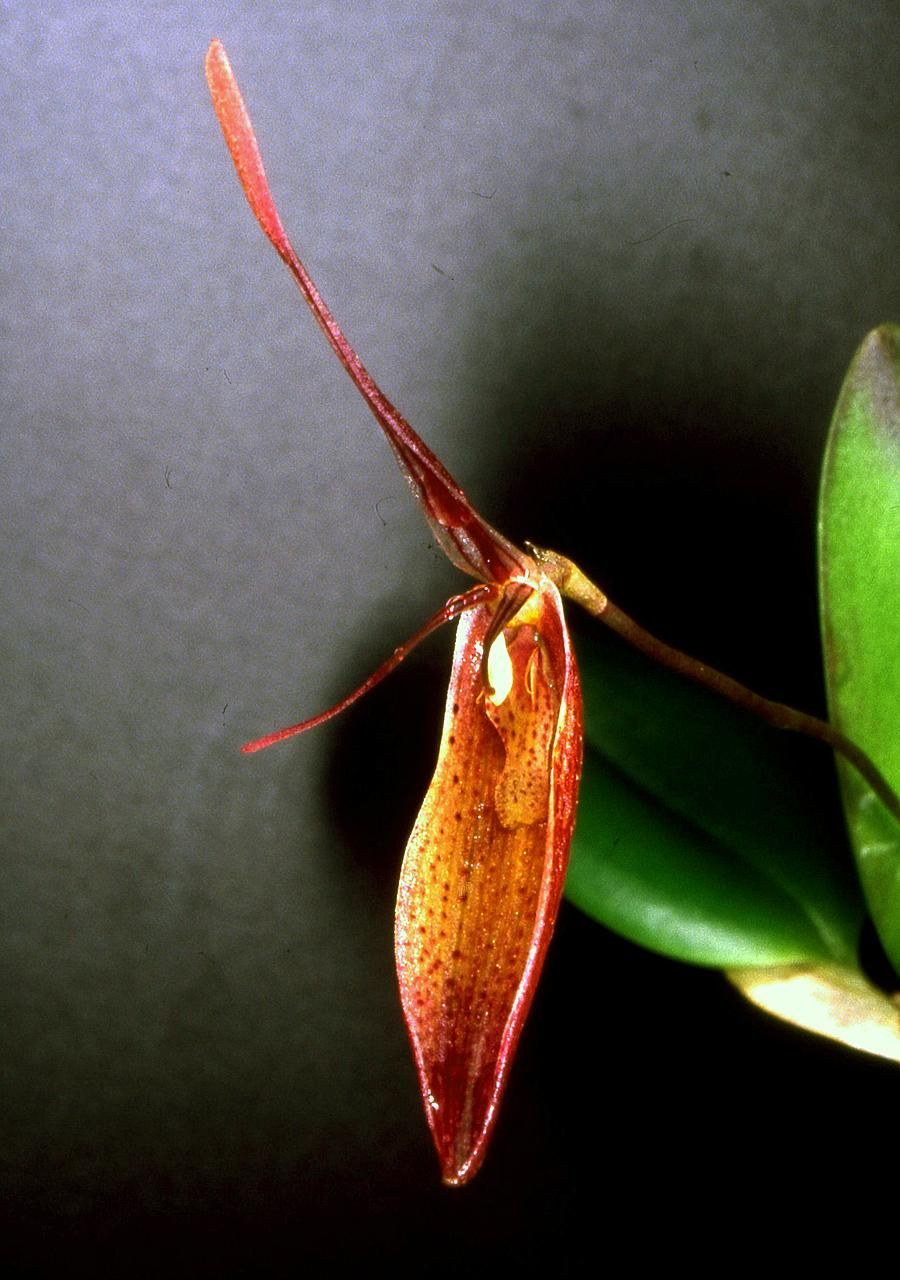
Restrepia teaguei

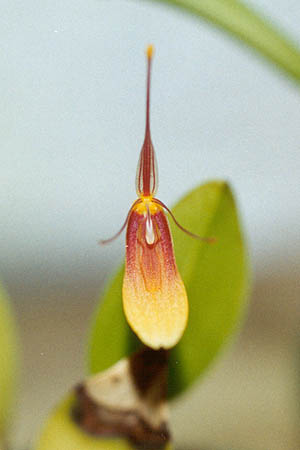
Restrepia trichoglossa

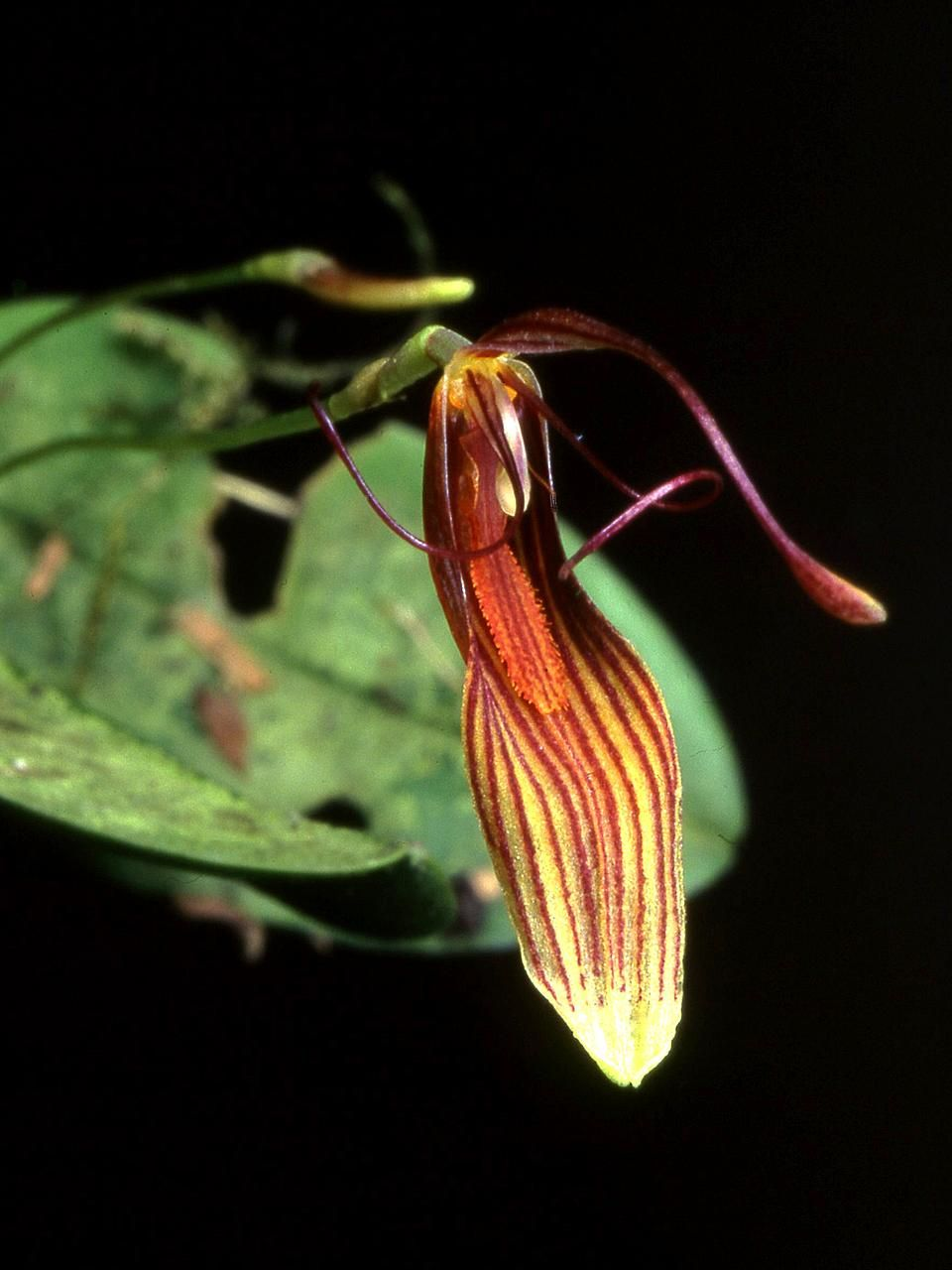
Restrepia wageneri

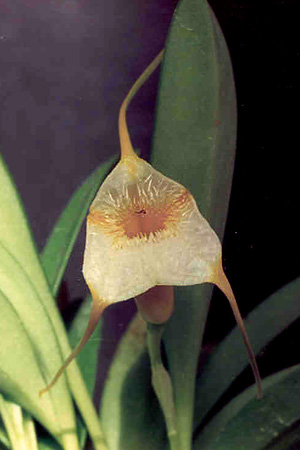
Masdevallia agaster

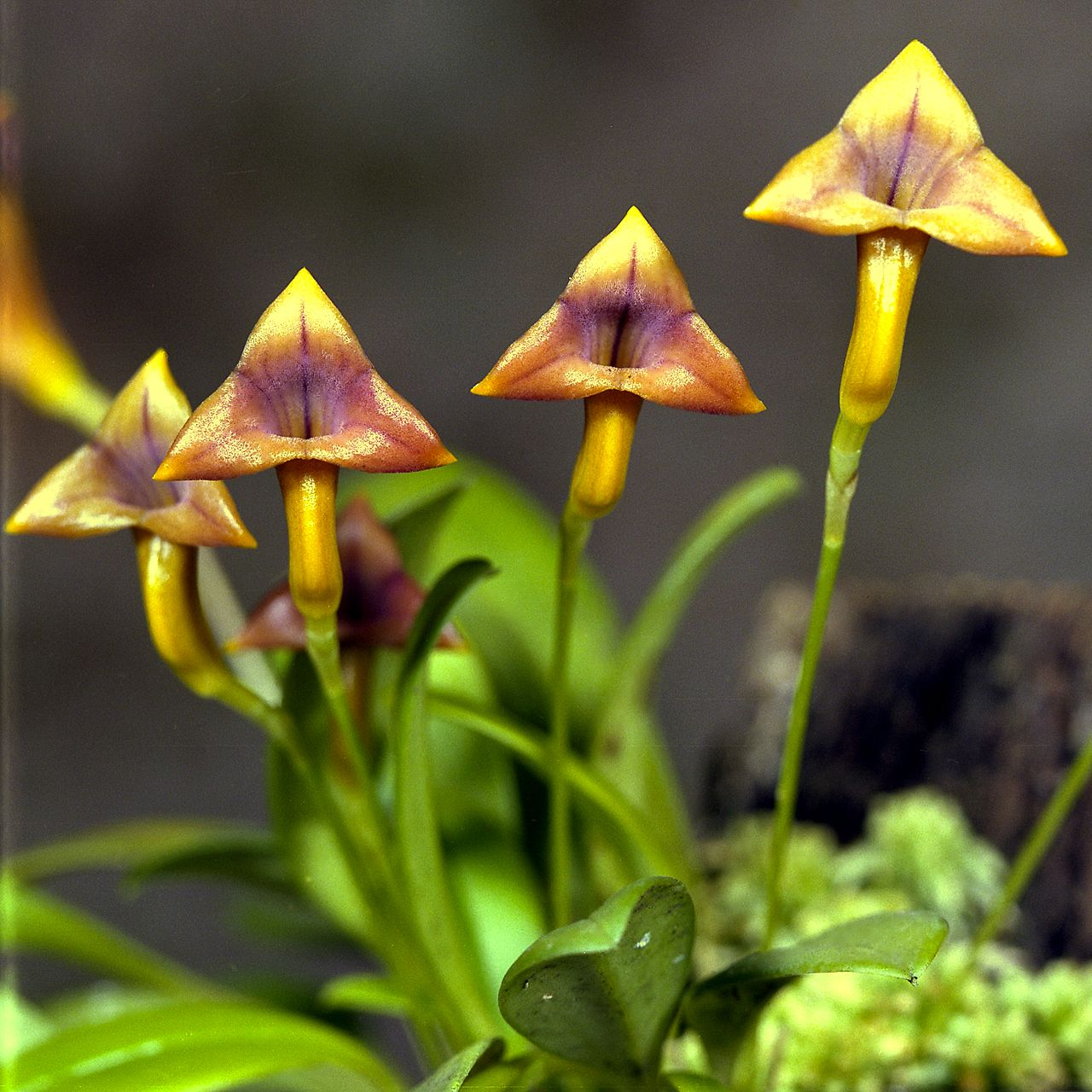
Masdevallia angulifera

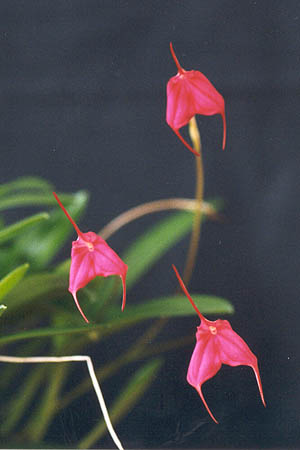
Masdevallia barlaeana

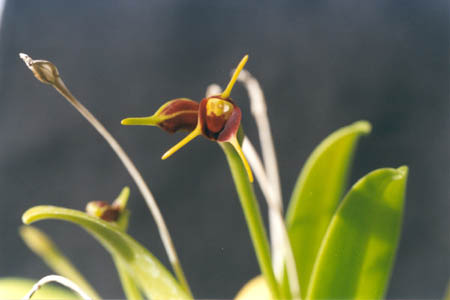
Masdevallia bicolor

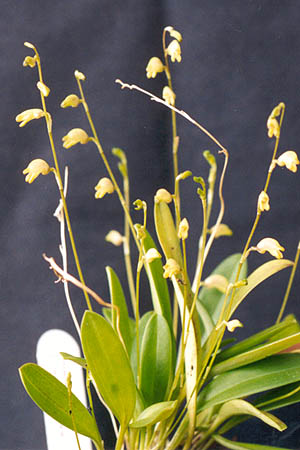
Masdevallia bulbophyllopsis

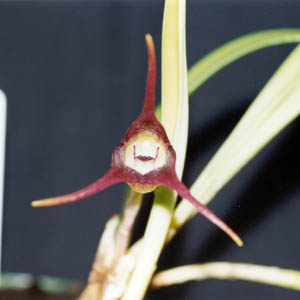
Masdevallia civilis

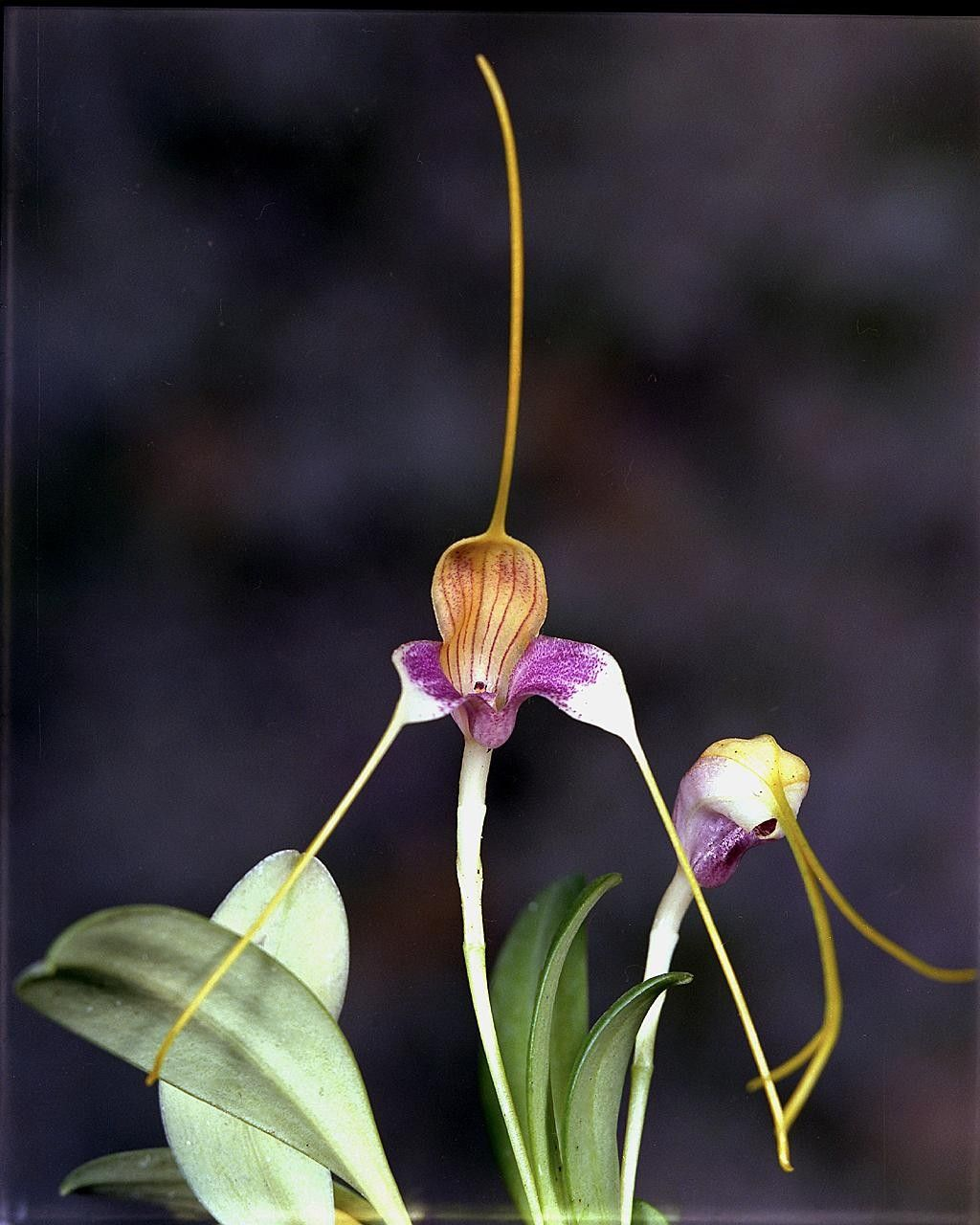
Masdevallia caudata

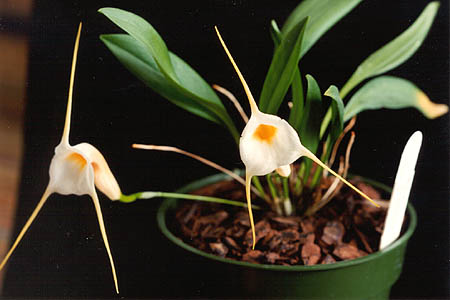
Masdevallia constricta

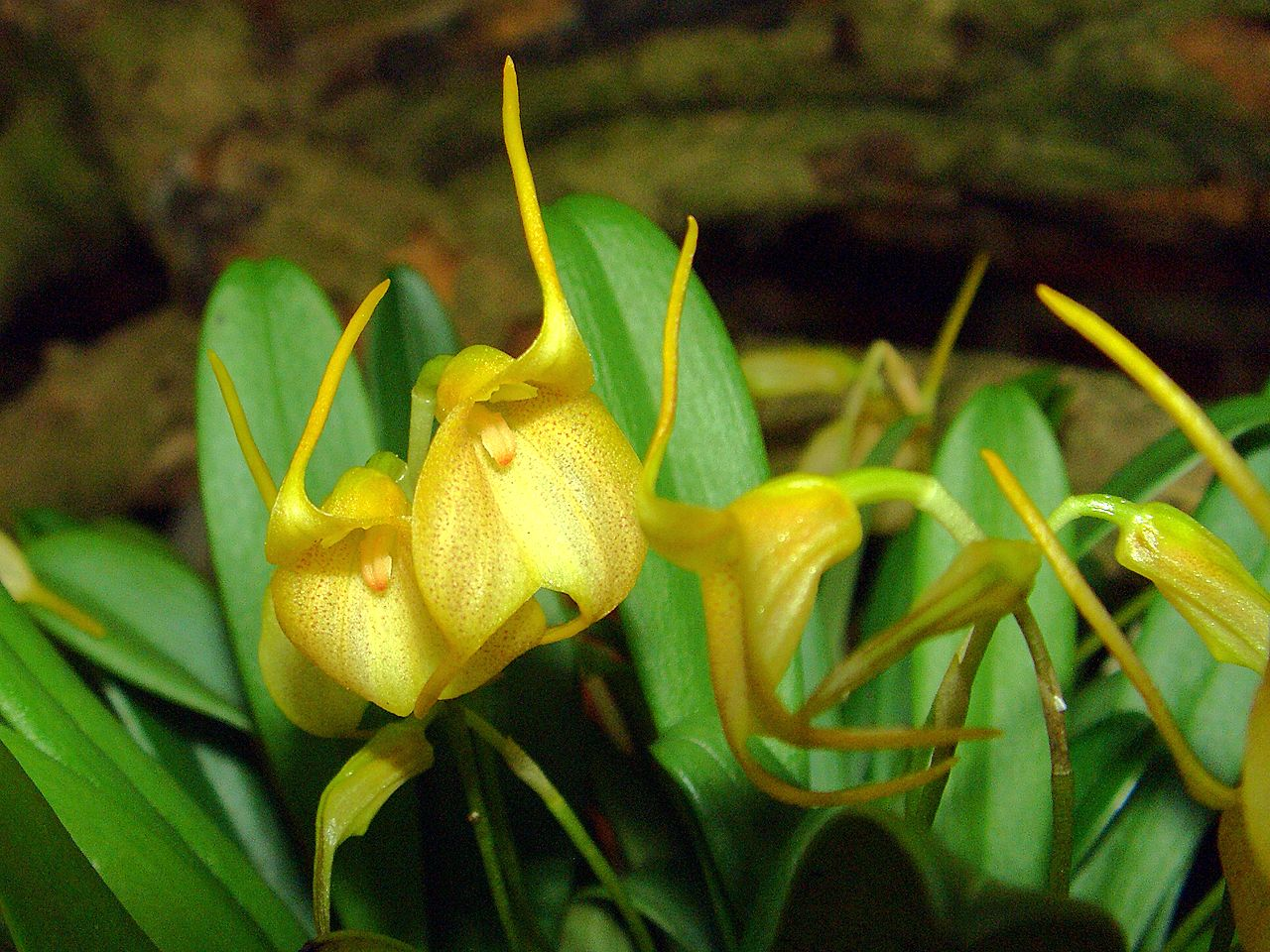
Masdevallia floribunda

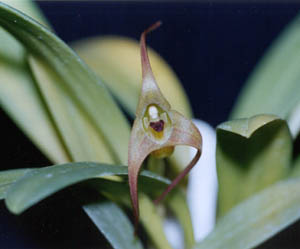
Masdevallia fractiflexa

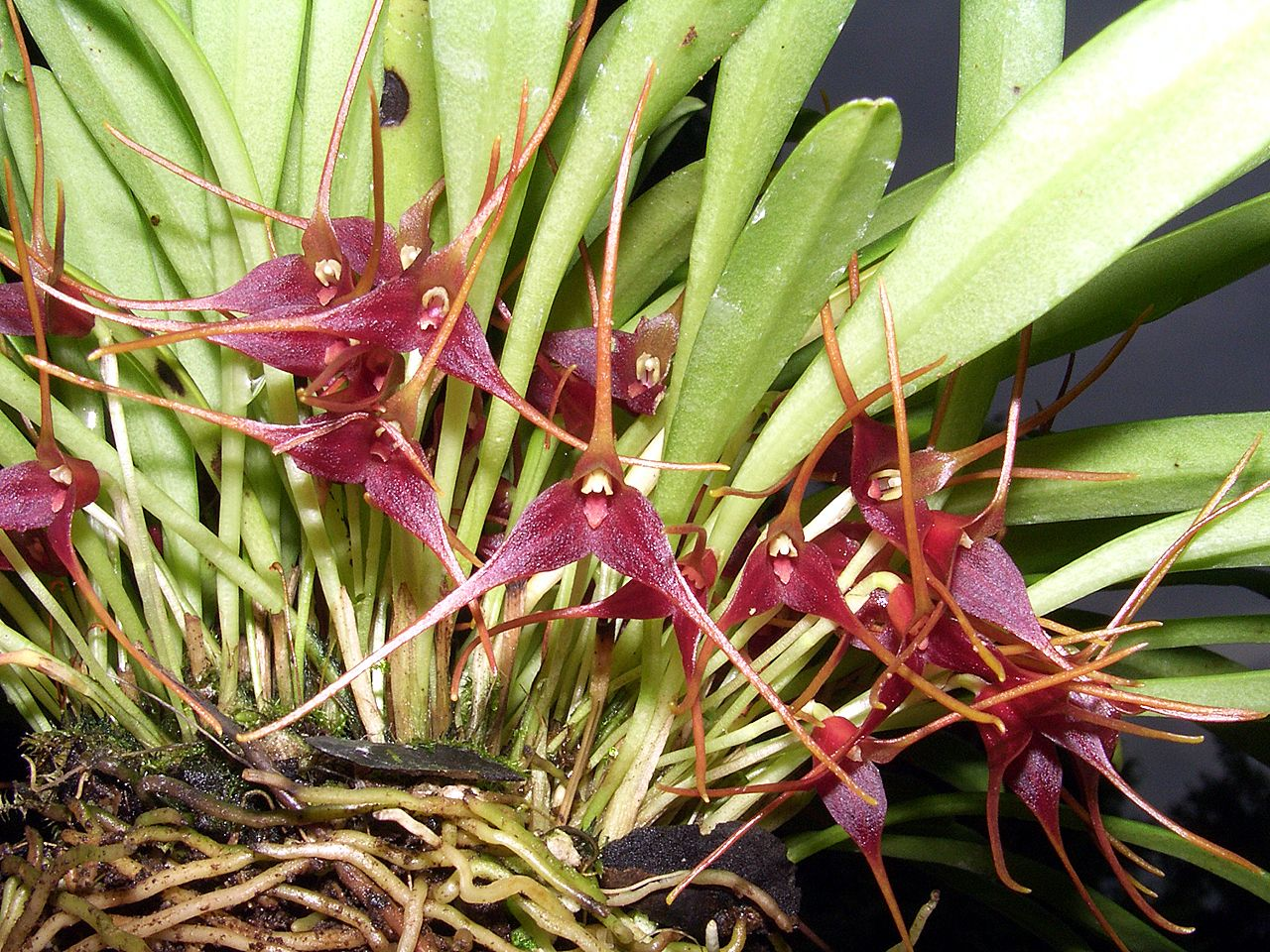
Masdevallia herradurae

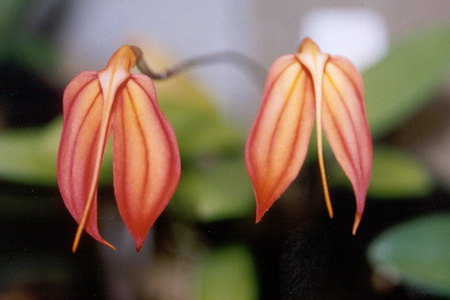
Masdevallia ignea

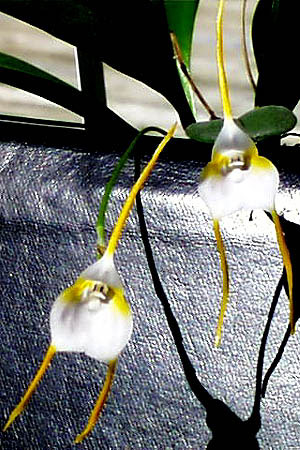
Masdevallia mejiana

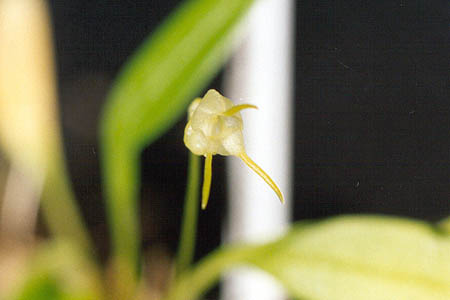
Masdevallia nidifica

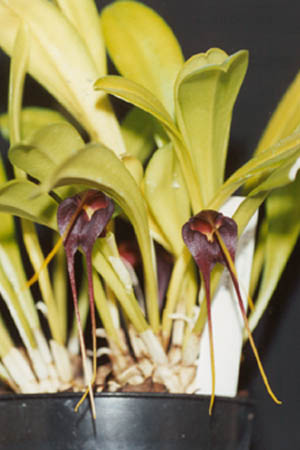
Masdevallia rolfeana

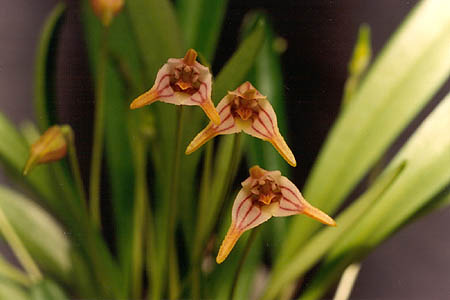
Masdevallia striatella

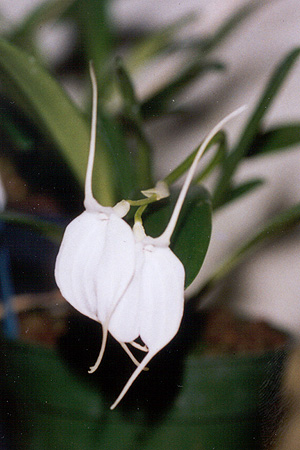
Masdevallia tovarensis

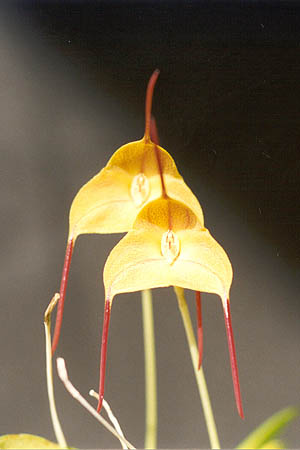
Masdevallia triangularis

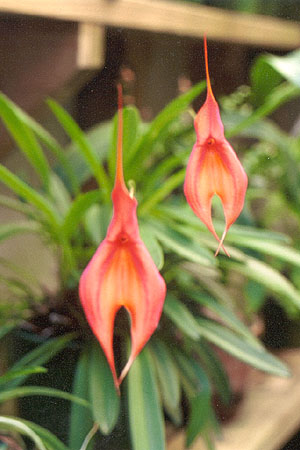
Masdevallia veitchiana

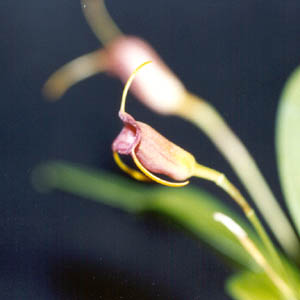
Masdevallia ventricularia

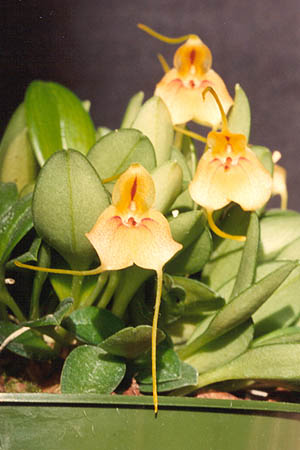
Masdevallia wageneriana

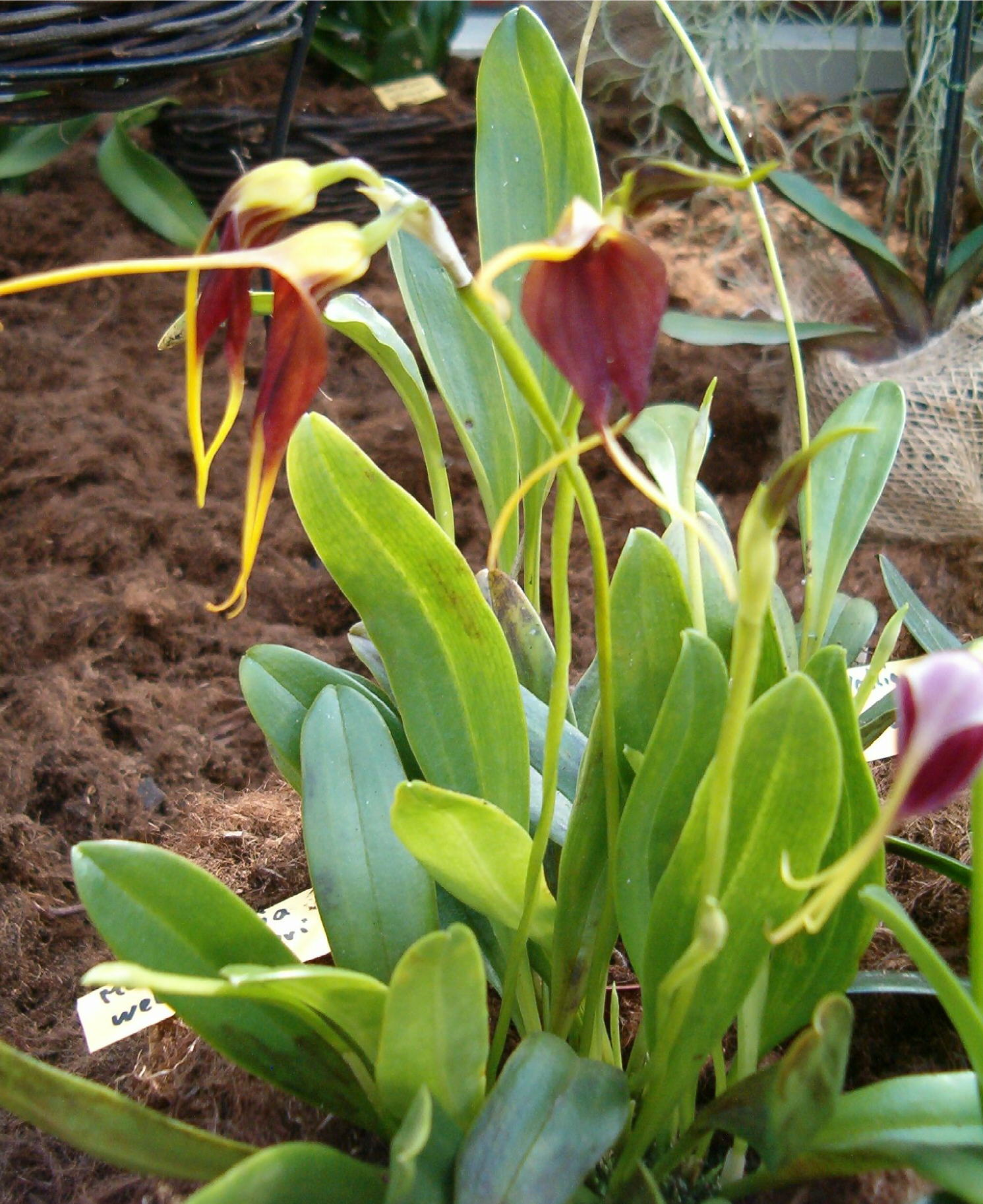
Masdevallia weberbaueri

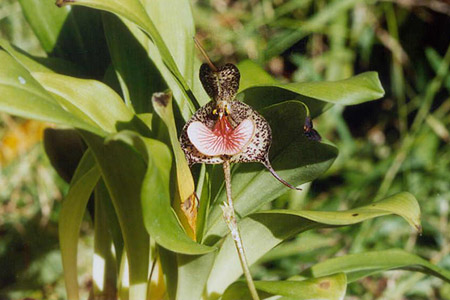
Dracula chestertonii

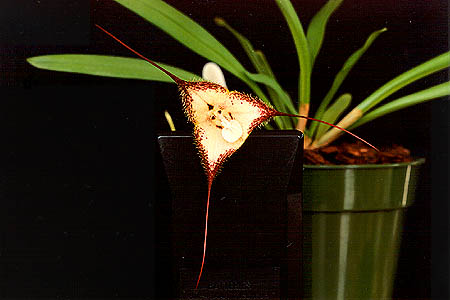
Dracula cordobae

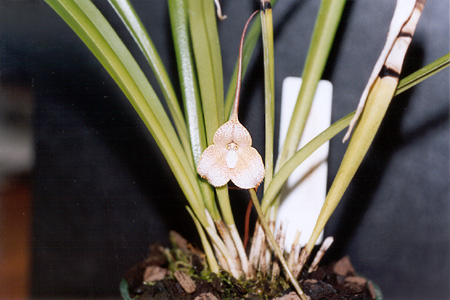
Dracula houtteana

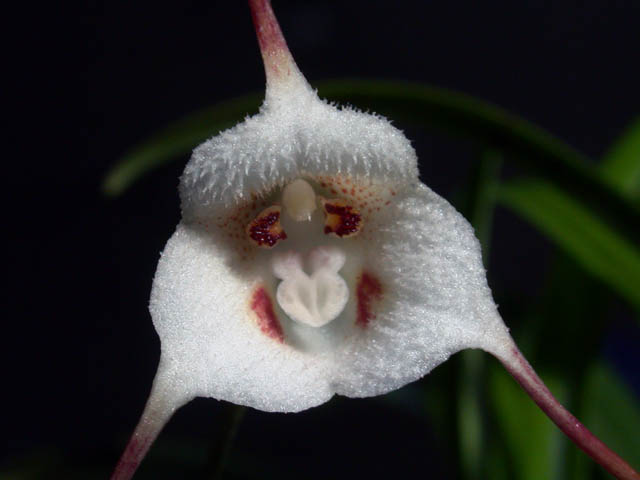
Dracula lotax

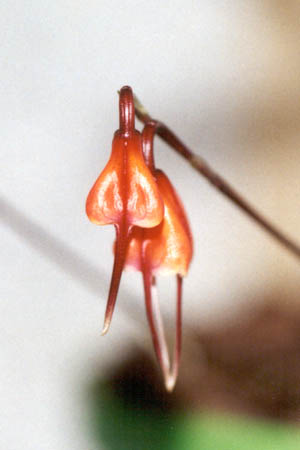
Dracula sodiroi

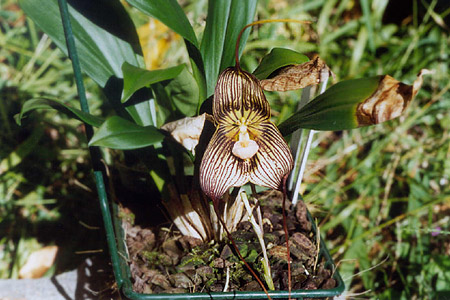
Dracula vampira

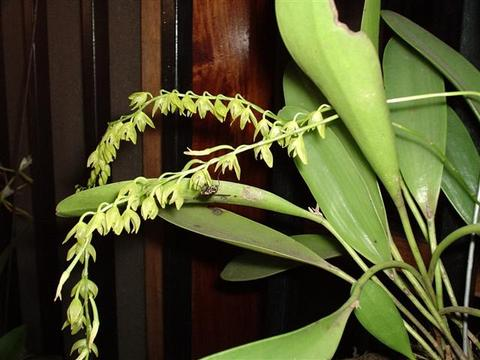
Pleurothallis racemiflora

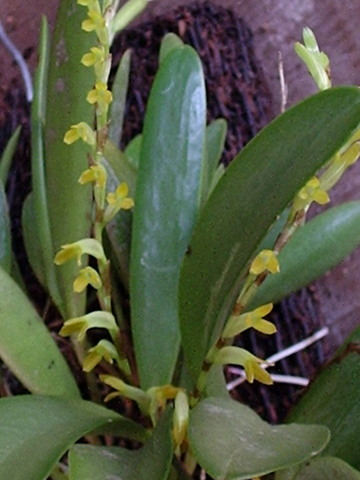
Pleurothallis tubata

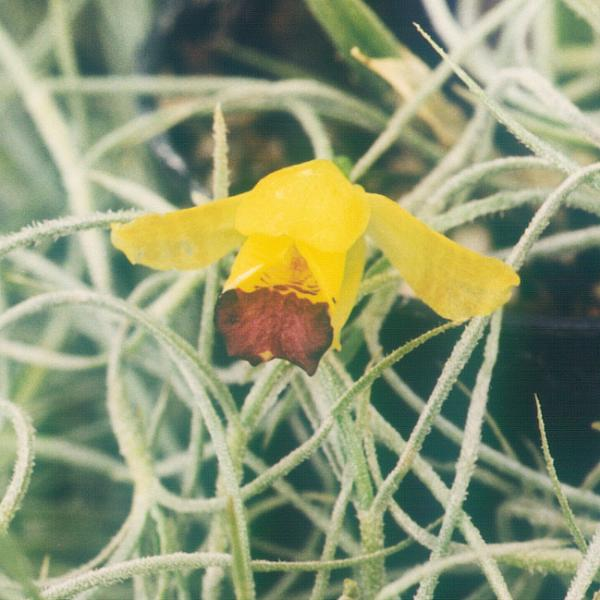
Oncidium brunleesianum

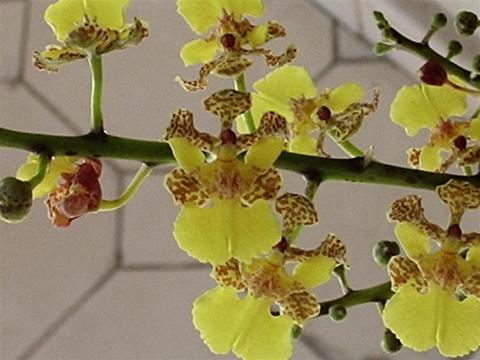
Oncidium cebolleta

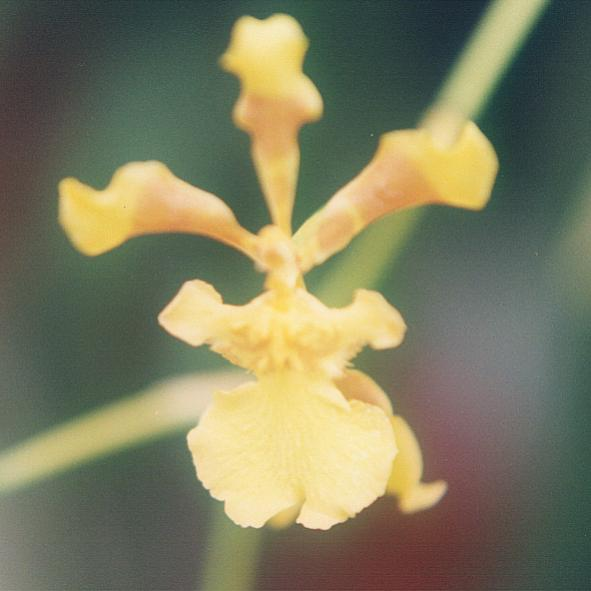
Oncidium croesus

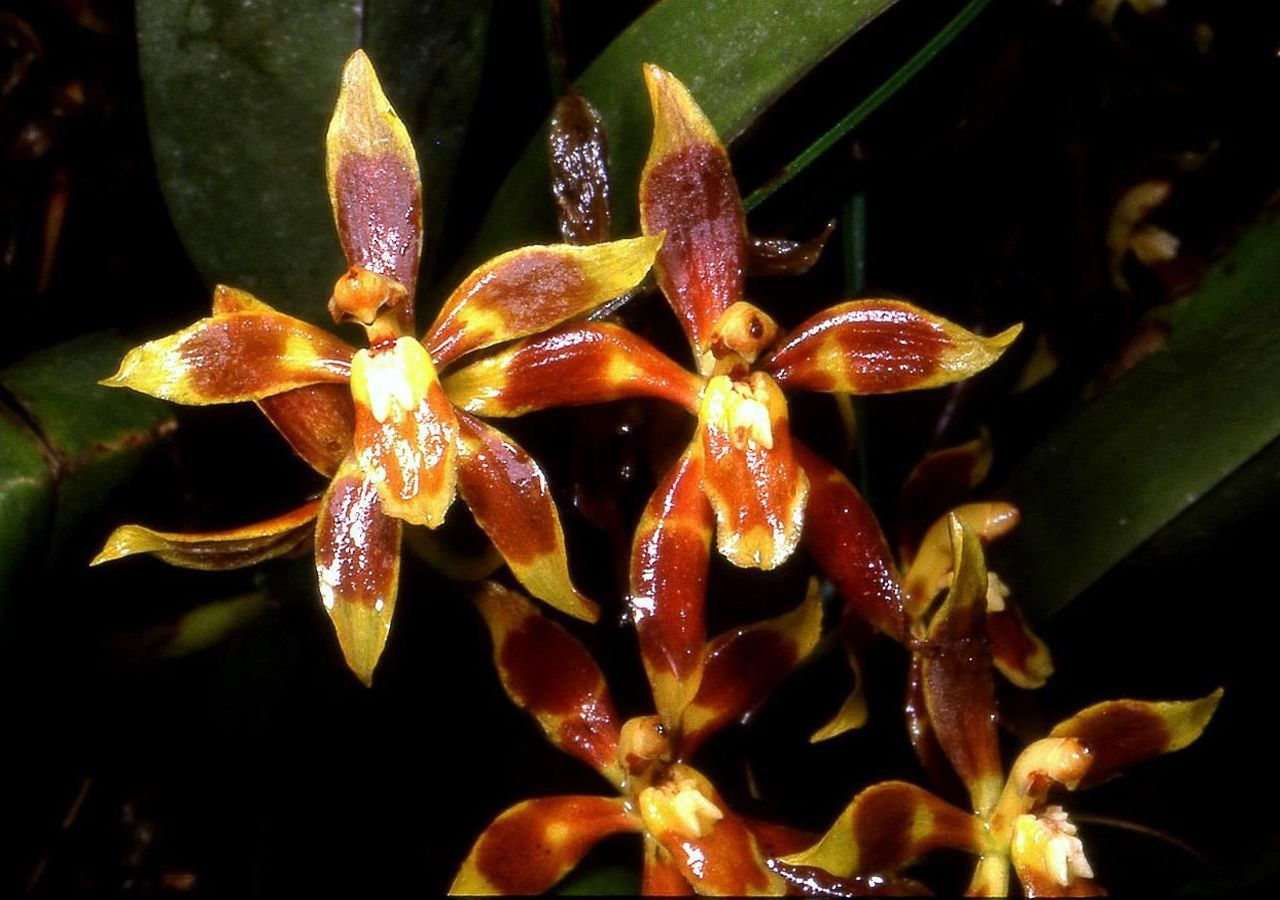
Oncidium cruentoides

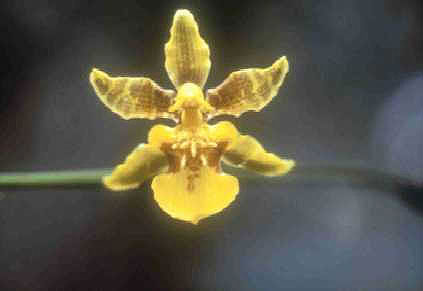
Oncidium ensatum

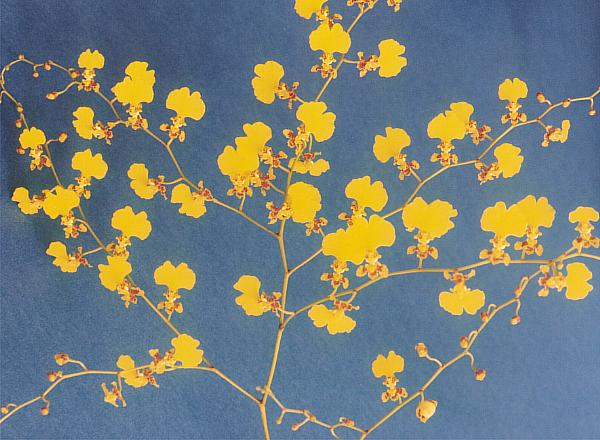
Oncidium flexuosum

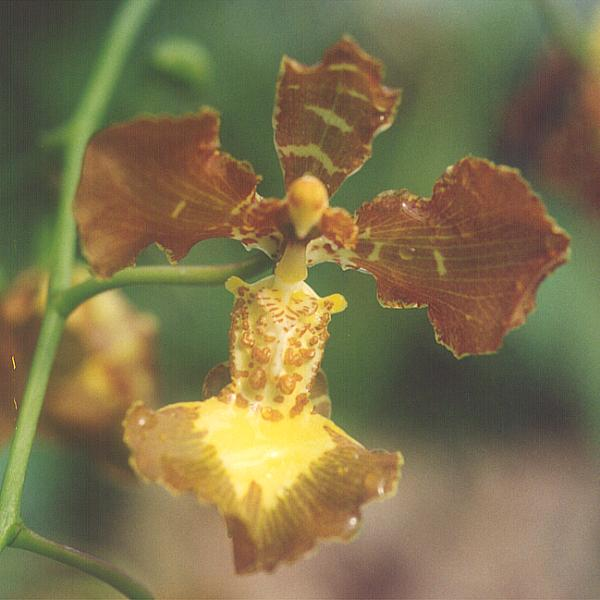
Oncidium forbesii

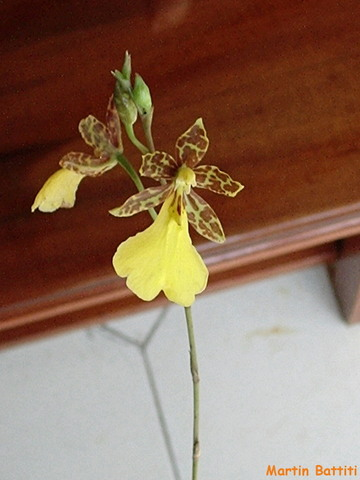
Oncidium graminifolium

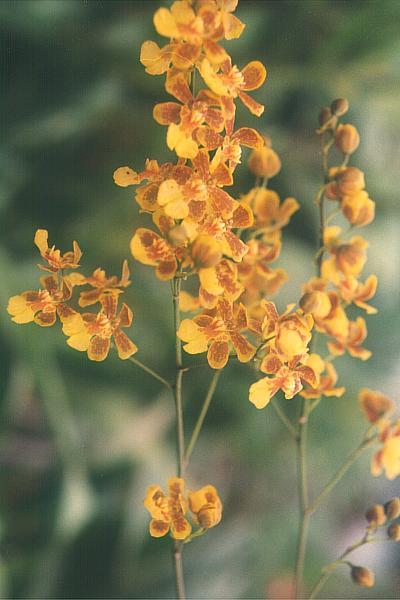
Oncidium harrisonianum

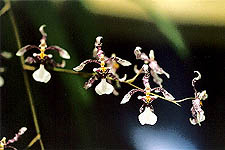
Oncidium incurvum

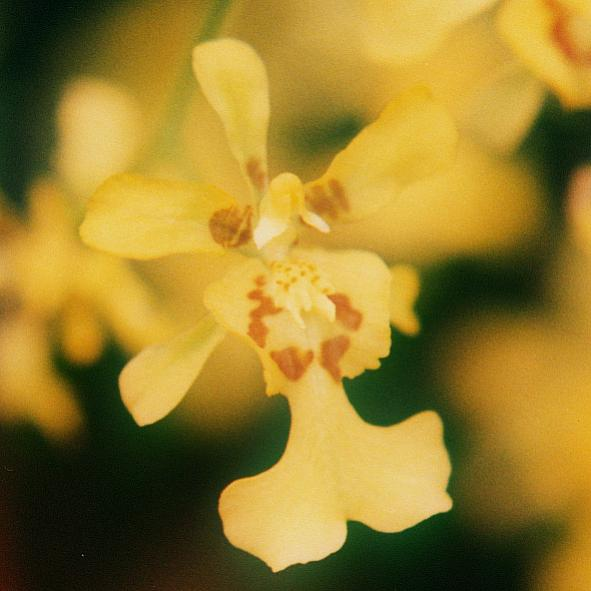
Oncidium klotzschianum

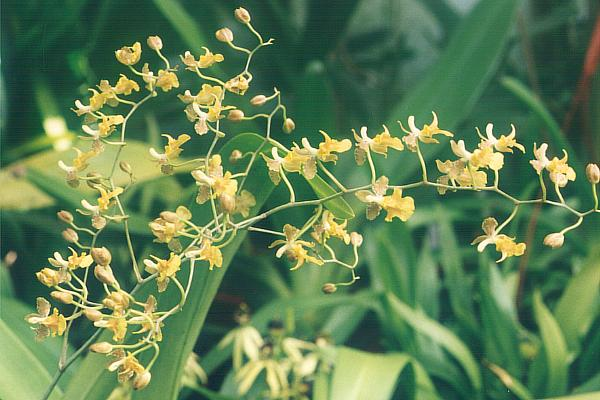
Oncidium longicornu

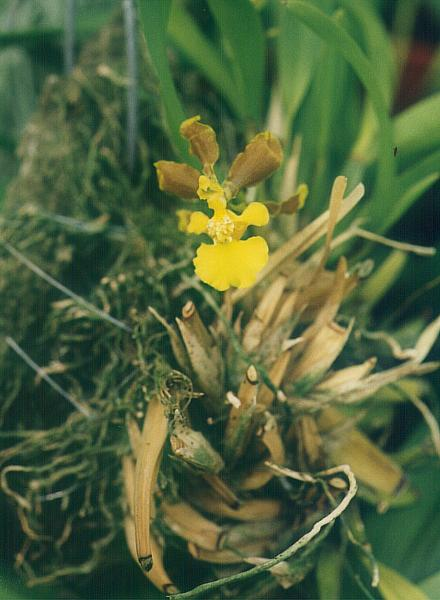
Oncidium longipes

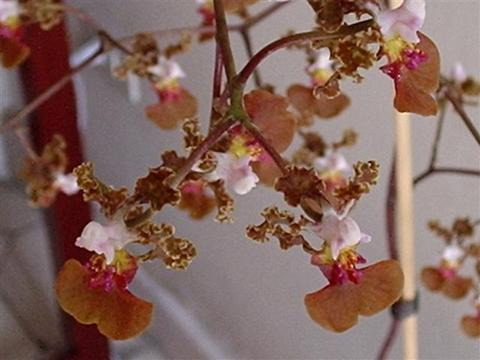
Oncidium luridum

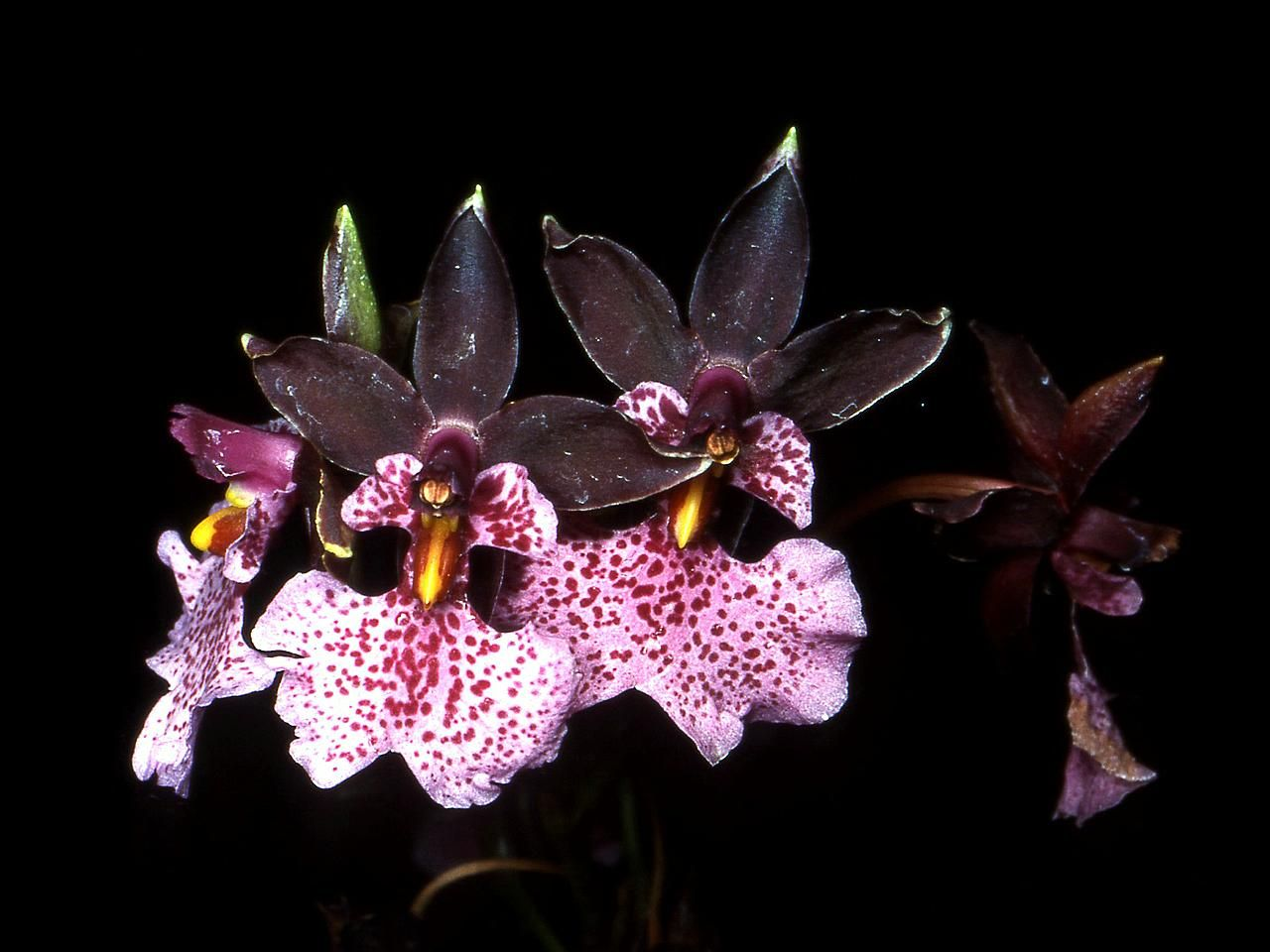
Oncidium nubigenum

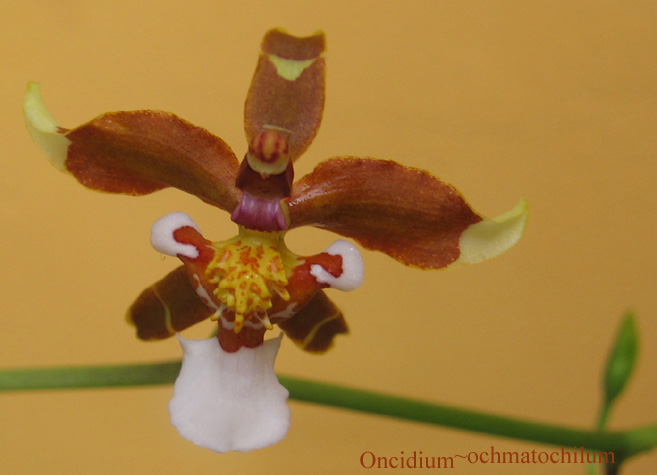
Oncidium ochmatochilum

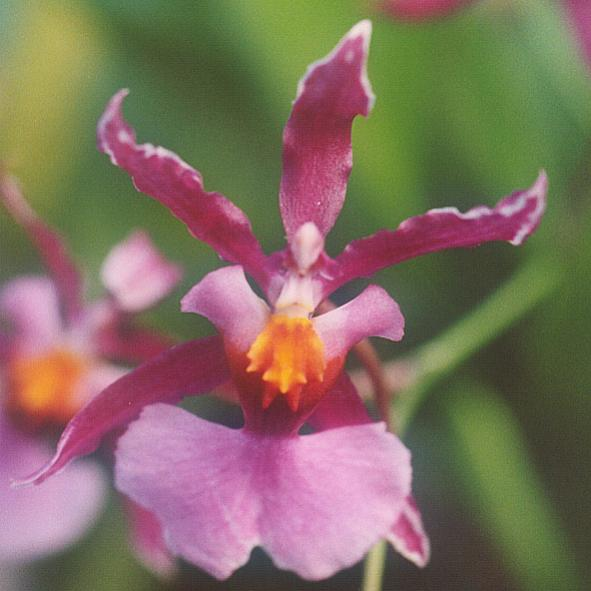
Oncidium ornithorhynchum

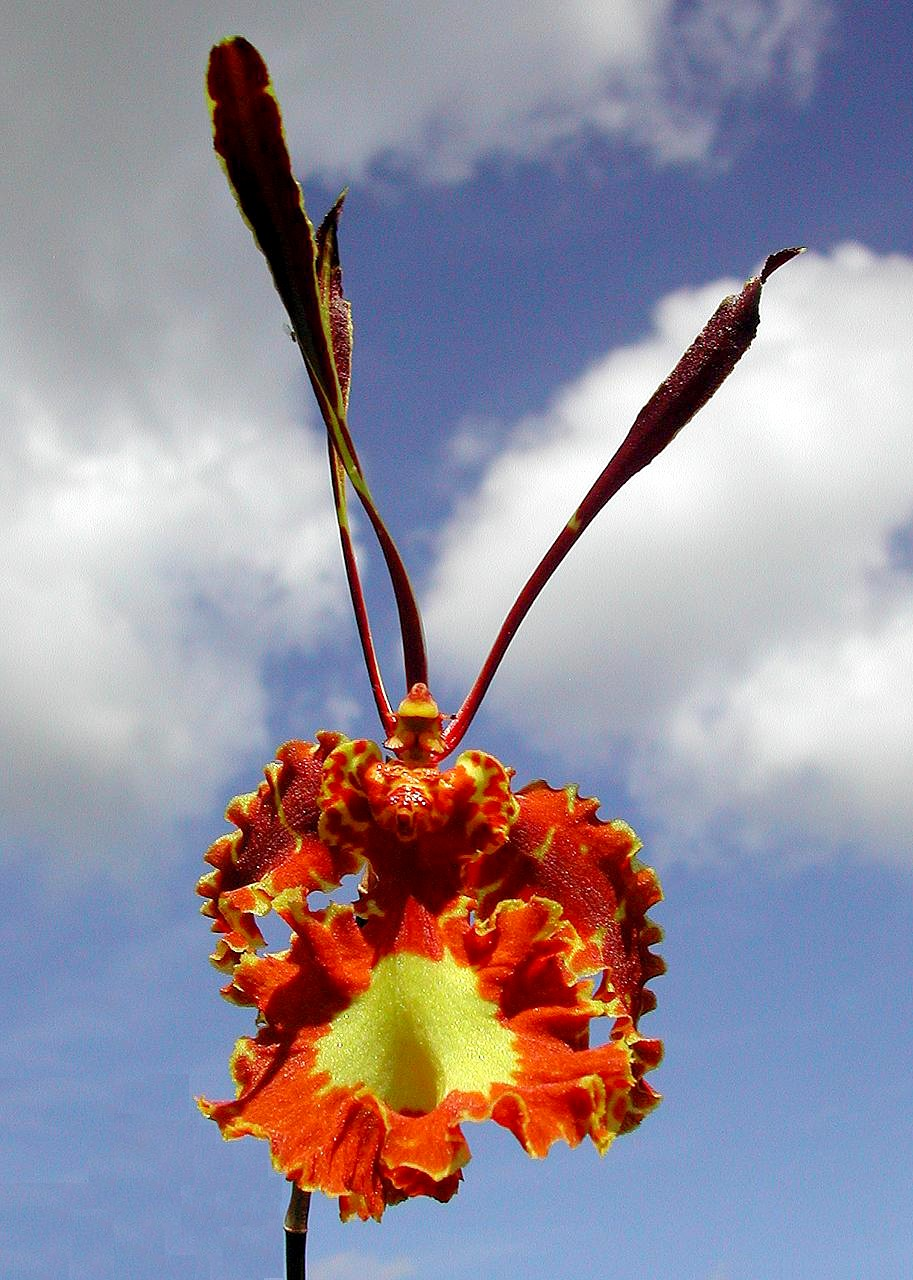
Oncidium papilio

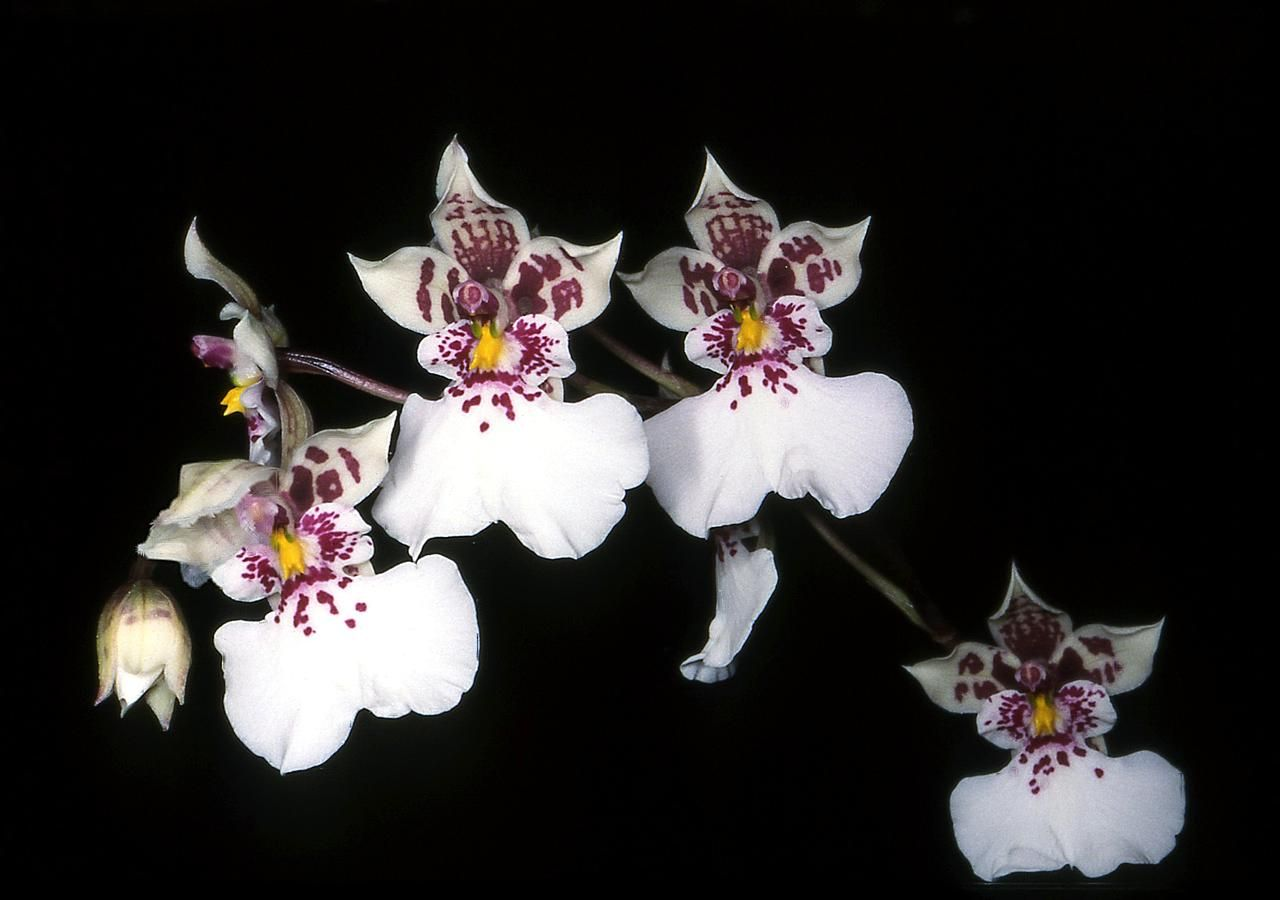
Oncidium phalaenopsis

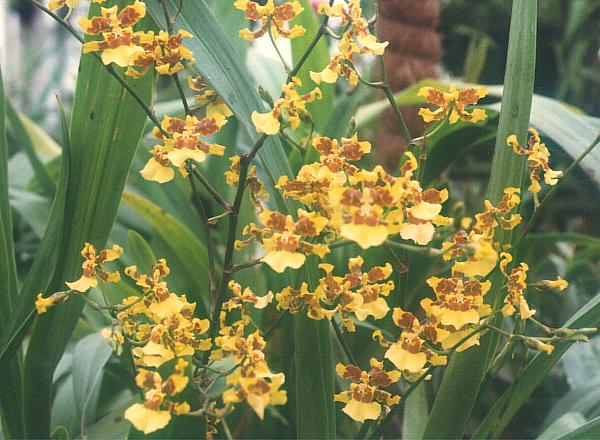
Oncidium sphacelatum

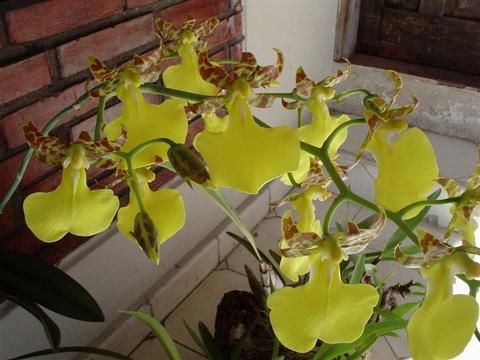
Oncidium splendidum

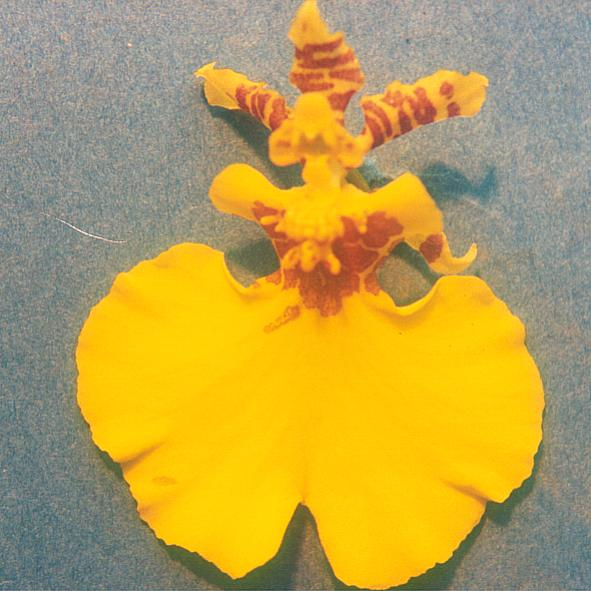
Oncidium varicosum

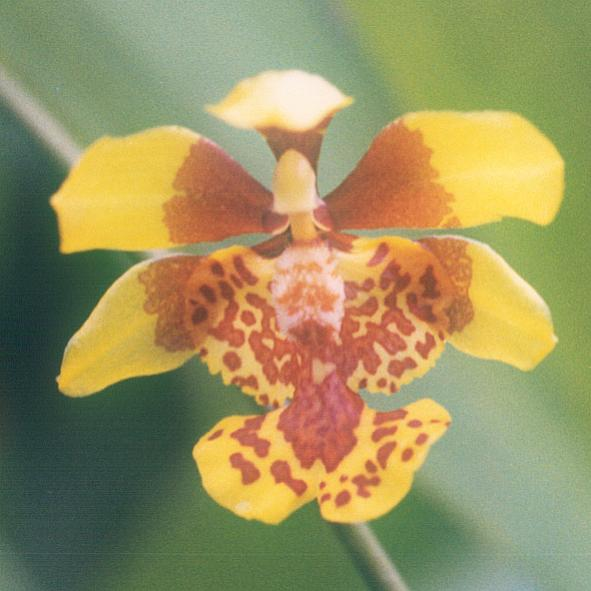
Trichocentrum divaricatum, syn. Oncidium divaricatum

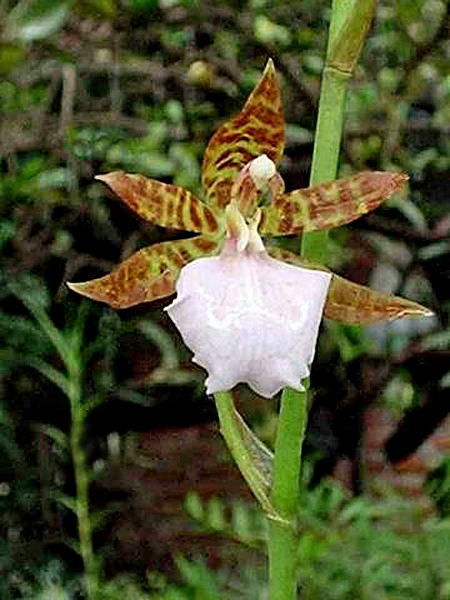
Odontoglossum bictoniense (Rhynchostele bictoniensis)

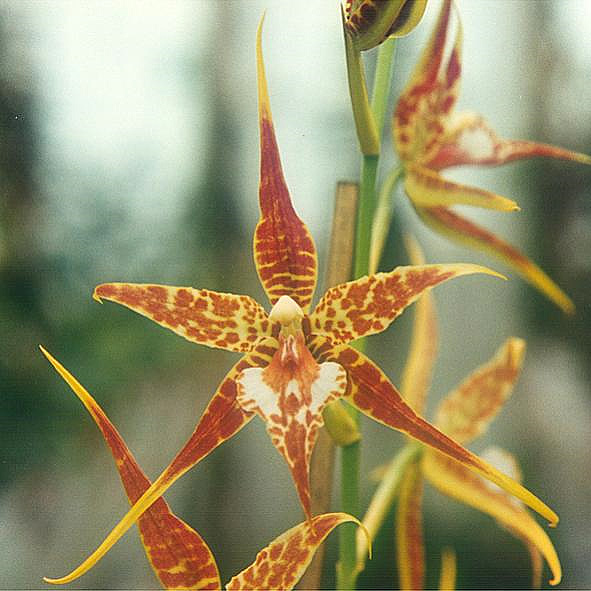
Odontoglossum cordatum (Rhynchostele cordata)

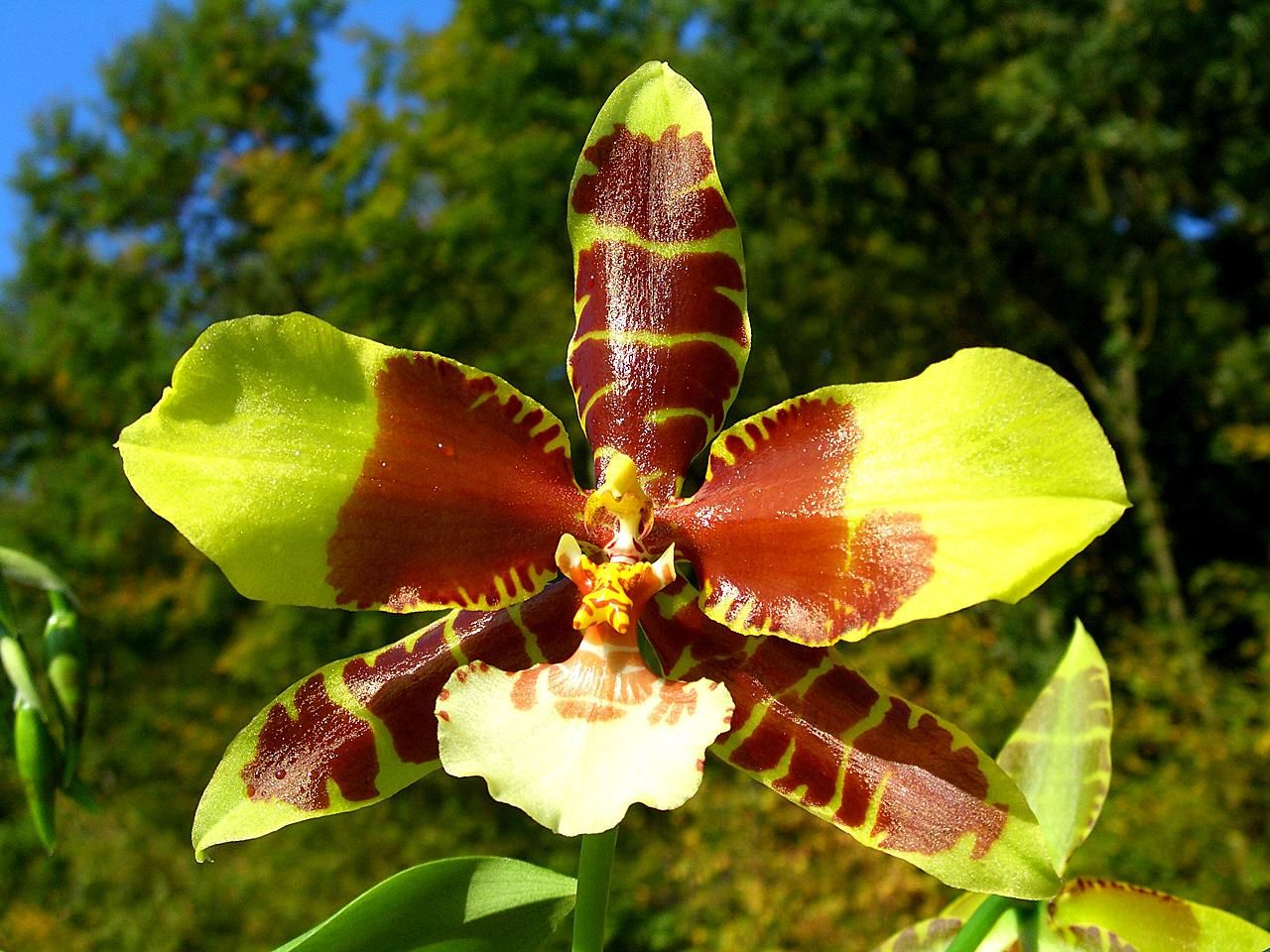
Odontoglossum grande (Rossioglossum grande)

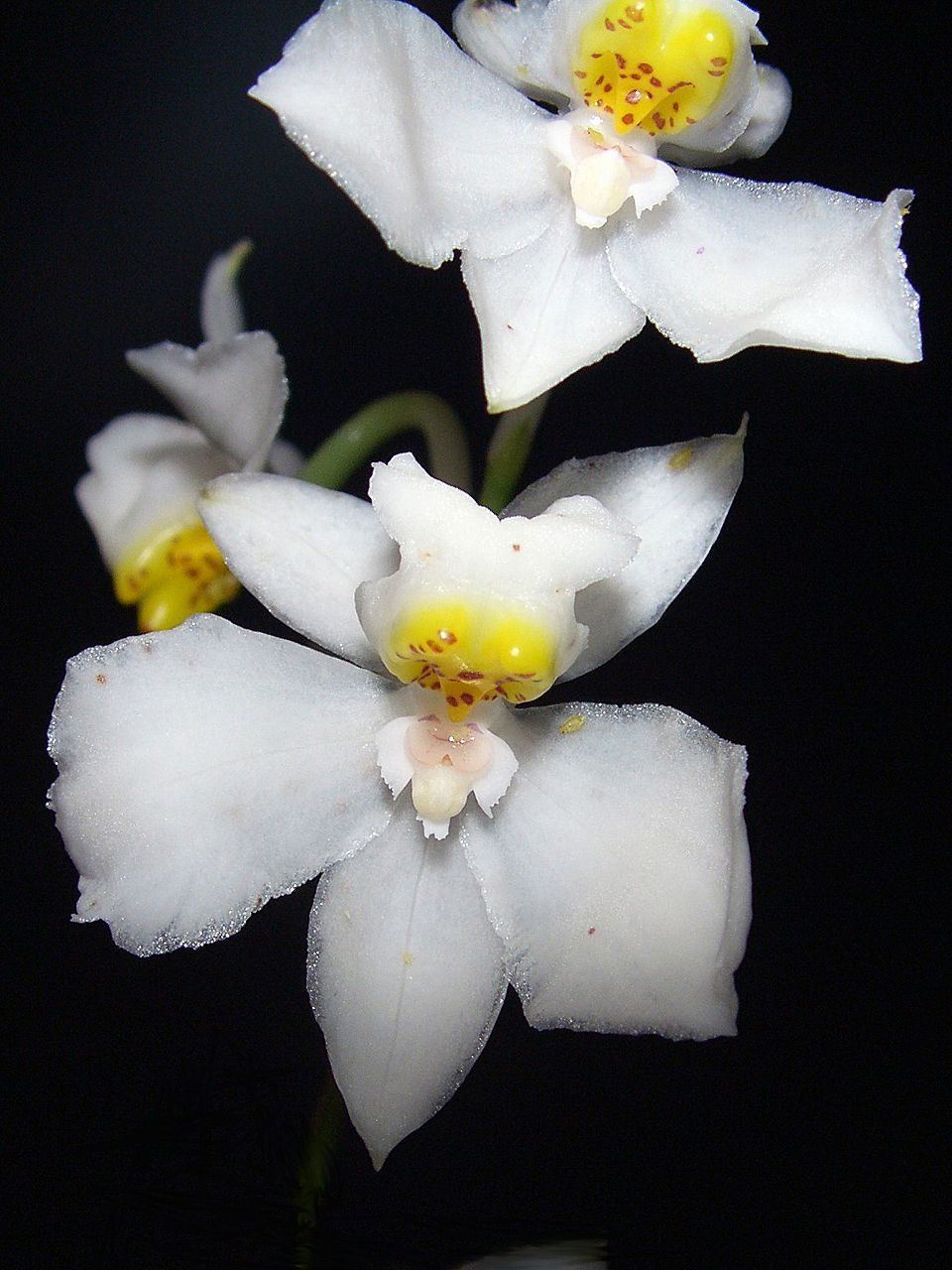
Odontoglossum pulchellum (Cuitlauzina pulchella)

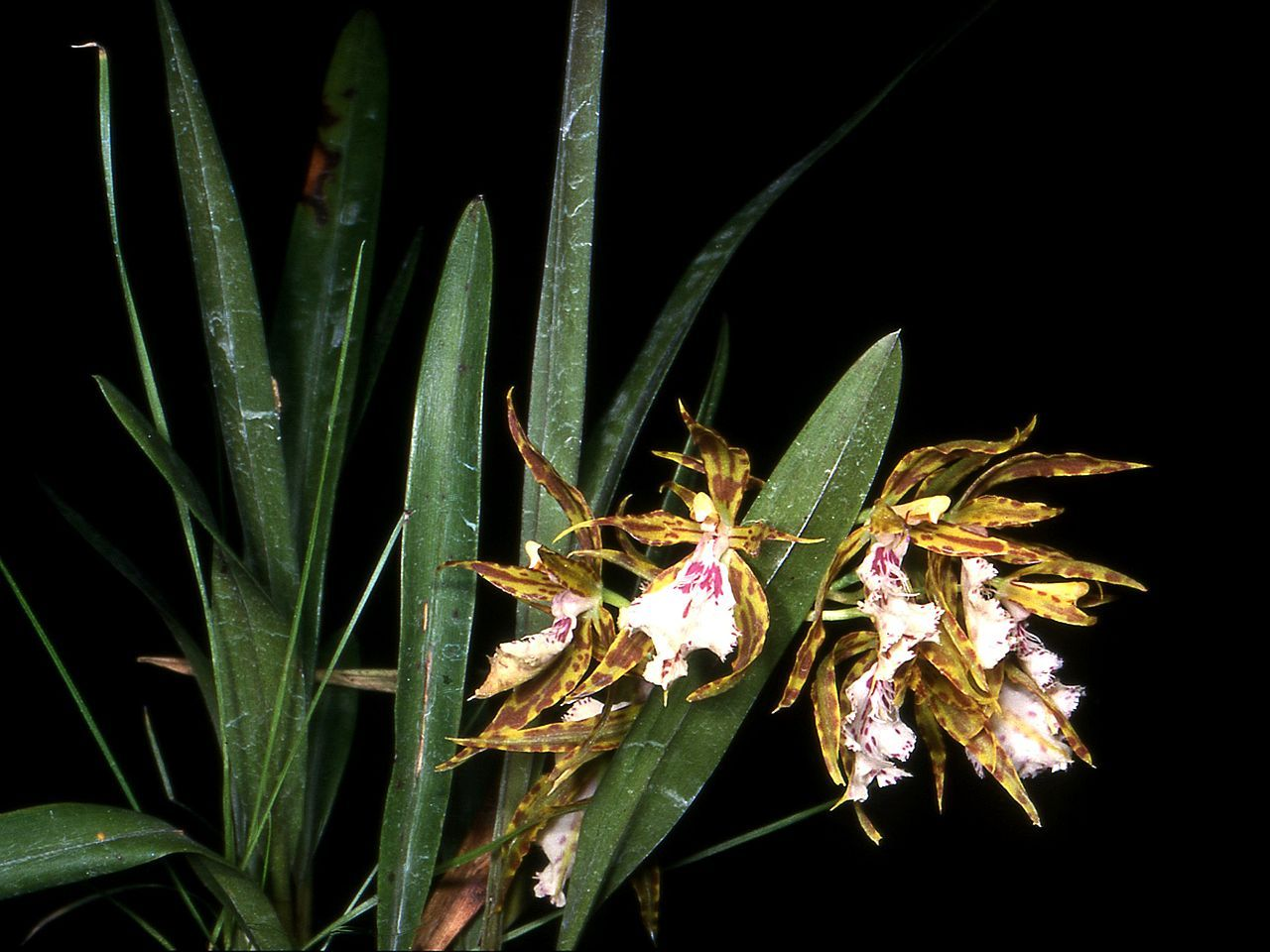
Odontoglossum tenue

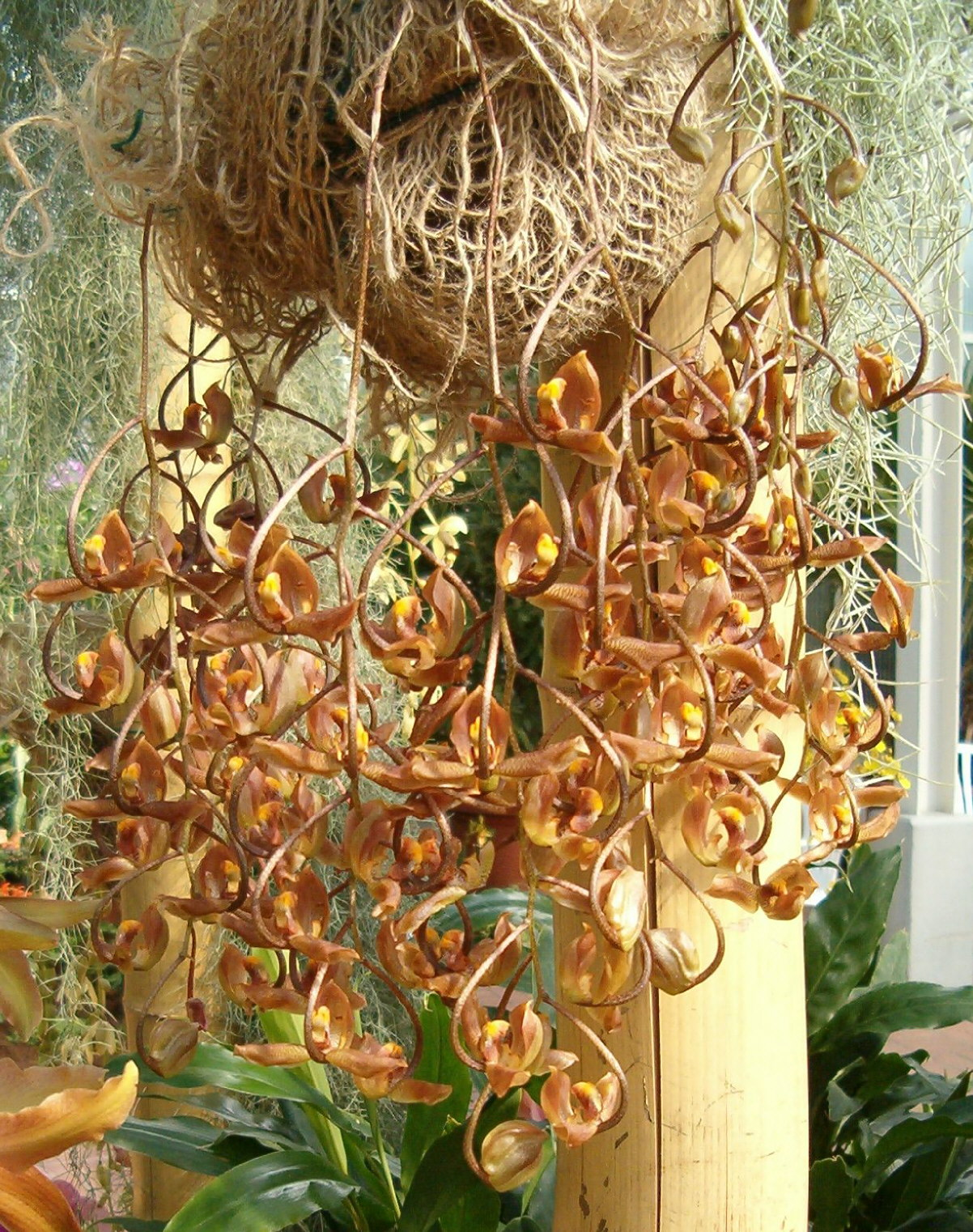
Gongora galeata

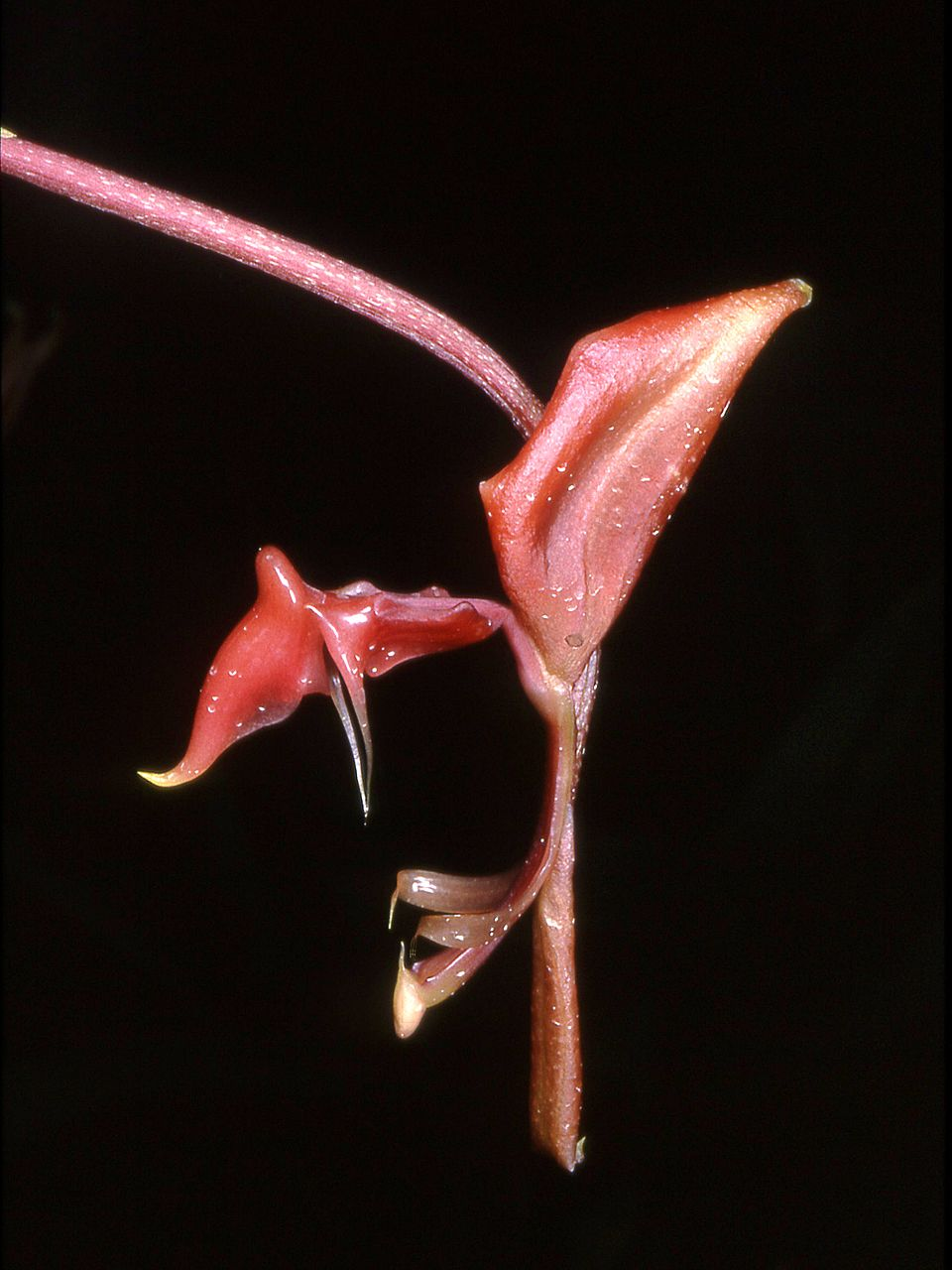
Gongora ilense

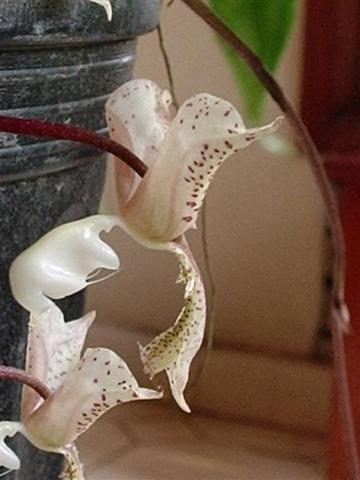
Gongora truncata

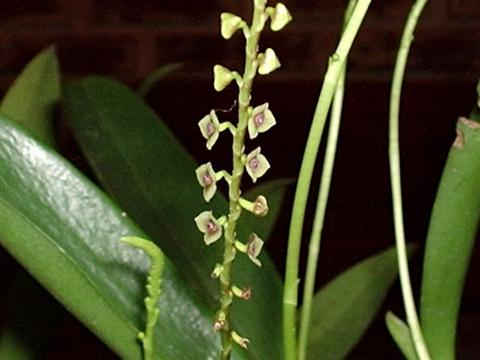
Stelis argentata

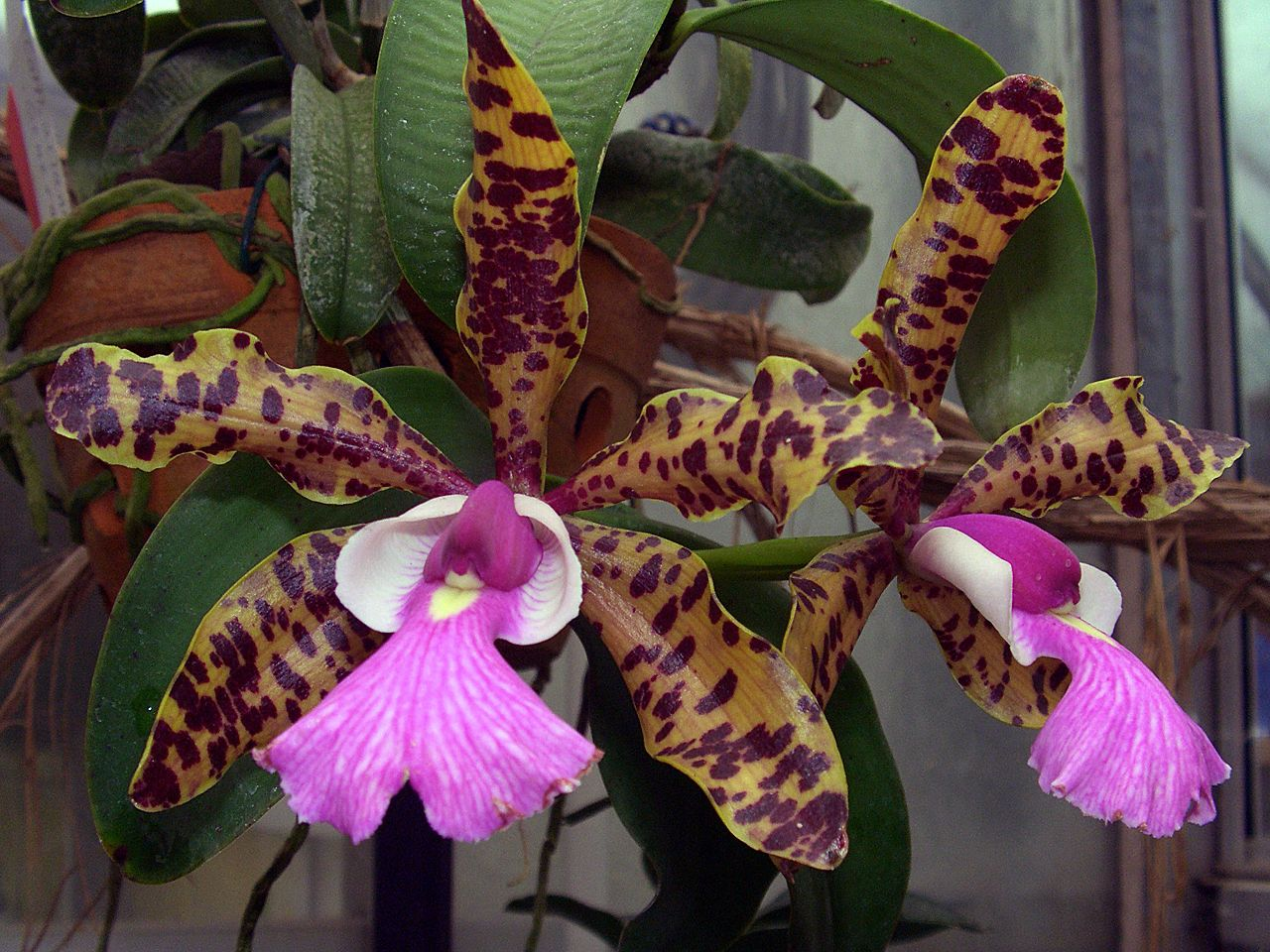
Cattleya aclandiae

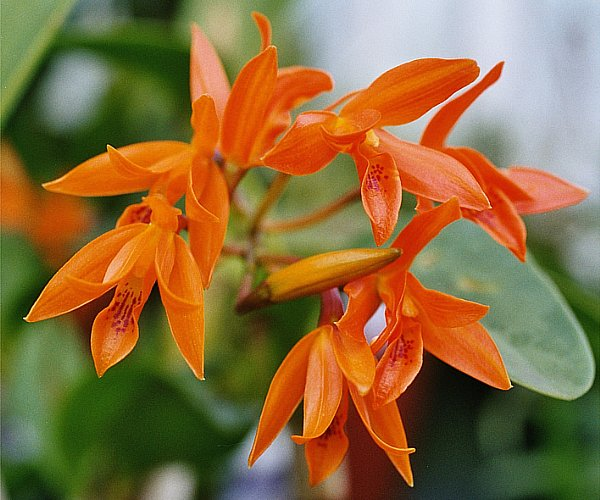
Guarianthe aurantiaca

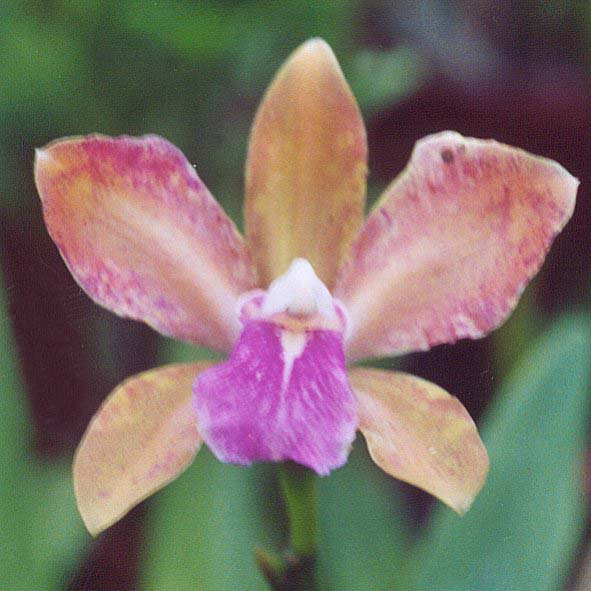
Cattleya bicolor

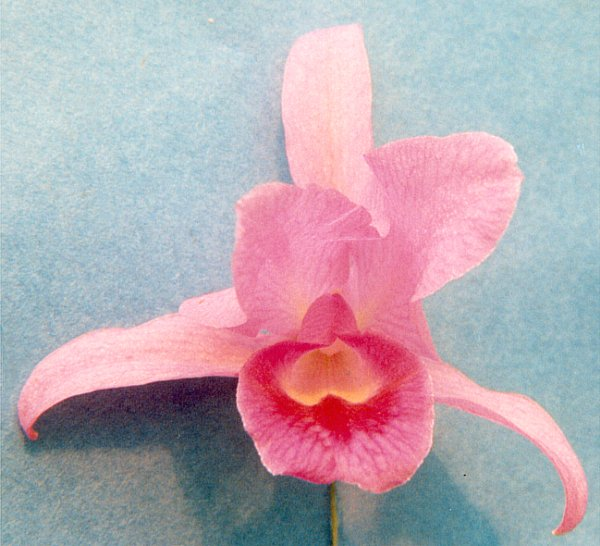
Guarianthe bowringiana

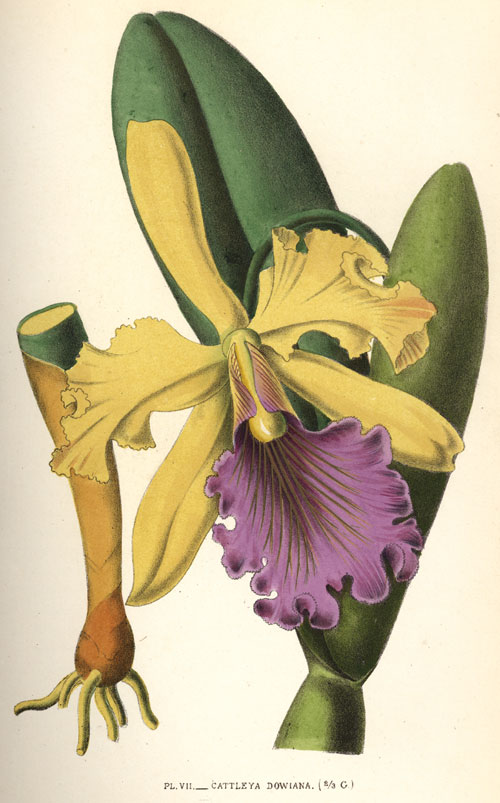
Cattleya dowiana

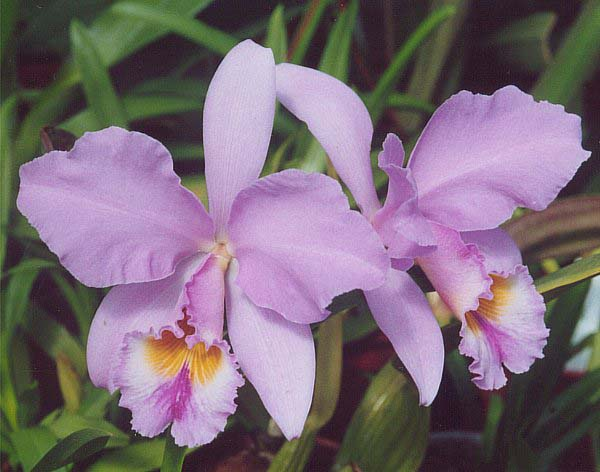
Cattleya gaskelliana

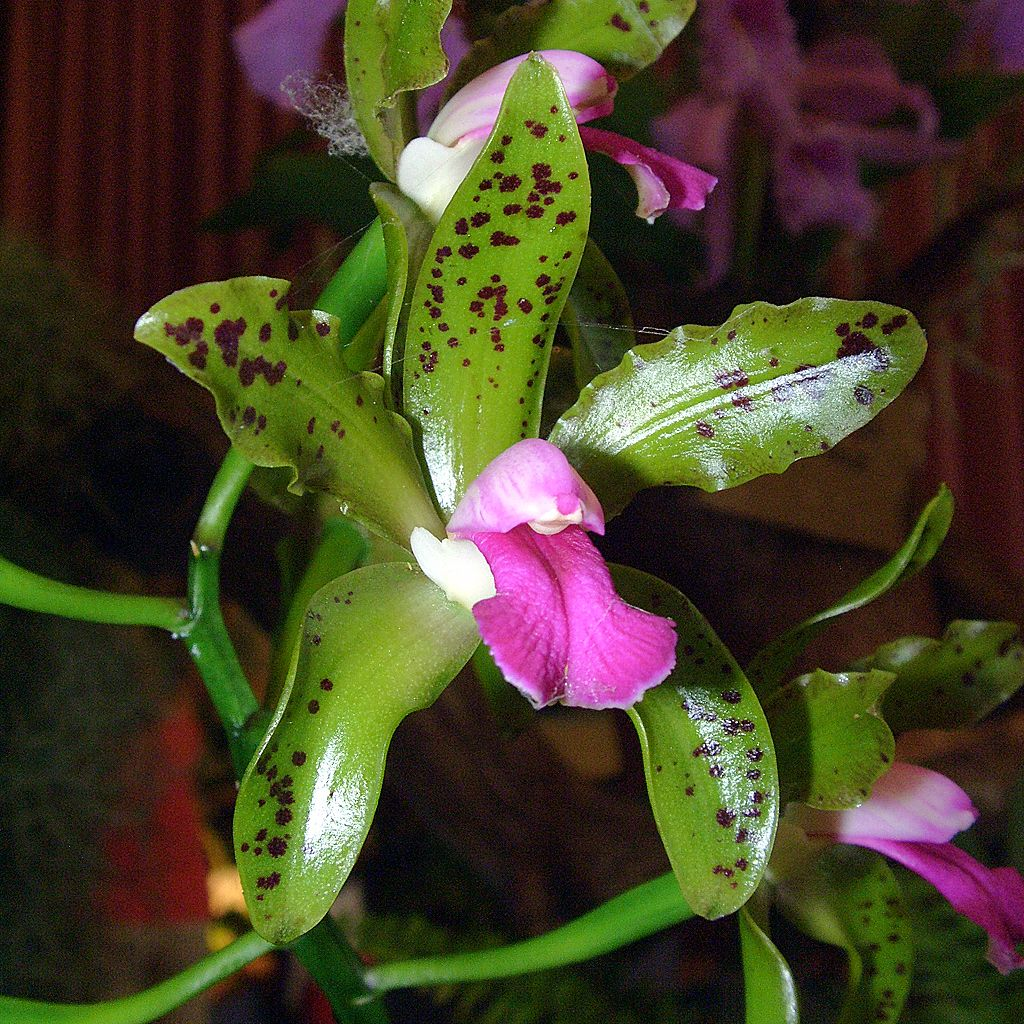
Cattleya guttata

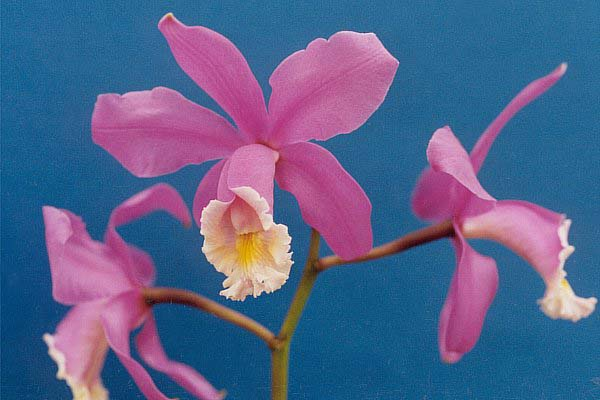
Cattleya harrisoniana

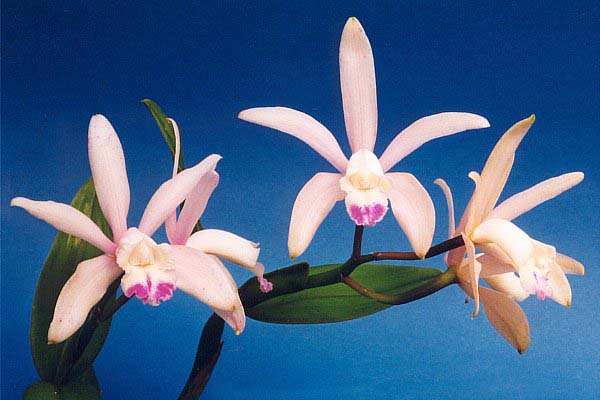
Cattleya intermedia

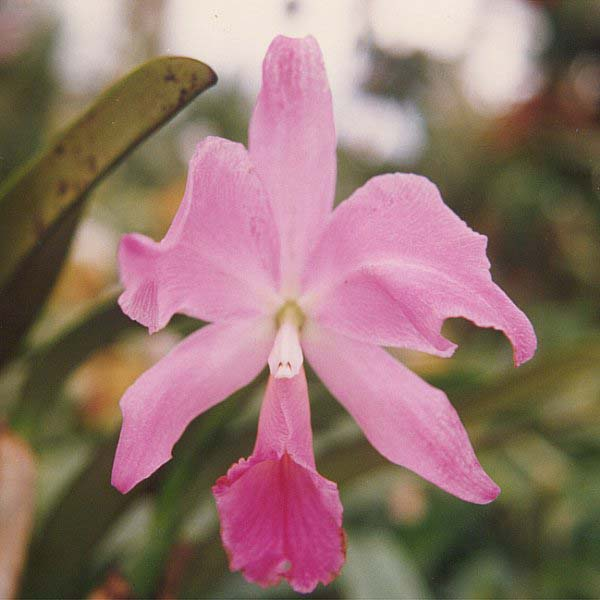
Cattleya labiata

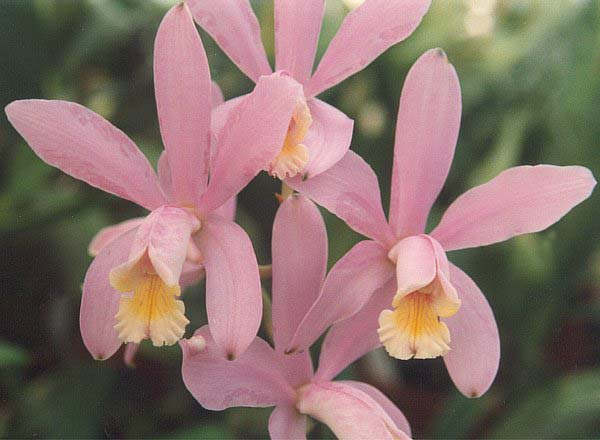
Cattleya loddigesii

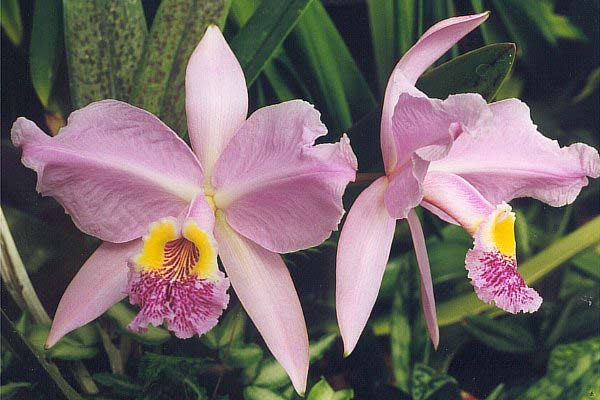
Cattleya lueddemanniana

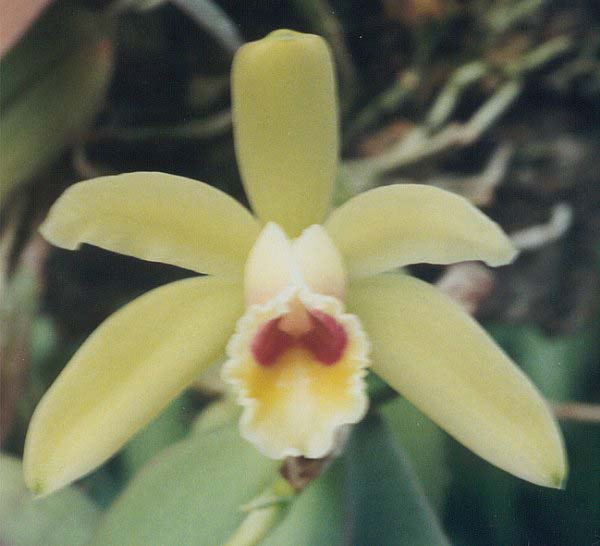
Cattleya luteola

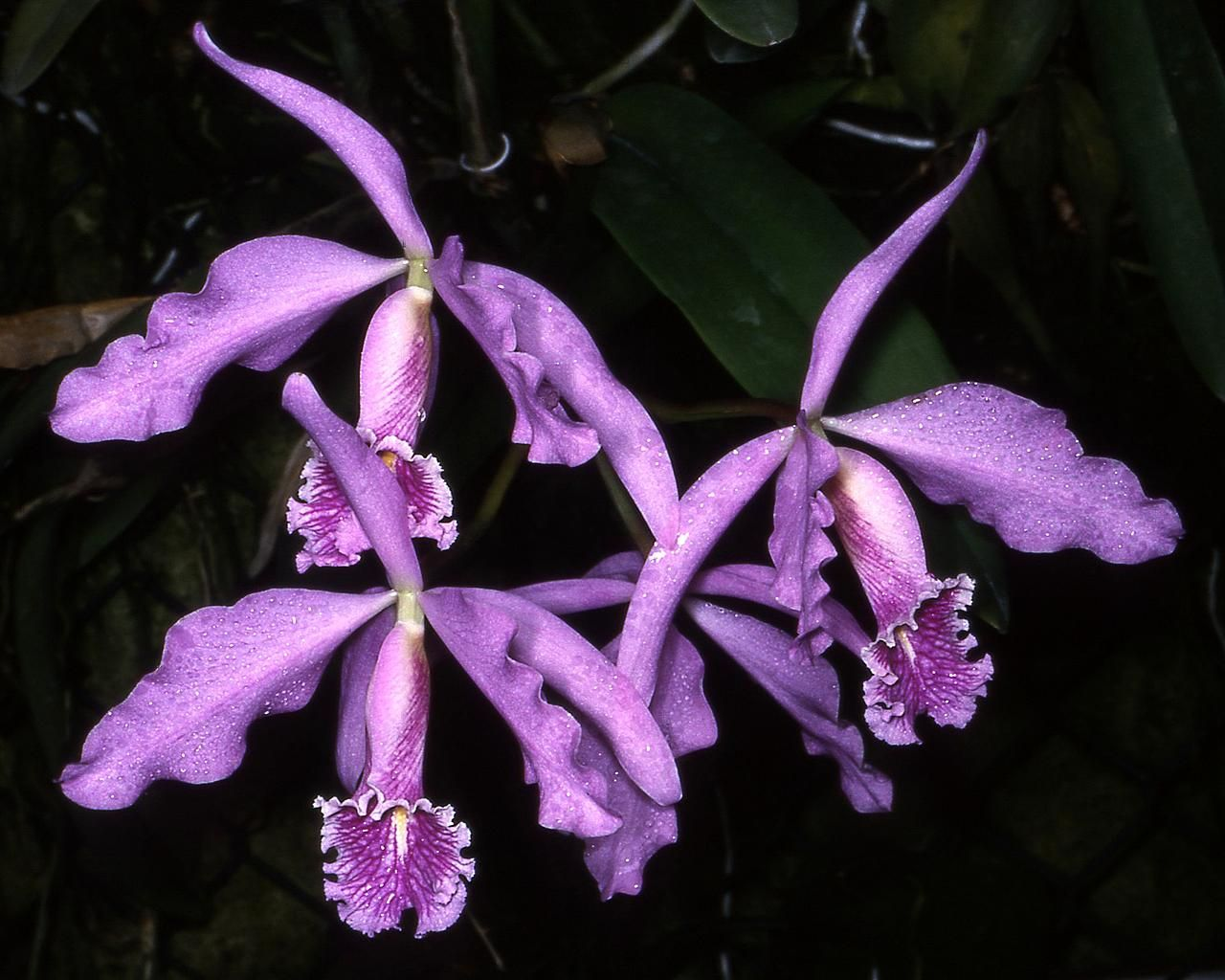
Cattleya maxima

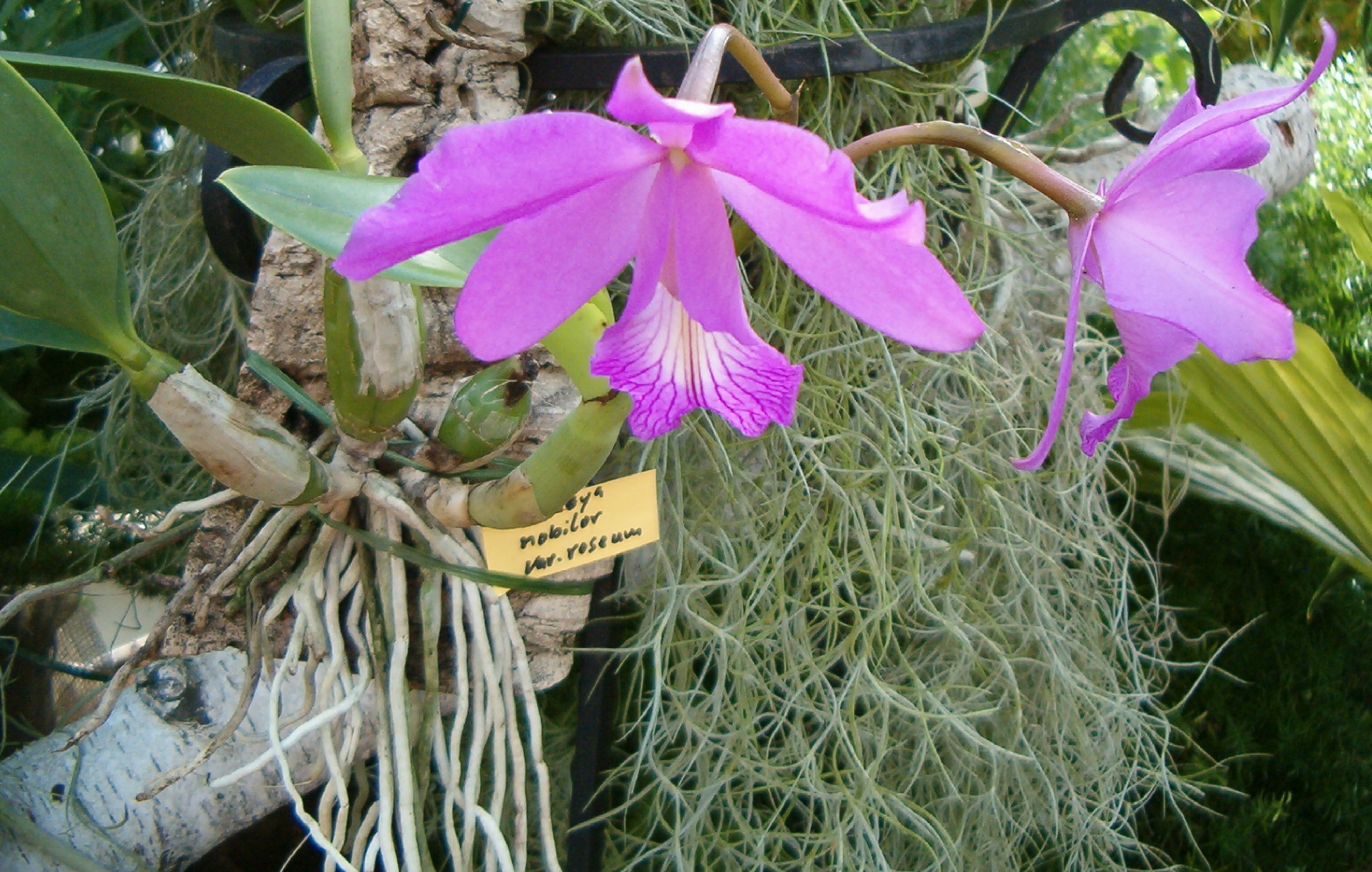
Cattleya nobilior

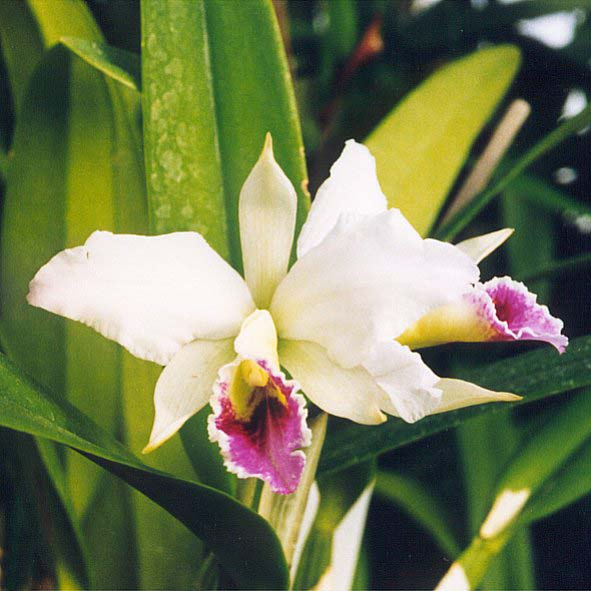
Cattleya percivaliana

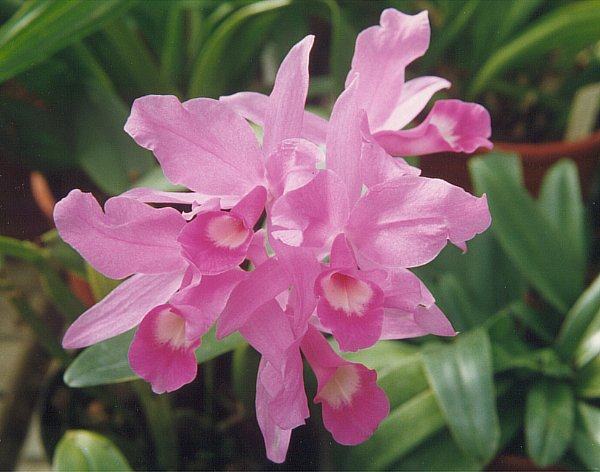
Cattleya skinneri

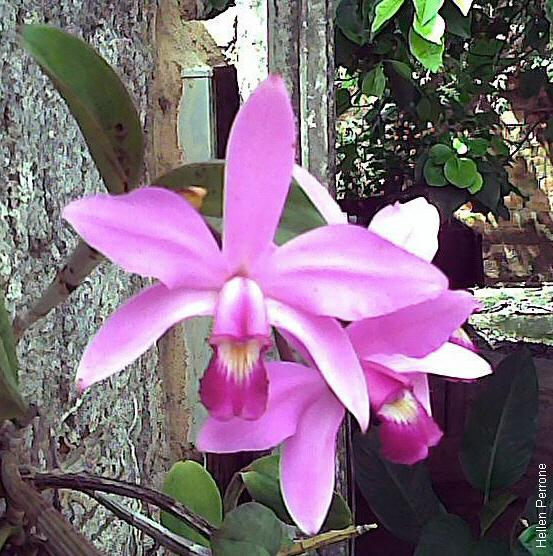
Cattleya violacea

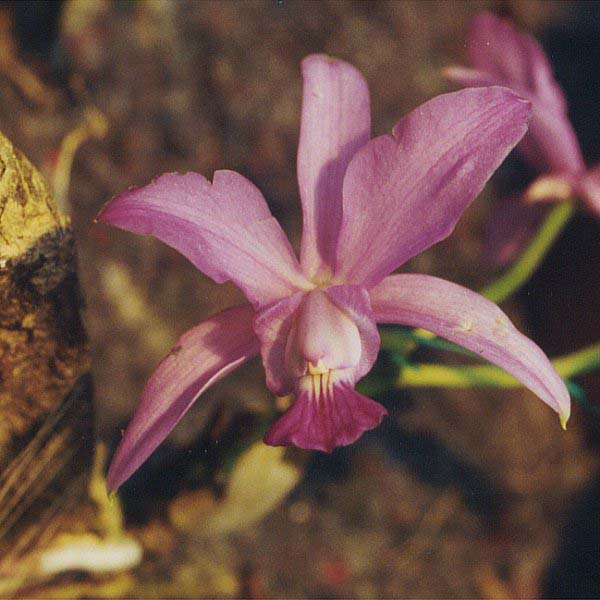
Cattleya walkeriana

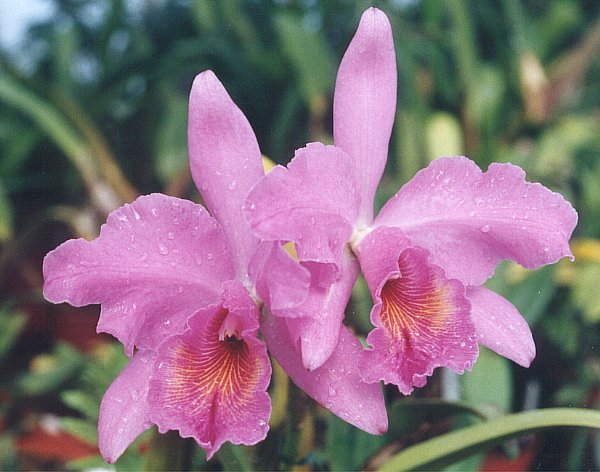
Cattleya warscewiczii

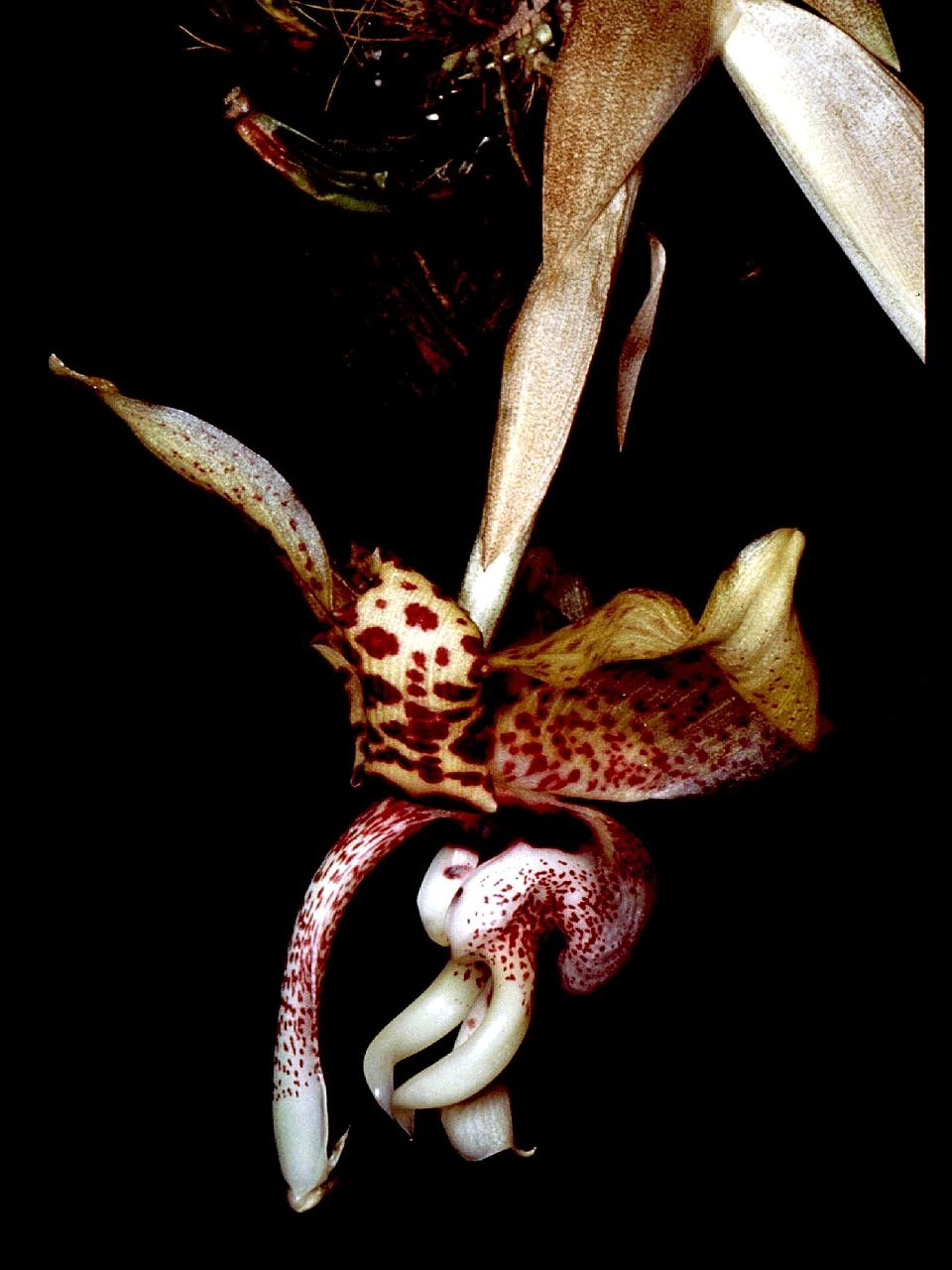
Anguloa brevilabris

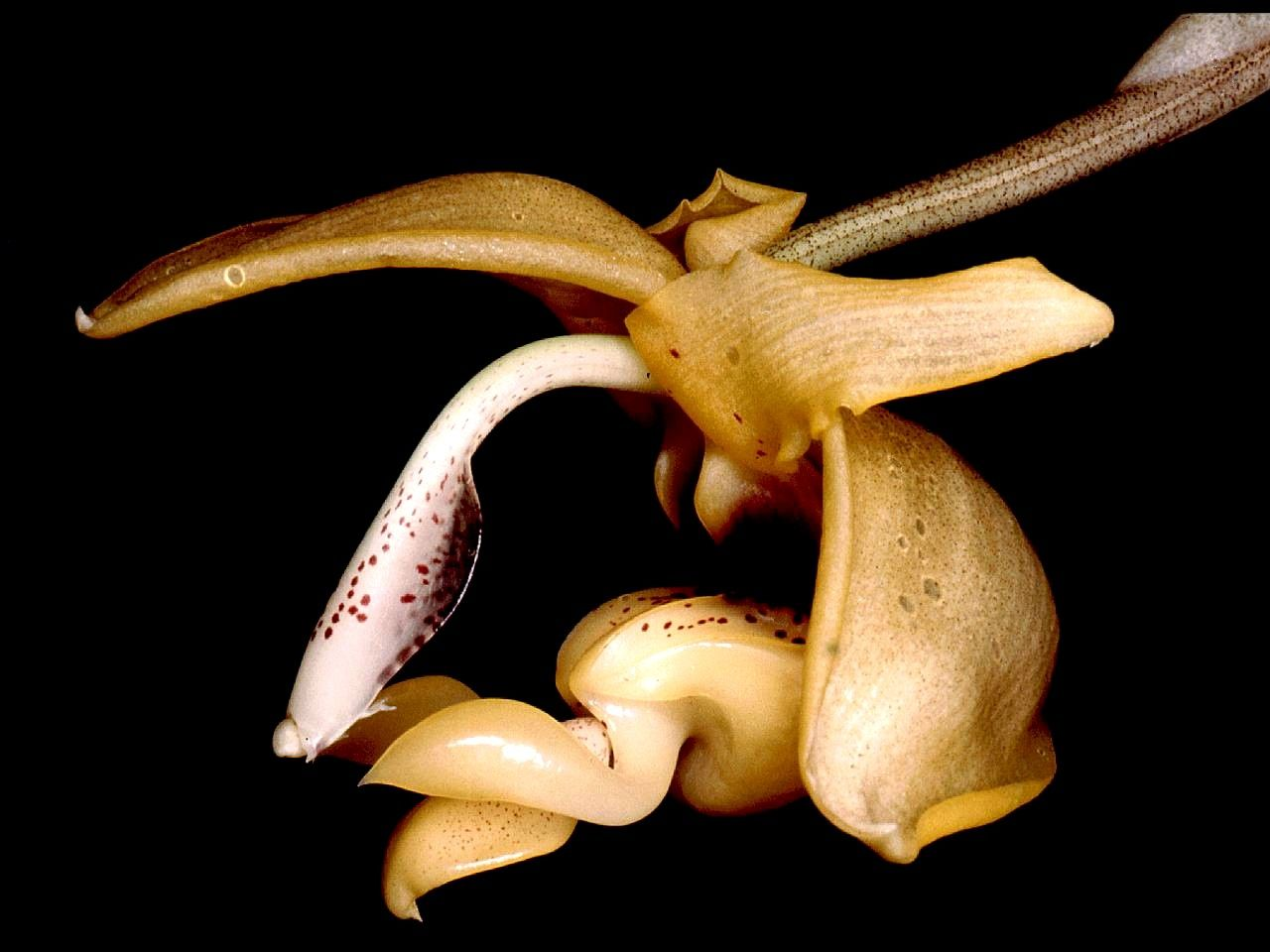
Stanhopea anfracta

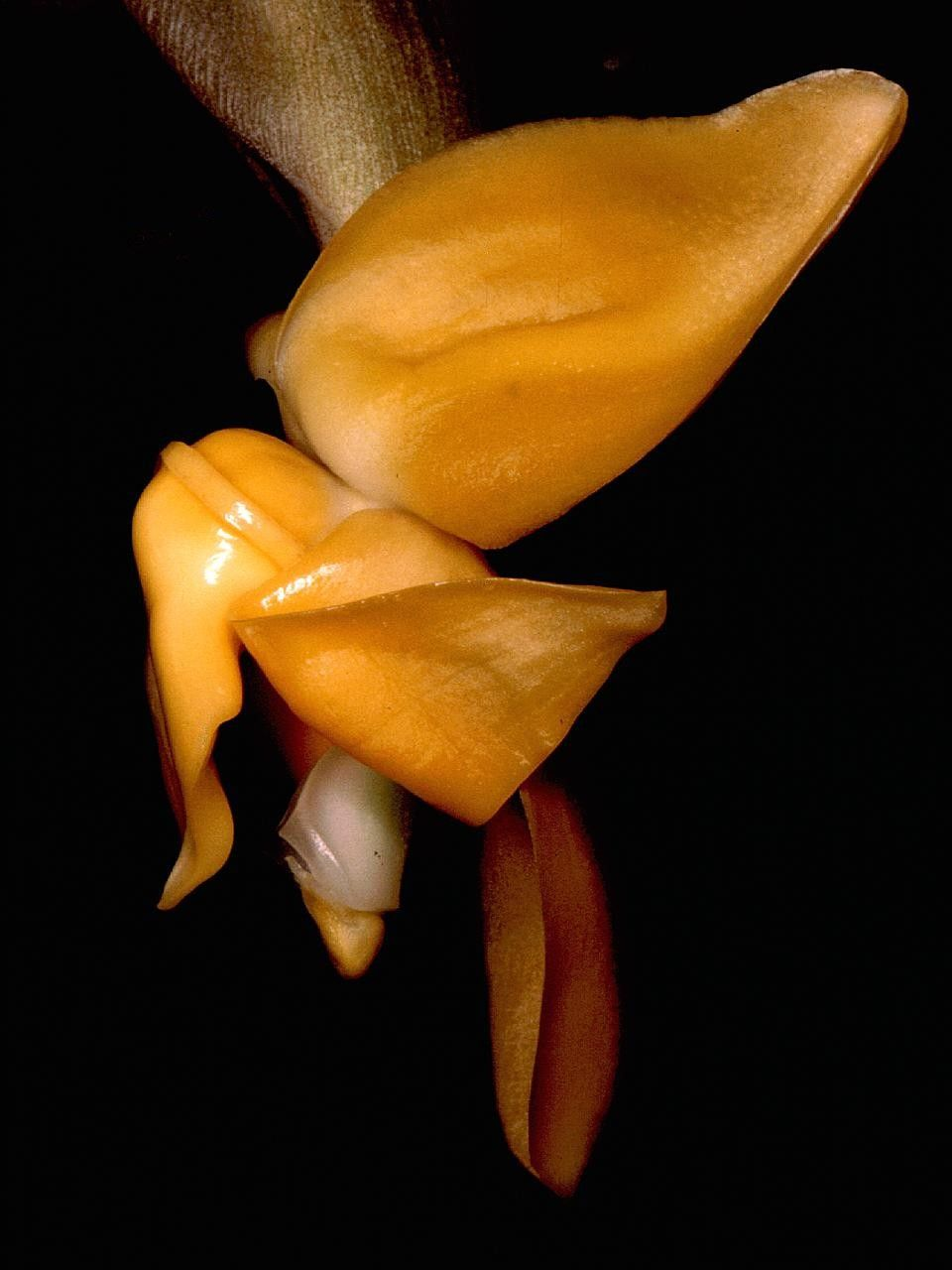
Stanhopea annulata

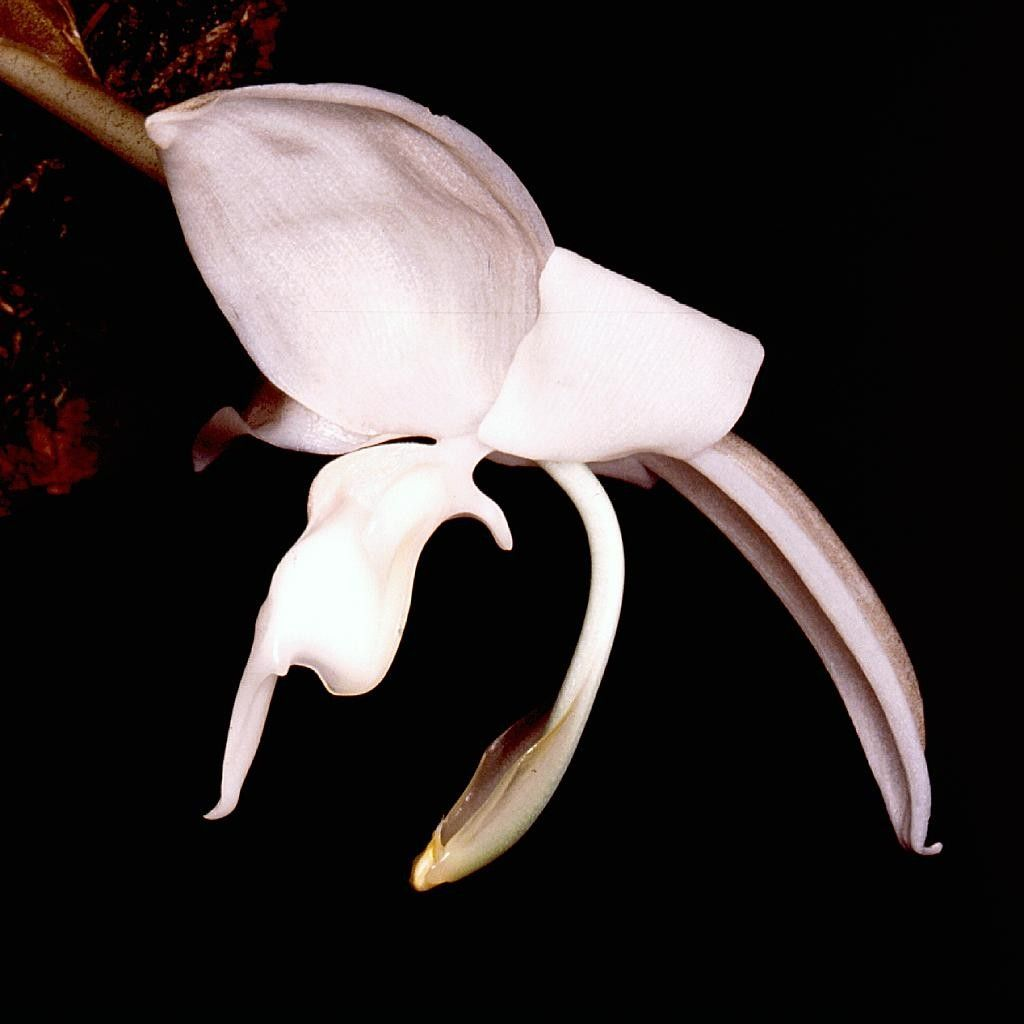
Stanhopea candida

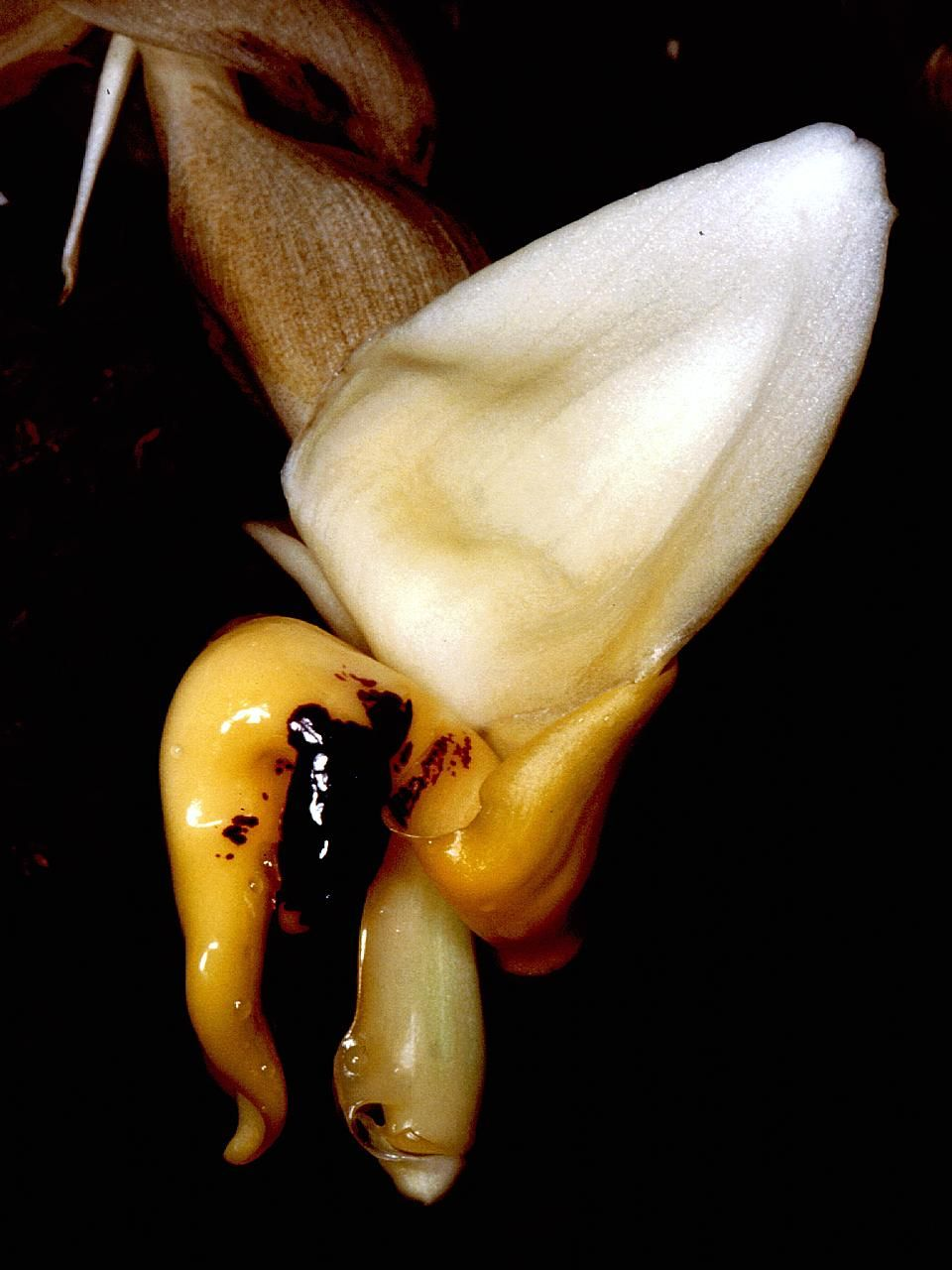
Stanhopea cirrhata

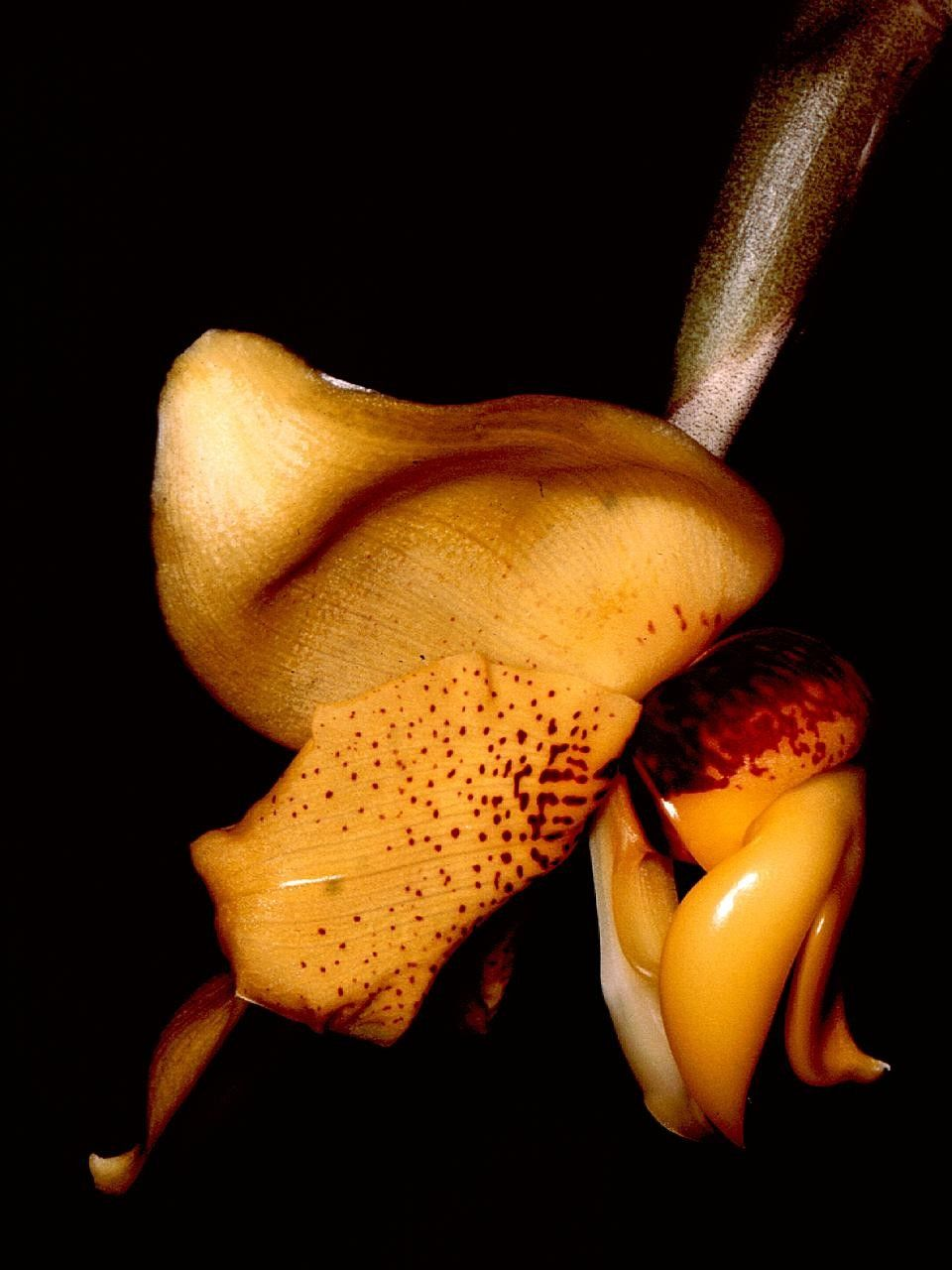
Stanhopea connata

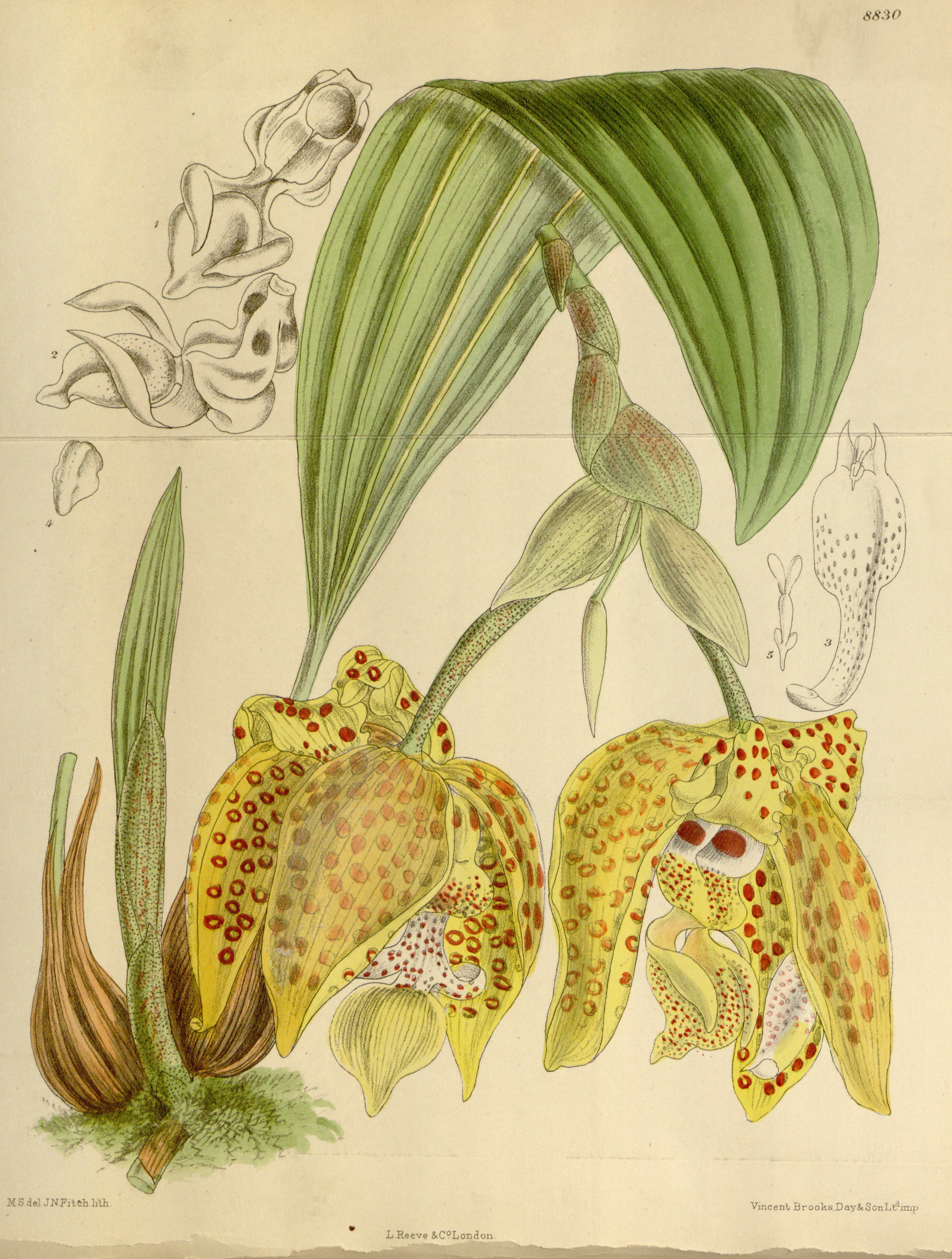
Stanhopea costaricensis

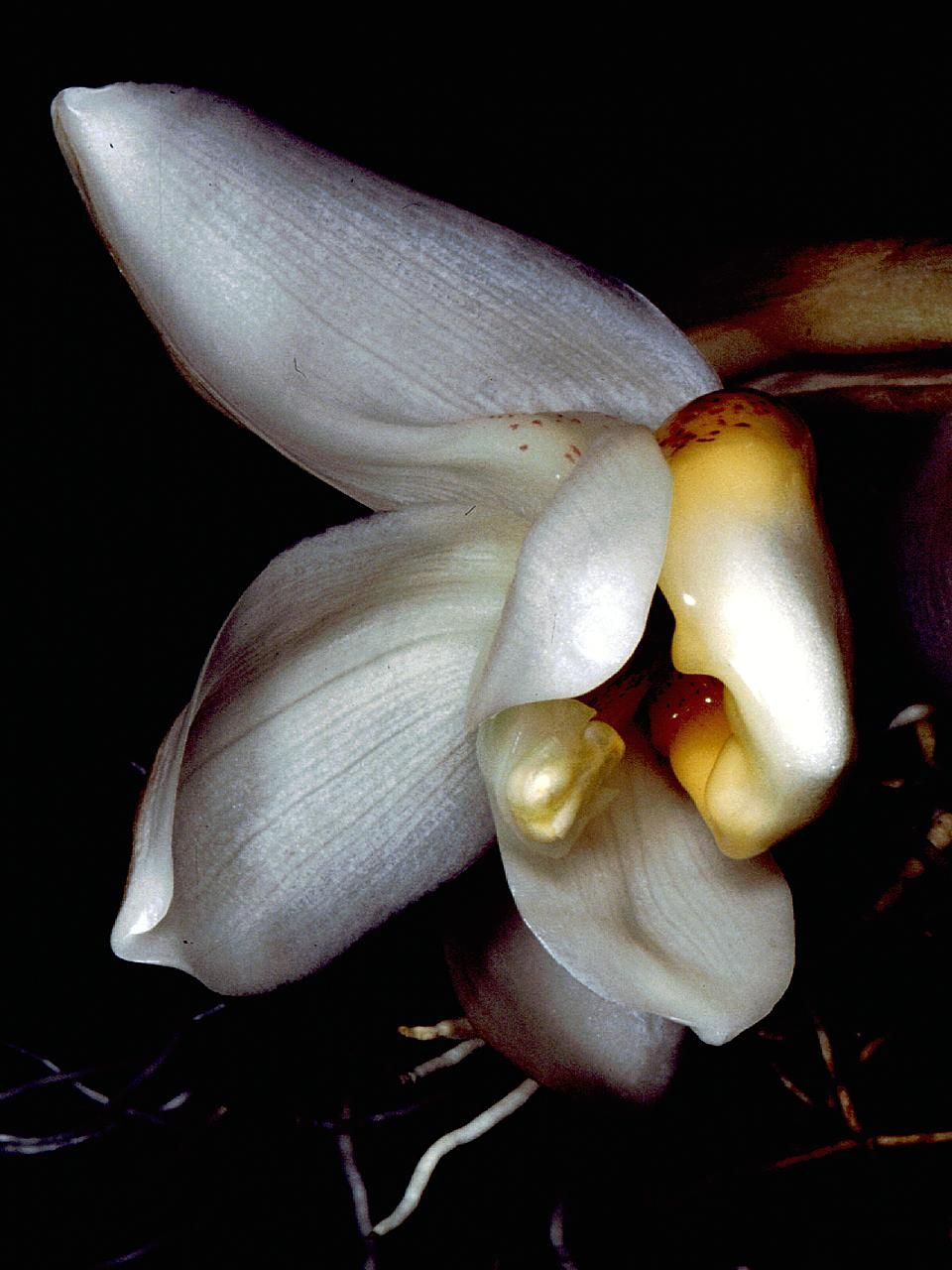
Stanhopea ecornuta

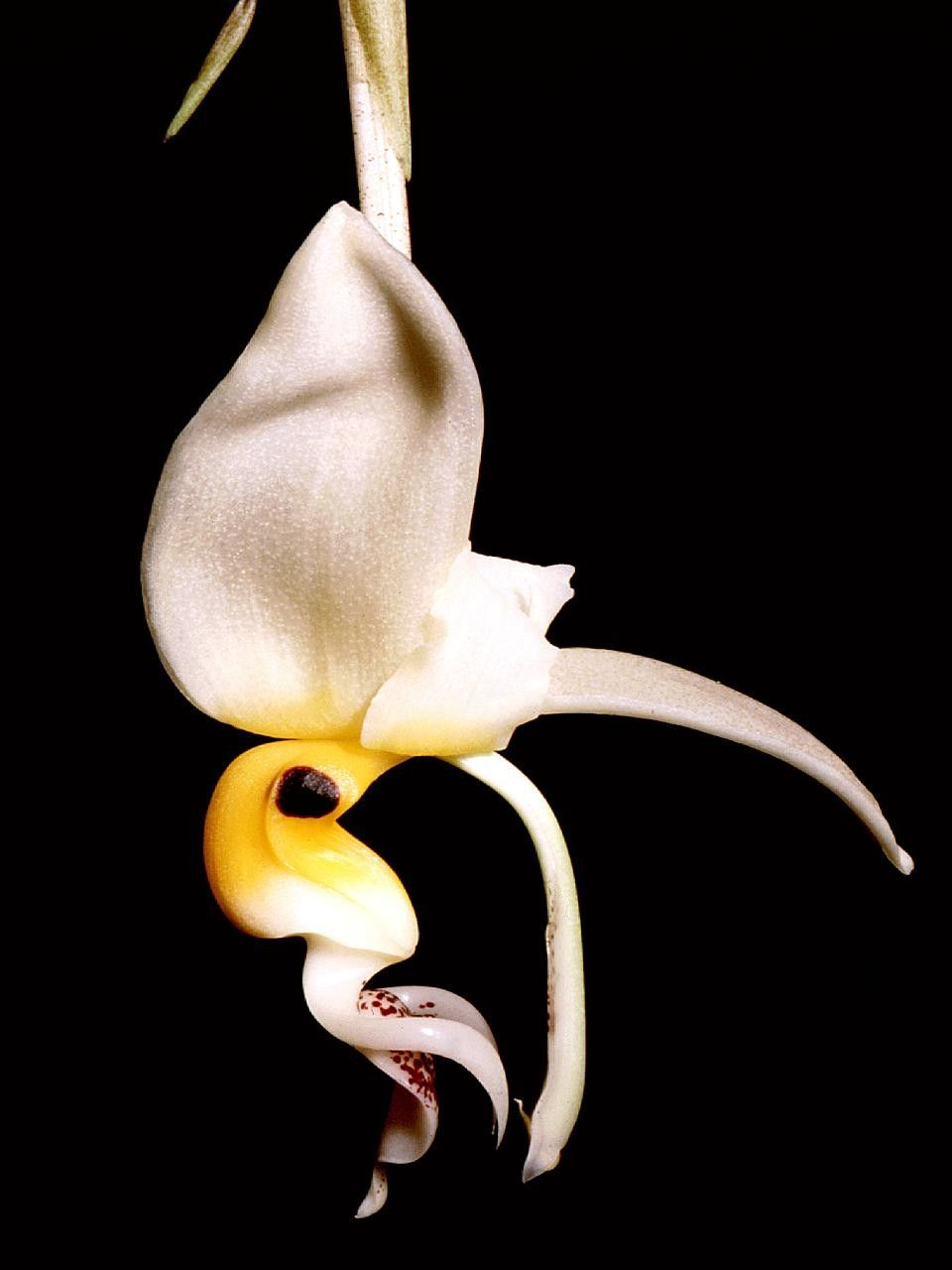
Stanhopea embreei

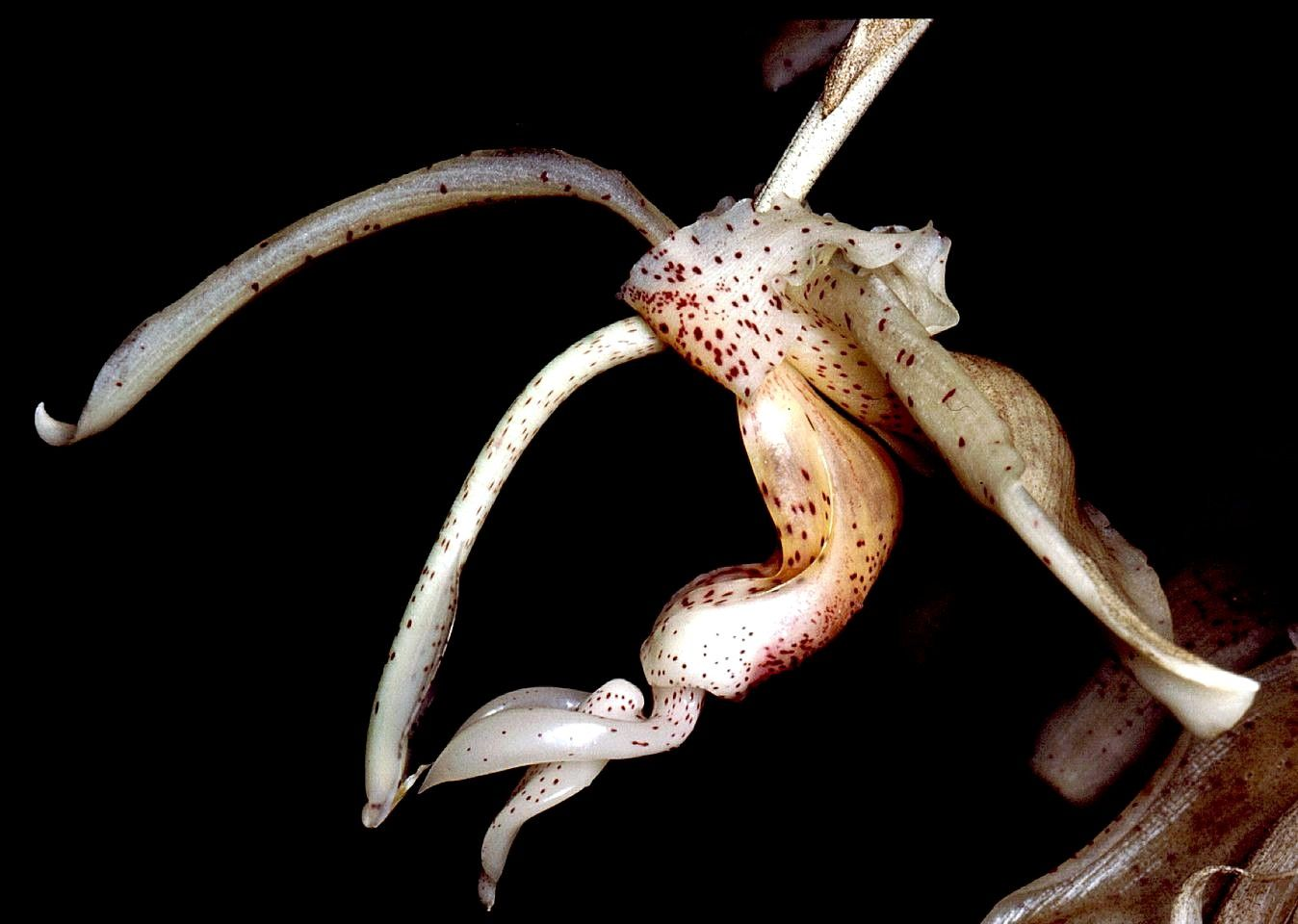
Stanhopea florida

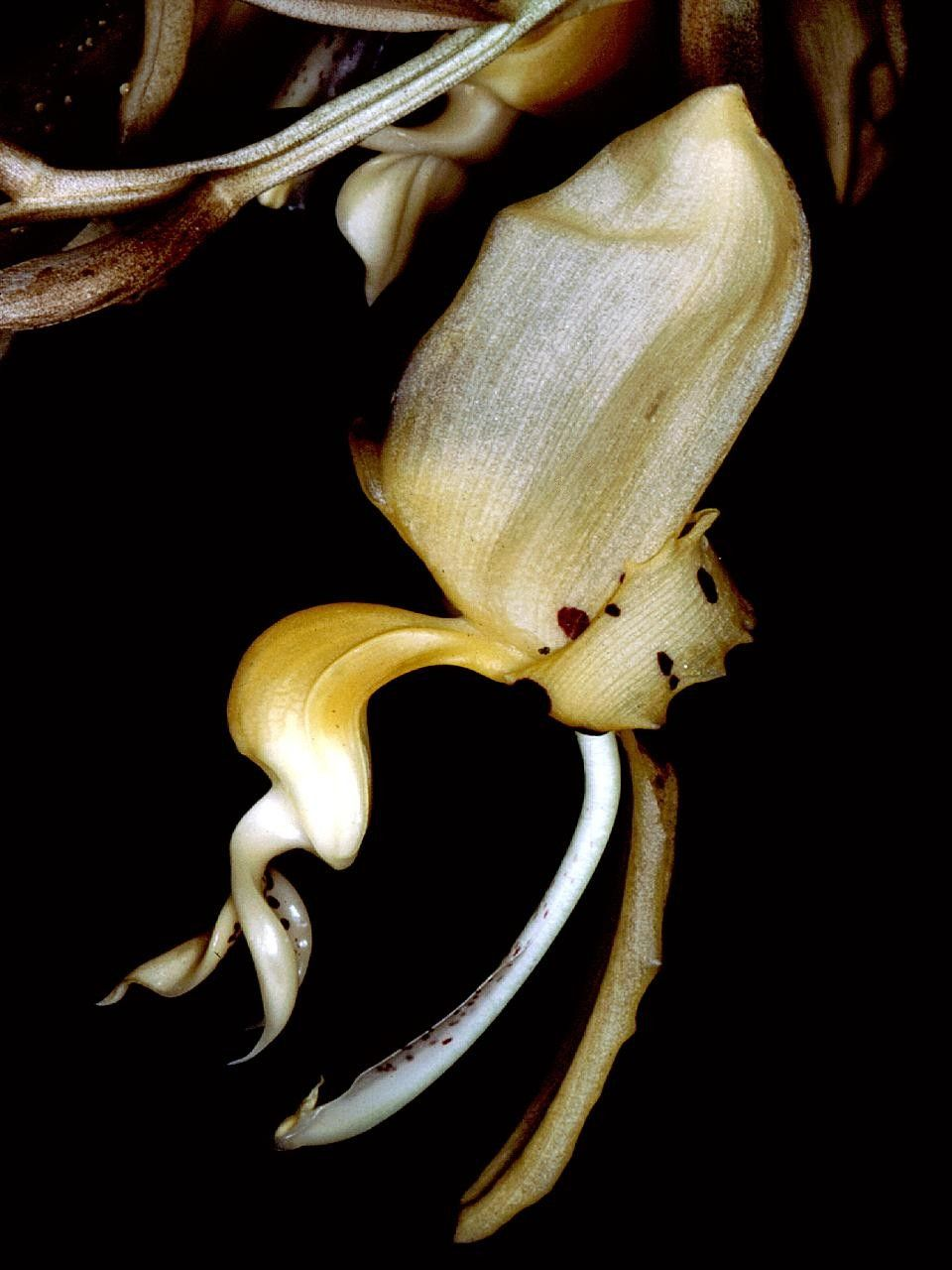
Stanhopea frymirei

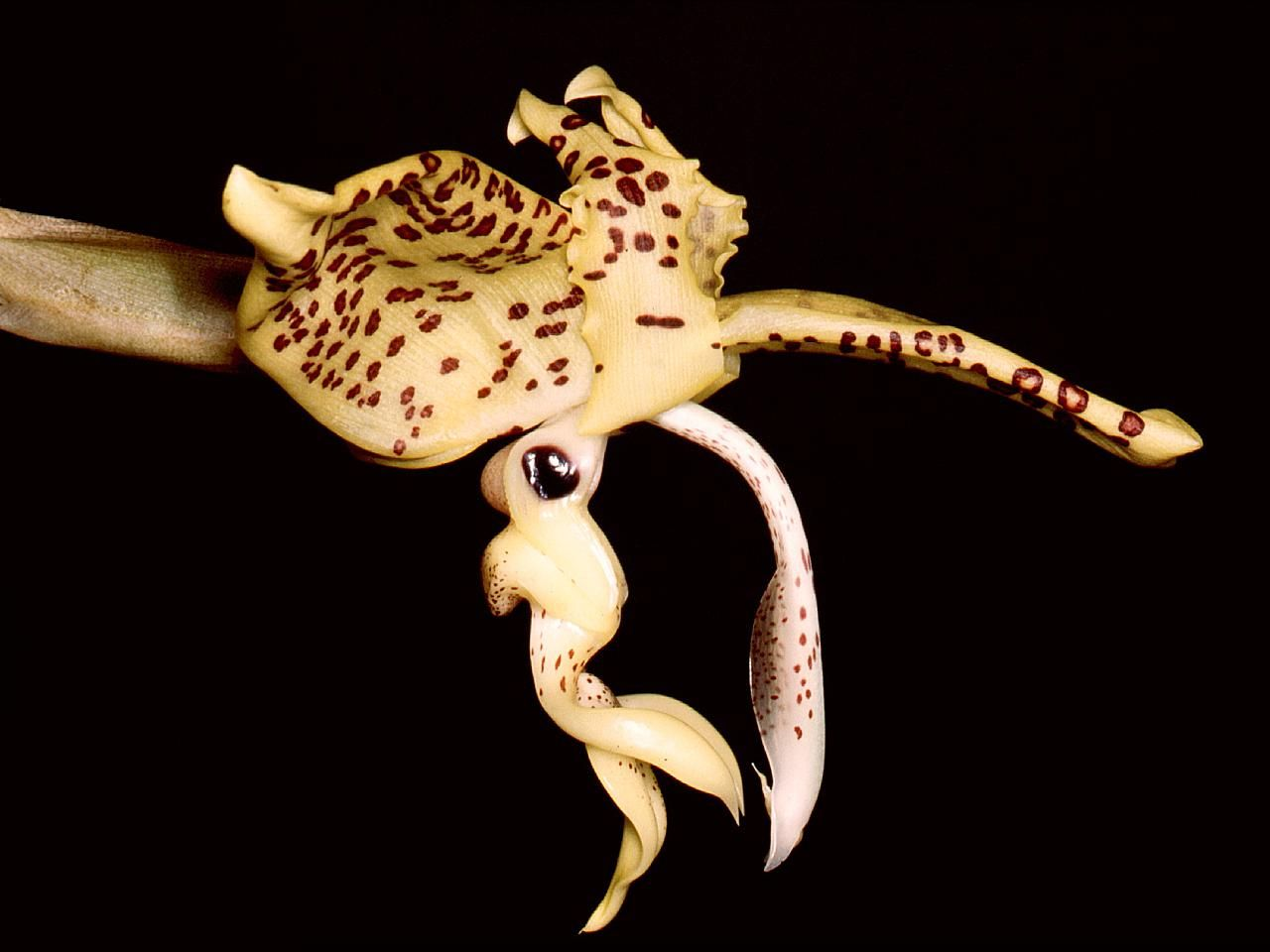
Stanhopea gibbosa

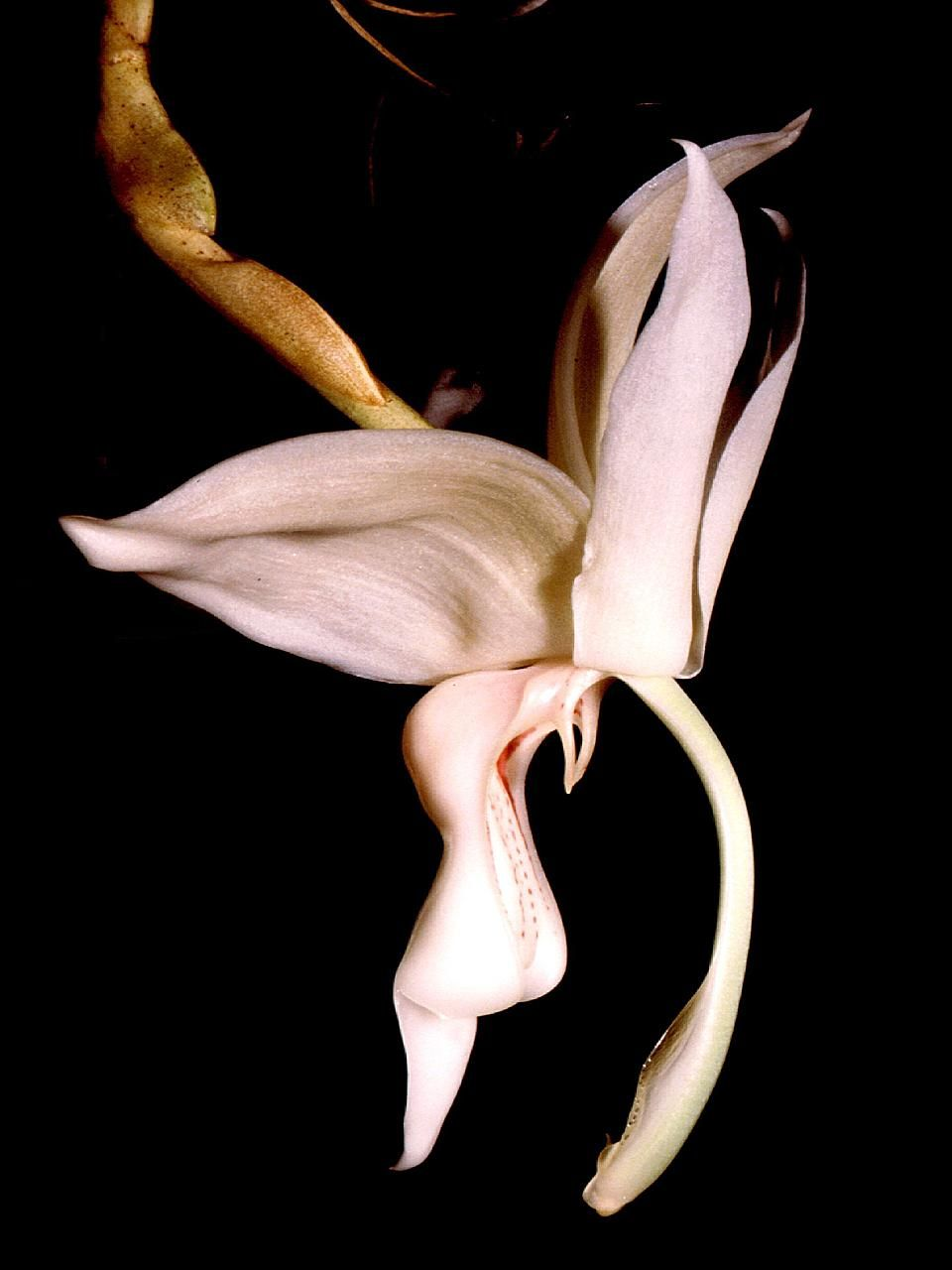
Stanhopea grandiflora

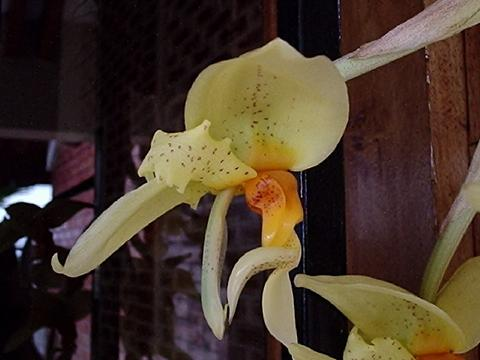
Stanhopea graveolens

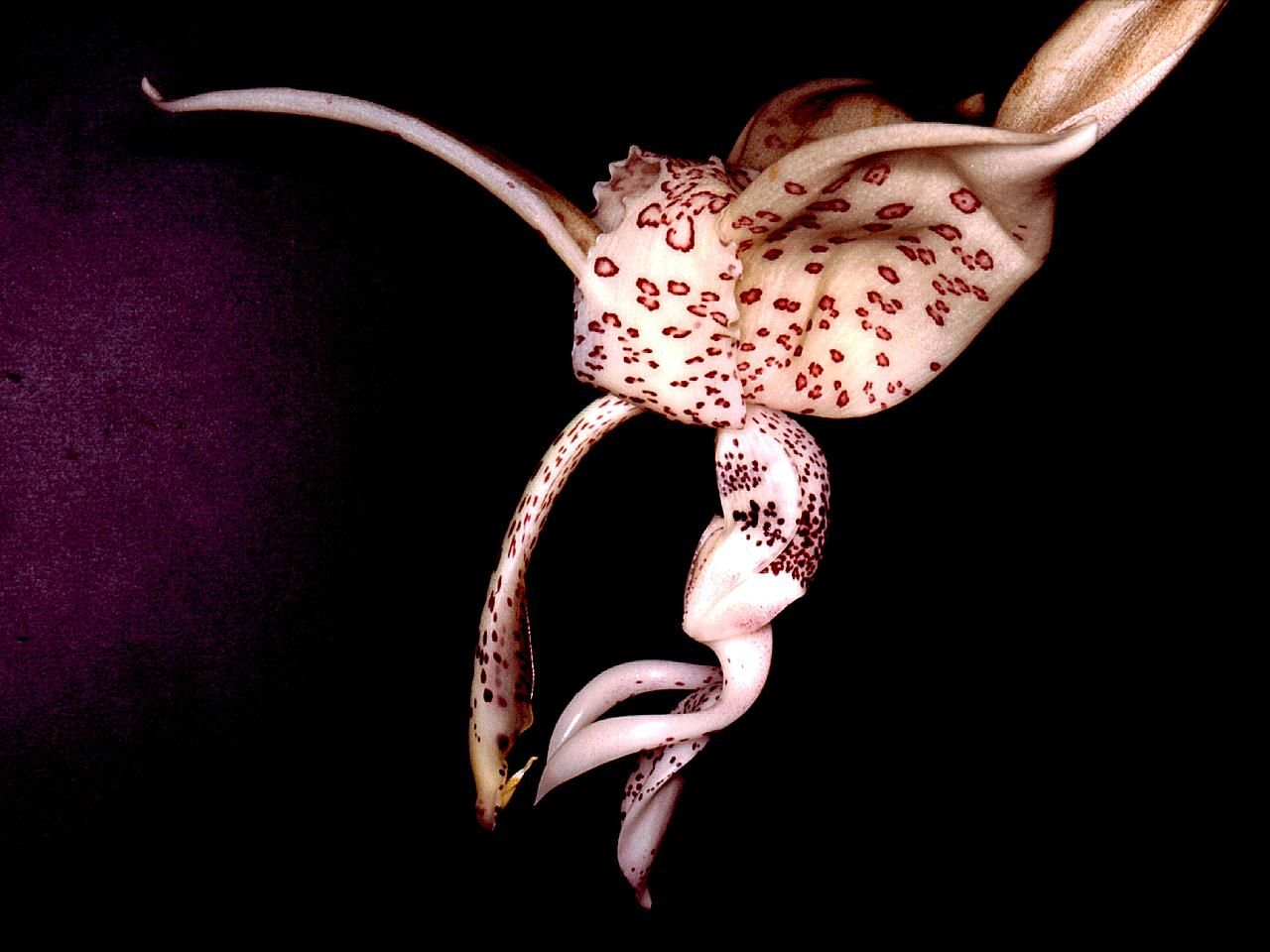
Stanhopea haseloffiana

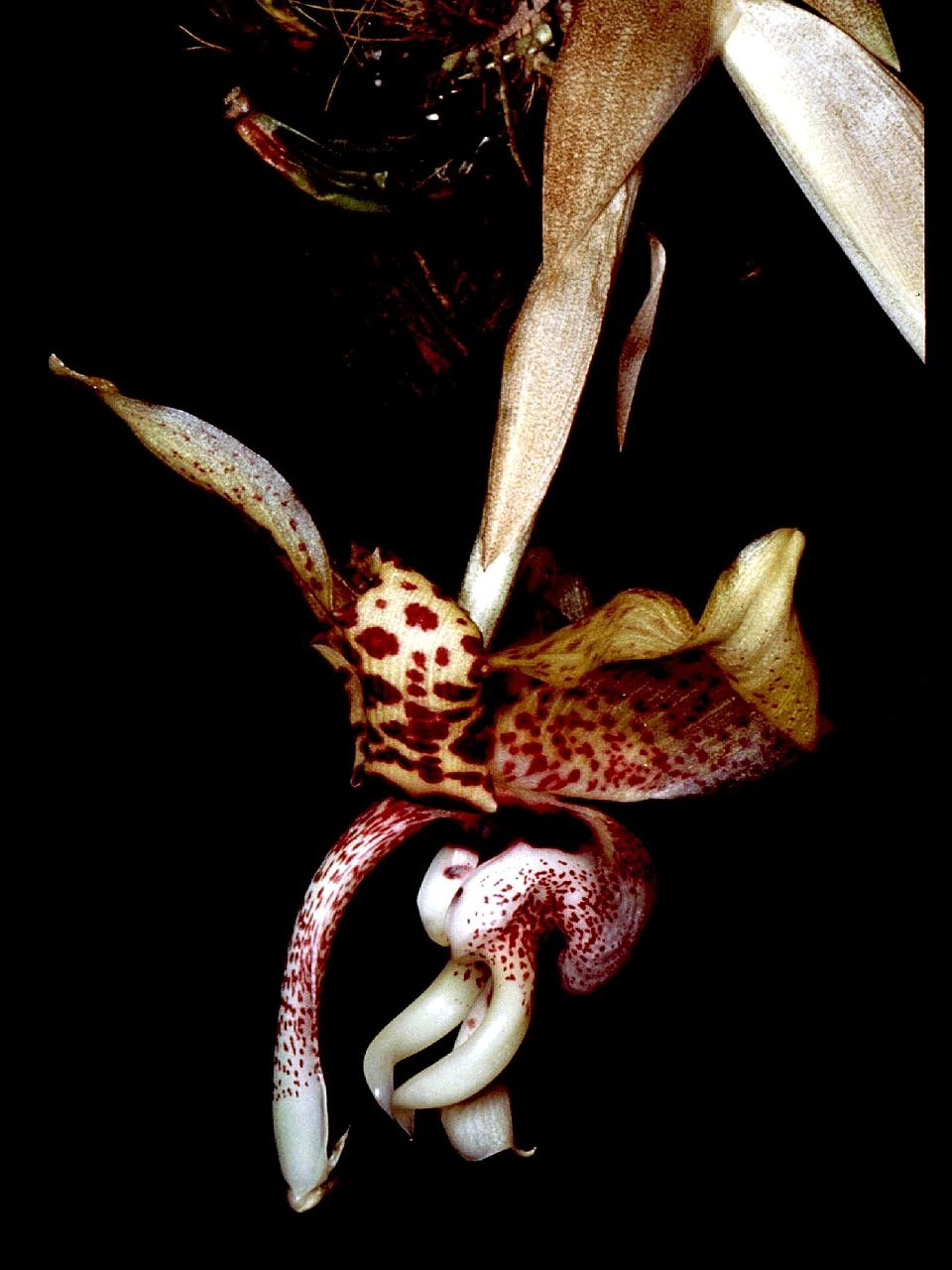
Stanhopea hernandezii

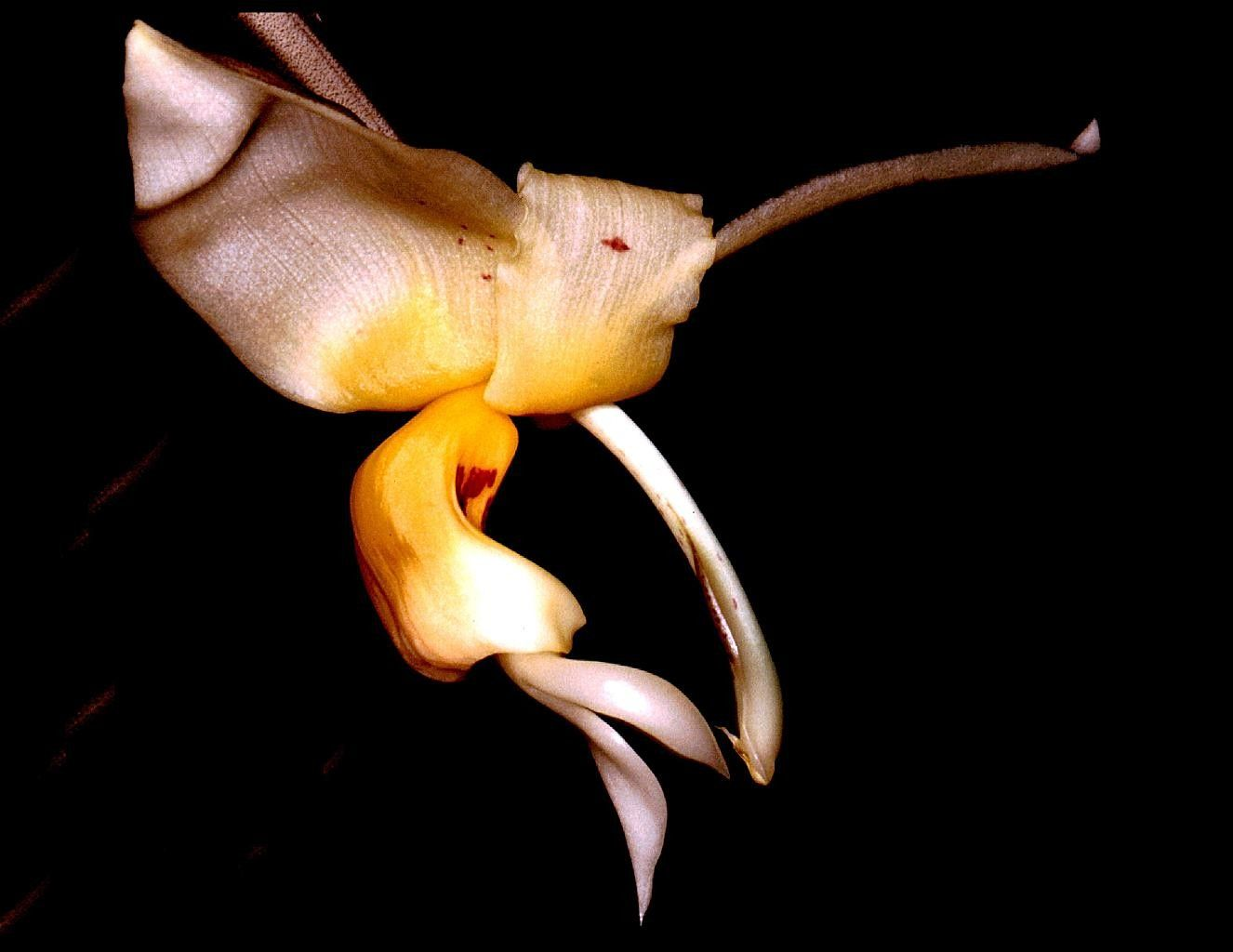
Stanhopea impressa

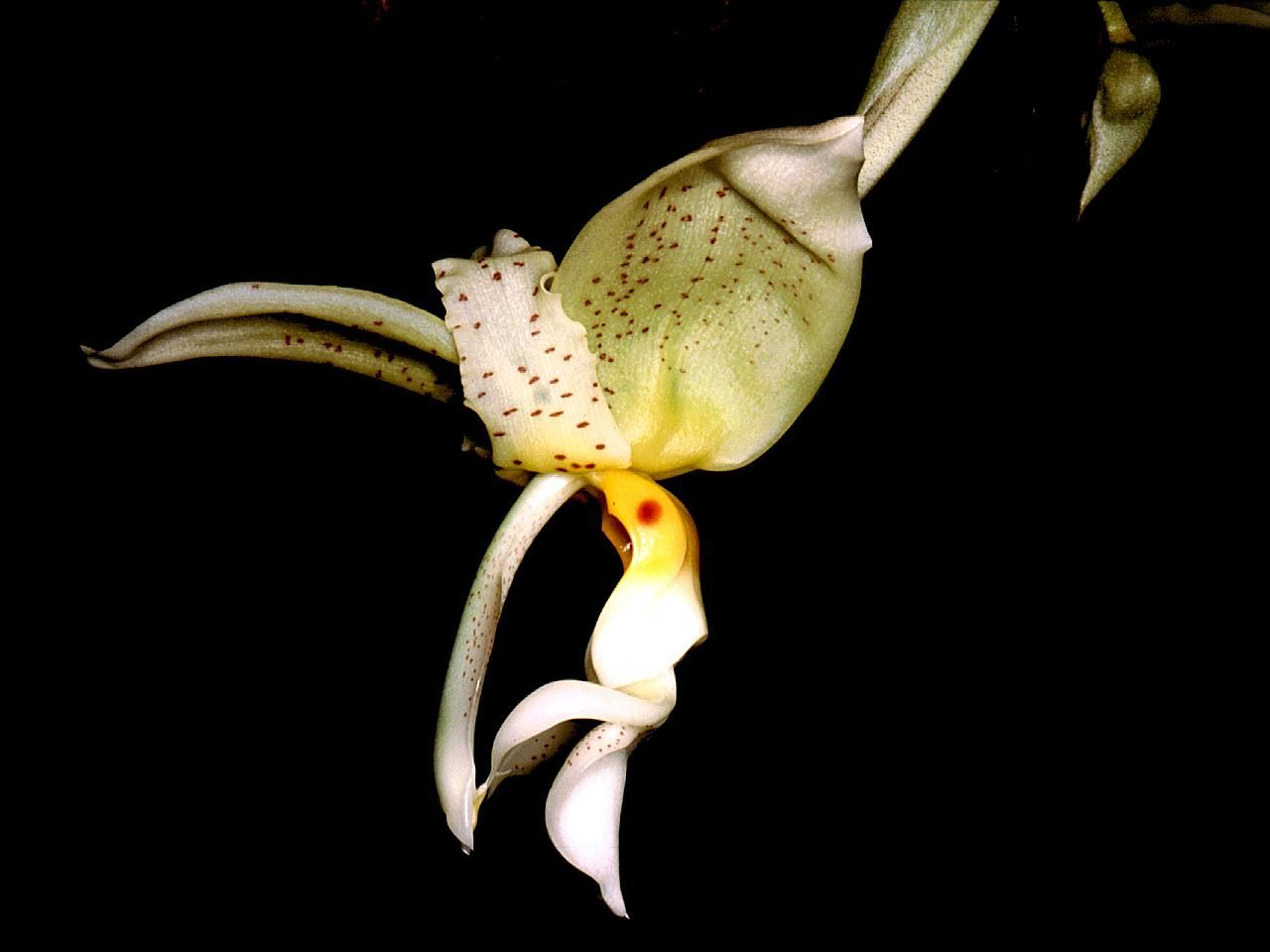
Stanhopea inodora

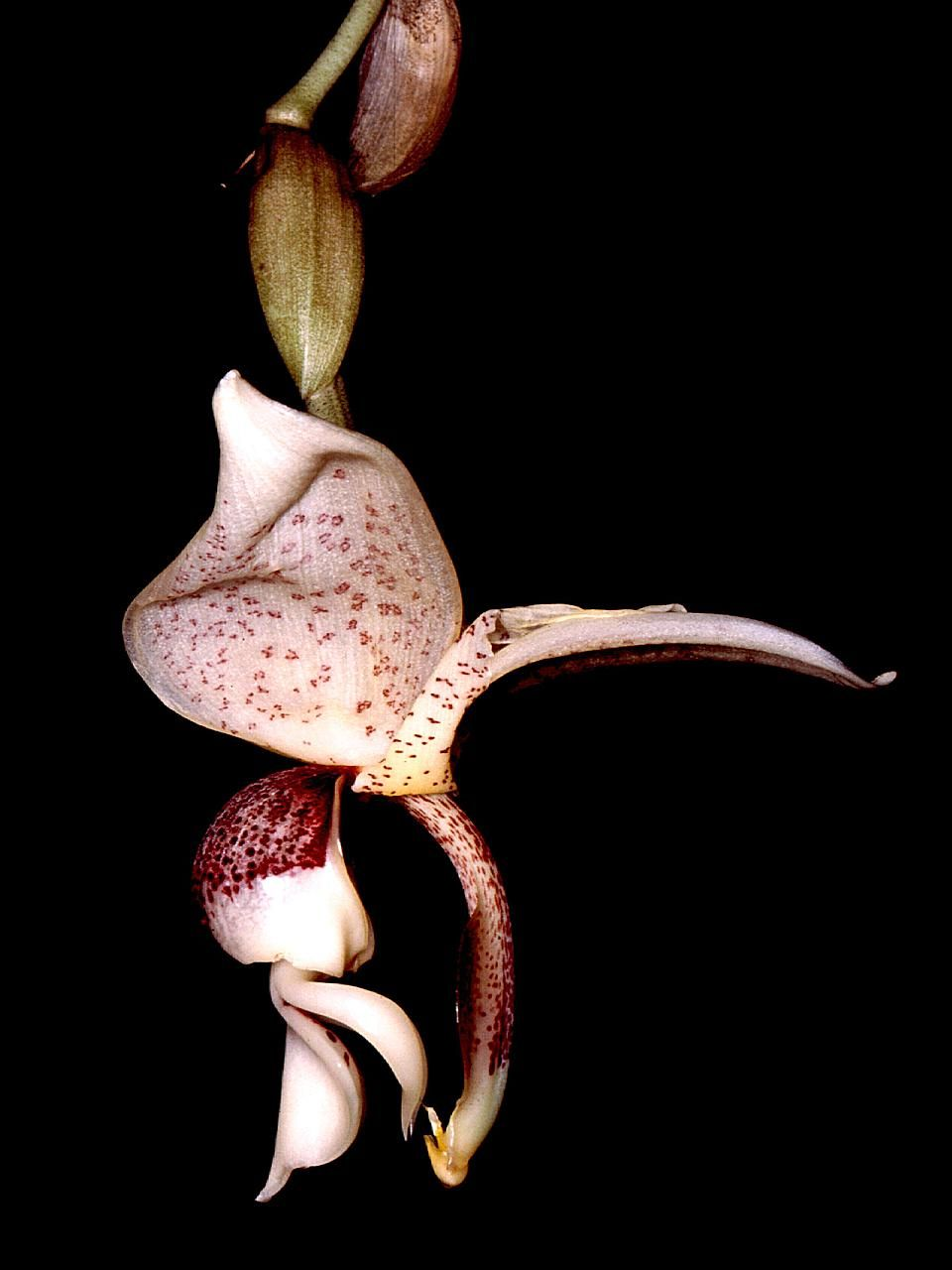
Stanhopea insignis

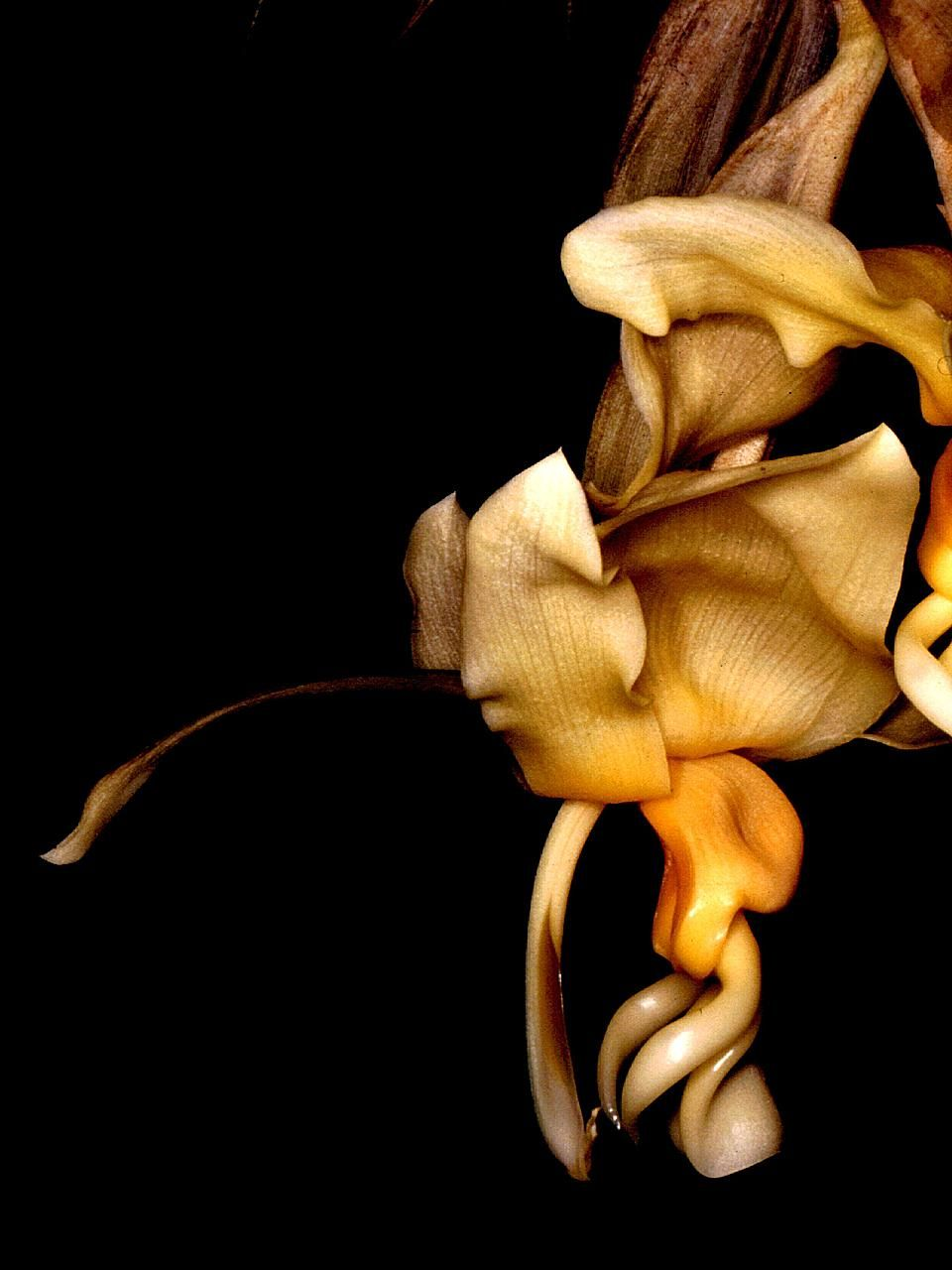
Stanhopea intermedia

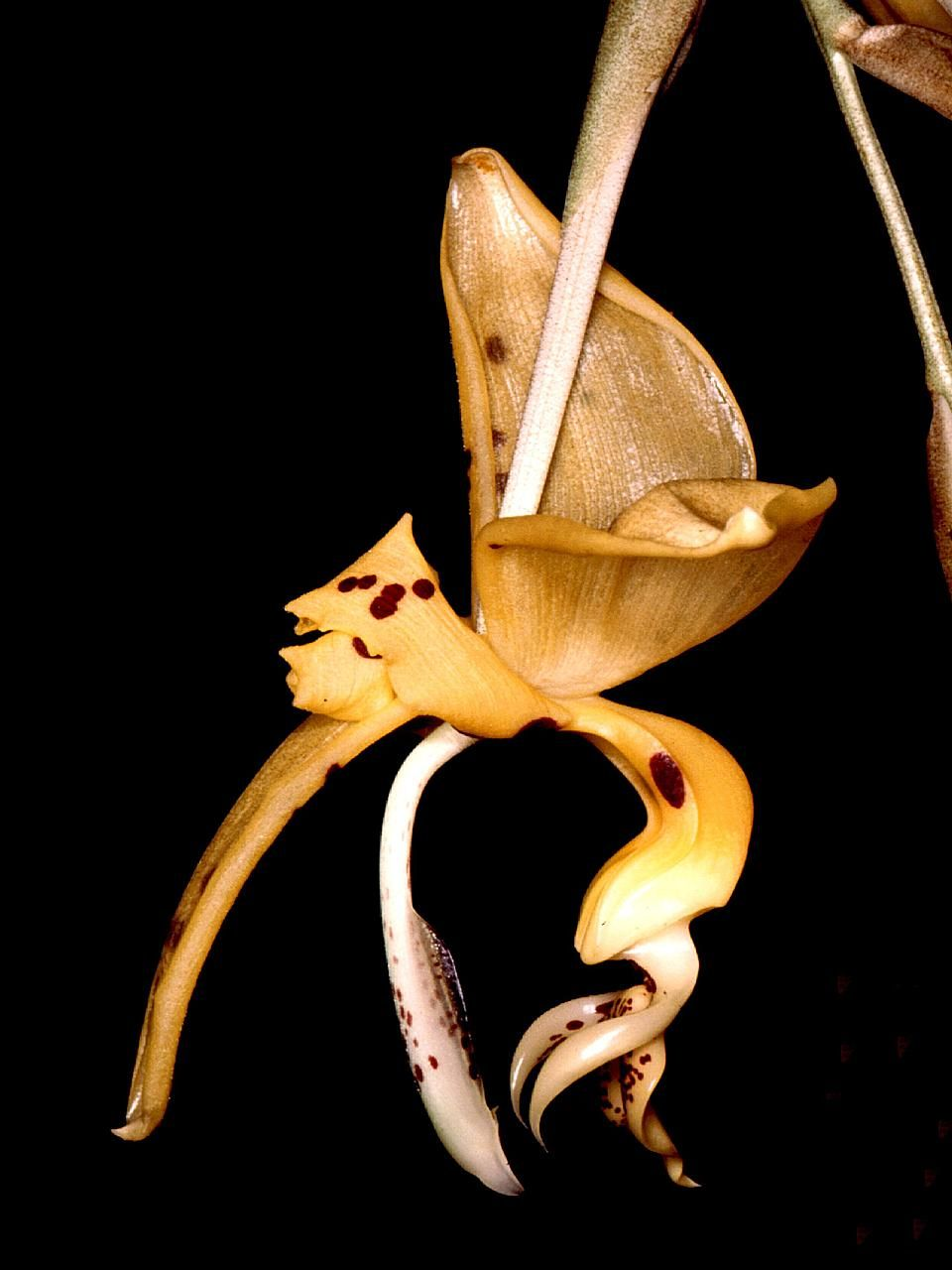
Stanhopea jenischiana

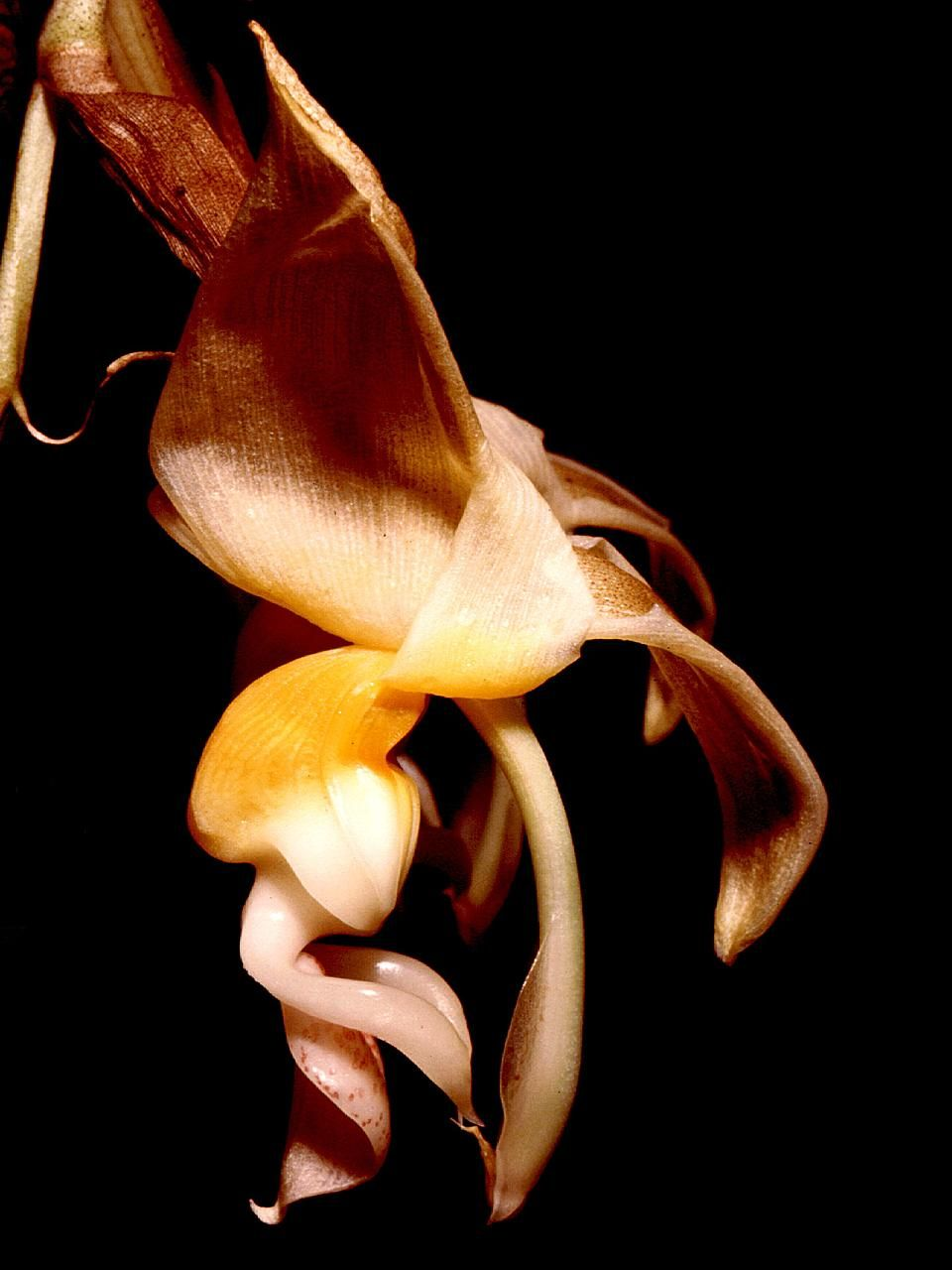
Stanhopea lietzei

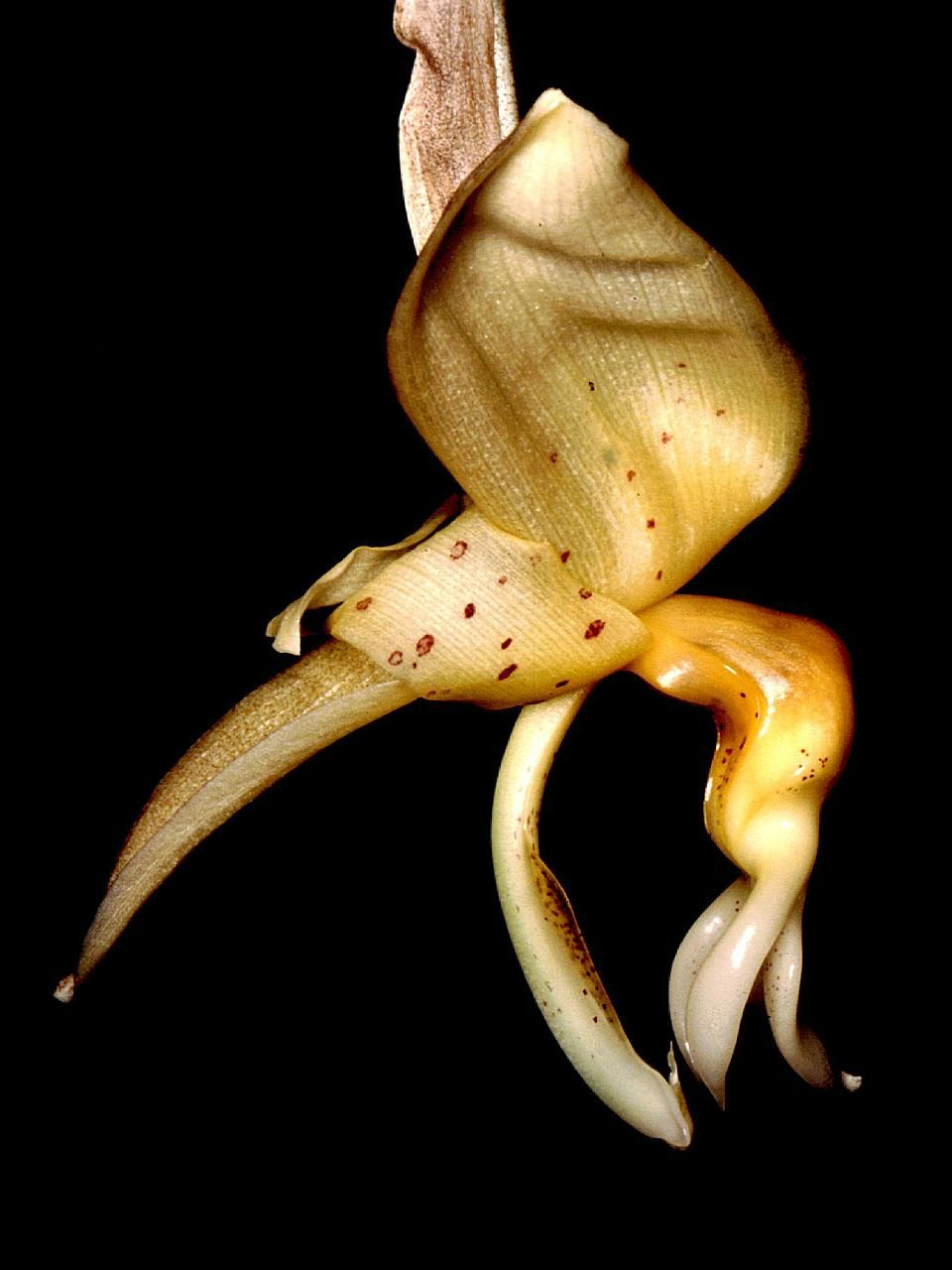
Stanhopea maculosa

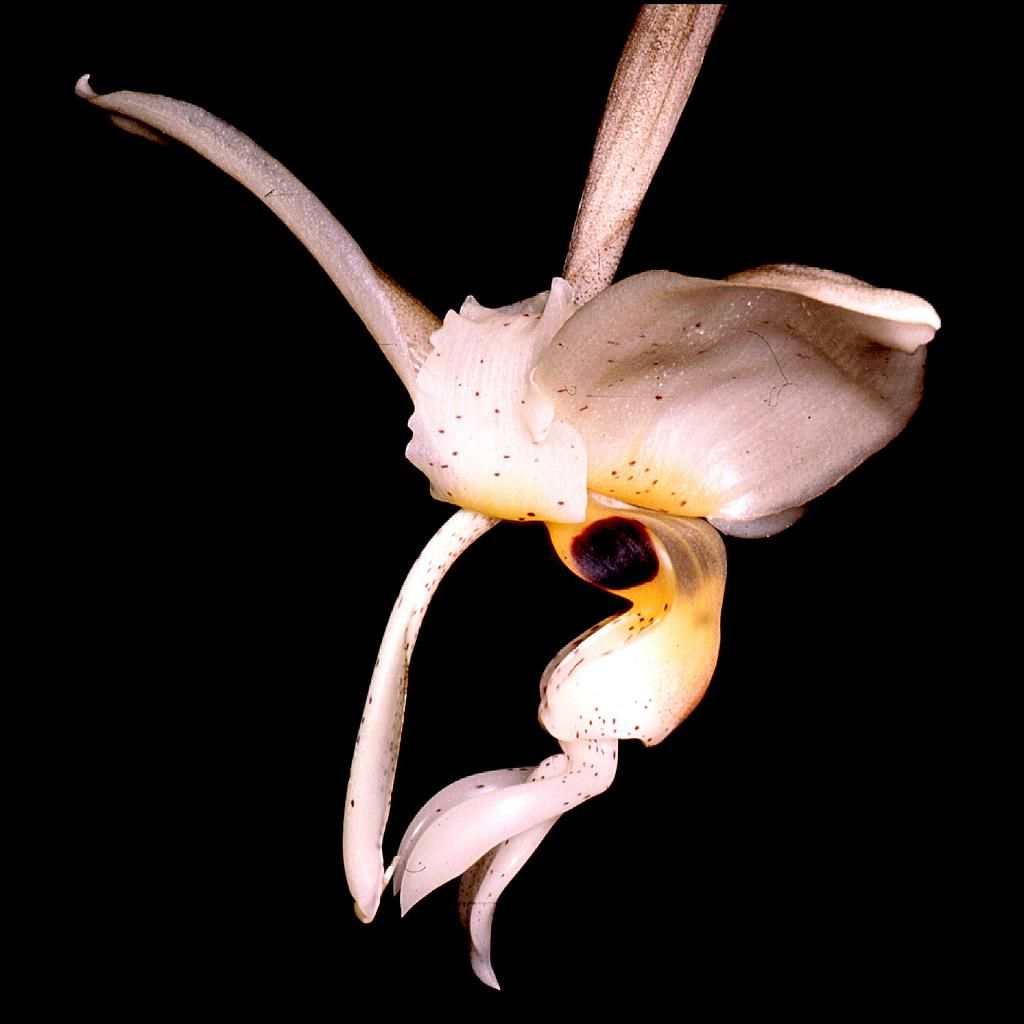
Stanhopea nigripes

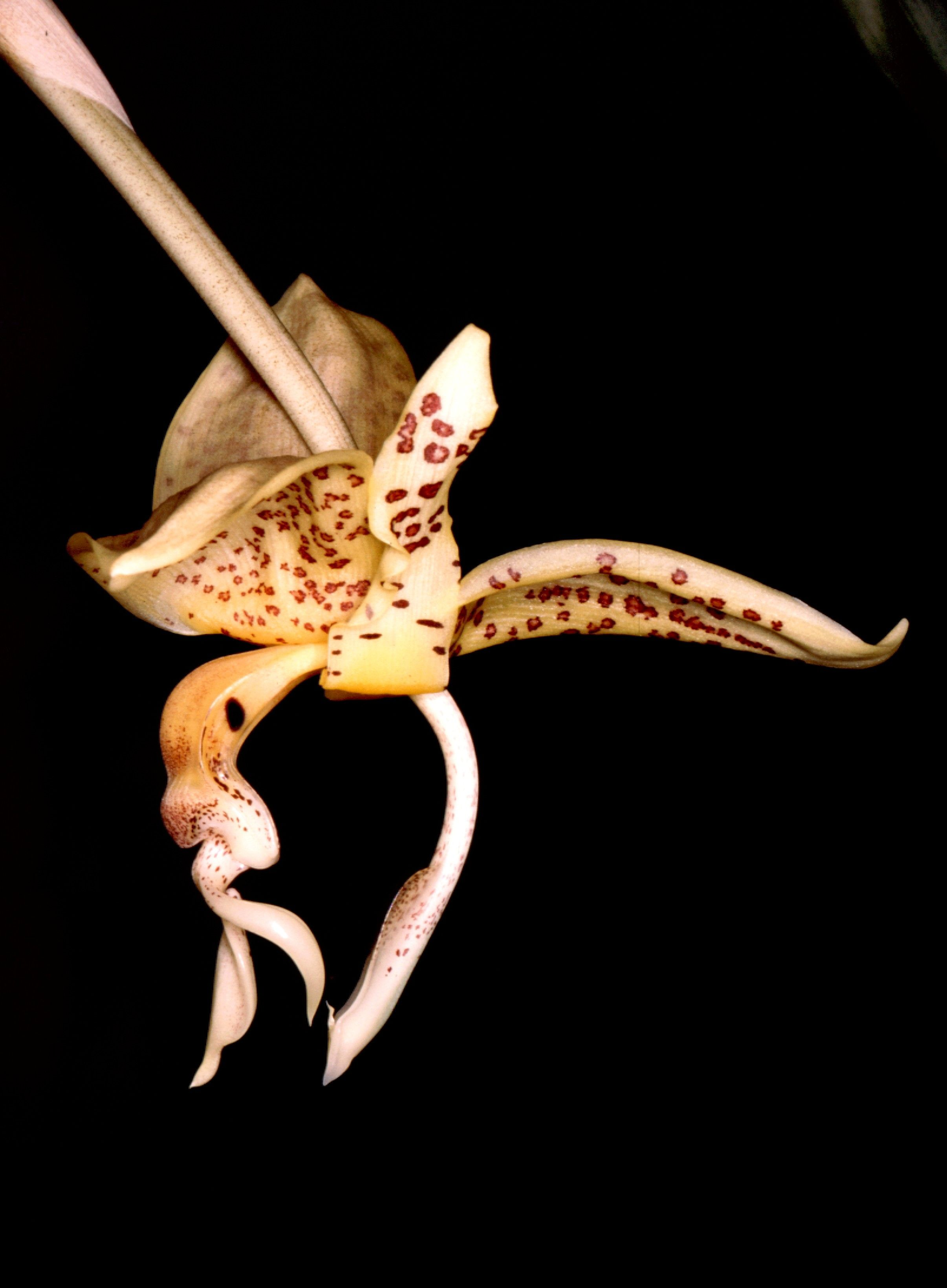
Stanhopea oculata

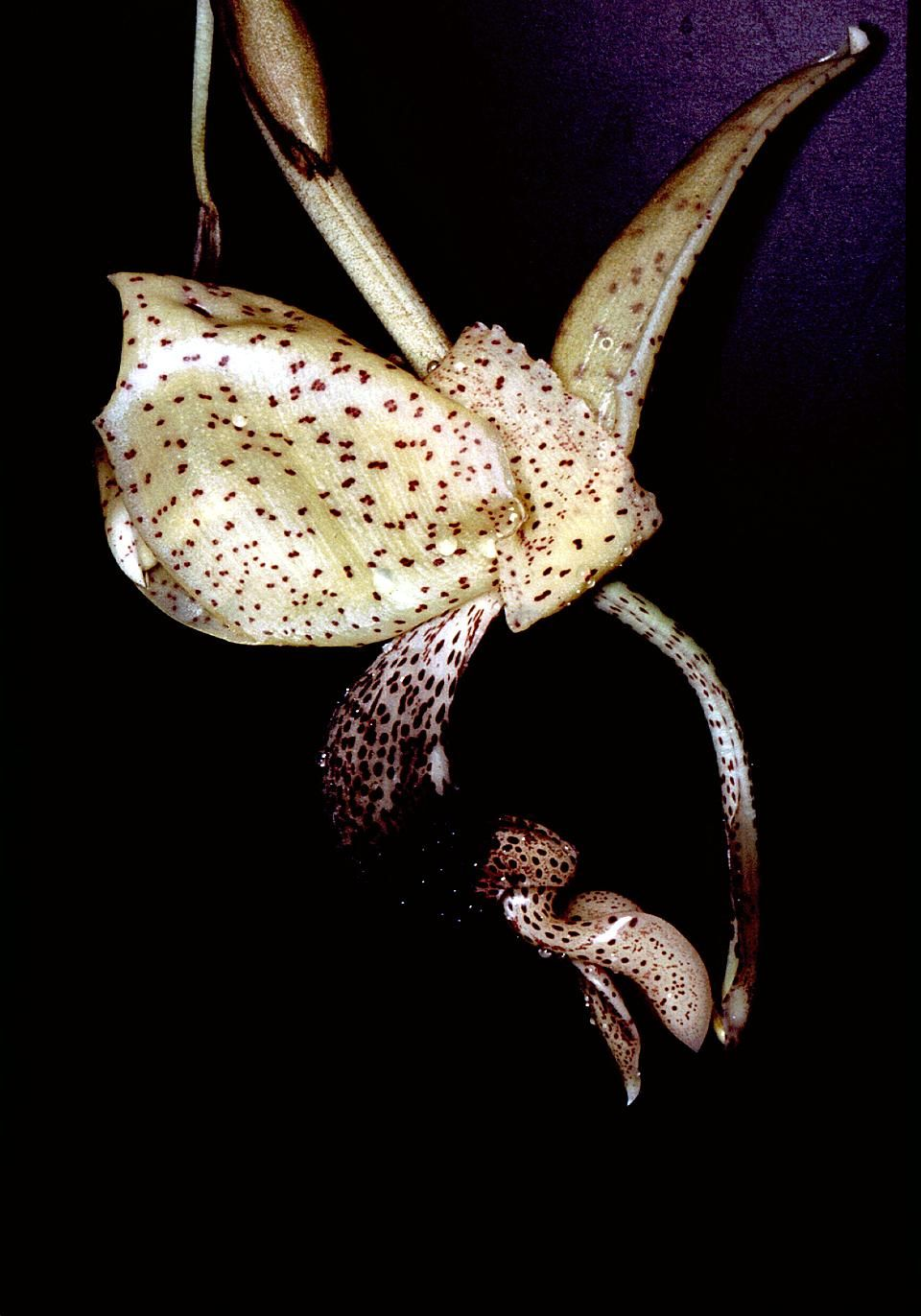
Stanhopea platyceras

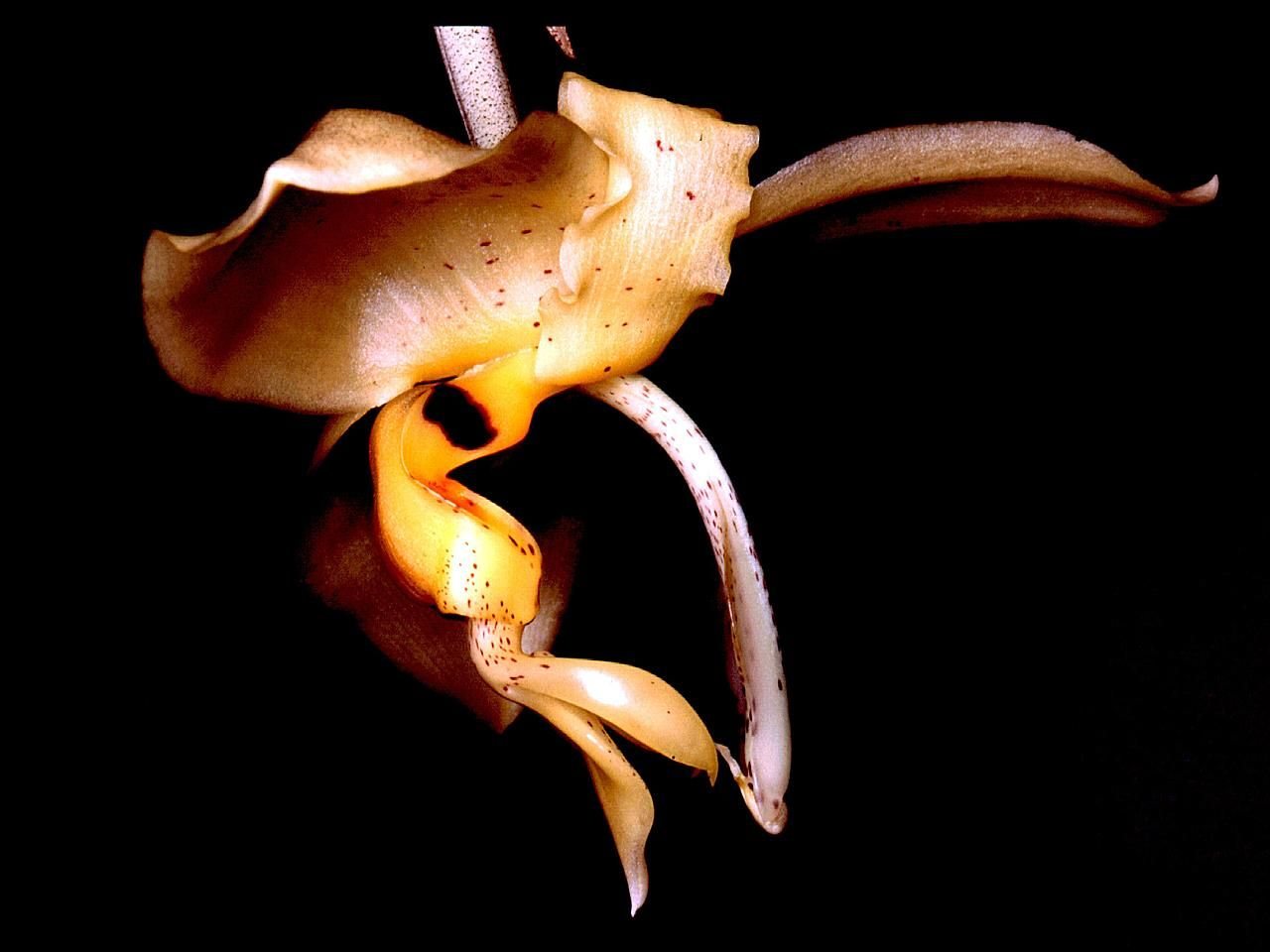
Stanhopea pozoi

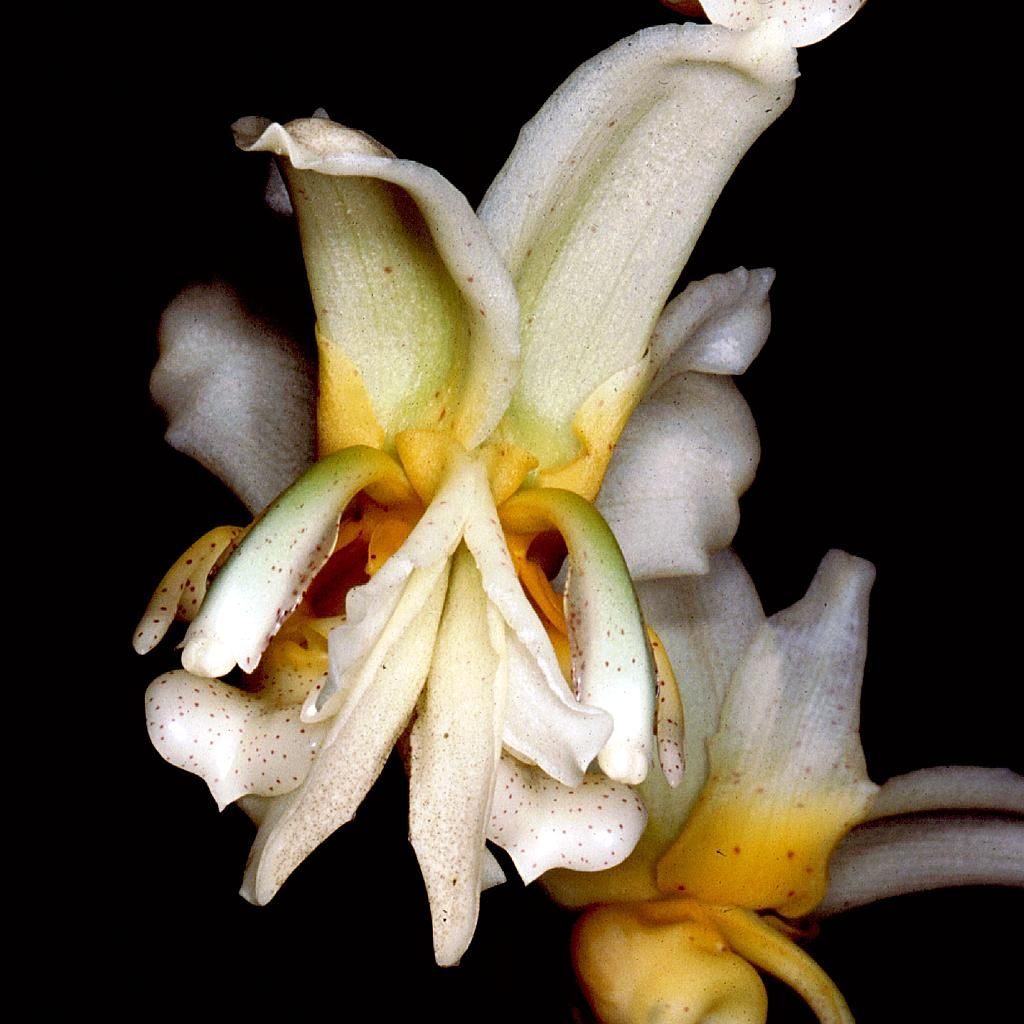
Stanhopea pseudoradiosa

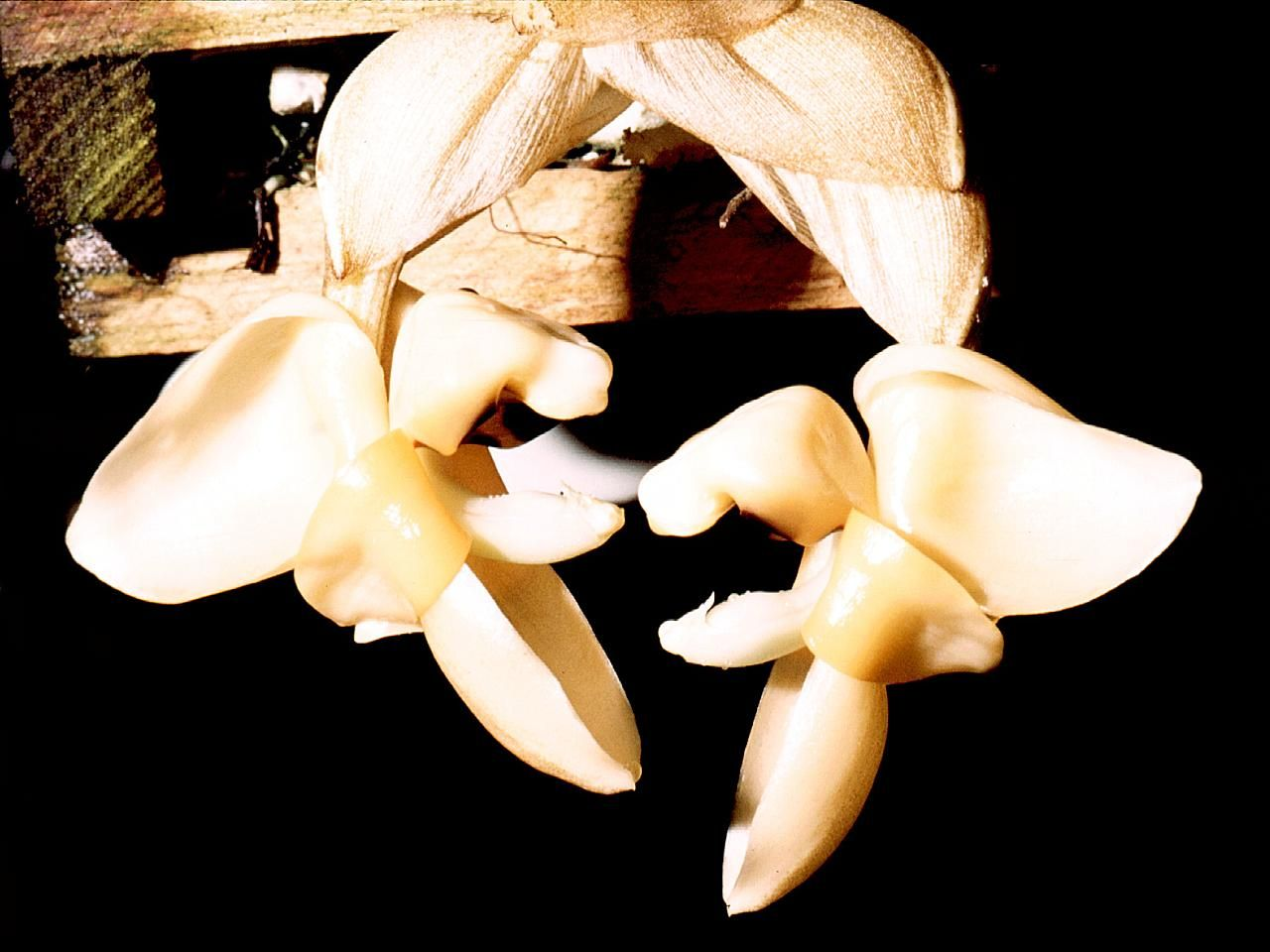
Stanhopea pulla

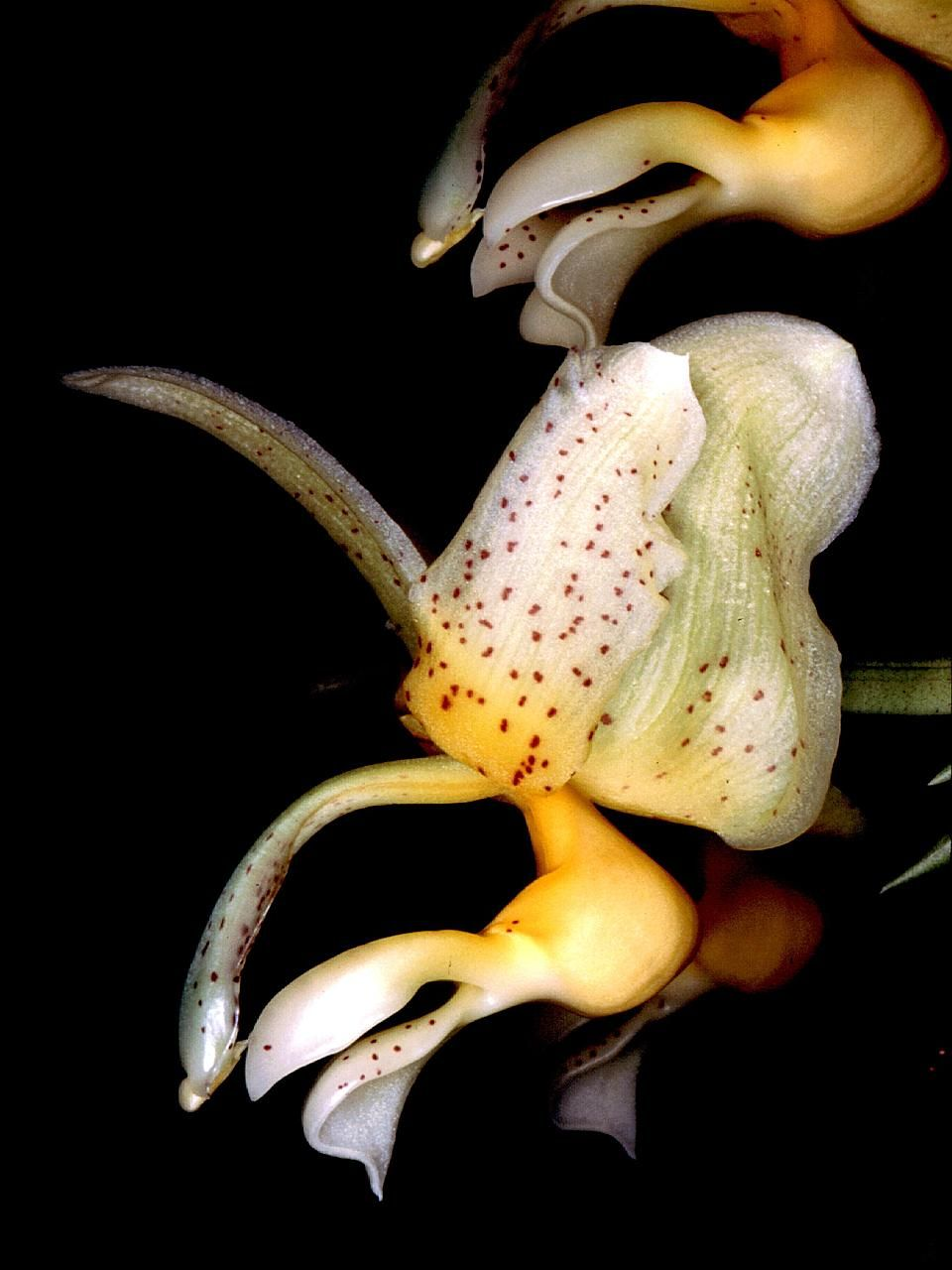
Stanhopea radiosa

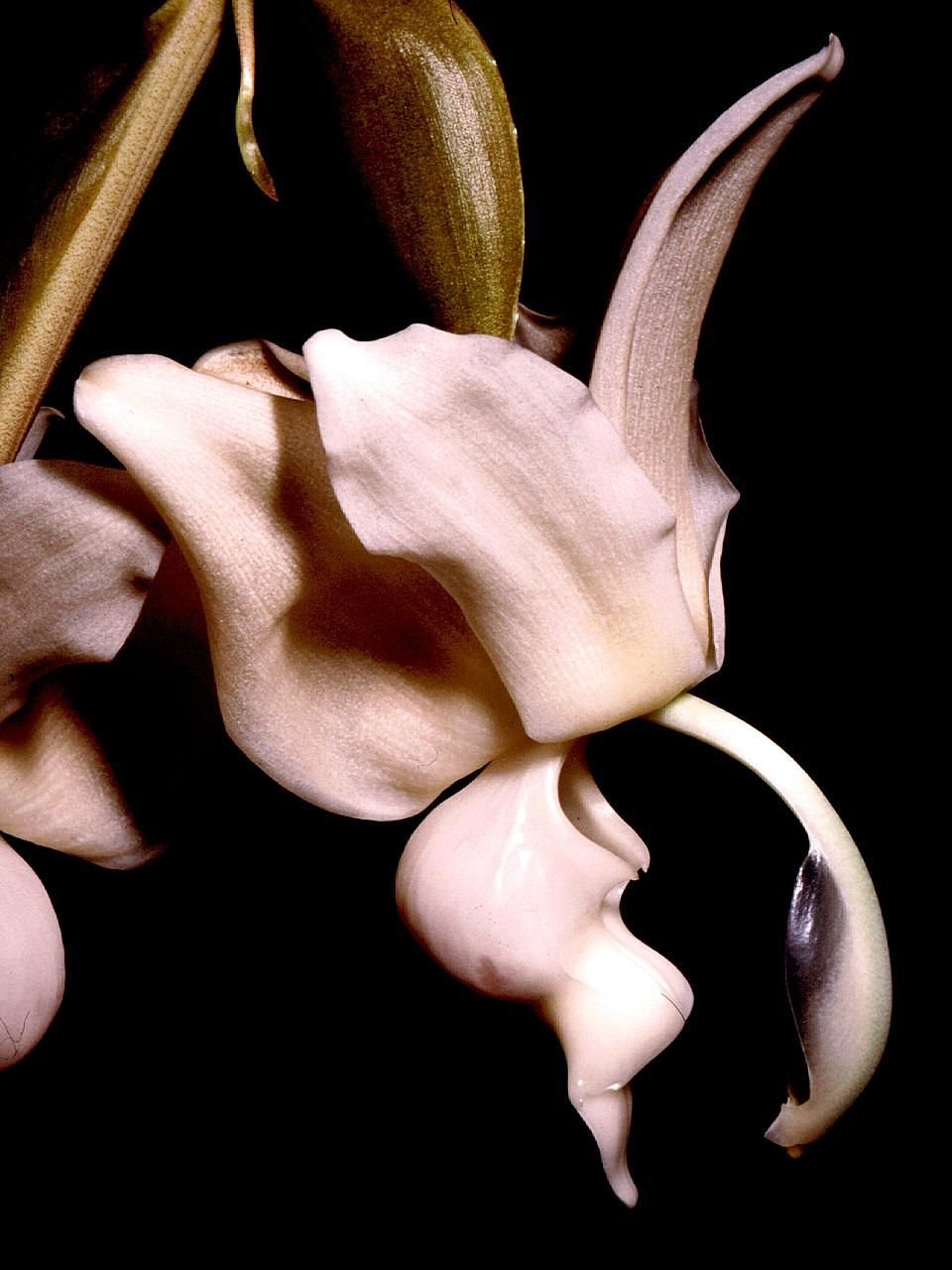
Stanhopea reichenbachiana

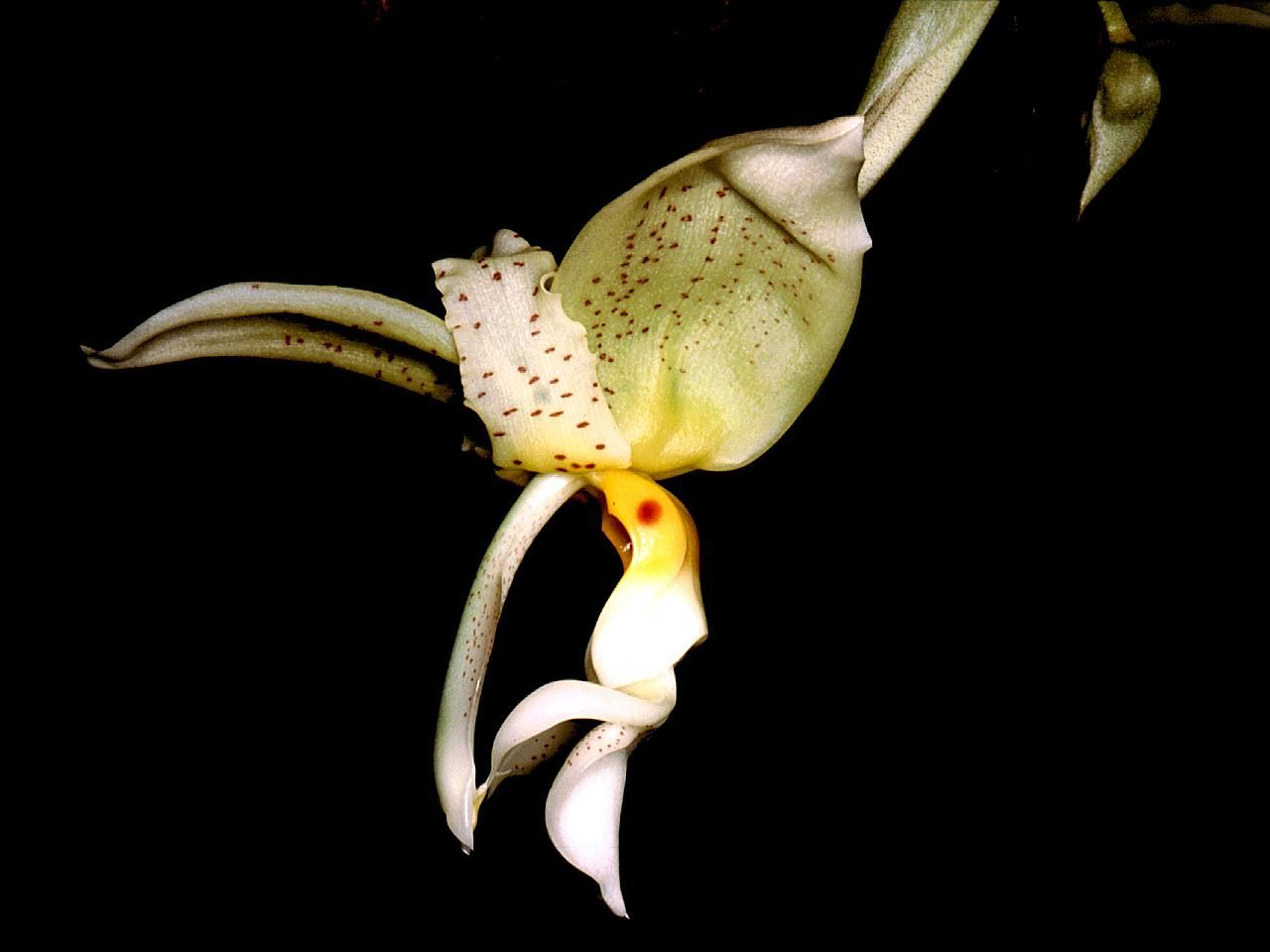
Stanhopea ruckeri

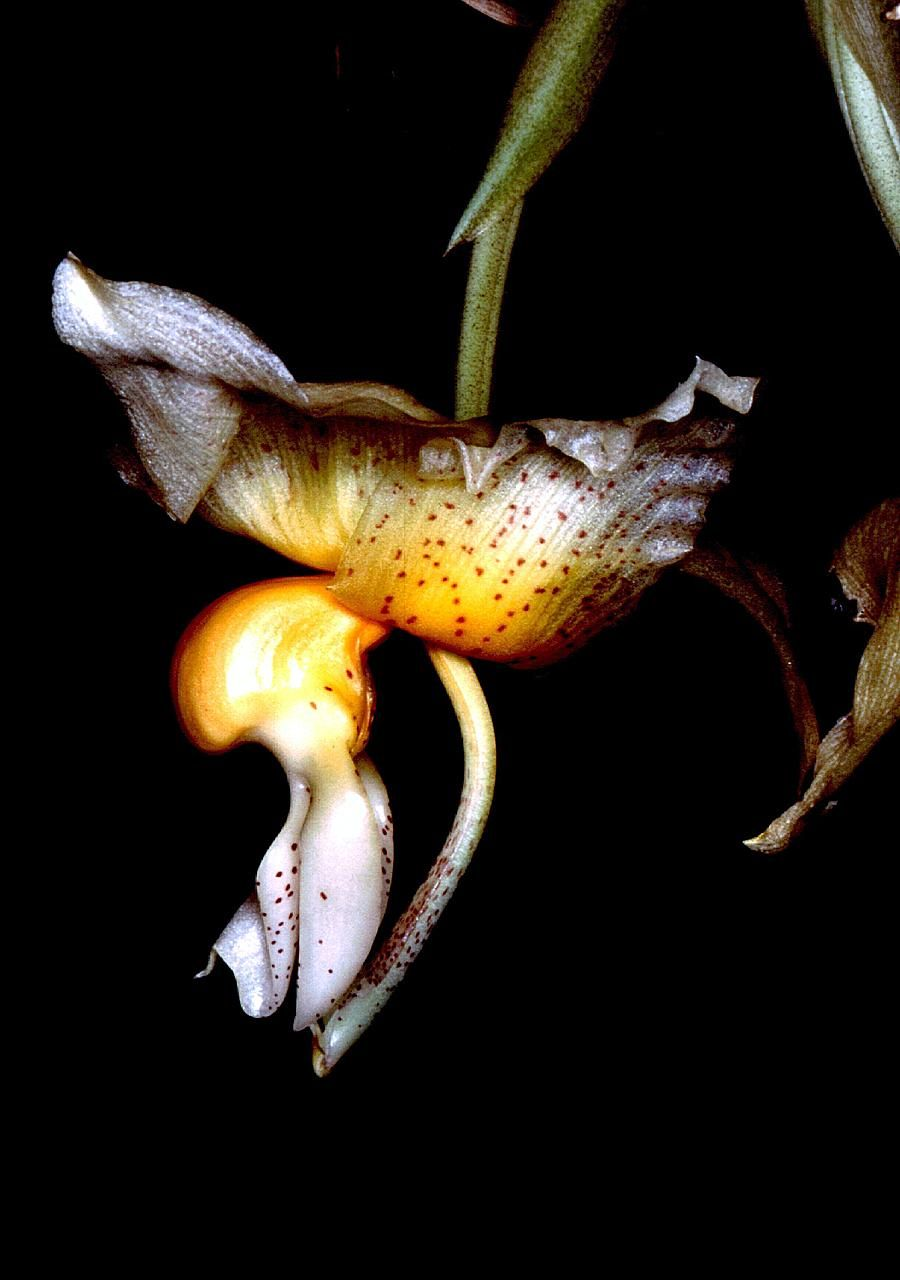
Stanhopea saccata

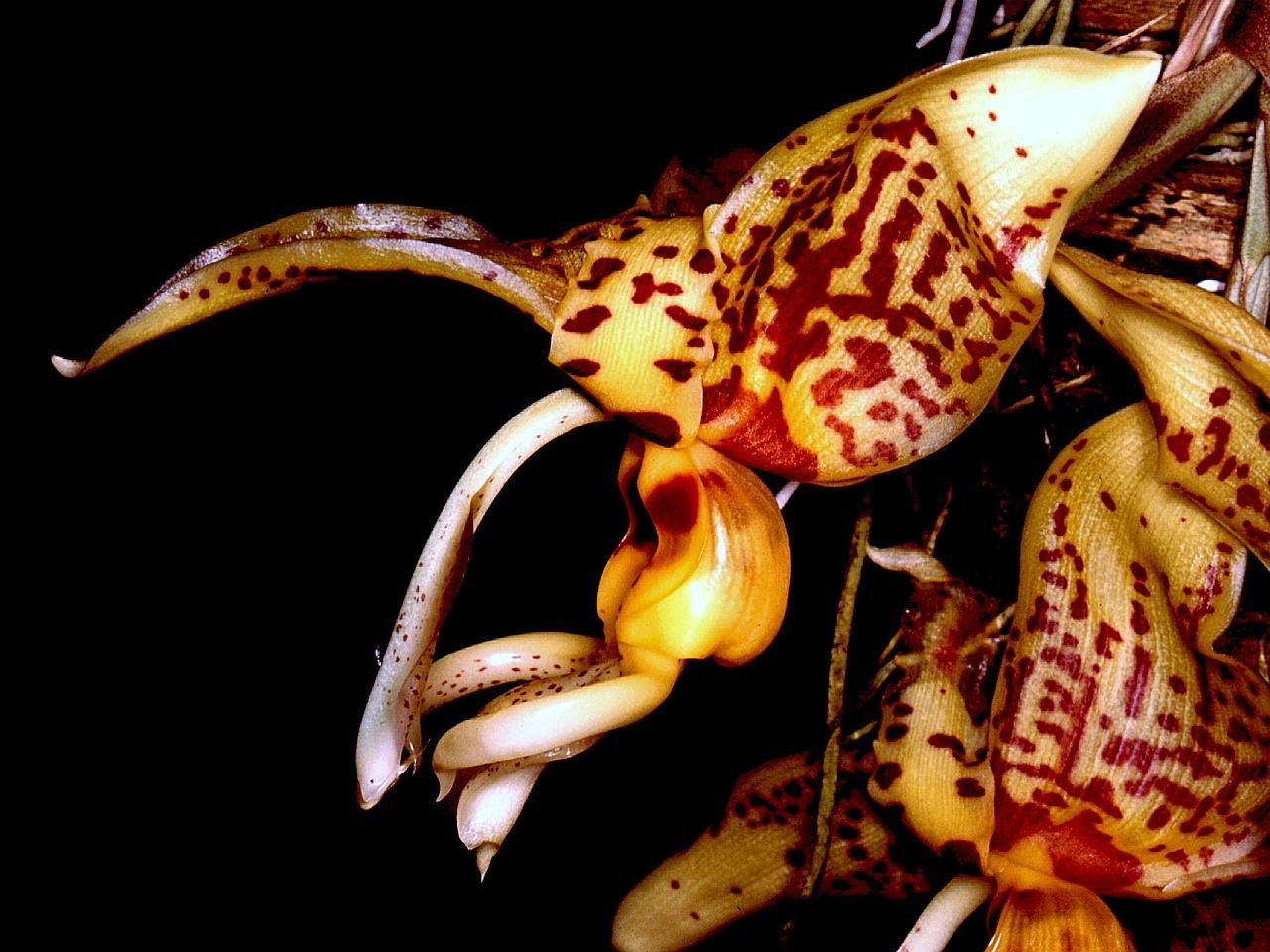
Stanhopea shuttleworthii

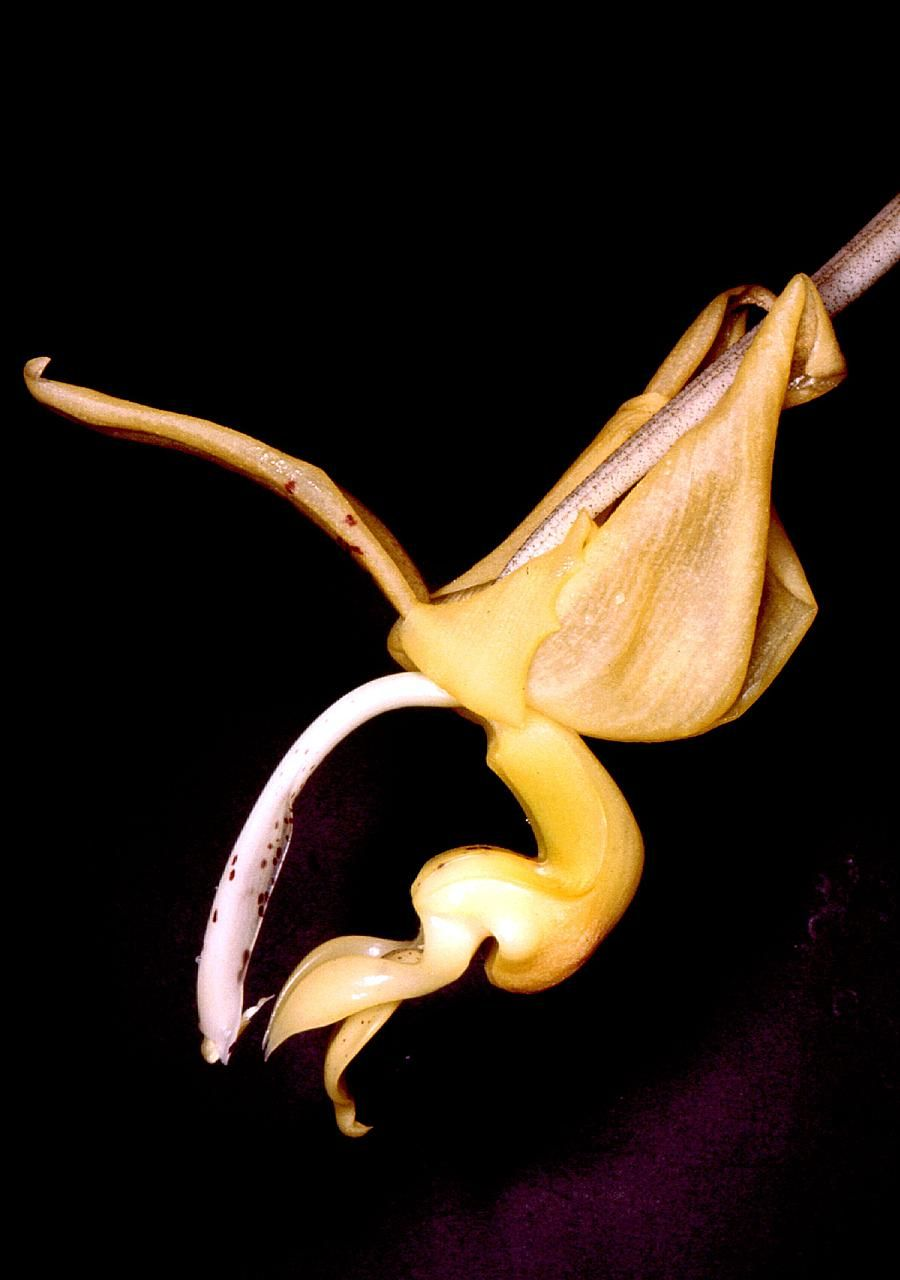
Stanhopea stevensonii

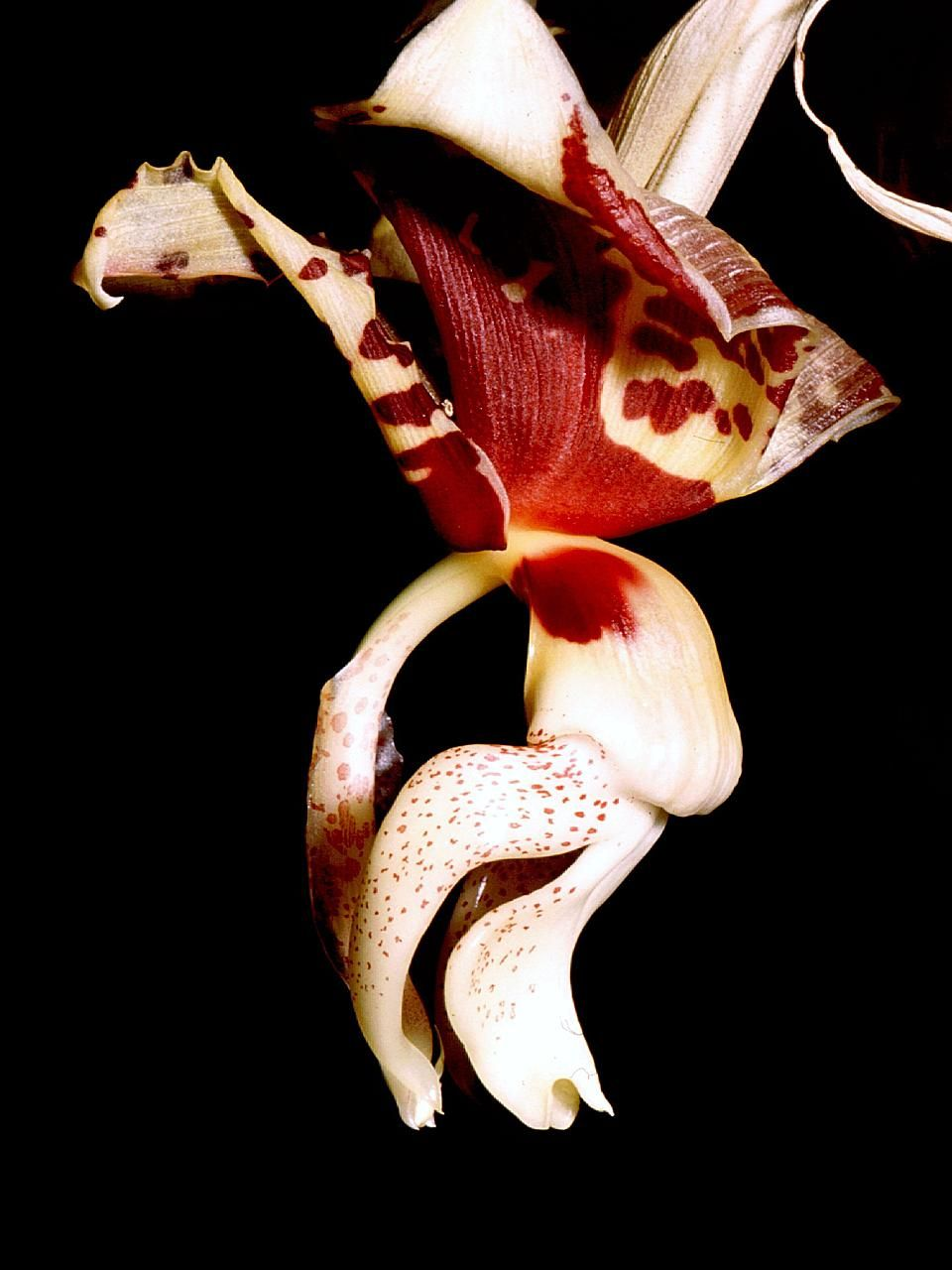
Stanhopea tigrina

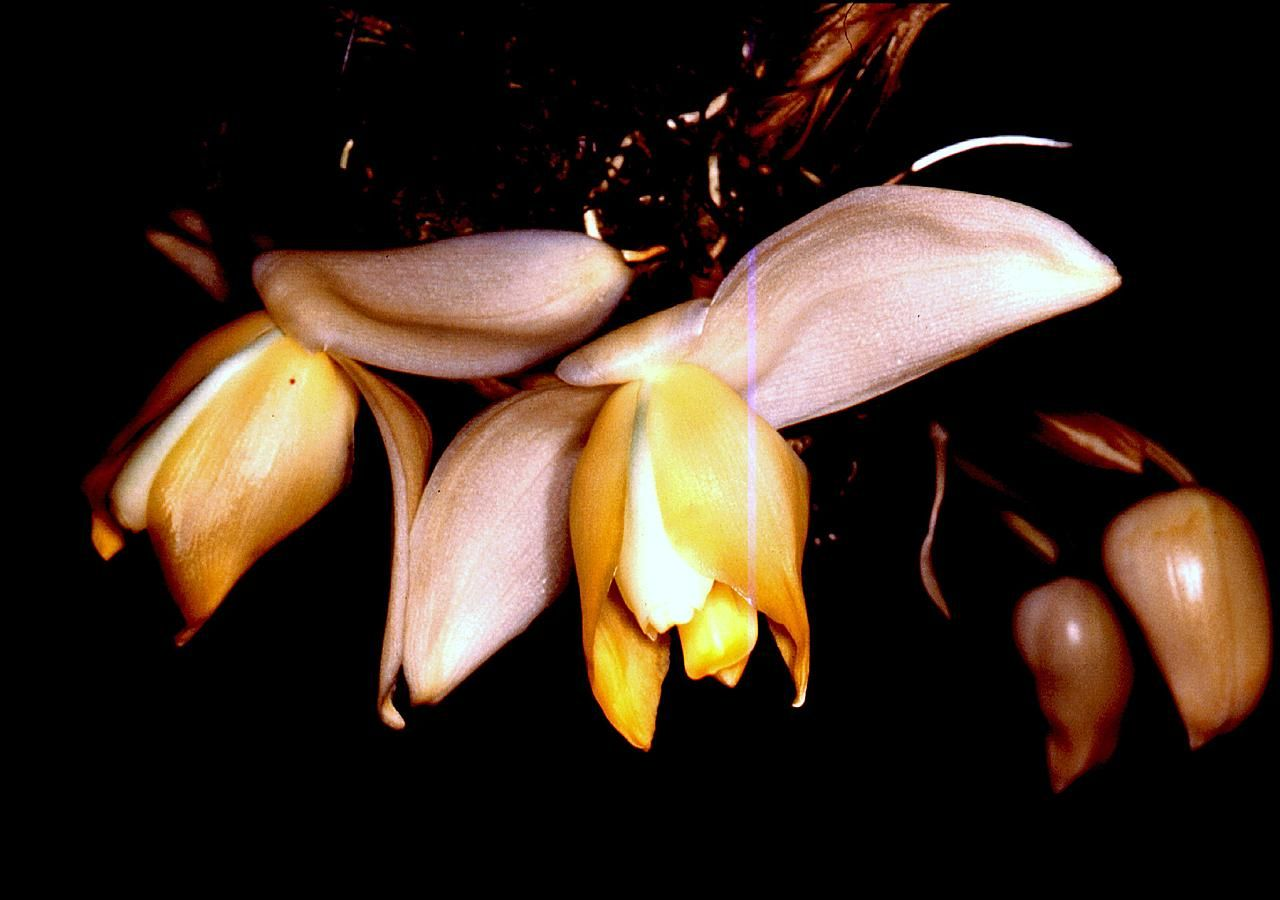
Stanhopea tricornis

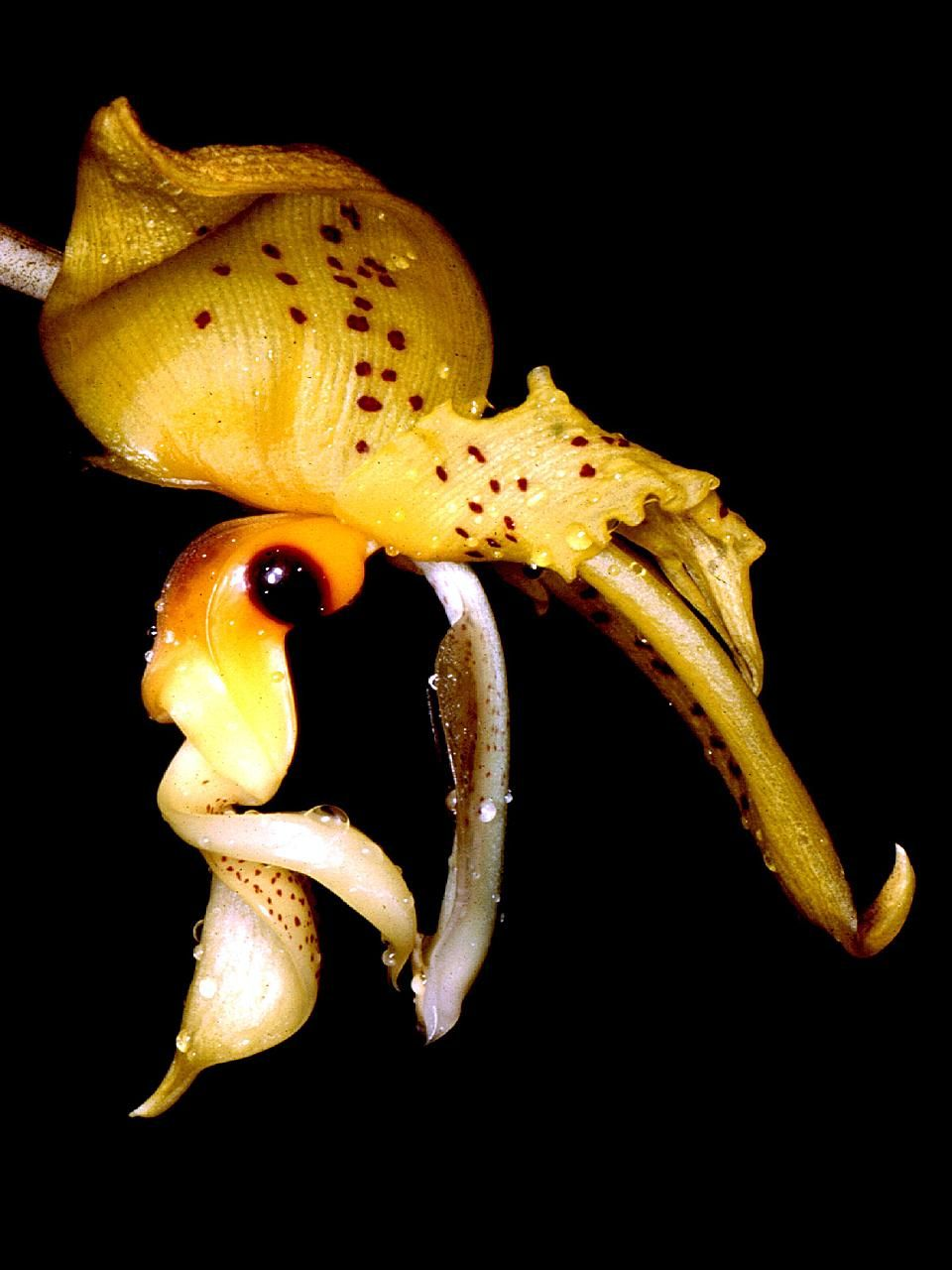
Stanhopea wardii

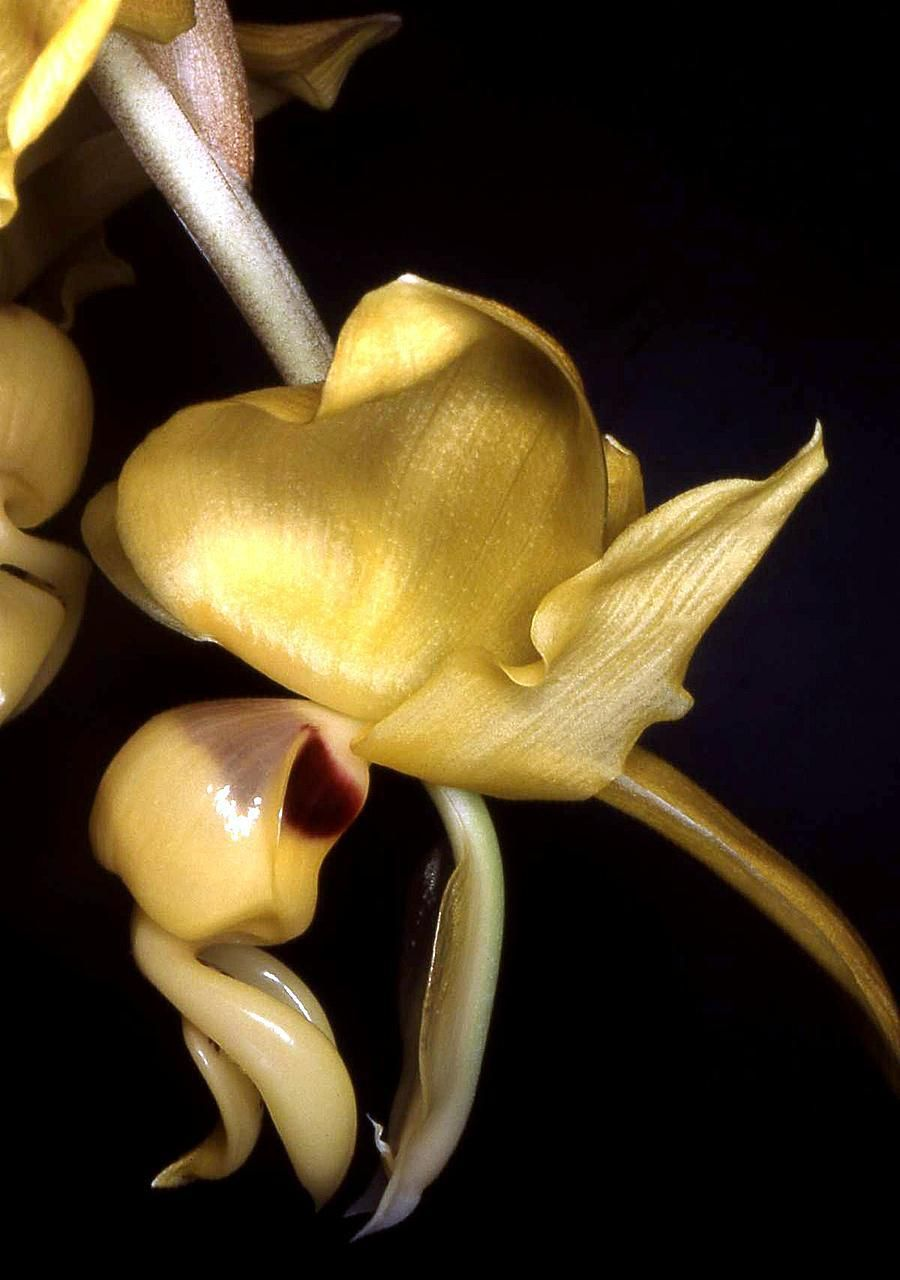
Stanhopea warszewicziana

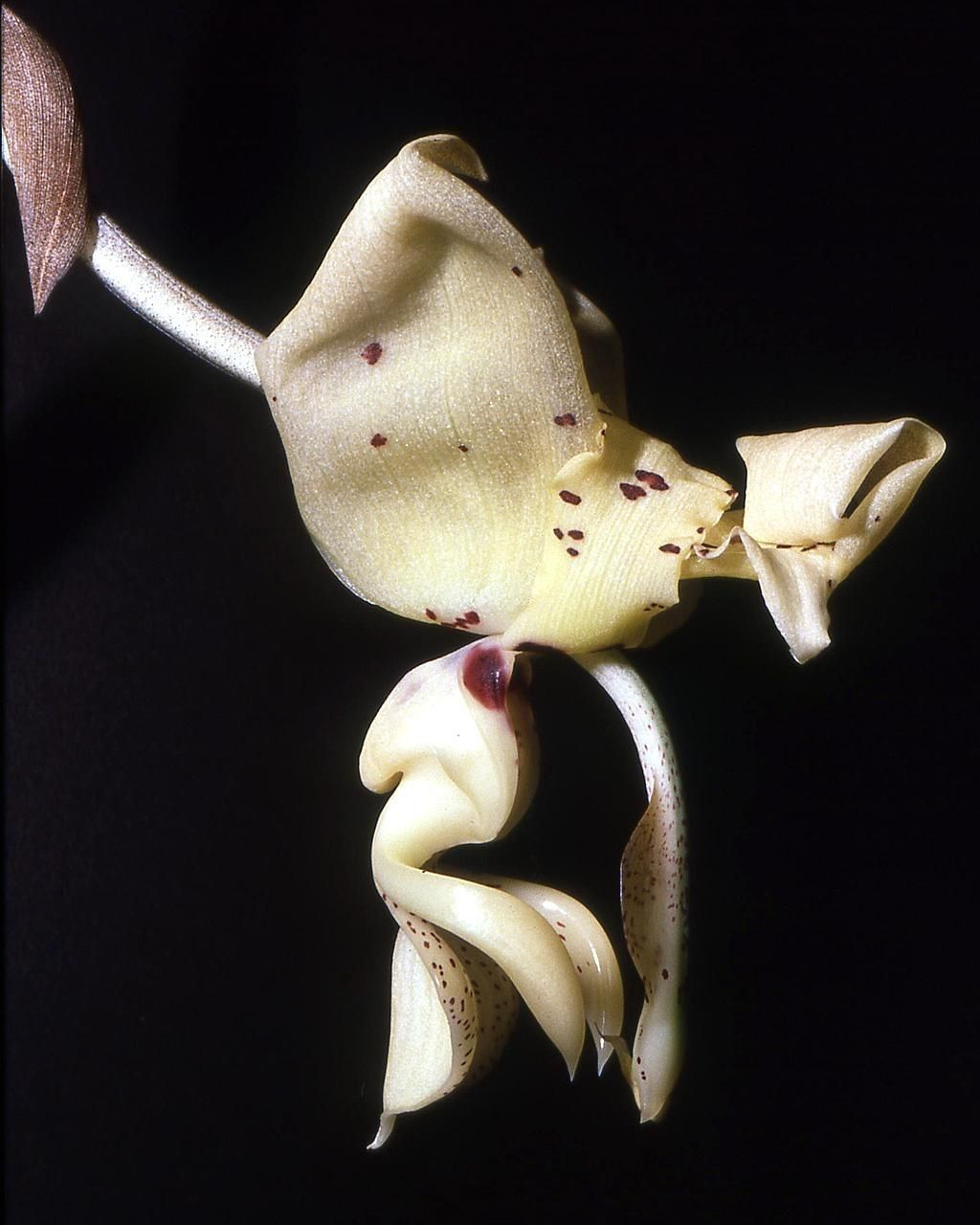
Stanhopea xytriophora

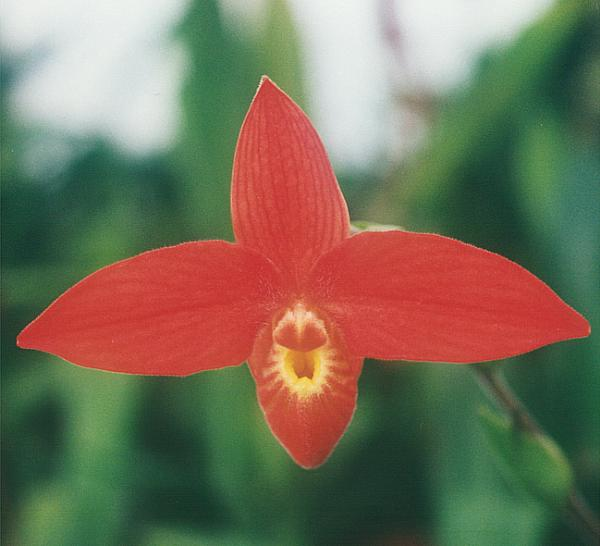
Phragmipedium besseae

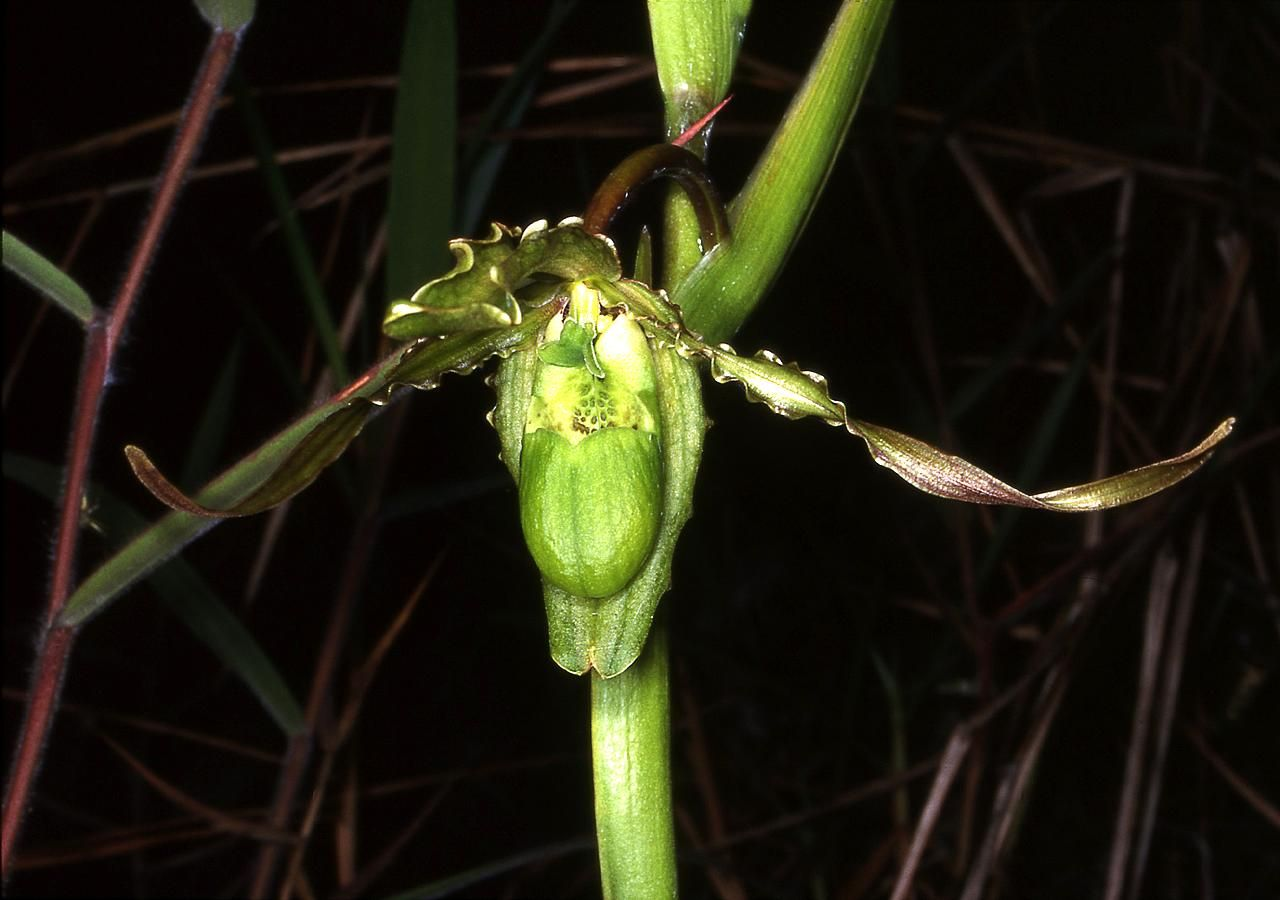
Phragmipedium boissierianum

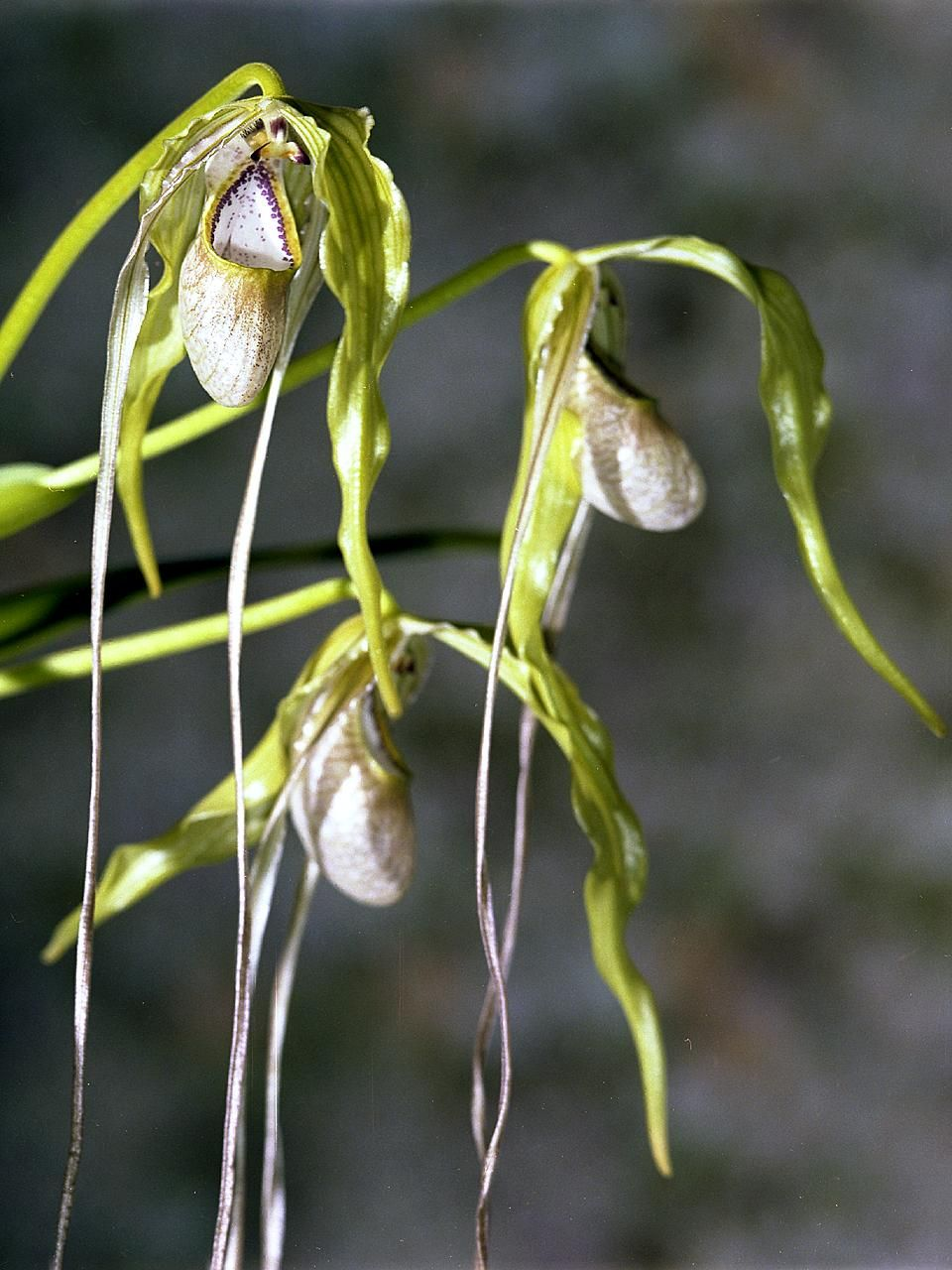
Phragmipedium caudatum

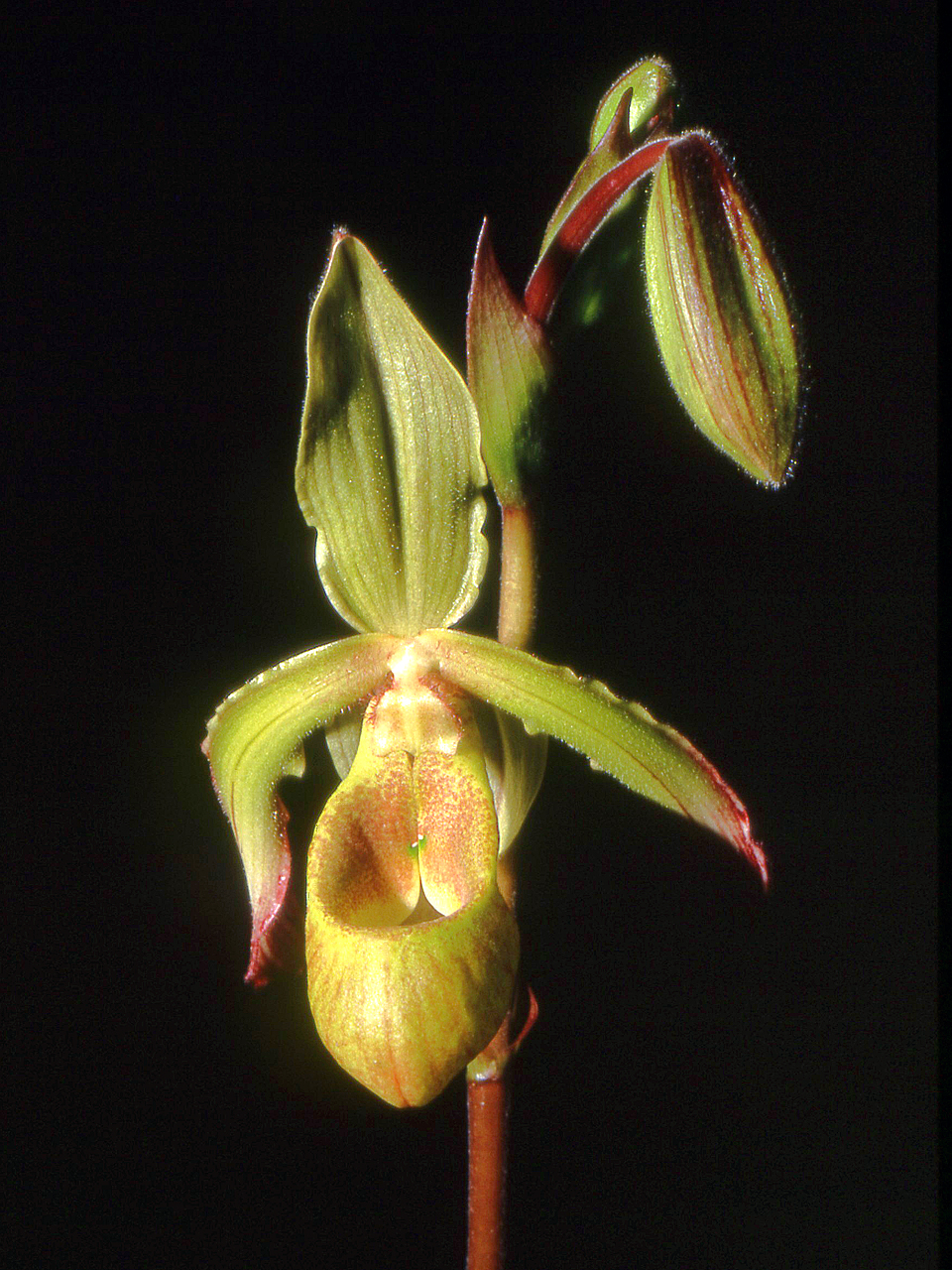
Phragmipedium lindleyanum

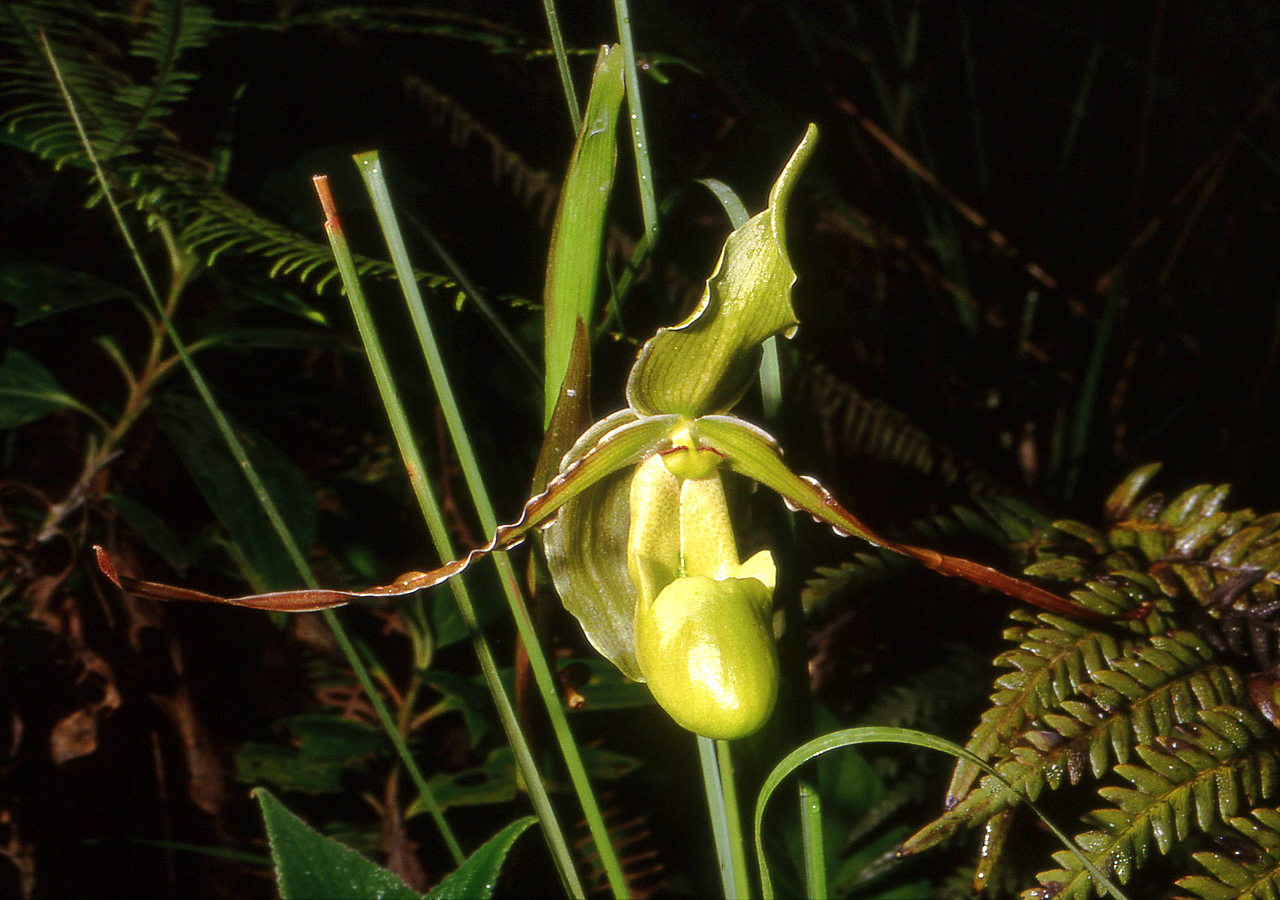
Phragmipedium longifolium

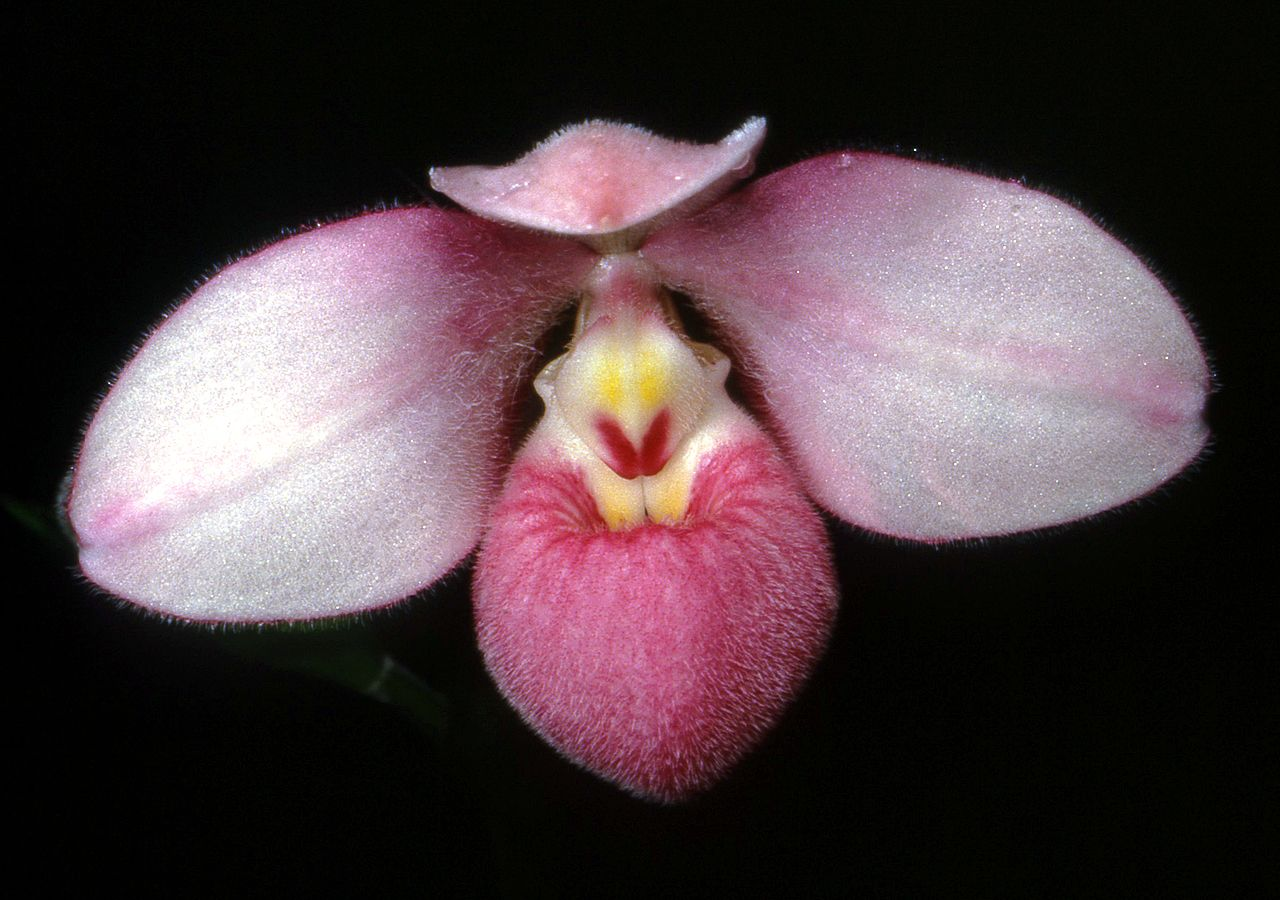
Phragmipedium schlimii

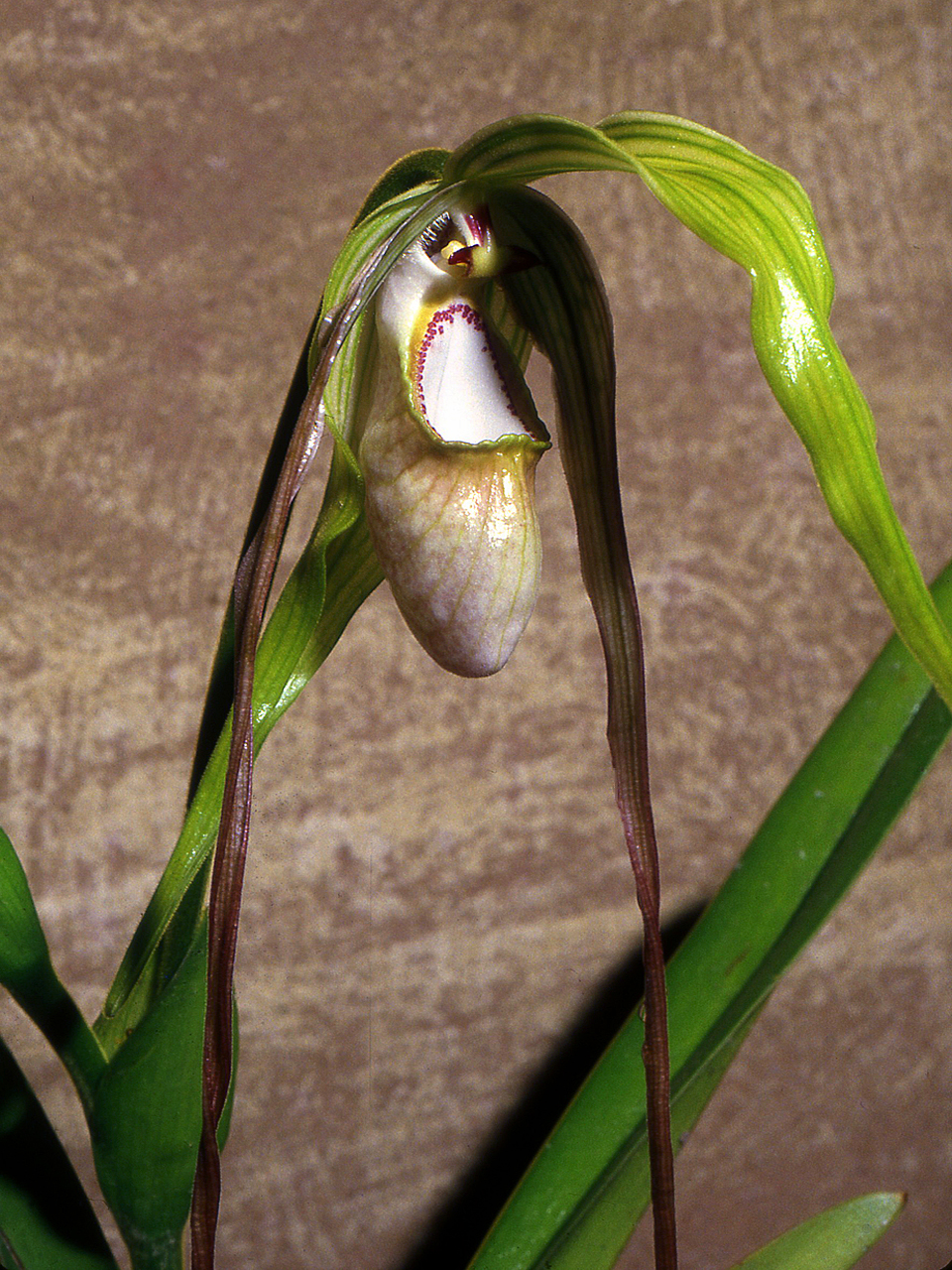
Phragmipedium warszewiczianum

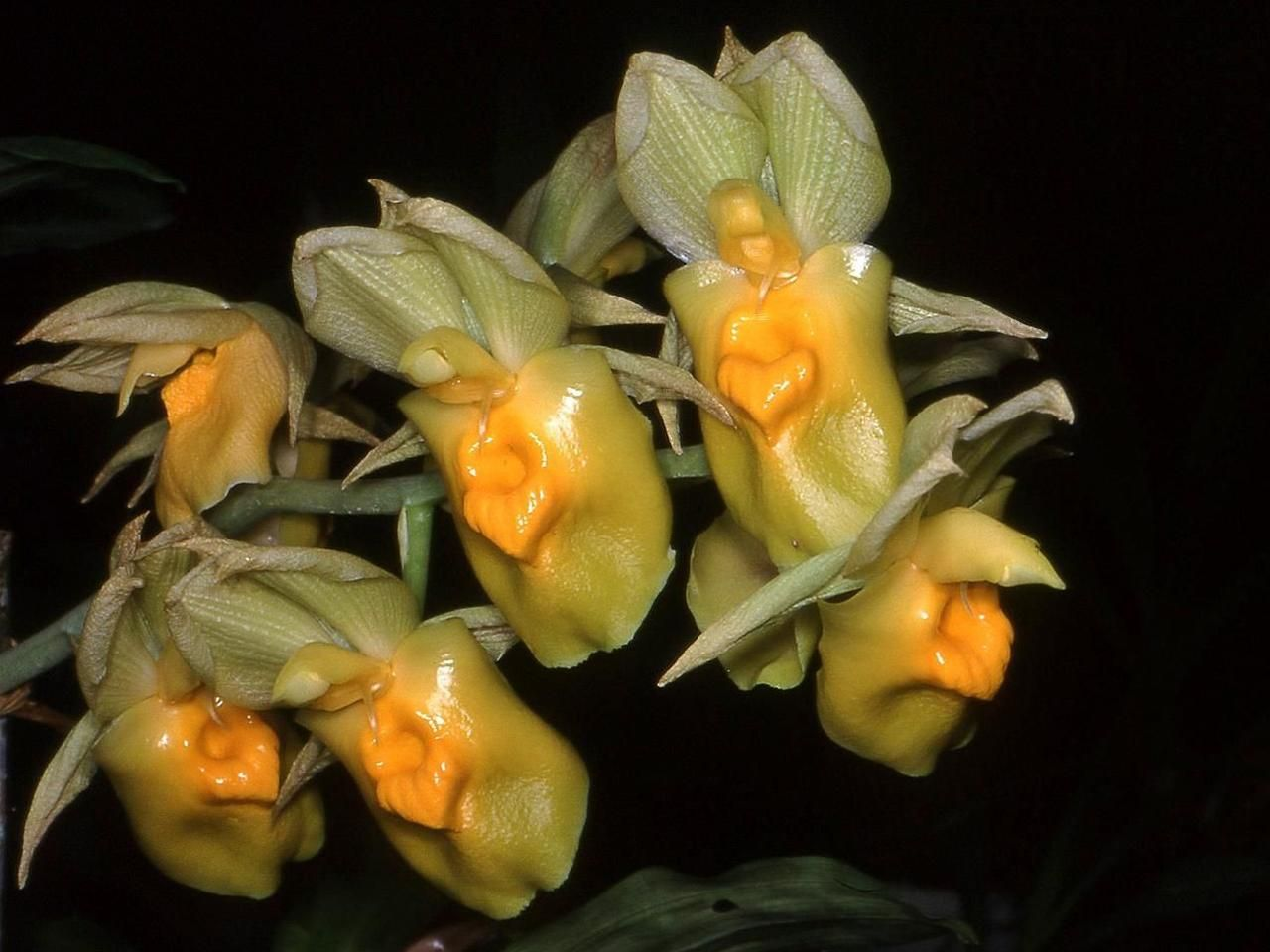
Catasetum expansum

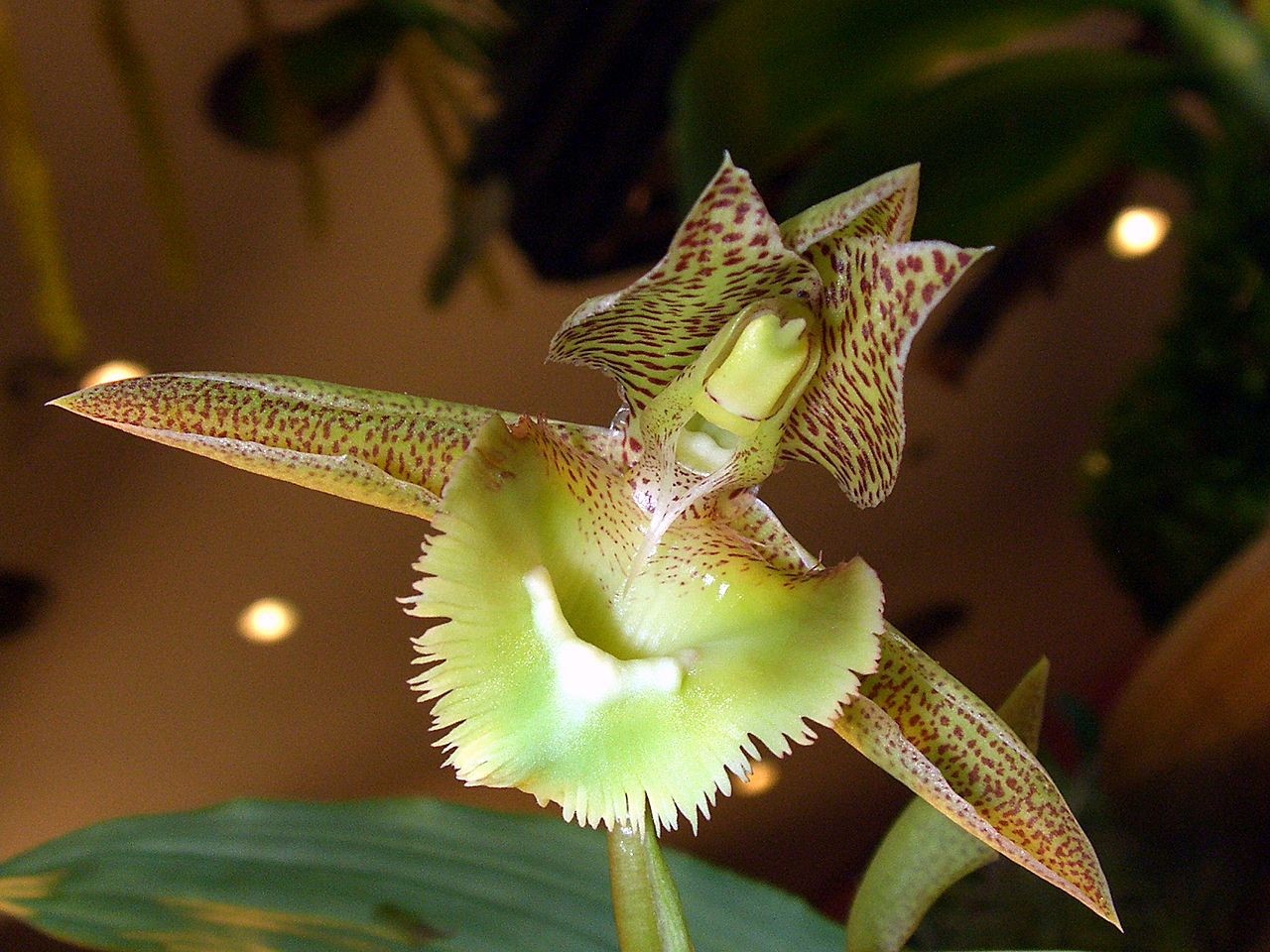
Catasetum fimbriatum

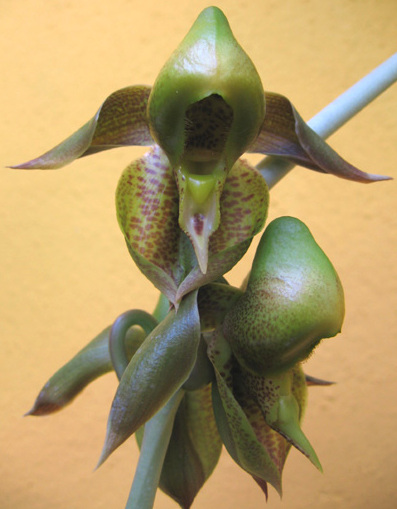
Catasetum maculatum

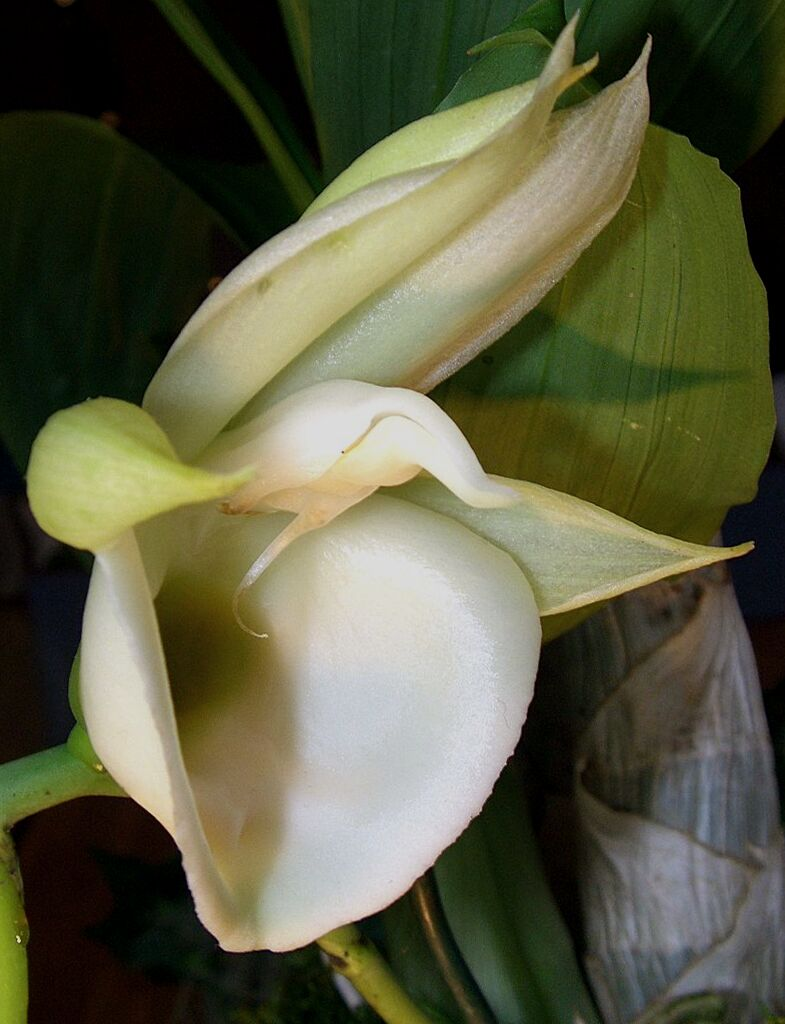
Catasetum pileatum

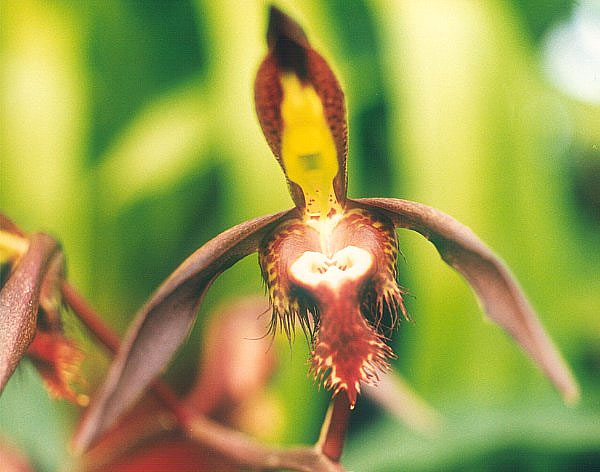
Catasetum saccatum

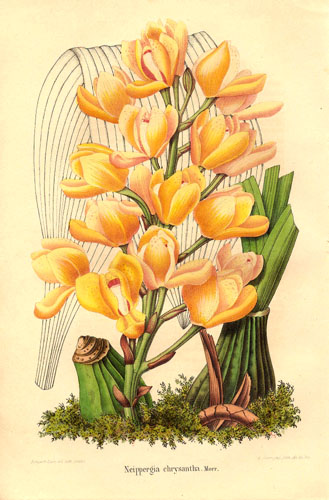
Acineta chrysantha

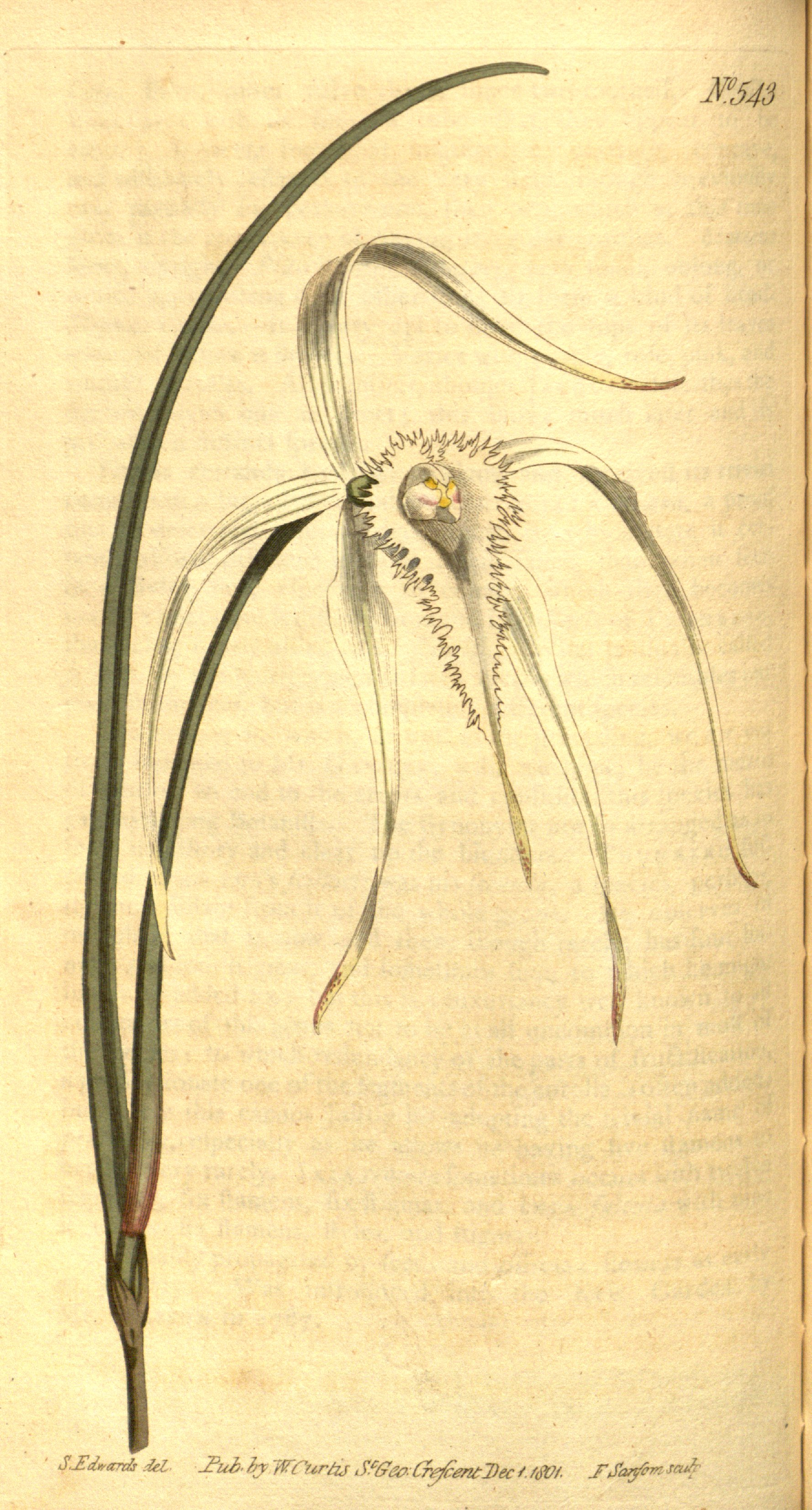
Brassavola cucullata

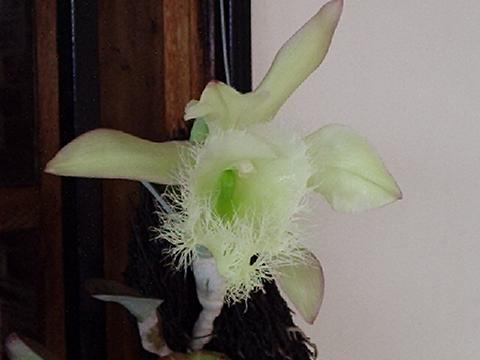
Brassavola digbyana

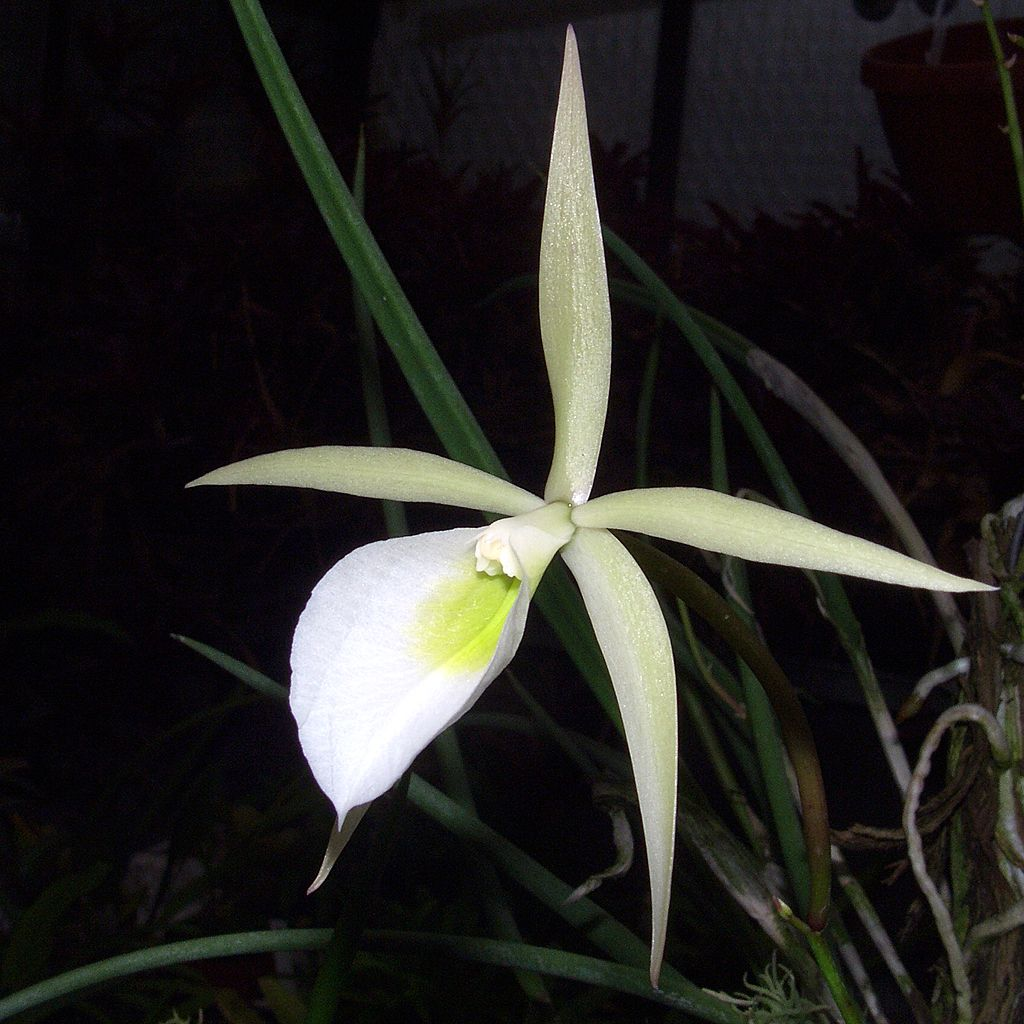
Brassavola flagellaris

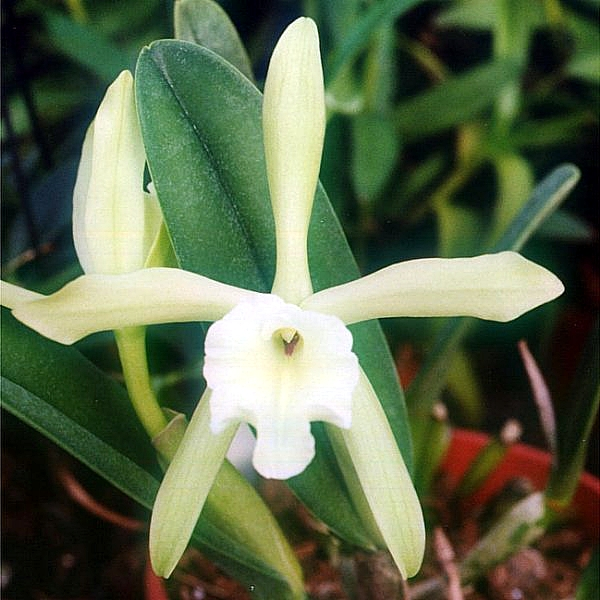
Brassavola glauca

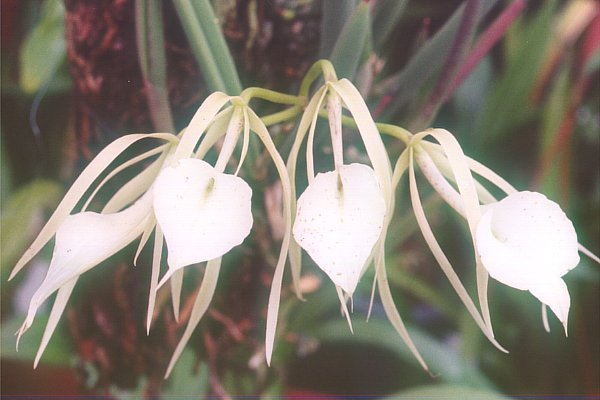
Brassavola nodosa

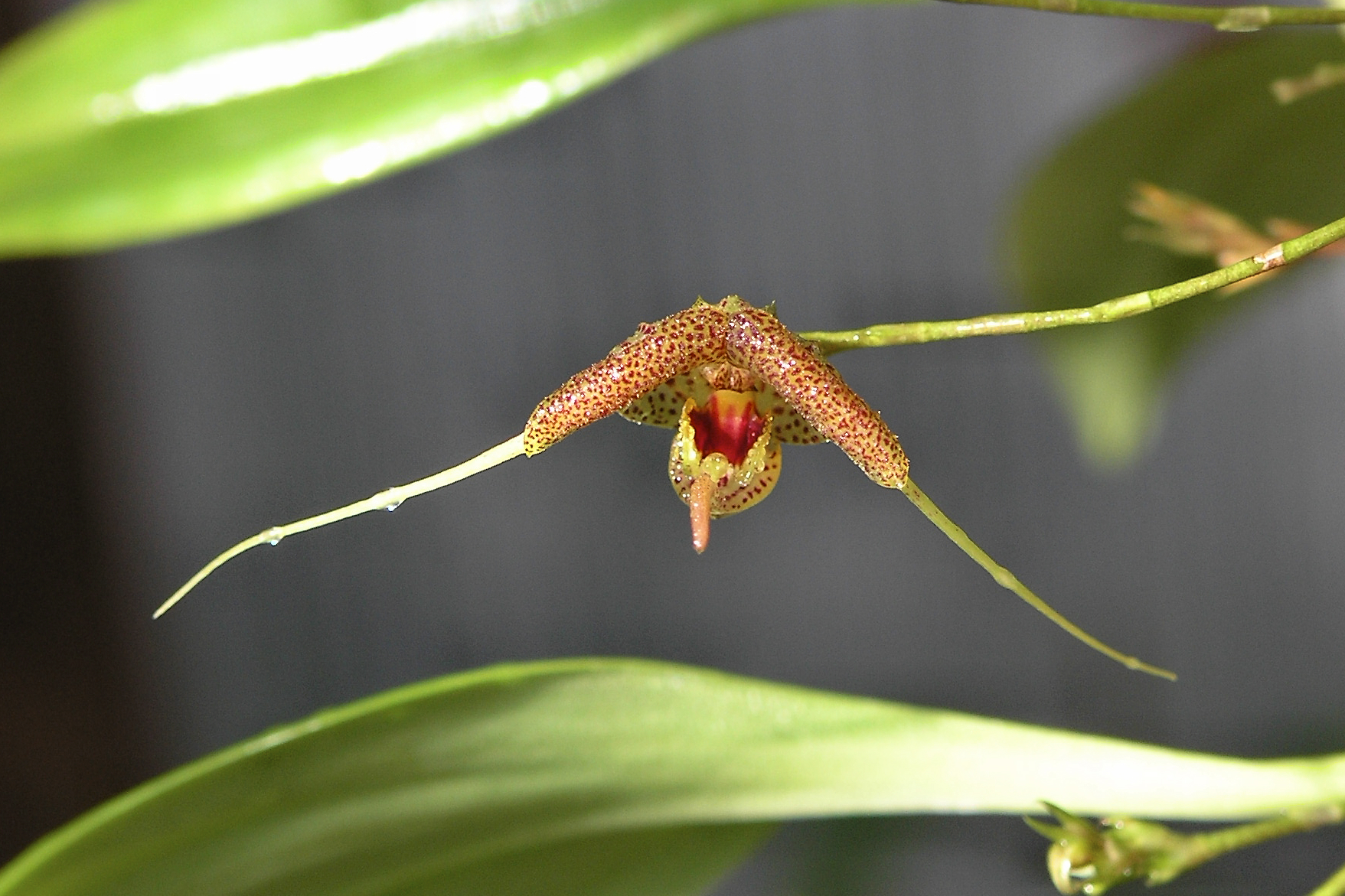
Scaphosepalum swertiifolium

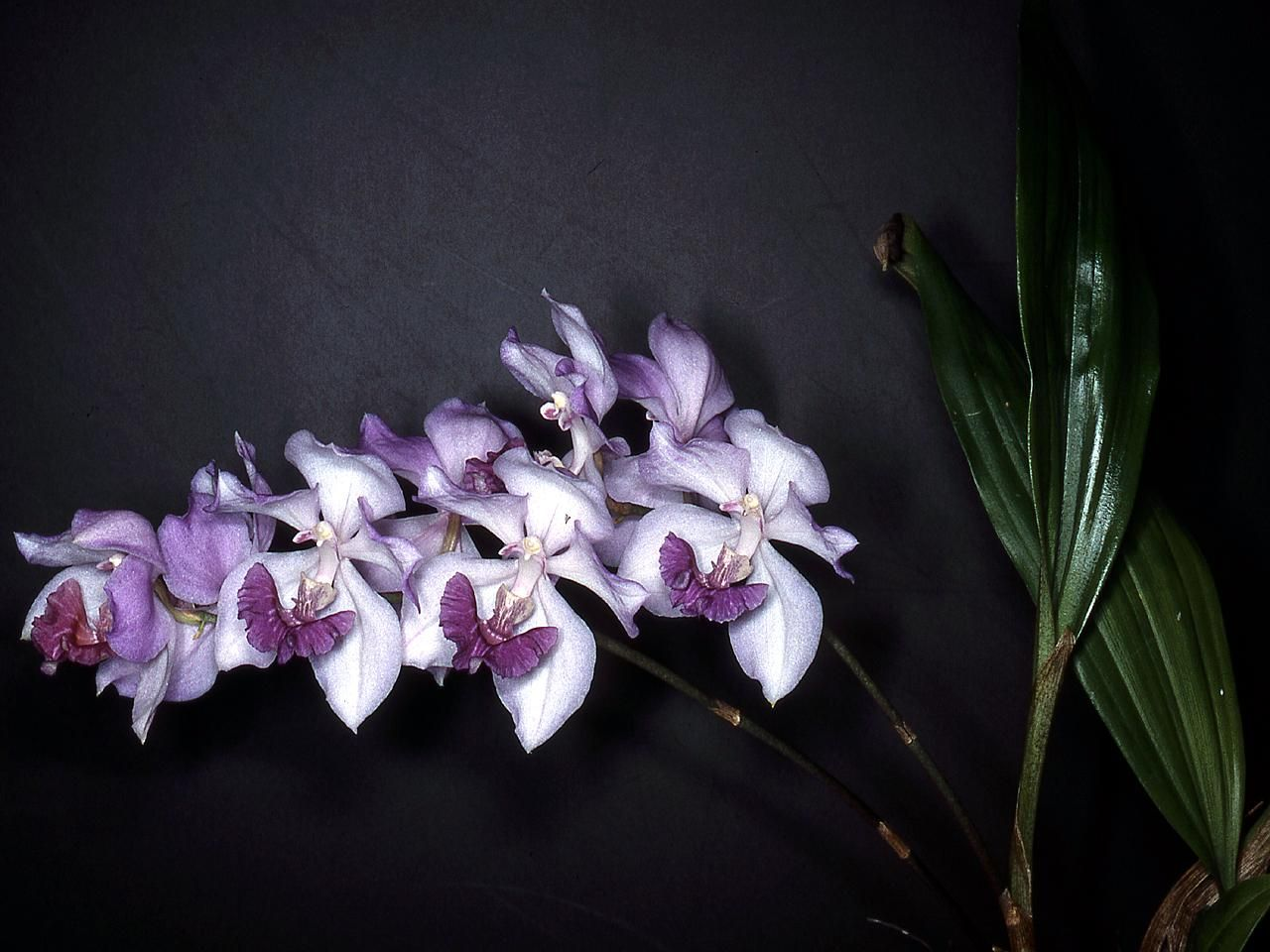
Aganisia cyanea

=== Frondaria ===
- Frondaria caulescens

=== Restrepia ===
- Restrepia antennifera
- Restrepia chocoensis
- Restrepia citrina
- Restrepia muscifera

== See also ==
- Fauna of Colombia
- List of national parks of Colombia
- Environmental issues in Colombia
