= Gongora (disambiguation) =

Gongora is a genus of orchids, named after Antonio Caballero y Góngora.

Gongora may also refer to:

- Luis de Góngora (1561-1627), Spanish poet frequently known as "Góngora"
- Góngora (surname)

== See also ==
- Gongora speciosa, former name of Coryanthes speciosa
- Gongora subg. Acropera, an orchid subgenus
