= Góngora (surname) =

Góngora is a Spanish surname of Navarran origin. People bearing the surname include:

- Alonso de Góngora Marmolejo (1523–1575), Spanish conquistador and chronicler in Chile
- Augusto Góngora (1952–2023), Chilean journalist, filmmaker, and television presenter
- Canek Vázquez Góngora (born 1979), Mexican politician
- Carlos Góngora (born 1989), Ecuadorian amateur boxer
- Efraín Aguilar Góngora (born 1964), Mexican politician
- Genaro David Góngora (born 1937), Mexican jurist and member of Mexico's Supreme Court of Justice
- Hornella Góngora, Spanish drag queen
- Jorge Góngora (1906–1999), Peruvian footballer
- Julián Angulo Góngora (born 1953), Mexican lawyer and politician
- Luis de Góngora (1561–1627), Spanish lyric poet of the Siglo de Oro
- Mario Góngora (1915–1985), Chilean historian
- Martín Góngora (born 1980), Uruguayan footballer
- Michael Góngora (born 1970), American politician
- Sandra Góngora (born 1985), Mexican ten-pin bowler

== Matronyms ==
- Margarita Penón Góngora (born 1948), Costa Rican politician
- Antonio Caballero y Góngora (1723–1796), Catholic prelate
- Fausto Cruzat y Góngora, governor-general of the Philippines
- Gervasio Cruzat y Góngora, governor of Nuevo Mexico
- Pedro Francisco de Luján y Góngora, 1st Duke of Almodóvar del Río (1727–1794)

== See also ==
- Gongora, orchid named after Antonio Caballero y Góngora
