= G. maculata =

G. maculata may refer to:

- Gaeana maculata, an Asian cicada
- Granata maculata, a sea snail
- Gandaritis maculata, a geometer moth
- Gasteria maculata, a succulent plant
- Geckolepis maculata, a Malagasy gecko
- Genetta maculata, an African mammal
- Genocidaris maculata, a sea urchin
- Gilia maculata, a phlox endemic to California
- Gliricidia maculata, an ornamental tree
- Gloxinia maculata, a herbaceous plant
- Glycymeris maculata, a saltwater clam
- Glyphipterix maculata, a sedge moth
- Gongora maculata, a New World orchid
- Gorgasia maculata, a garden eel
- Granata maculata, a sea snail
- Graphomya maculata, a European fly
