= G. armeniaca =

G. armeniaca may refer to:

- Gongora armeniaca, an orchid species
- Grifola armeniaca, a fungus species in the genus Grifola

== See also ==
- Armeniaca (disambiguation)
