= Aceras =

Aceras may refer to:

== Animals ==
- Xenophrys aceras, a species of amphibian

== Orchids ==
- Aceras, a genus of orchid
- Gongora aceras, a species of orchid
- Aceras anthropophorum, a species of orchid
- Aceras caprinum, a species of orchid
- Aceras fragrans, a species of orchid
