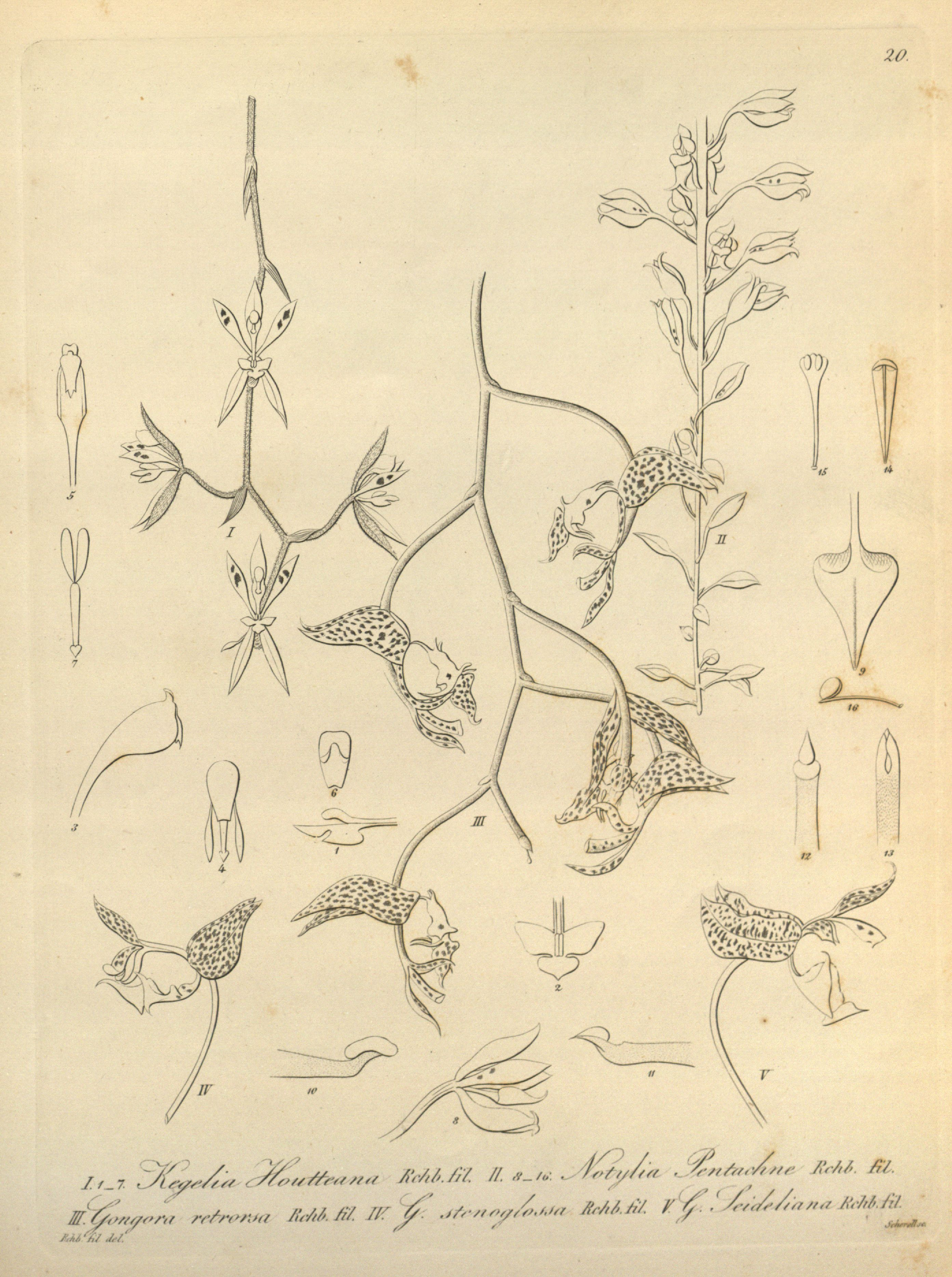

Scientific classification
- Kingdom: Plantae
- Clade: Tracheophytes
- Clade: Angiosperms
- Clade: Monocots
- Order: Asparagales
- Family: Orchidaceae
- Subfamily: Epidendroideae
- Genus: Gongora
- Species: G. seideliana

Binomial name
- Gongora seideliana Rchb.f.

= Gongora seideliana =

Species of orchid

Gongora seideliana is a species of orchid found in Mexico (Chiapas). It was described in 1852 by Ludwig Reichenbach and is very similar to G. truncata. According to Rudolf Jenny, Reichenbach erroneously named the same plant twice, so G. saccata is a synonym.
