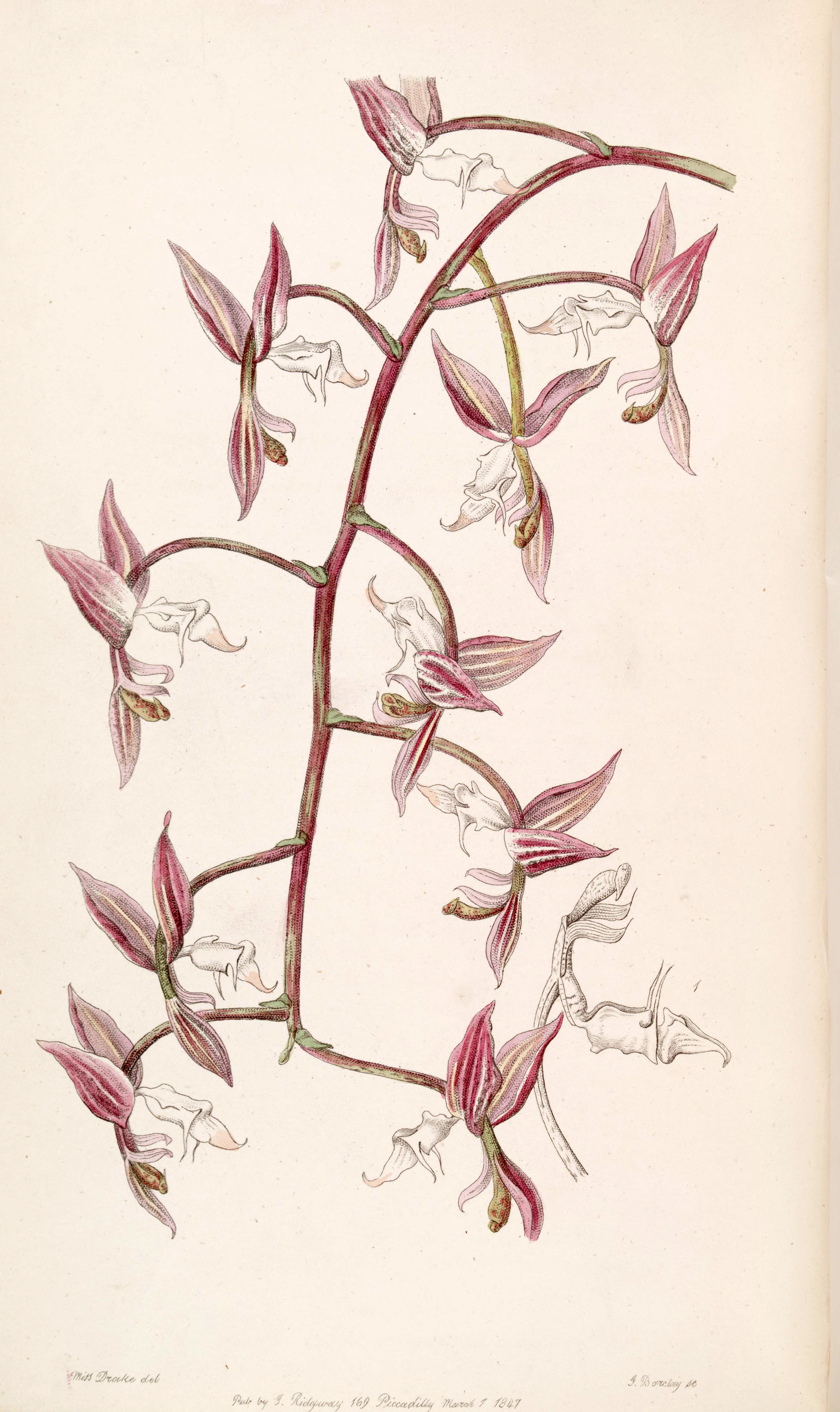

Scientific classification
- Kingdom: Plantae
- Clade: Tracheophytes
- Clade: Angiosperms
- Clade: Monocots
- Order: Asparagales
- Family: Orchidaceae
- Subfamily: Epidendroideae
- Genus: Gongora
- Species: G. aromatica

Binomial name
- Gongora aromatica Rchb.f

Synonyms
- Gongora bufonia var. leucochila Lindl.; Gongora maculata var. leucochila (Lindl.) C.Schweinf.

= Gongora aromatica =

Species of orchid

Gongora aromatica is a species of orchid native to Bolivia, Guatemala, Nicaragua.
