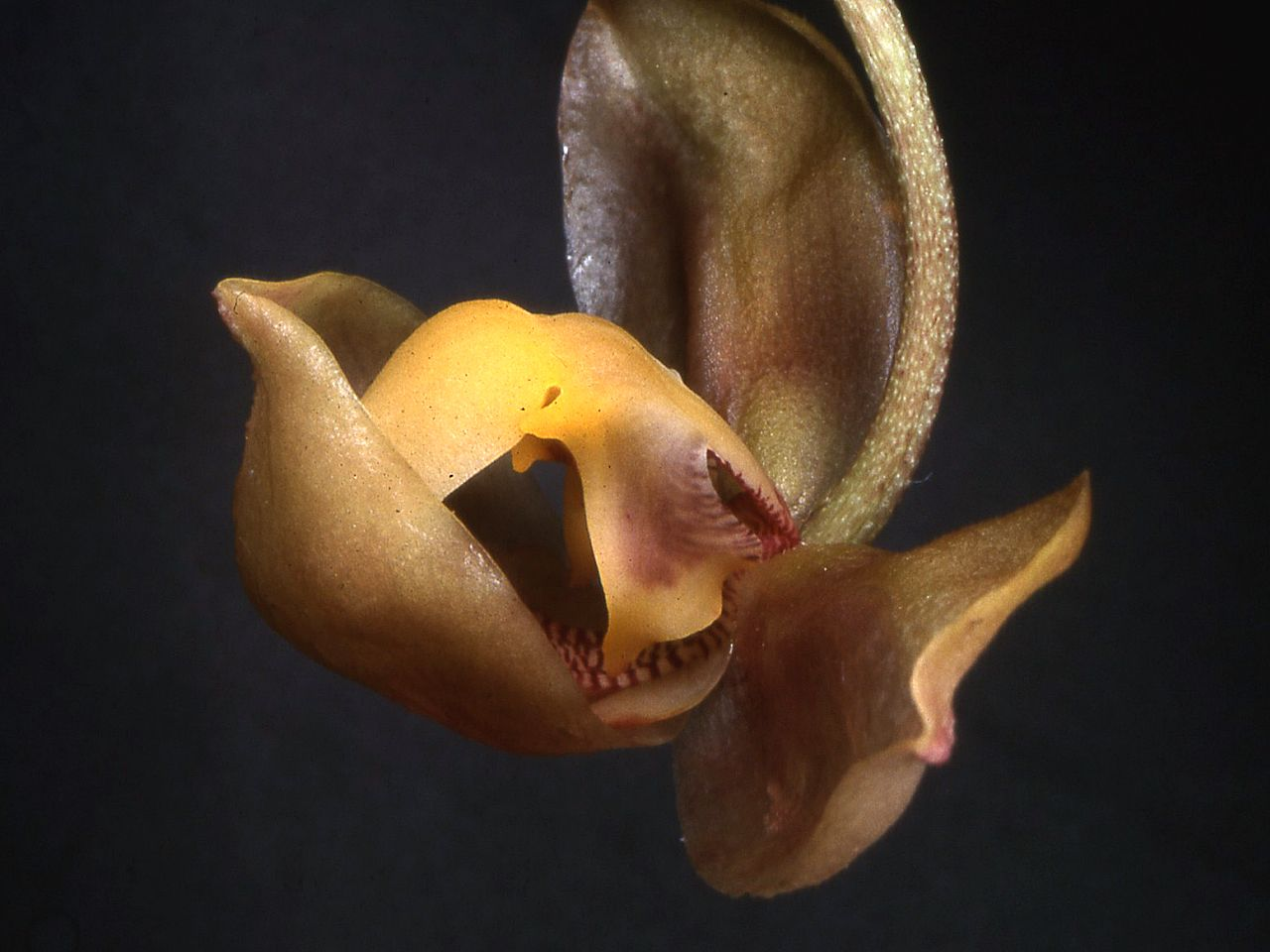

Scientific classification
- Kingdom: Plantae
- Clade: Tracheophytes
- Clade: Angiosperms
- Clade: Monocots
- Order: Asparagales
- Family: Orchidaceae
- Subfamily: Epidendroideae
- Genus: Gongora
- Species: G. cassidea

Binomial name
- Gongora cassidea Rchb.f.

Synonyms
- Gongora batemanii Henshall; Acropera batemannii Lindl. ex Rchb.f.

= Gongora cassidea =

Species of orchid

Gongora cassidea is a species of orchid found in Mexico, Belize, Guatemala, El Salvador, Honduras, Nicaragua and Costa Rica.
