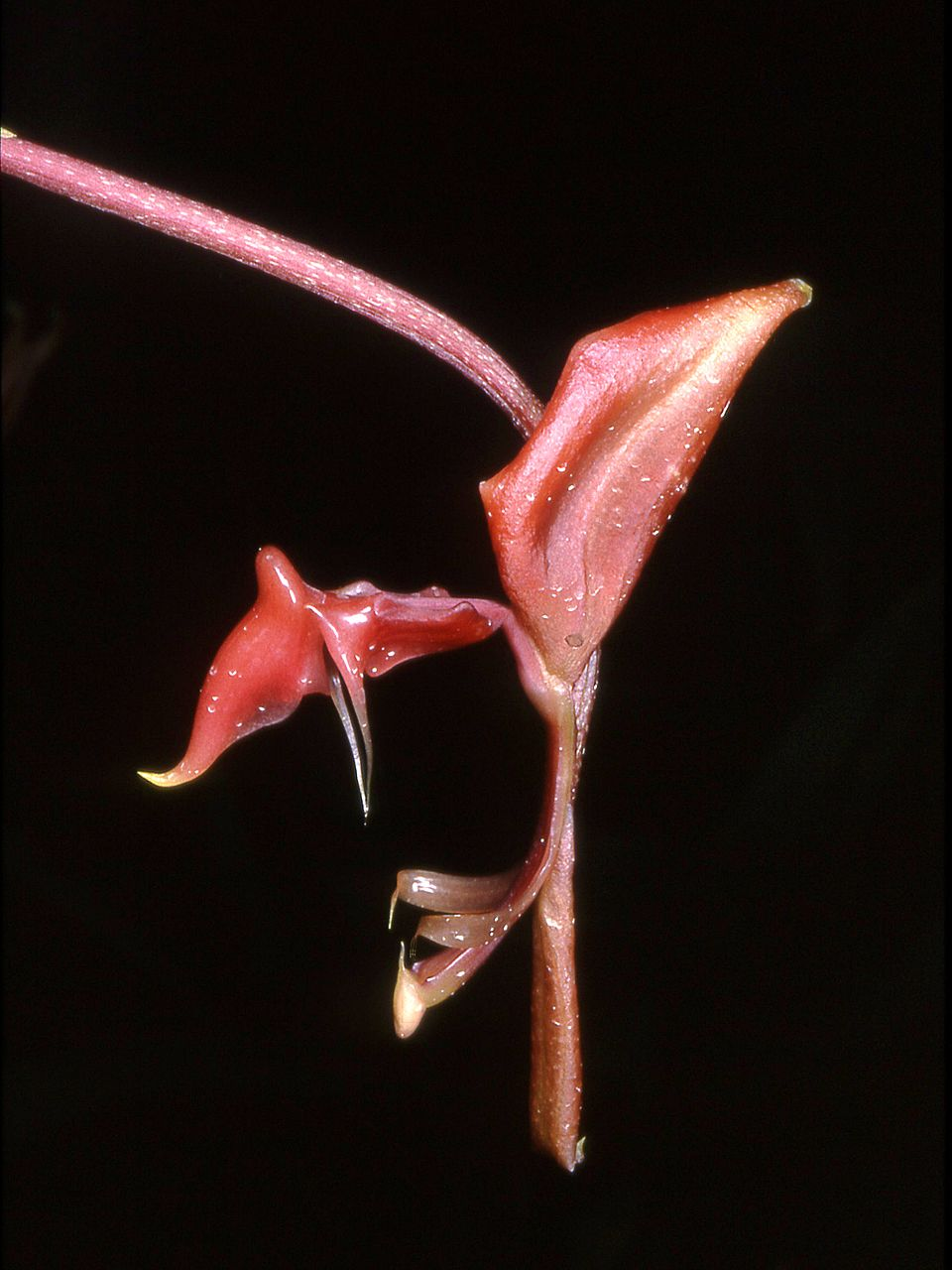

Scientific classification
- Kingdom: Plantae
- Clade: Tracheophytes
- Clade: Angiosperms
- Clade: Monocots
- Order: Asparagales
- Family: Orchidaceae
- Subfamily: Epidendroideae
- Genus: Gongora
- Species: G. ilense

Binomial name
- Gongora ilense Whitten & Jenny

= Gongora ilense =

Species of orchid

Gongora ilense is a species of orchid found in Ecuador.
