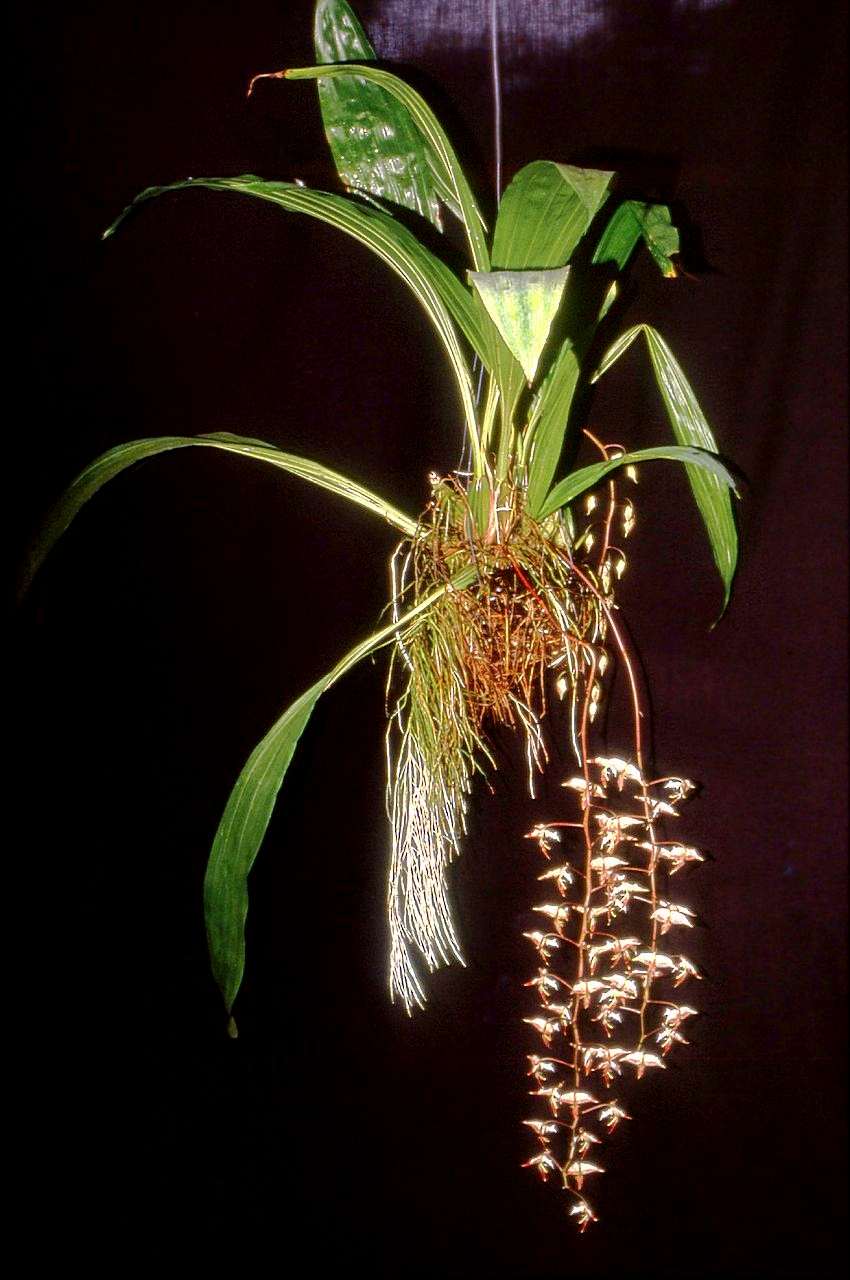

Scientific classification
- Kingdom: Plantae
- Clade: Tracheophytes
- Clade: Angiosperms
- Clade: Monocots
- Order: Asparagales
- Family: Orchidaceae
- Subfamily: Epidendroideae
- Genus: Gongora
- Species: G. irmgardiae

Binomial name
- Gongora irmgardiae Jenny

= Gongora irmgardiae =

Species of orchid

Gongora irmgardiae is a species of orchid found in Colombia.
