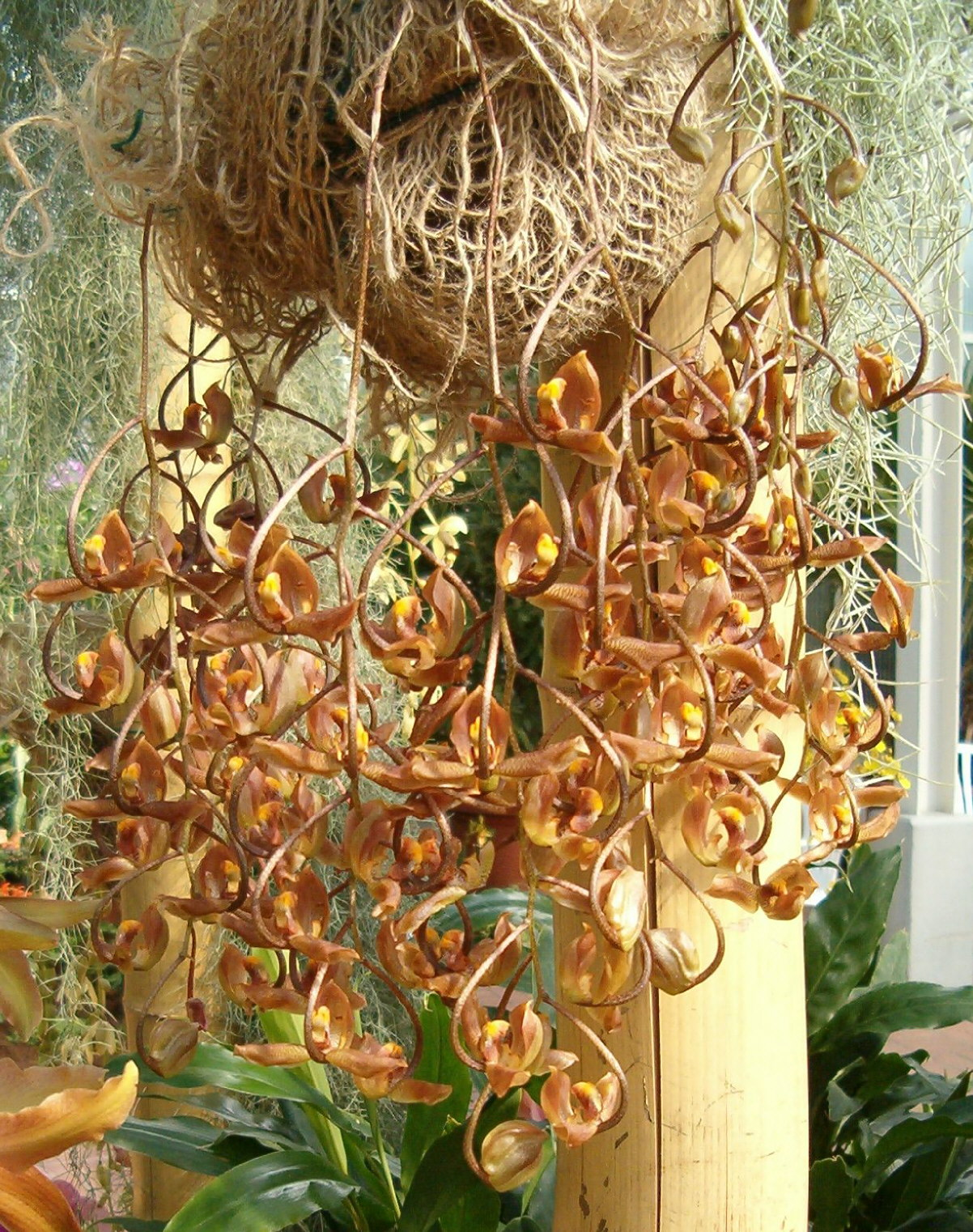

Scientific classification
- Kingdom: Plantae
- Clade: Tracheophytes
- Clade: Angiosperms
- Clade: Monocots
- Order: Asparagales
- Family: Orchidaceae
- Subfamily: Epidendroideae
- Genus: Gongora
- Species: G. galeata

Binomial name
- Gongora galeata (Lindl.) Rchb.f.

Synonyms
- Maxillaria galeata Lindl. (basionym)

= Gongora galeata =

Species of orchid

Gongora galeata is a species of orchid found in Mexico and possibly Guatemala.
