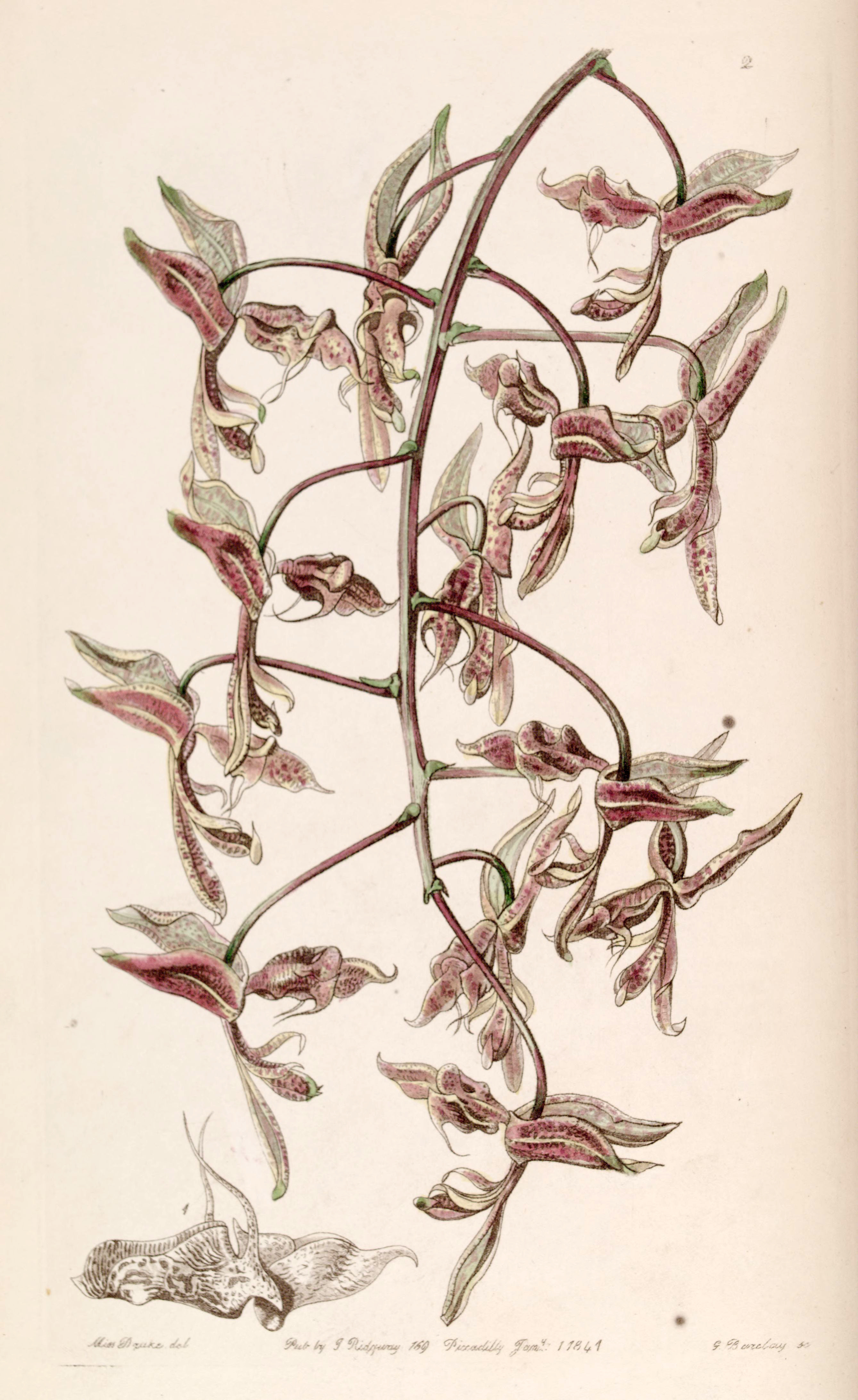

Scientific classification
- Kingdom: Plantae
- Clade: Tracheophytes
- Clade: Angiosperms
- Clade: Monocots
- Order: Asparagales
- Family: Orchidaceae
- Subfamily: Epidendroideae
- Genus: Gongora
- Species: G. bufonia

Binomial name
- Gongora bufonia Lindl.

Synonyms
- Gongora irrorata Hoffmanns.; Gongora maculata var. bufonia (Lindl.) C.Schweinf.

= Gongora bufonia =

Species of orchid

Gongora bufonia is a species of orchid found in tropical rainforests in southern and southeastern Brazil.
