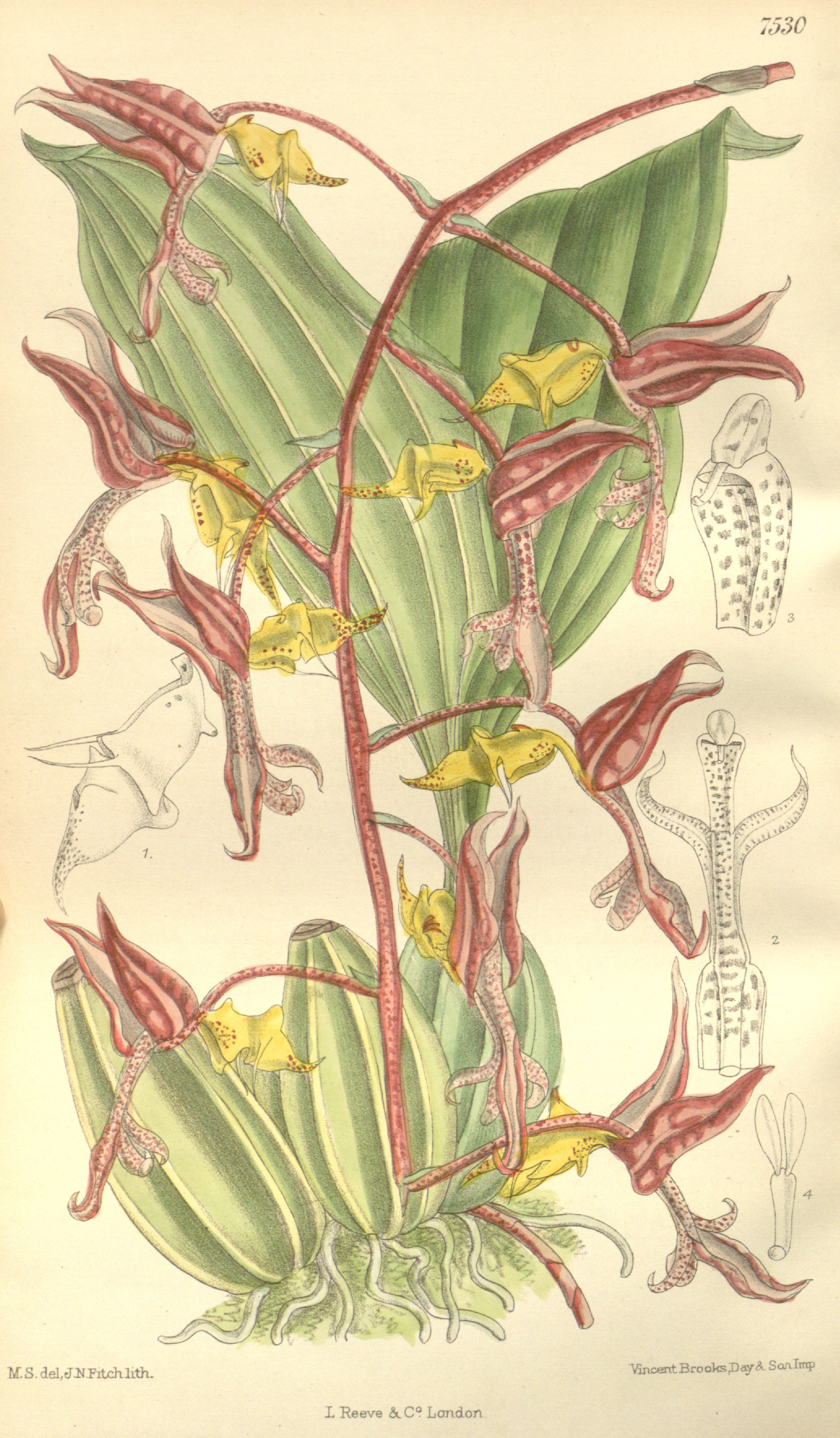

Scientific classification
- Kingdom: Plantae
- Clade: Tracheophytes
- Clade: Angiosperms
- Clade: Monocots
- Order: Asparagales
- Family: Orchidaceae
- Subfamily: Epidendroideae
- Genus: Gongora
- Species: G. fulva

Binomial name
- Gongora fulva Lindl.

Synonyms
- Gongora tricolor Rchb.f.

= Gongora fulva =

Species of orchid

Gongora fulva is a species of orchid found in Colombia.
