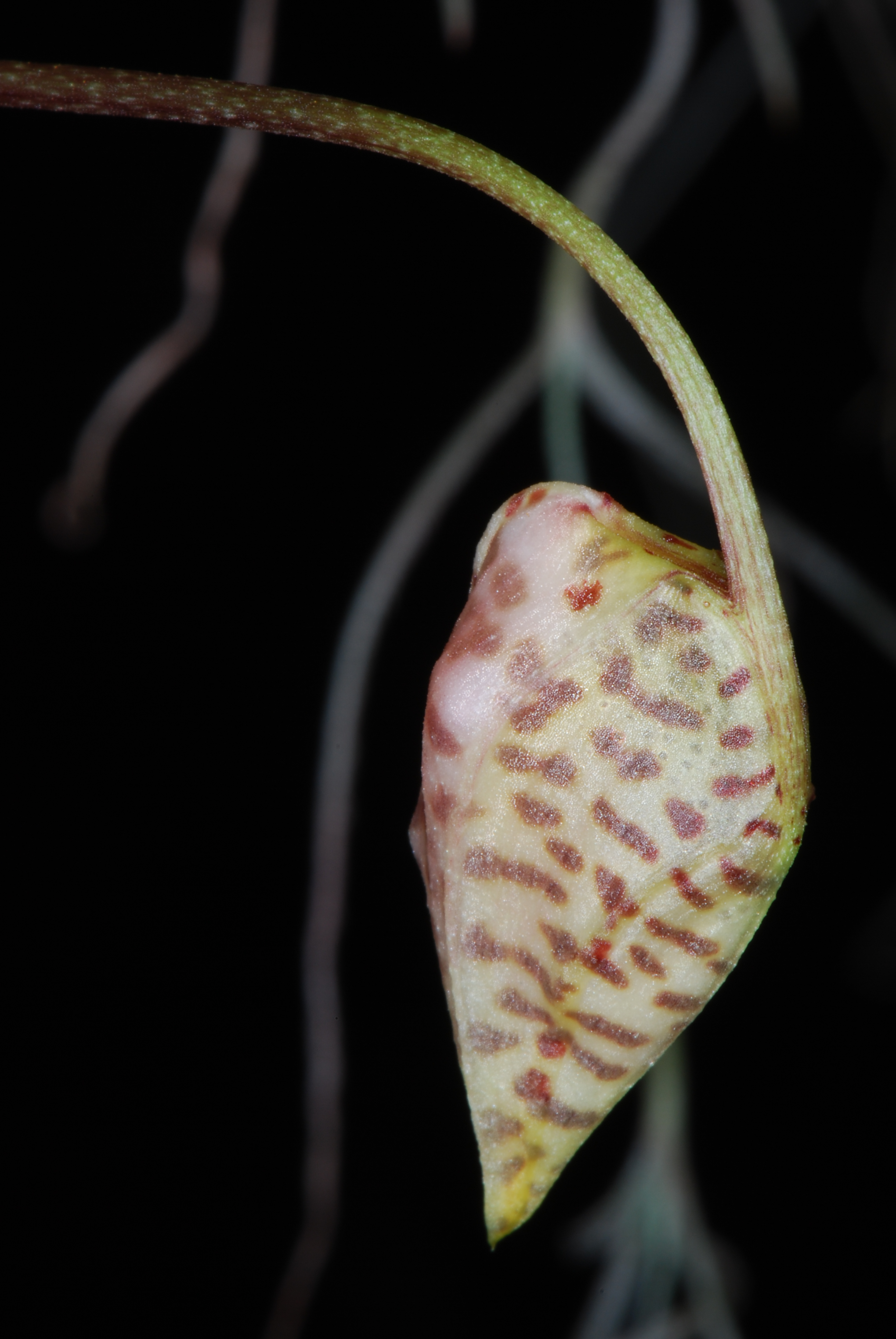

Scientific classification
- Kingdom: Plantae
- Clade: Tracheophytes
- Clade: Angiosperms
- Clade: Monocots
- Order: Asparagales
- Family: Orchidaceae
- Subfamily: Epidendroideae
- Genus: Gongora
- Species: G. quinquenervis

Binomial name
- Gongora quinquenervis Ruiz & Pav.

Synonyms
- Cirrhaea atropurpurea Hoffmanns.

= Gongora quinquenervis =

Species of orchid

Gongora quinquenervis is a species of orchid, and the type species of the genus Gongora. This species forms a complex for several ill-defined species. It is found in Brazil, Colombia, Ecuador and Peru.

== Description ==
Gongora quinquenervis is a pseudobulbous epiphyte.
