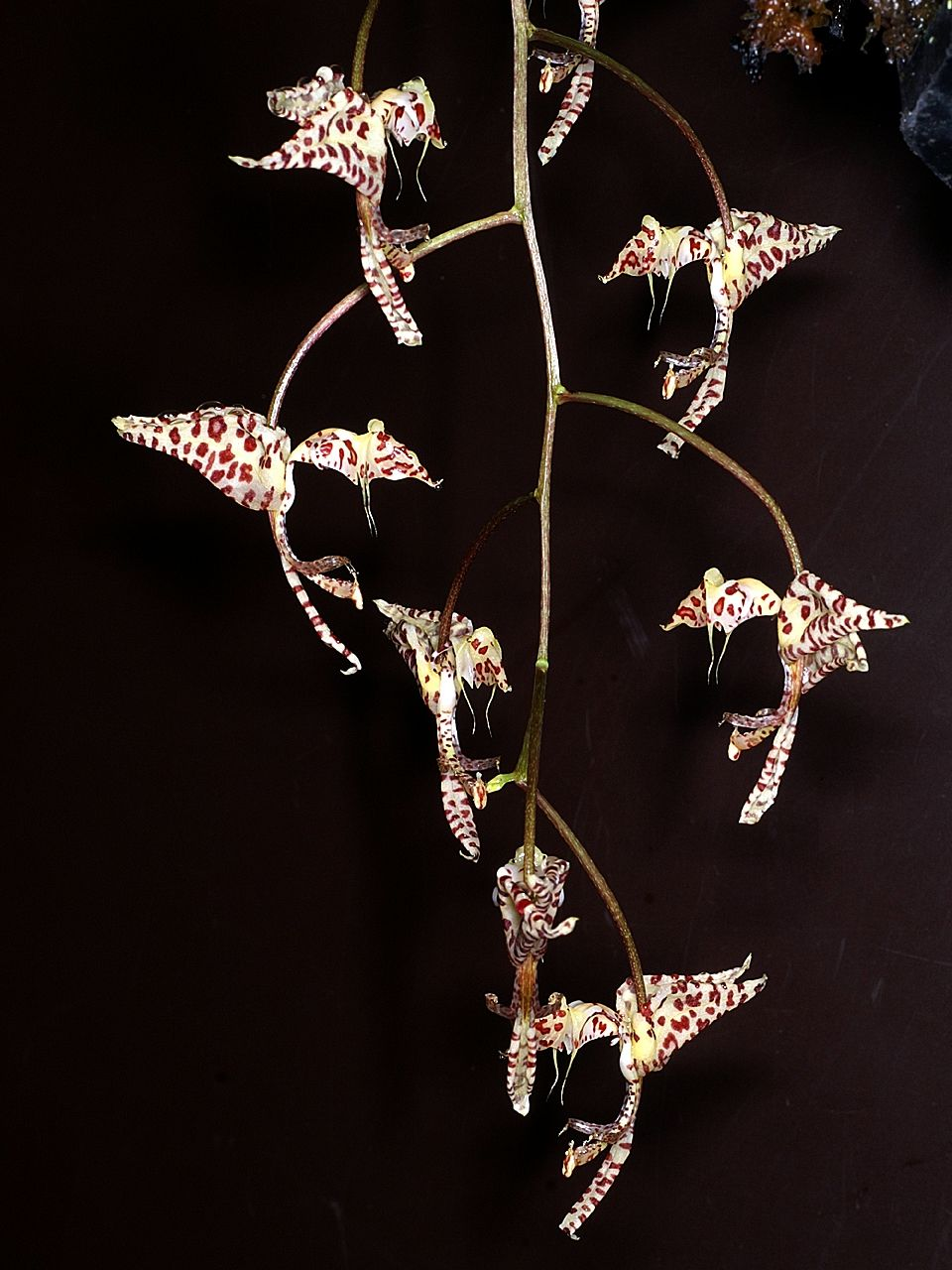

Scientific classification
- Kingdom: Plantae
- Clade: Tracheophytes
- Clade: Angiosperms
- Clade: Monocots
- Order: Asparagales
- Family: Orchidaceae
- Subfamily: Epidendroideae
- Genus: Gongora
- Species: G. arcuata

Binomial name
- Gongora arcuata G. Gerlach & Toulem.

= Gongora arcuata =

Species of orchid

Gongora arcuata is a species of orchid found in Colombia.
