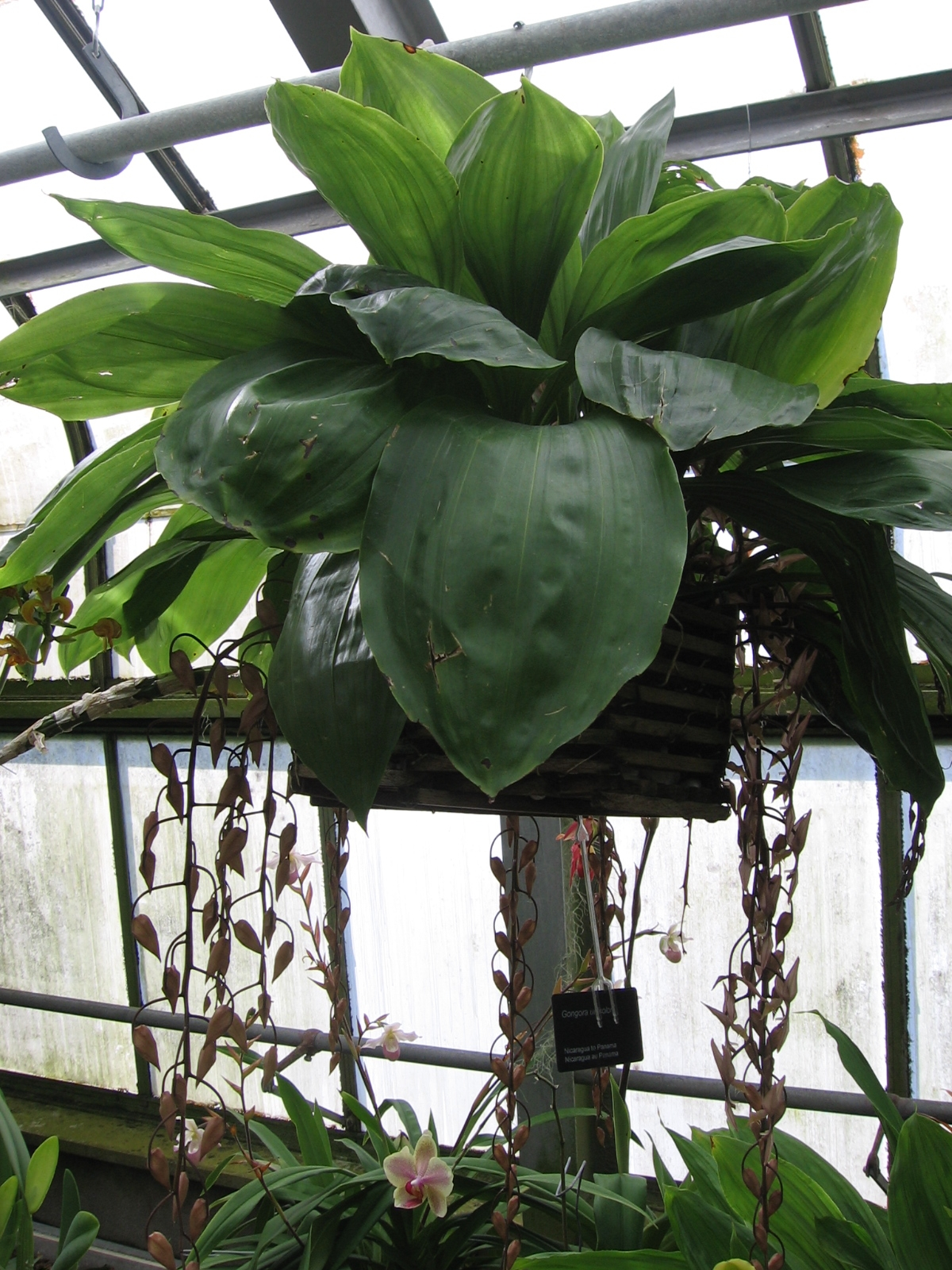
- Gongora unicolor habitus

Scientific classification
- Kingdom: Plantae
- Clade: Tracheophytes
- Clade: Angiosperms
- Clade: Monocots
- Order: Asparagales
- Family: Orchidaceae
- Subfamily: Epidendroideae
- Genus: Gongora
- Species: G. unicolor

Binomial name
- Gongora unicolor Schltr.

= Gongora unicolor =

Species of orchid

Gongora unicolor is a species of plant in the family Orchidaceae. This species is a pseudobulbous epiphyte and has a pale-flesh colored flower that is pollinated by Euglossa purpurea. It can be found from Costa Rica to southern Mexico in wet and tropical biomes.

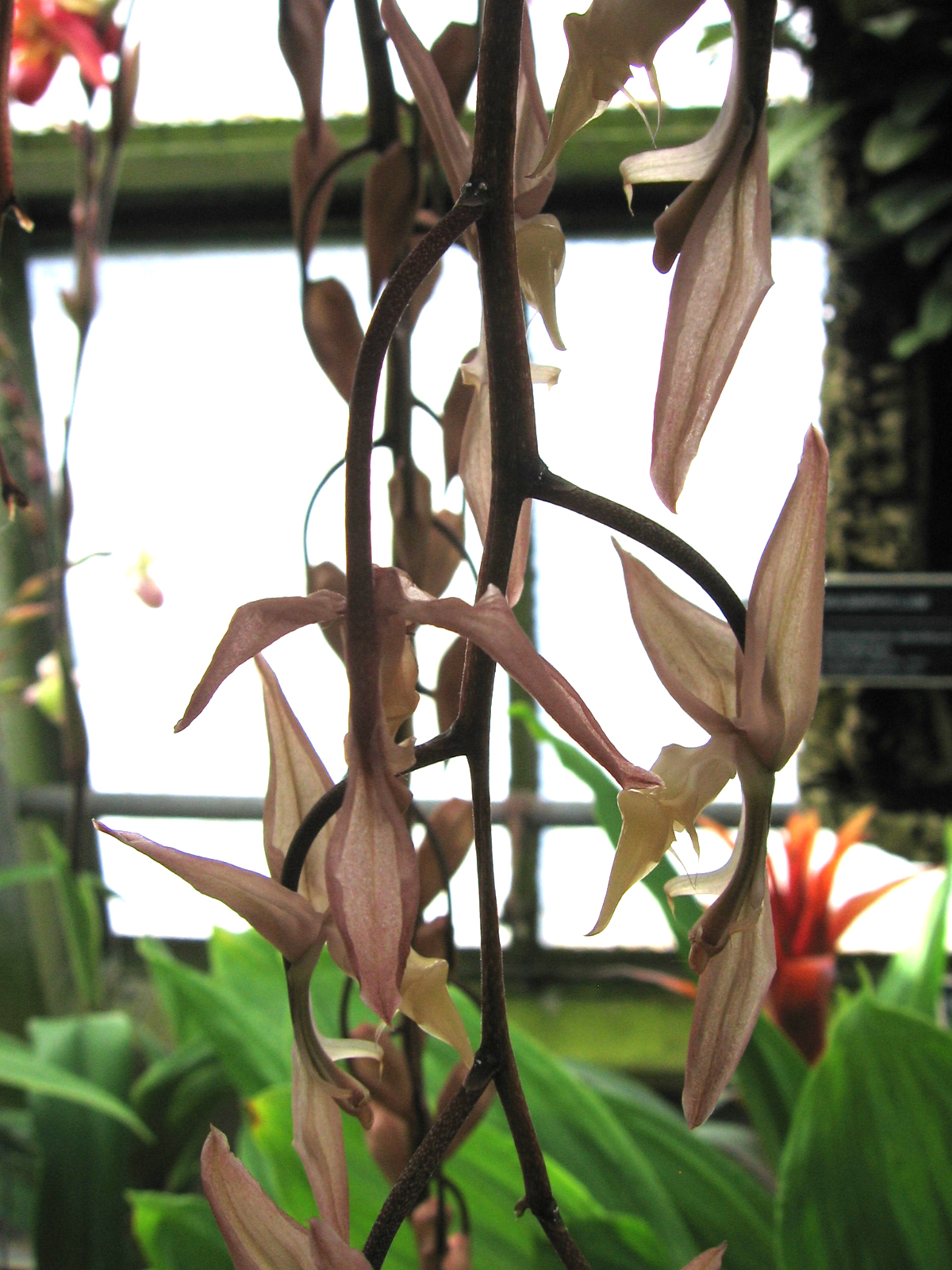
Flowers

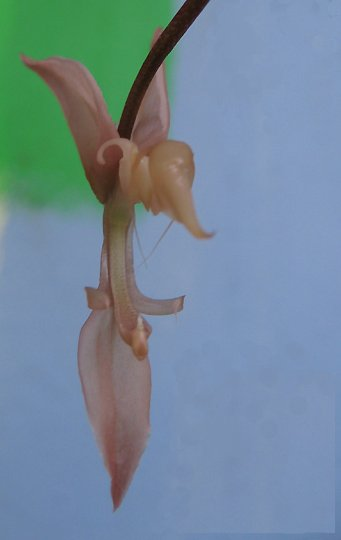
Flower
