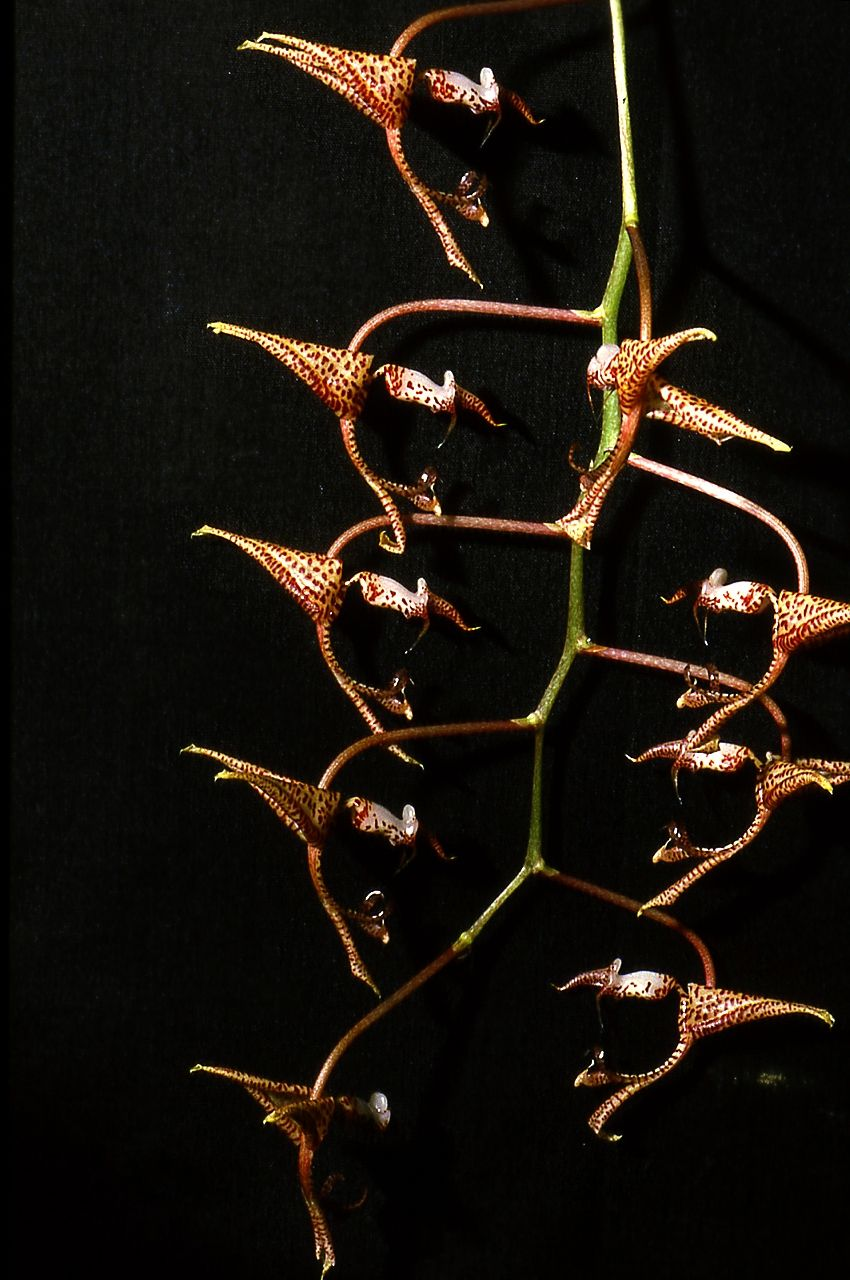

Scientific classification
- Kingdom: Plantae
- Clade: Tracheophytes
- Clade: Angiosperms
- Clade: Monocots
- Order: Asparagales
- Family: Orchidaceae
- Subfamily: Epidendroideae
- Genus: Gongora
- Species: G. aceras

Binomial name
- Gongora aceras Dressler

Synonyms
- Gongora napoensis Jenny

= Gongora aceras =

Species of orchid

Gongora aceras is a species of orchid found in Colombia and western Ecuador.
