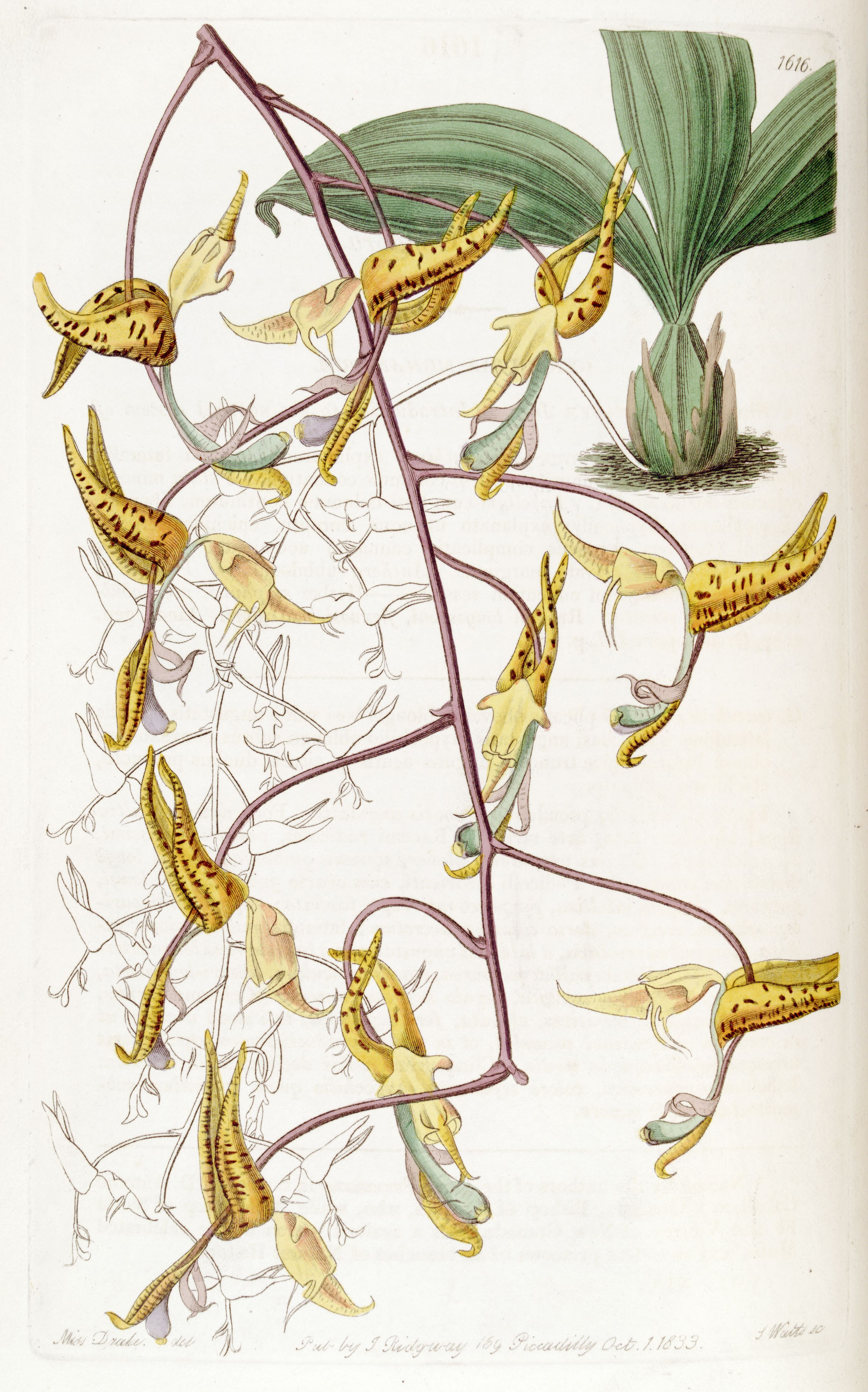

Scientific classification
- Kingdom: Plantae
- Clade: Tracheophytes
- Clade: Angiosperms
- Clade: Monocots
- Order: Asparagales
- Family: Orchidaceae
- Subfamily: Epidendroideae
- Genus: Gongora
- Species: G. maculata

Binomial name
- Gongora maculata Lindl.

Synonyms
- Gongora maculata var. hookeri Klotzsch & H.Karst.

= Gongora maculata =

Species of orchid

Gongora maculata is a species of orchid found in Colombia, Guyana, Peru, Trinidad and Tobago, Venezuela.
