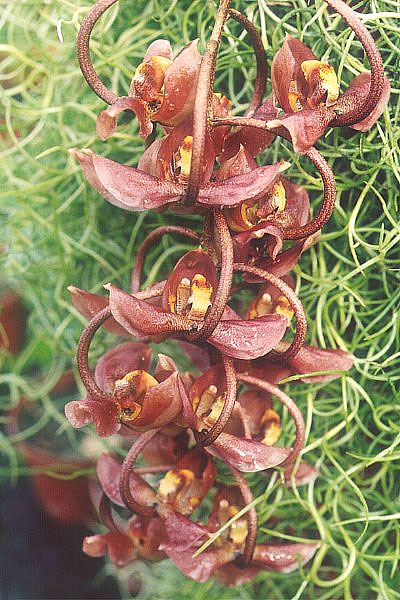

Scientific classification
- Kingdom: Plantae
- Clade: Tracheophytes
- Clade: Angiosperms
- Clade: Monocots
- Order: Asparagales
- Family: Orchidaceae
- Subfamily: Epidendroideae
- Genus: Gongora
- Species: G. armeniaca

Binomial name
- Gongora armeniaca (Lindl.) Rchb.f

Synonyms
- Acropera armeniaca Lindl. & Paxton; Acropera cornuta Klotzsch; Gongora cornuta (Klotzsch) Fowlie & Jenny; Gongora armeriaca ssp. cornuta (Klotzsch) Whitten

= Gongora armeniaca =

Species of orchid

Gongora armeniaca is a species of orchid found in Costa Rica, Panama and Nicaragua.
