= Gongora subg. Acropera =

Scientific classification
- Kingdom: Plantae
- Clade: Tracheophytes
- Clade: Angiosperms
- Clade: Monocots
- Order: Asparagales
- Family: Orchidaceae
- Subfamily: Epidendroideae
- Genus: Gongora
- Subgenus: Gongora subg. Acropera

Species
- See text

Subgenus of orchids

Gongora subg. Acropera is a subgenus of Gongora, containing seven species.
