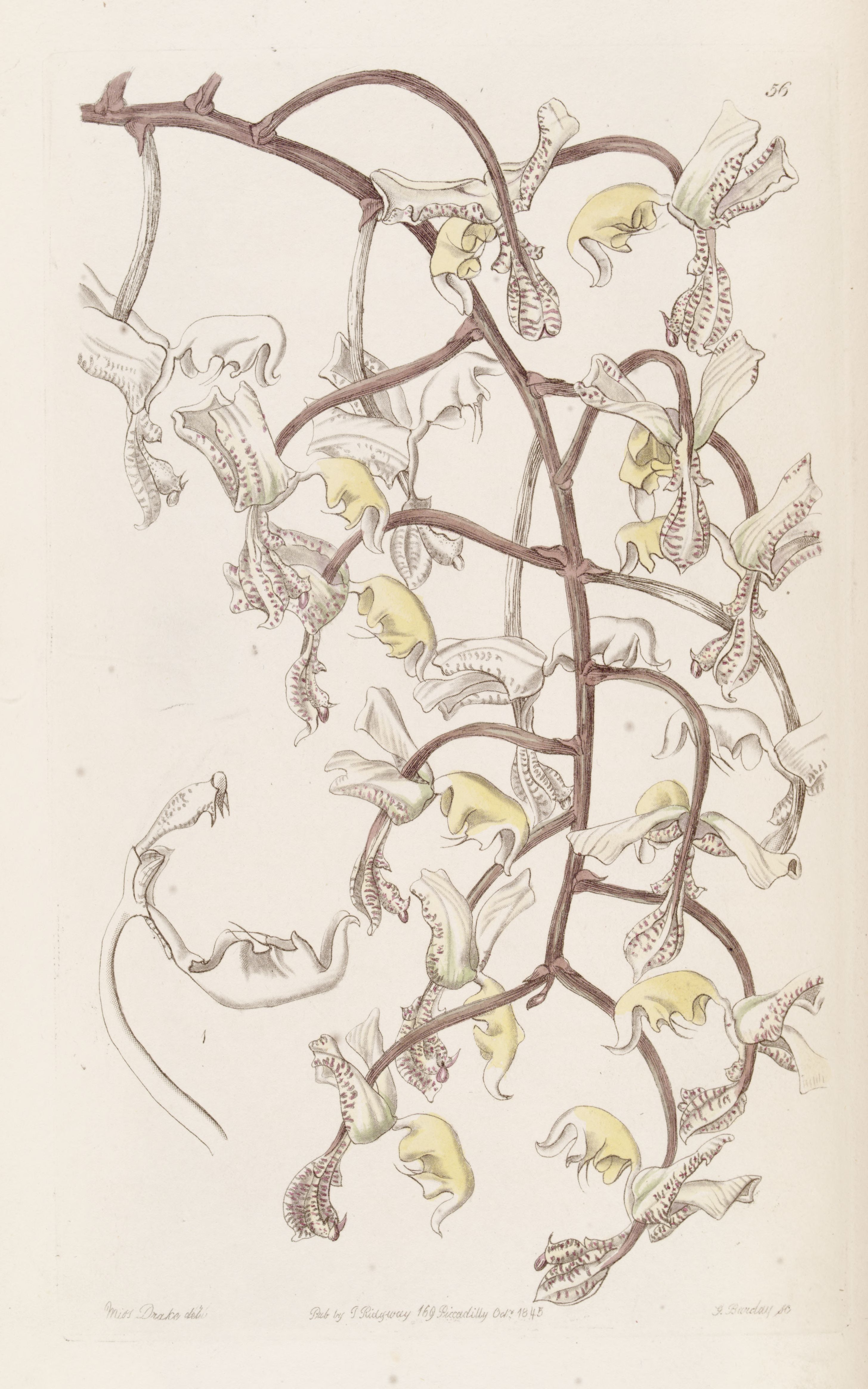

Scientific classification
- Kingdom: Plantae
- Clade: Tracheophytes
- Clade: Angiosperms
- Clade: Monocots
- Order: Asparagales
- Family: Orchidaceae
- Subfamily: Epidendroideae
- Genus: Gongora
- Species: G. truncata

Binomial name
- Gongora truncata Lindl.

Synonyms
- Gongora truncata var. donckelaariana Lem.; Gongora donckelaariana (Lem.) Rchb.f.

= Gongora truncata =

Species of orchid

Gongora truncata is a species of orchid found in Mexico, Belize and Guatemala.
