= Martín Góngora =

Uruguayan footballer (born 1980)

Personal information
- Full name: Martín Andrés Góngora Milán
- Date of birth: June 27, 1980 (age 46)
- Place of birth: Paysandú, Uruguay
- Height: 1.90 m (6 ft 3 in)
- Position: Goalkeeper

Team information
- Current team: Gimnasia Concepcion
- Number: 1

Senior career*
Years	Team	Apps	(Gls)
2000–2005	Bella Vista		
2006	Guaraní		
2006–2007	Danubio		
2007–2008	Miramar Misiones	13	(0)
2008–2009	Juventud de Las Piedras	24	(0)
2009–2010	Racing de Montevideo	7	(0)
2010–2011	El Tanque Sisley	28	(0)
2012	Pelotas	6	(0)
2012–2013	Miramar Misiones	34	(0)
2013	Juventud de Las Piedras	15	(0)
2014	Mitre	17	(0)
2015–	Gimnasia Concepcion	10	(0)

International career
1999	Uruguay U-23	4	(0)
- * Club domestic league appearances and goals as of 4 July 2015

Martín Andrés Góngora Milán (born June 27, 1980) is an Uruguayan footballer currently playing for Gimnasia Concepcion in the Torneo Argentino A.

== CLub career ==
On 16 December 2011, he signed a contract with Brazilian side Esporte Clube Pelotas to play the Campeonato Gaúcho.

== International career ==
In 1999, he was called by Luis Matosas to participate in the Uruguay U-23 squad for the 1999 Pan American Games in Canada.
