= Canek Vázquez Góngora =

Mexican politician (born 1979)

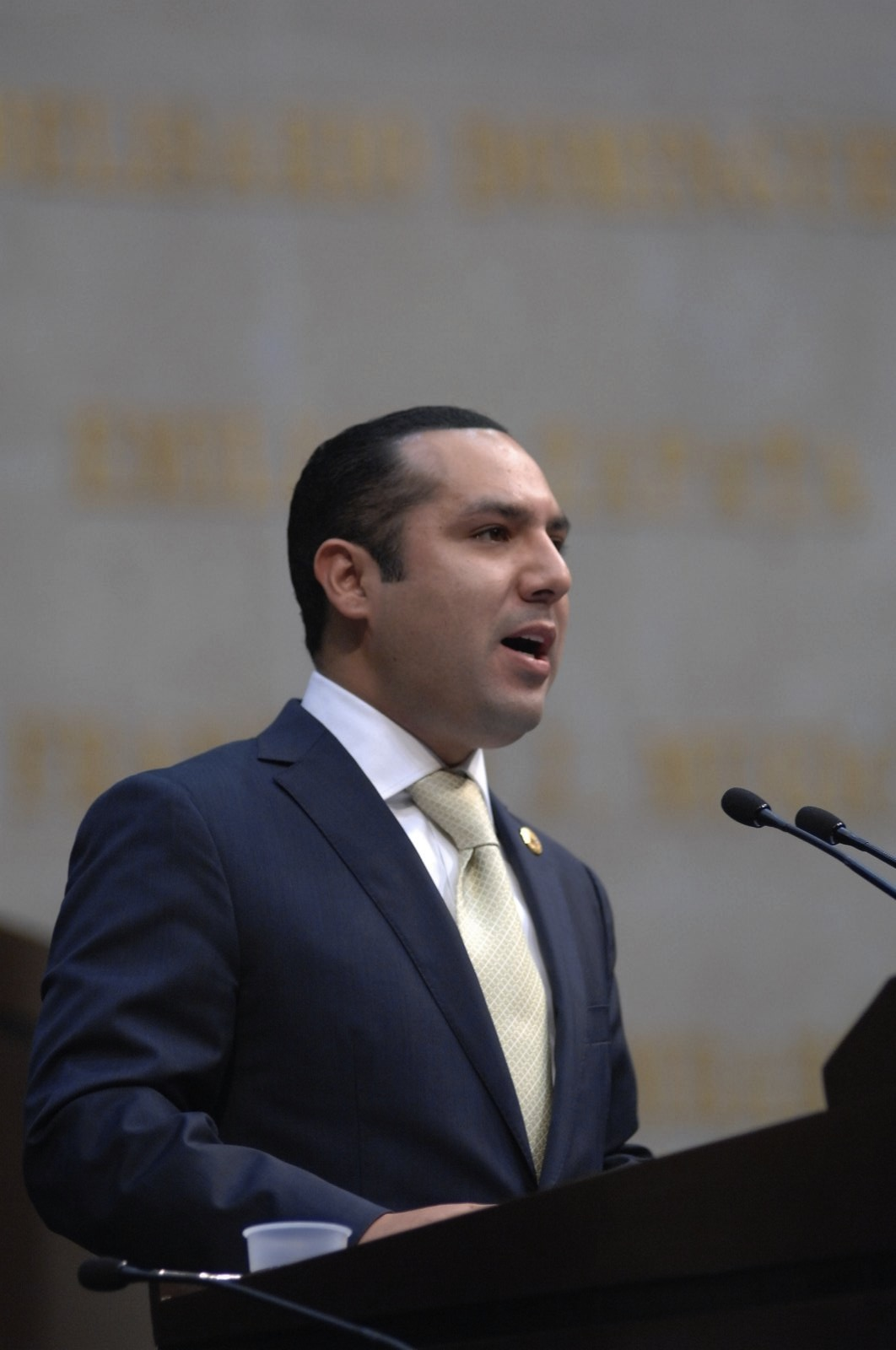
- Born: 5 August 1979 (age 46); Hidalgo, Mexico
- Occupation: Politician
- Political party: PRI

Alejandro Canek Vázquez Góngora (born 5 August 1979) is a Mexican politician from the Institutional Revolutionary Party. From 2009 to 2012 he served as Deputy of the LXI Legislature of the Mexican Congress representing Hidalgo.
