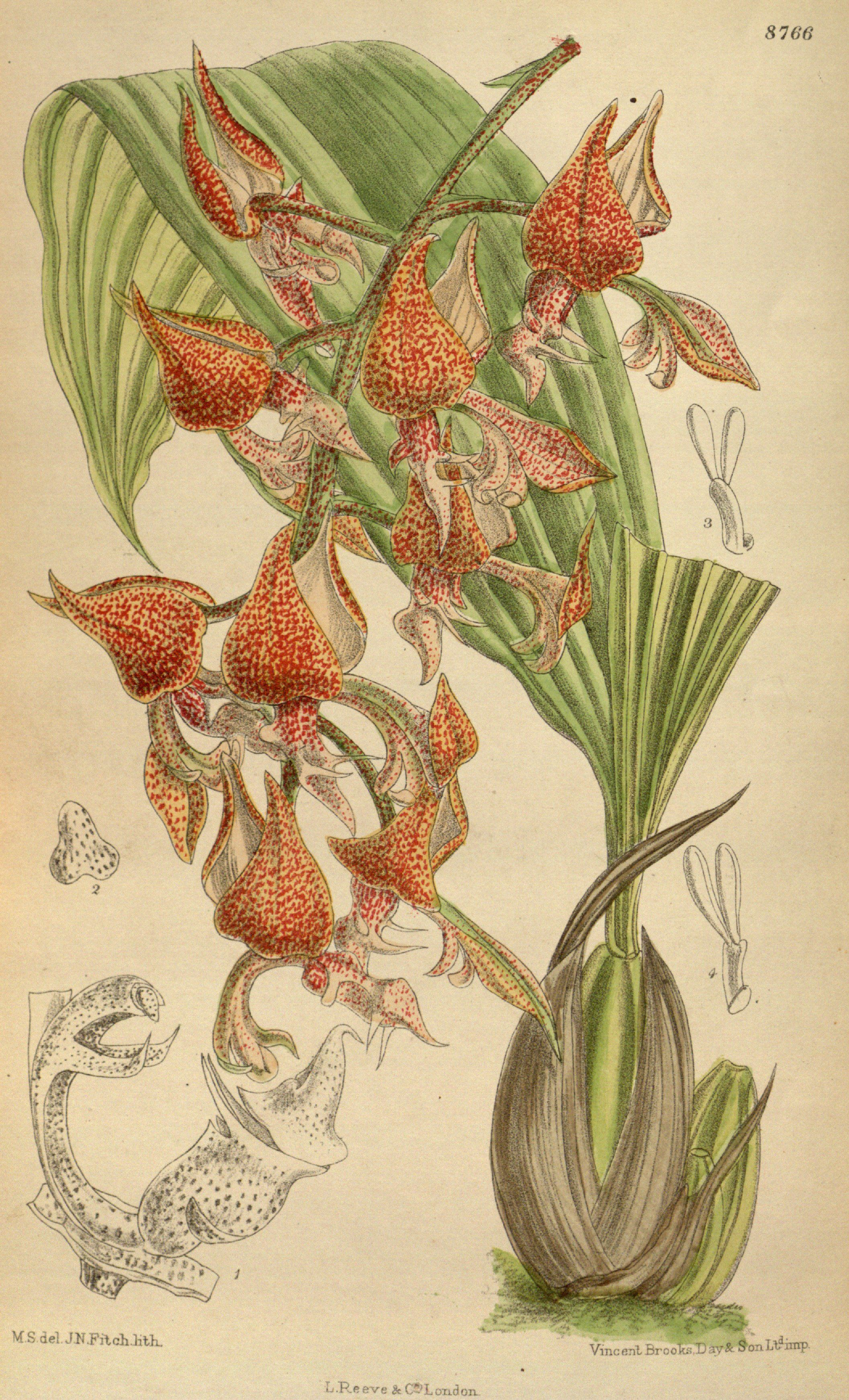
- Gongora latisepala

Scientific classification
- Kingdom: Plantae
- Clade: Tracheophytes
- Clade: Angiosperms
- Clade: Monocots
- Order: Asparagales
- Family: Orchidaceae
- Subfamily: Epidendroideae
- Tribe: Cymbidieae
- Subtribe: Stanhopeinae
- Genus: Gongora; Ruiz & Pav. (1794)

Species
- See text

Synonyms
- Acropera Lindl.

= Gongora =

Genus of orchids

Gongora, abbreviated Gga in horticultural trade, is a member of the orchid family (Orchidaceae). It consists of 65 species known from Central America, Trinidad, and tropical South America, with most species found in Colombia. They grow across a wide geographical range, from wet forests at sea level, to mountainous regions in the Andes, as high as 1,800 m.

The name comes from Antonio Caballero y Gongora, a viceroy of New Granada (Colombia and Ecuador) and the governor of Peru during the Ruiz and Pavón botanical expedition.

Gongora was one of the first orchids described by a European. Several new Gongora orchids have been discovered in the 2000s–2010s, whilst many others have been re-grouped under different classifications. Yet there is still some confusion; Many species lack "appropriate" descriptions. Some species, such as Gongora portentosa and Gongora superflua, are extremely isolated in population. DNA fingerprinting will, in time, contribute to an exact taxonomy of this genus.

All species in this genus are epiphytes, with a sympodial growth. The white aerial roots are very thin, growing in a dense mound. Some roots will travel, seeking out additional anchoring and nutrients, growing vertically/sideways rather than simply hanging down. This specialisation helps in forming the anchorage of the plant to its "host" tree.

Many of these orchids are found in association with ant nests; the ants are, in turn, attracted to nectar droplets from the plant, as well as any pest insects (aphid, mealybug, etc.) that may be present on the orchid. However, the ants do not prey on these pests; the bugs suck sap from the orchid (or any plant), and ultimately create waste excrement in the form of a "sweet" liquid, referred to as honeydew. Ants find this addicting; they will meticulously maintain the pest insect's population by caring for them, and guarding them, on the orchid plant. Whenever an ant is fatigued, they will simply approach an aphid/mealybug and "tap" its abdomen, communicating they are ready to "feed".

The conical pseudobulbs are ridged and are about 8 cm long. In some species, such as Gongora similis, the pseudobulb can produce up to six inflorescences in succession. Two alternate leaves originate from the end of each pseudobulb. The leaves are rather leathery and heavily veined, growing to a length of about 30 cm.

The racemose inflorescence grows from the base of the pseudobulbs. The stem first grows upright, but bends early in development and becomes pendulous. The numerous flowers hang upside down, with the lip upwards. The almost circularly bent pedicels are characteristic of this genus. There are two lateral sepals and one dorsal sepal. The blooms of several species are waxy. The flowers of many species have distinctive fragrances. Some smell like unburned candle wax, others like nutmeg, cardamom, or cinnamon. The pollinia are superposed on a stipe (a cellular pollinium stalk), which is held by a viscid disc.

The genus is closely related to Cirrhaea. For other relatives see also Stanhopeinae & Coeliopsidinae.

== Species ==
According to Rod Rice in Infragen. Rev. Gen. Gongora (2002, 2003) the genus Gongora can be classified into subgenera and sections as follows:

Subgenus Gongora

- Section Aceras with four species
- Section Gongora with about 30–33 species [G. atropurpurea, G. catilligera, G. latisepala, G. odoratissima, G. rufescens]
- Section Gratulabunda with four species
- Section Grossa with five species
- Section Truncata with nine species [G. charontis, G. dressleri, G. longipes, G. tracyana]

Subgenus Portentosa

- one section with at least five species [G. escobariana, G. garayana, G. portentosa, G. sanderiana]

Subgenus Acropera

- Section Acropera with one species
- Section Armeniaca with two species and one to two subspecies
- Section Cassidea with four species [G. amparoana, G. cassidea, G. galeata, G. tridentata]

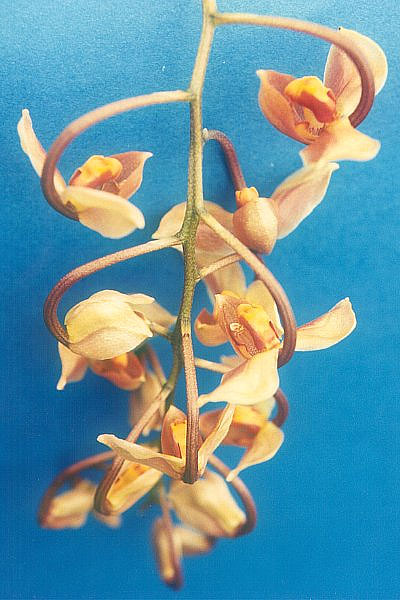
Gongora galeata

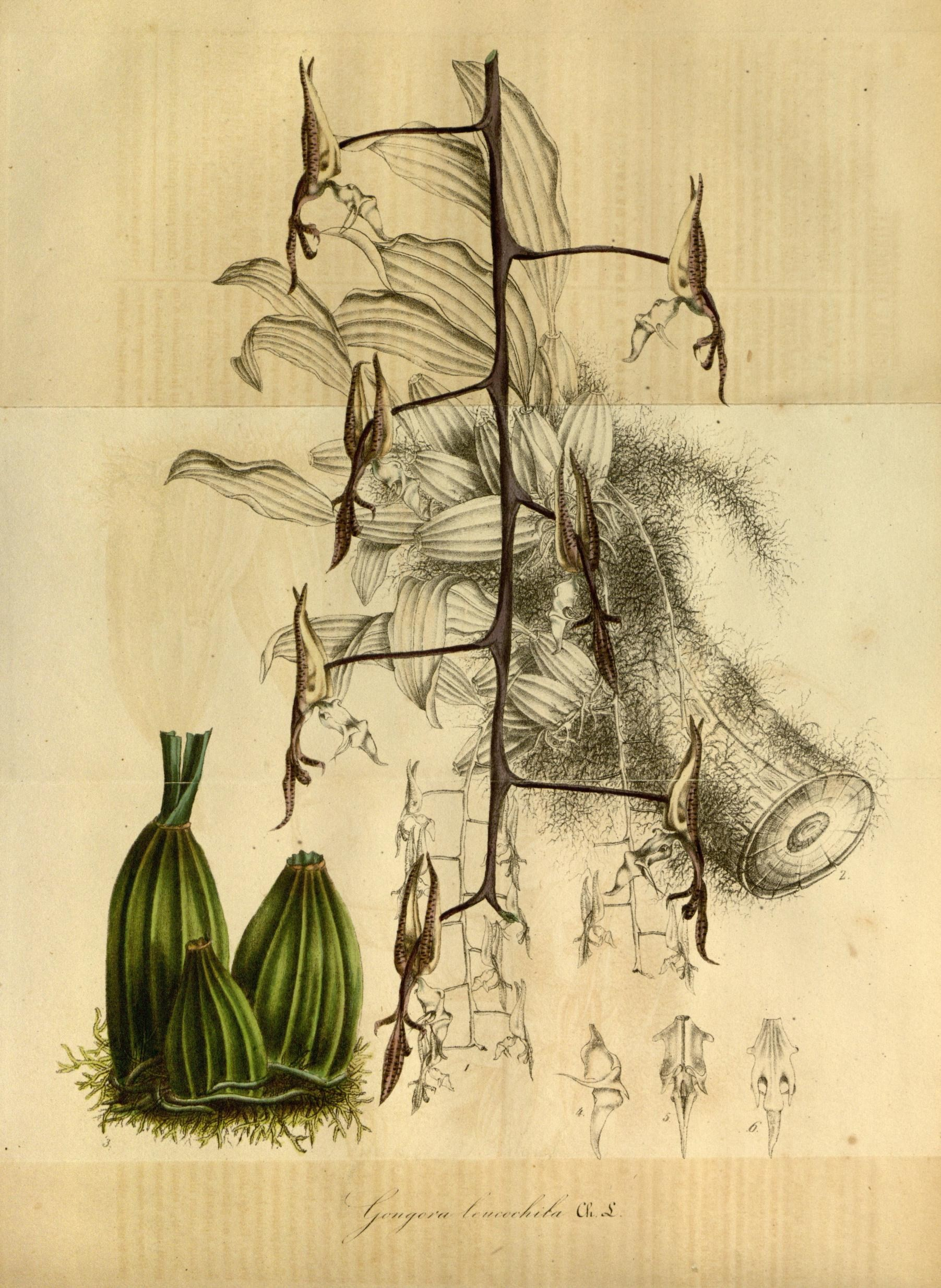
Gongora leucochila

- Gongora aceras (Ecuador).
- Gongora alfieana (S. America)
- Gongora amparoana (Costa Rica).
- Gongora arcuata (Colombia).
- Gongora armeniaca (C. America)
  - Gongora armeniaca subsp. armeniaca (C. America).. Pseudobulb epiphyte
  - Gongora armeniaca subsp. cornuta (Nicaragua to Costa Rica). Pseudobulb epiphyte
- Gongora aromatica (C. America)
- Gongora atropurpurea (Trinidad and Tobago to S. Trop. America).
- Gongora beyrodtiana (Colombia).
- Gongora bufonia (SE. Brazil).
- Gongora cassidea (Mexico – Chiapas) to C. America).
- Gongora catilligera (Colombia).
- Gongora charontis (Colombia).
- Gongora chocoensis (Colombia).
- Gongora claviodora (C. America).
- Gongora colombiana (Colombia).
- Gongora cruciformis (Peru).
- Gongora dressleri (Panama).
- Gongora ecornuta (Ecuador to Peru).
- Gongora erecta (Peru).
- Gongora escobariana (Colombia).
- Gongora flaveola (Colombia).
- Gongora fulva (Panama to Colombia).

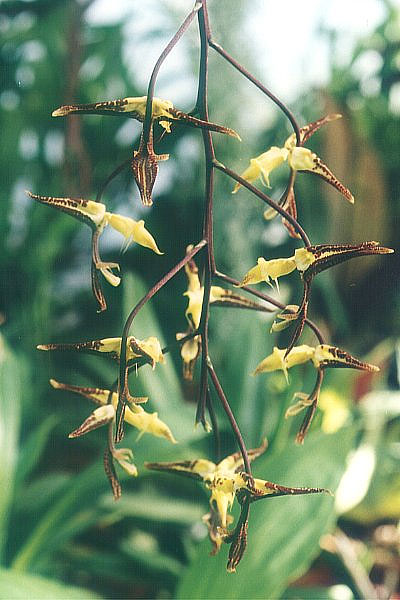
Gongora maculata

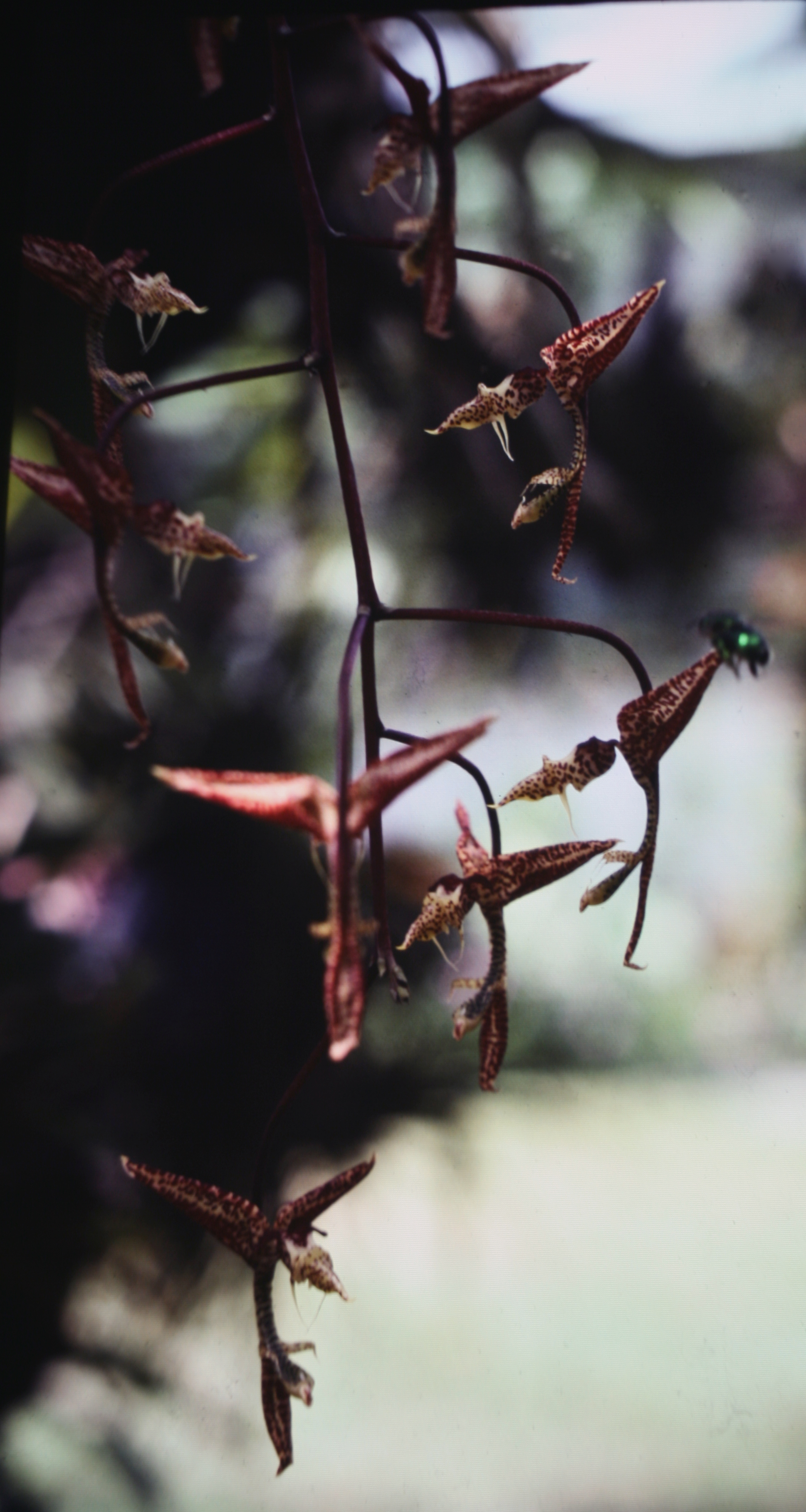
Gongora quinquenervis

- Gongora galeata (Mexico to Guatemala).
- Gongora galeottiana (SW. Mexico).
- Gongora garayana (Colombia).
- Gongora gibba (Costa Rica to Panama).
- Gongora gratulabunda (Colombia).
- Gongora grossa (Venezuela to Ecuador).
- Gongora hirtzii (S. Colombia to Ecuador).
- Gongora histrionica (Costa Rica to N. South America).
- Gongora hookeri (Guyana to Peru).
- Gongora horichiana (Costa Rica to Panama).
- Gongora ileneana (Bolivia).
- Gongora ilense (Ecuador).
- Gongora irmgardiae (Colombia).
- Gongora lagunae (Venezuela).
- Gongora latibasis (Panama to Ecuador).
- Gongora latisepala (Colombia).
- Gongora leucochila (Mexico – Veracruz, Chiapas to C. America).
- Gongora maculata (Trinidad, Guyana, Peru).
  - Gongora maculata var. lactea (Trinidad) Pseudobulb epiphyte
  - Gongora maculata var. maculata (Guyana, Peru). Pseudobulb epiphyte
- Gongora minax (N. Brazil).
- Gongora nigrita (South America)
- Gongora nigropunctata (N. Peru).
- Gongora odoratissima (E. Colombia to Venezuela).
- Gongora pardina (Ecuador).
- Gongora passiflorolens (Colombia)
- Gongora pleiochroma (N. & W. South America)
- Gongora portentosa (Colombia).
  - Gongora portentosa var. portentosa (Colombia) Pseudobulb epiphyte
  - Gongora portentosa var. rosea (Colombia). Pseudobulb epiphyte
- Gongora pseudoatropurpurea (Colombia).
- Gongora quinquenervis (Colombia to Peru) : this species forms a complex for several ill-defined species
- Gongora retrorsa (W. Venezuela)
- Gongora rosea (Colombia to Peru).
- Gongora rubescens (Ecuador).
- Gongora rufescens (Colombia to Ecuador).
- Gongora saccata (Mexico – Veracruz).
- Gongora sanderiana (Colombia, Peru).
- Gongora scaphephorus (Ecuador to Peru).
- Gongora seideliana (Mexico – Chiapas).
- Gongora similis (Colombia).
- Gongora sphaerica (Colombia).
- Gongora superflua (Ecuador).
- Gongora tracyana (Colombia, Peru).
- Gongora tridentata (Mexico – Chiapas to Guatemala).
- Gongora truncata (Mexico to C. America)
- Gongora unicolor (Mexico – Veracruz, Chiapas to C. America).

== Intergeneric hybrids ==
- Houllora (Gongora × Houlletia) Orchid Review, 108(1234): new orchid hybrids 15 (2000), IPNI ID#: 1014858-1
- Gonginia (Gongora × Paphinia) Sander's List Orchid Hybrids Addendum 2002–2004. xxxiv. 2005 (20 May 2005), IPNI ID: 77068862-1
- Polygora (Gongora × Polycyncis) Orchid Review, 108(1234): new orchid hybrids 15 (2000), IPNI ID#: 1014858-1
- Stangora (Gongora × Stanhopea) Orchid Review, 92(1091): centre page pull-out p. 8 (1984), IPNI ID#: 893423-1
