= S. graveolens =

S. graveolens may refer to:

- Sanicula graveolens, the northern sanicle or Sierra blacksnakeroot, a flowering plant species found in the Americas
- Stanhopea graveolens, an orchid species occurring from Mexico to Honduras
