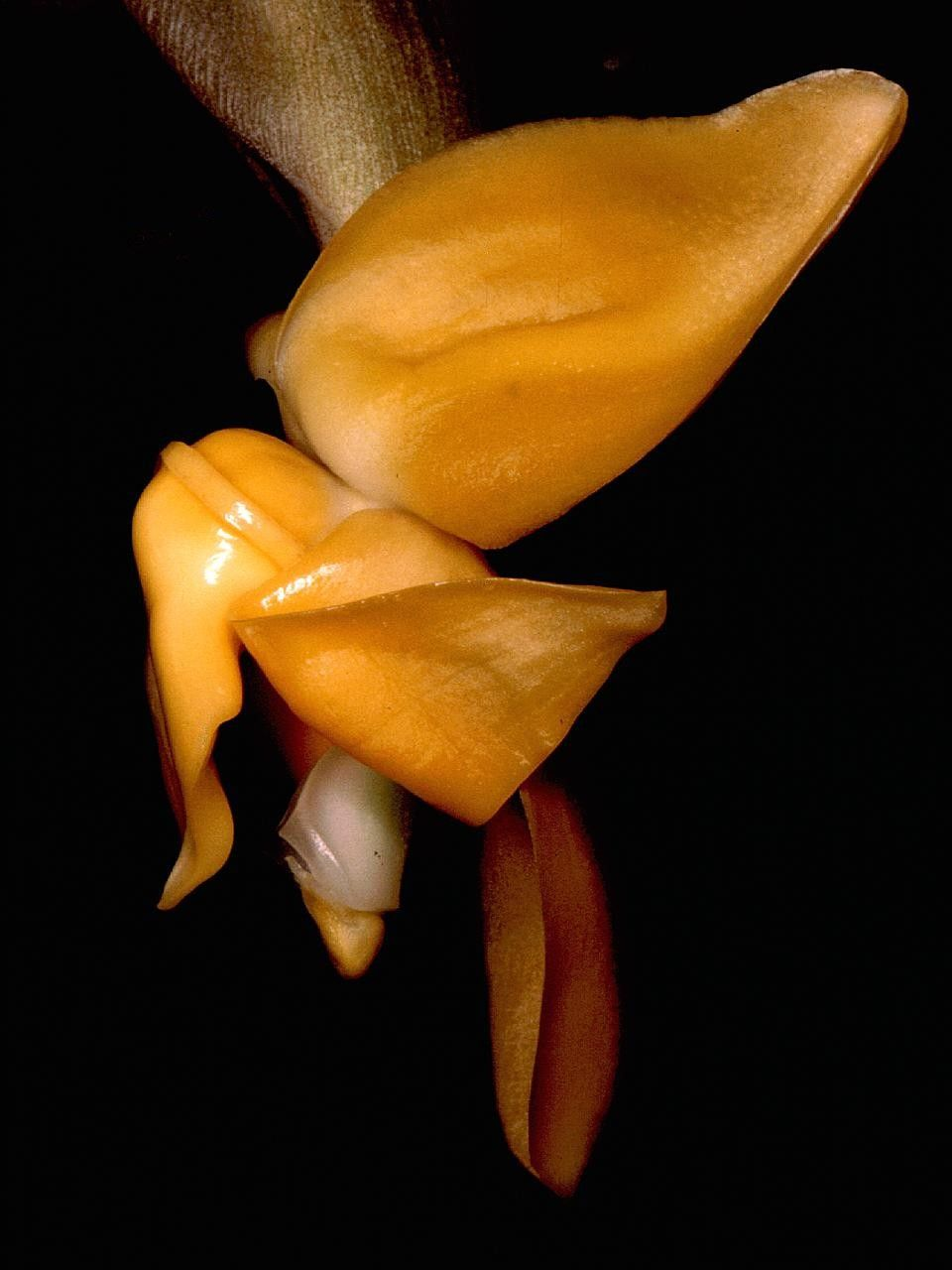
- Stanhopea annulata flower

Scientific classification
- Kingdom: Plantae
- Clade: Tracheophytes
- Clade: Angiosperms
- Clade: Monocots
- Order: Asparagales
- Family: Orchidaceae
- Subfamily: Epidendroideae
- Genus: Stanhopea
- Species: S. annulata

Binomial name
- Stanhopea annulata Mansf.

= Stanhopea annulata =

Species of orchid

Stanhopea annulata is a species of orchid occurring from southern Colombia to Ecuador.
