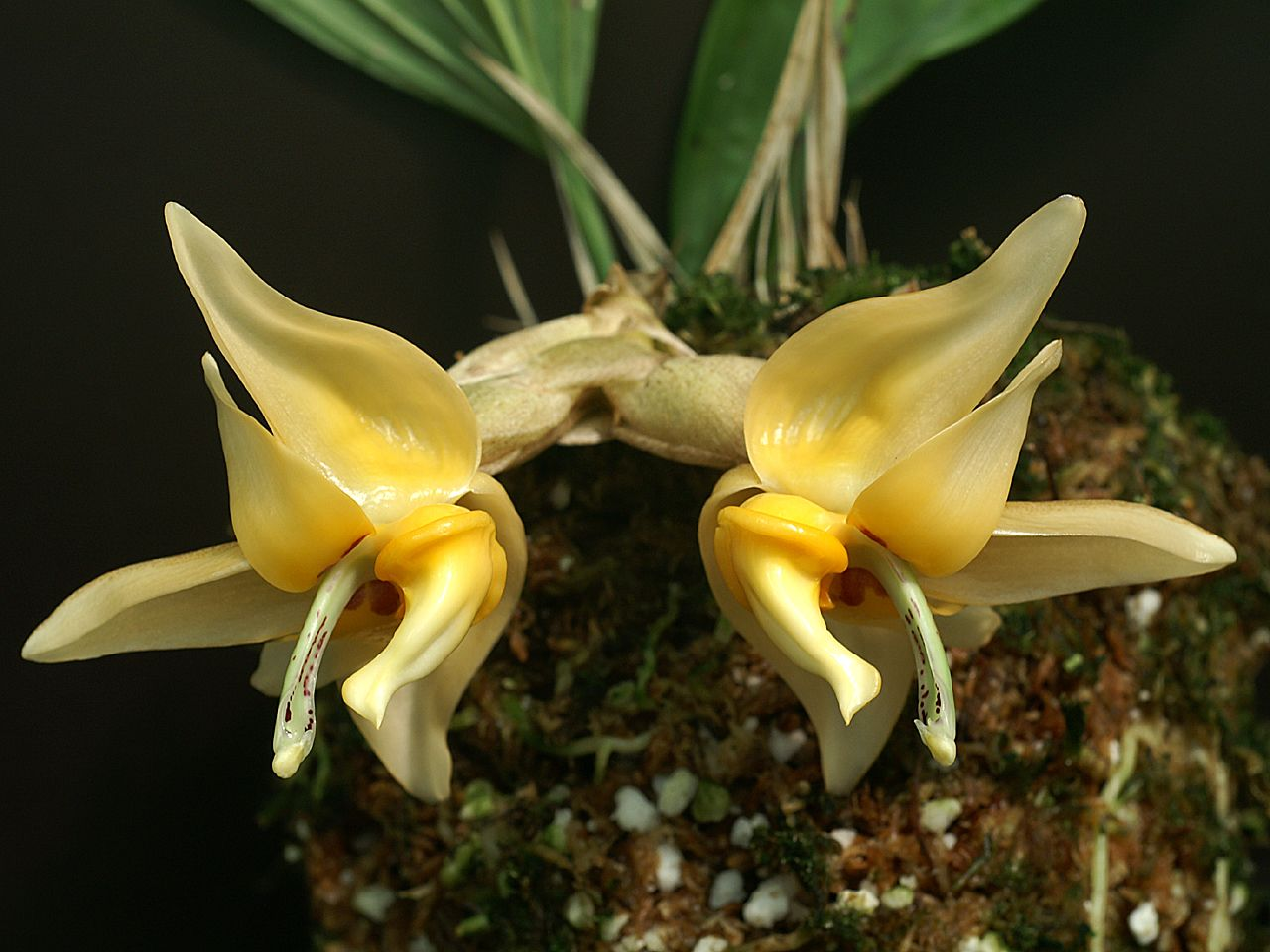
- Stanhopea avicula flower

Scientific classification
- Kingdom: Plantae
- Clade: Tracheophytes
- Clade: Angiosperms
- Clade: Monocots
- Order: Asparagales
- Family: Orchidaceae
- Subfamily: Epidendroideae
- Genus: Stanhopea
- Species: S. avicula

Binomial name
- Stanhopea avicula Dressler

Synonyms
- Stanhopeastrum aviculum (Dressler) Szlach.

= Stanhopea avicula =

Species of orchid

Stanhopea avicula is a species of orchid endemic to Panama.
