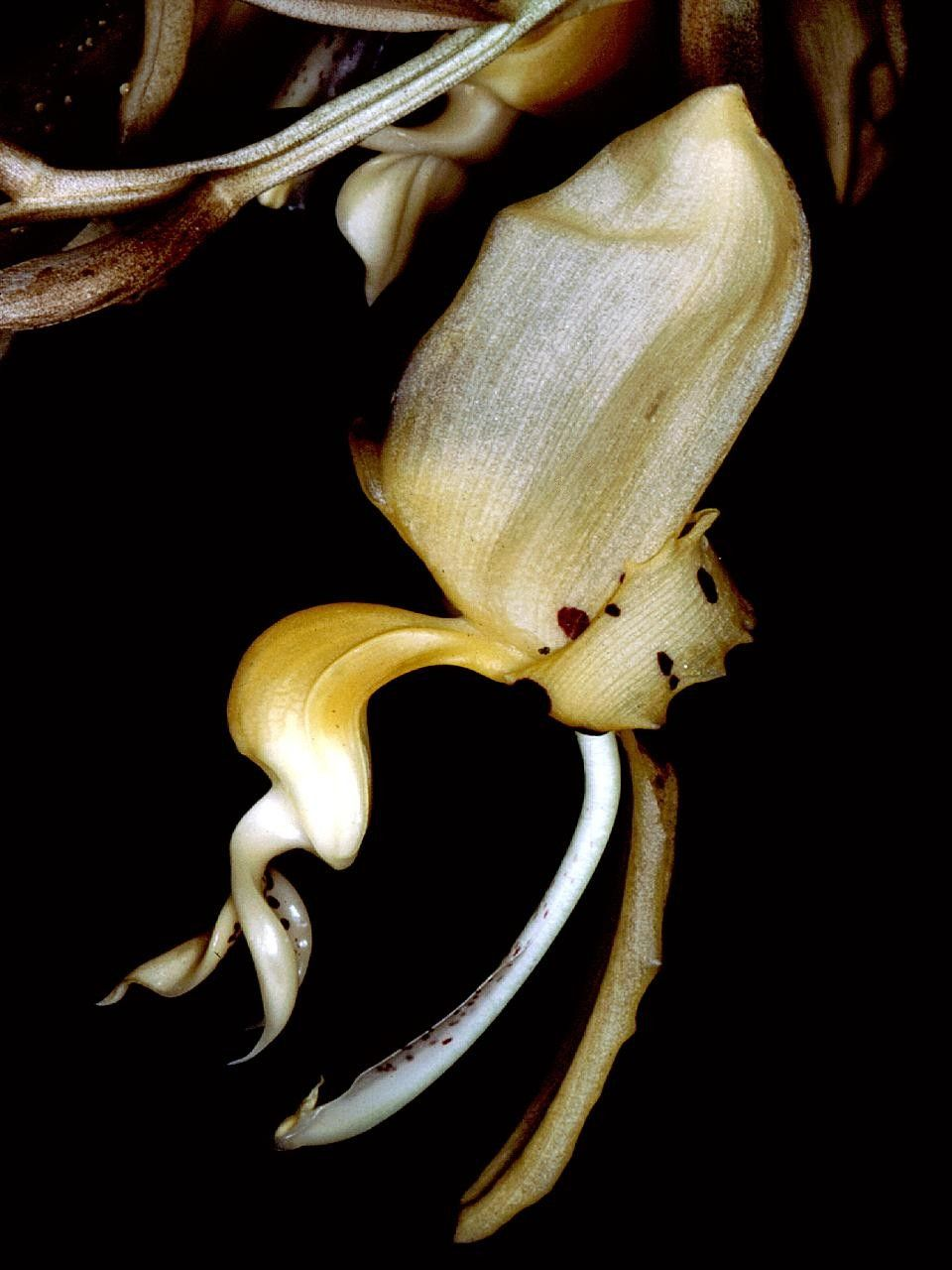
- Stanhopea frymirei flower

Scientific classification
- Kingdom: Plantae
- Clade: Tracheophytes
- Clade: Angiosperms
- Clade: Monocots
- Order: Asparagales
- Family: Orchidaceae
- Subfamily: Epidendroideae
- Genus: Stanhopea
- Species: S. frymirei

Binomial name
- Stanhopea frymirei Dodson

= Stanhopea frymirei =

Species of orchid

Stanhopea frymirei is a species of orchid endemic to Ecuador.
