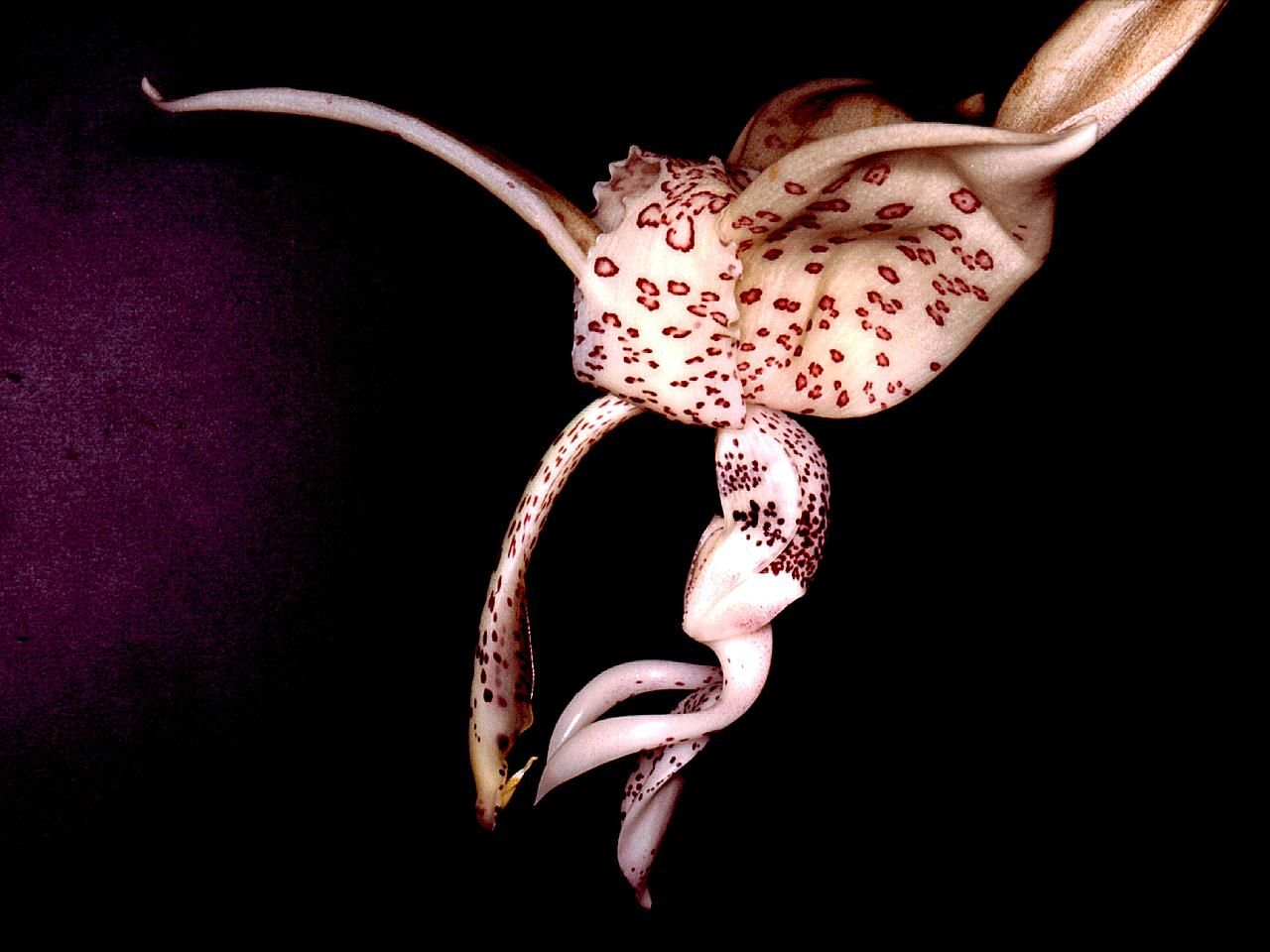
- Stanhopea haseloffiana flower

Scientific classification
- Kingdom: Plantae
- Clade: Tracheophytes
- Clade: Angiosperms
- Clade: Monocots
- Order: Asparagales
- Family: Orchidaceae
- Subfamily: Epidendroideae
- Genus: Stanhopea
- Species: S. haseloffiana

Binomial name
- Stanhopea haseloffiana Rchb.f.

= Stanhopea haseloffiana =

Species of orchid

Stanhopea haseloffiana is a species of orchid endemic to northeastern Peru.
