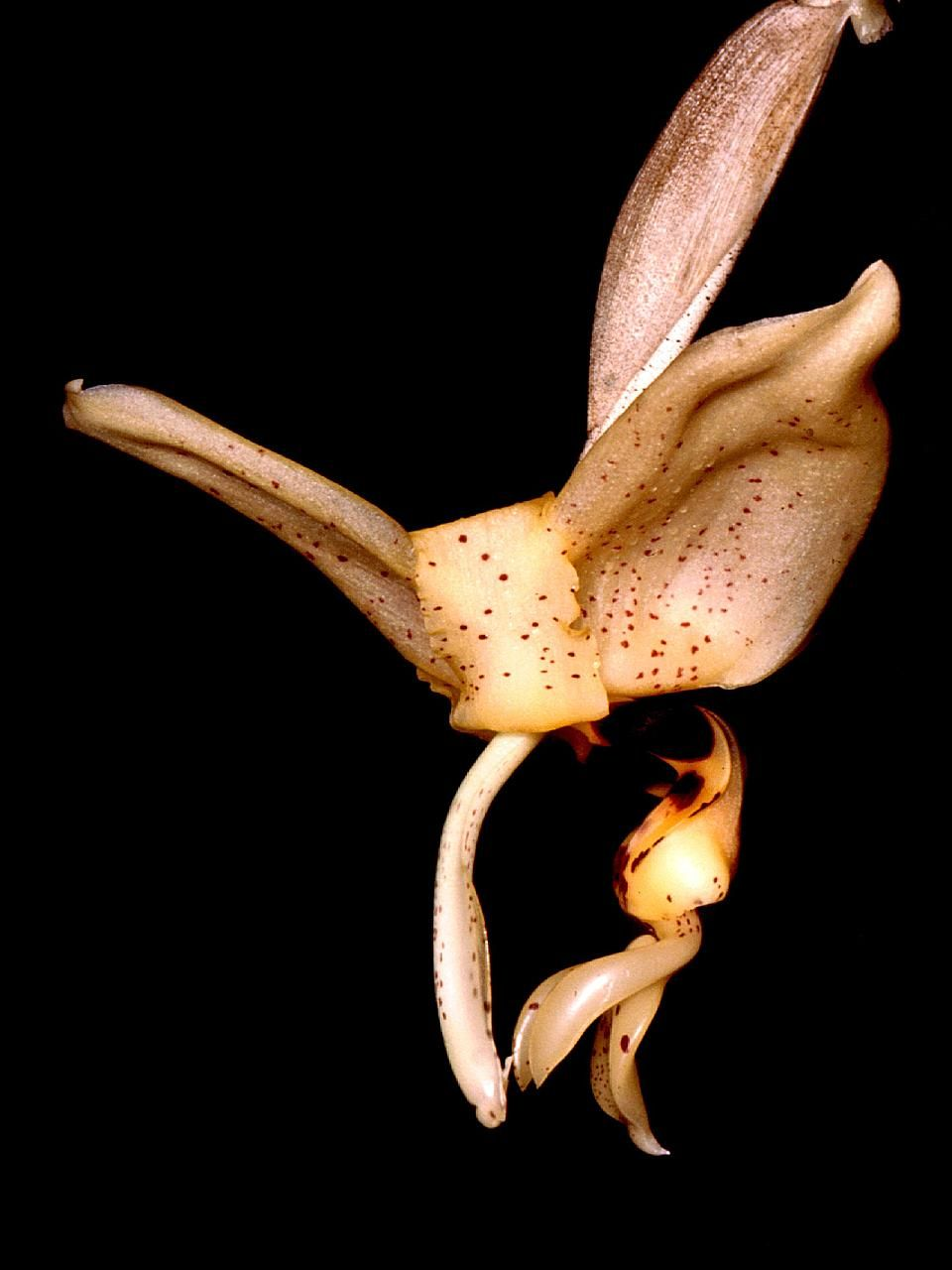
- Stanhopea nigripes flower

Scientific classification
- Kingdom: Plantae
- Clade: Tracheophytes
- Clade: Angiosperms
- Clade: Monocots
- Order: Asparagales
- Family: Orchidaceae
- Subfamily: Epidendroideae
- Genus: Stanhopea
- Species: S. nigripes

Binomial name
- Stanhopea nigripes Rolfe

= Stanhopea nigripes =

Species of orchid

Stanhopea nigripes is a species of orchid endemic to Peru.
