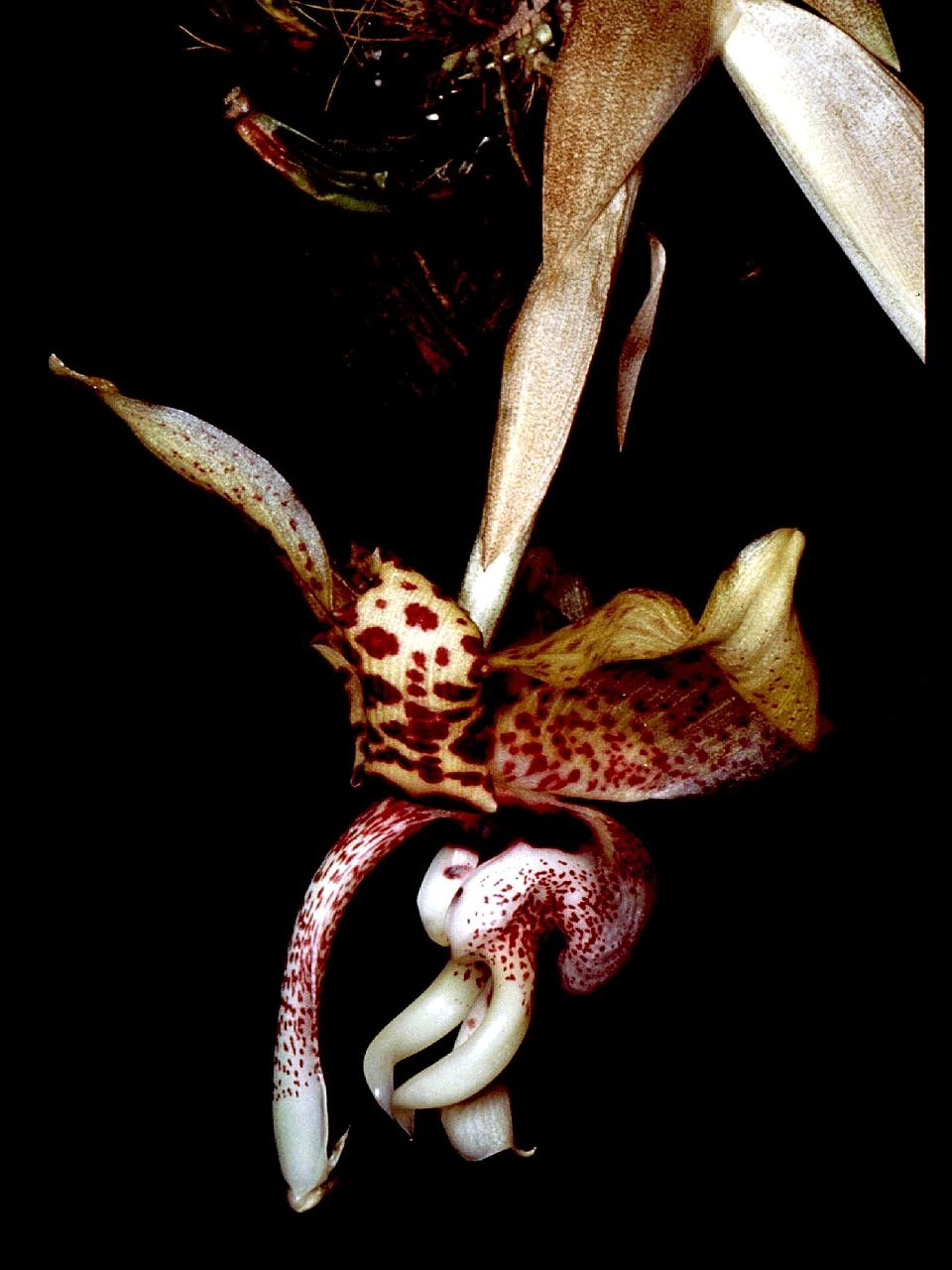
- Stanhopea hernandezii flower

Scientific classification
- Kingdom: Plantae
- Clade: Tracheophytes
- Clade: Angiosperms
- Clade: Monocots
- Order: Asparagales
- Family: Orchidaceae
- Subfamily: Epidendroideae
- Genus: Stanhopea
- Species: S. hernandezii

Binomial name
- Stanhopea hernandezii (Kunth) Schltr.

Synonyms
- Anguloa hernandezii Kunth (basionym); Maxillaria lyncea Lindl.; Stanhopea devoniensis Lindl.; Stanhopea lyncea (Lindl.) P.N.Don; Stanhopea cavendishii Lindl. ex W.Baxter

= Stanhopea hernandezii =

Species of orchid

Stanhopea hernandezii is a species of orchid endemic to central and southwestern Mexico.
