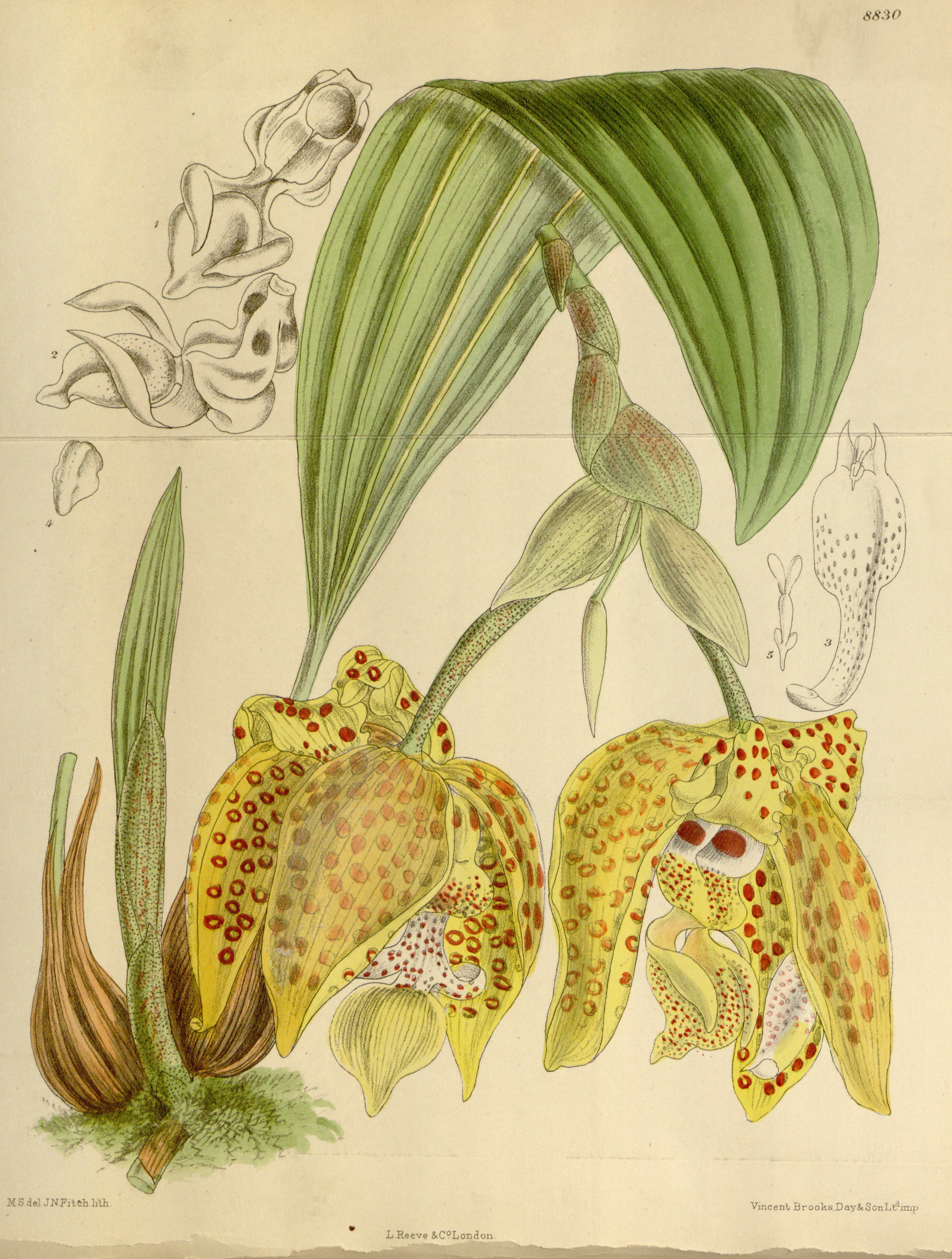

Scientific classification
- Kingdom: Plantae
- Clade: Tracheophytes
- Clade: Angiosperms
- Clade: Monocots
- Order: Asparagales
- Family: Orchidaceae
- Subfamily: Epidendroideae
- Genus: Stanhopea
- Species: S. costaricensis

Binomial name
- Stanhopea costaricensis Rchb.f.

= Stanhopea costaricensis =

Species of orchid

Stanhopea costaricensis is a species of orchid endemic to Central America (Costa Rica, El Salvador, Guatemala, Honduras, Nicaragua and Panama).

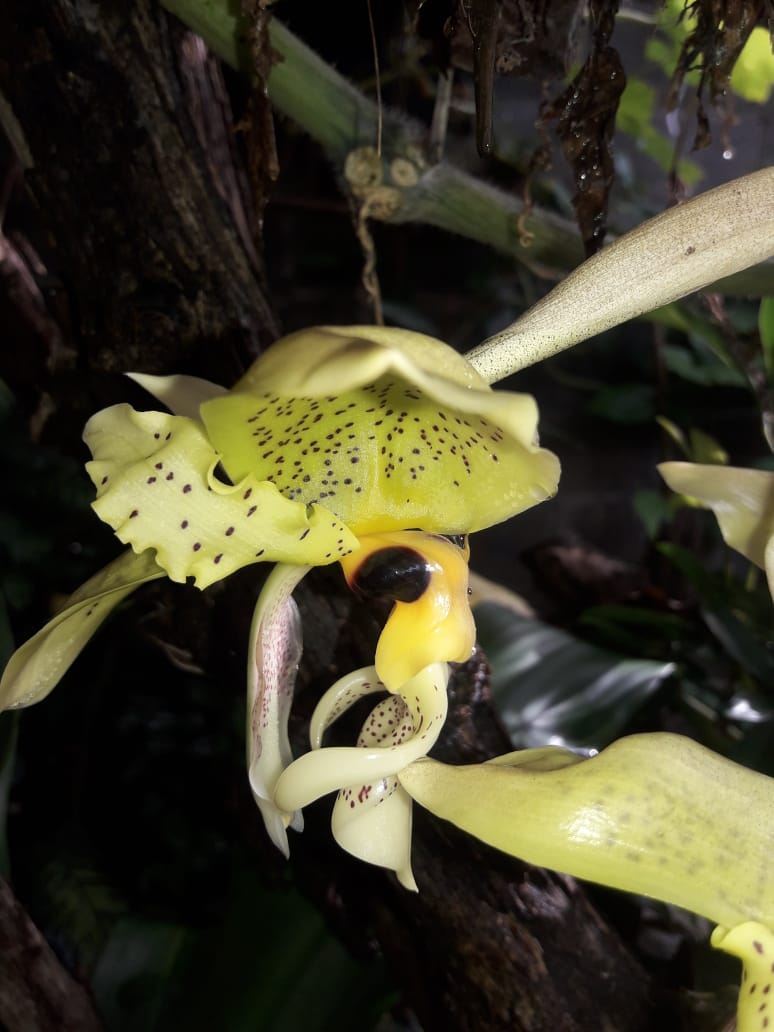
Flower of "Torito", 26 oct. 2020

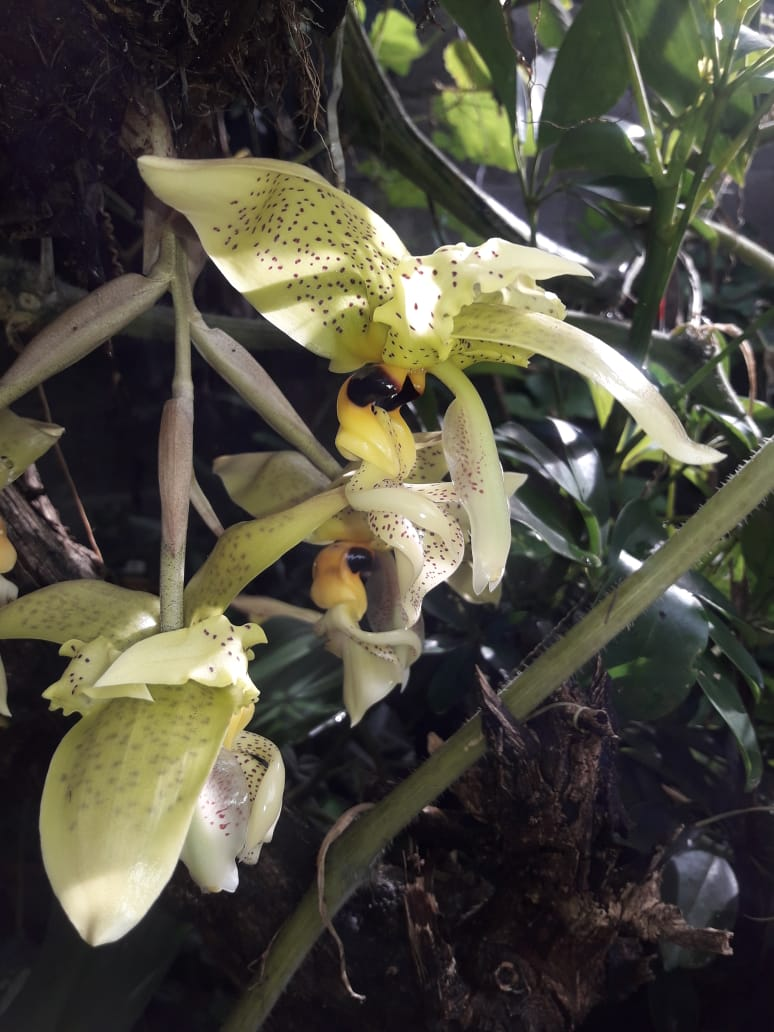
Stanhopea costaricensis "Torito"
