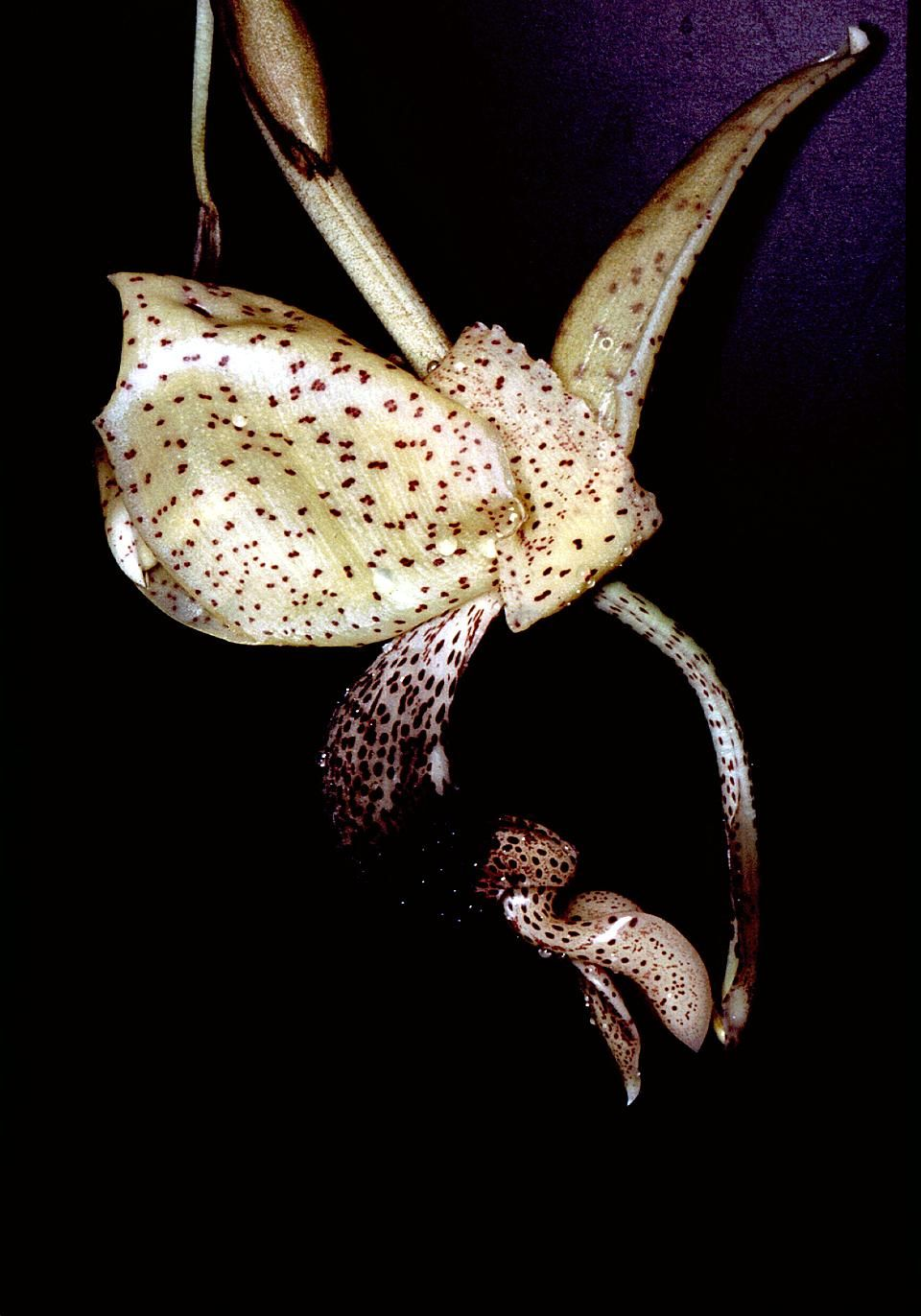
- Stanhopea platyceras flower

Scientific classification
- Kingdom: Plantae
- Clade: Tracheophytes
- Clade: Angiosperms
- Clade: Monocots
- Order: Asparagales
- Family: Orchidaceae
- Subfamily: Epidendroideae
- Genus: Stanhopea
- Species: S. platyceras

Binomial name
- Stanhopea platyceras Rchb.f.

= Stanhopea platyceras =

Species of orchid

Stanhopea platyceras is a species of orchid endemic to Colombia.
