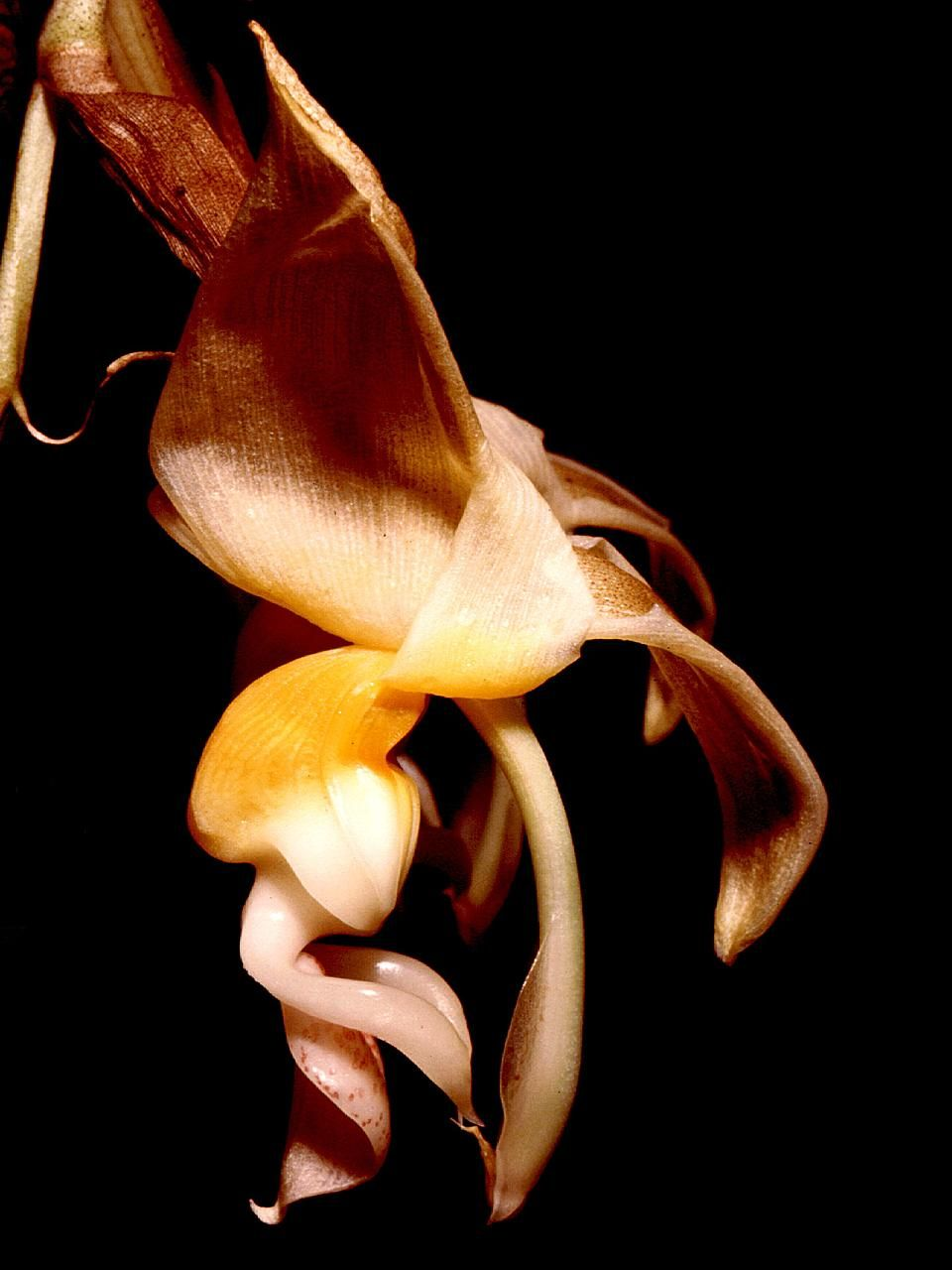
- Stanhopea lietzei flower

Scientific classification
- Kingdom: Plantae
- Clade: Tracheophytes
- Clade: Angiosperms
- Clade: Monocots
- Order: Asparagales
- Family: Orchidaceae
- Subfamily: Epidendroideae
- Genus: Stanhopea
- Species: S. lietzei

Binomial name
- Stanhopea lietzei Regel (Schltr.)

= Stanhopea lietzei =

Species of orchid

Stanhopea lietzei is a species of orchid endemic to eastern and southern Brazil.
