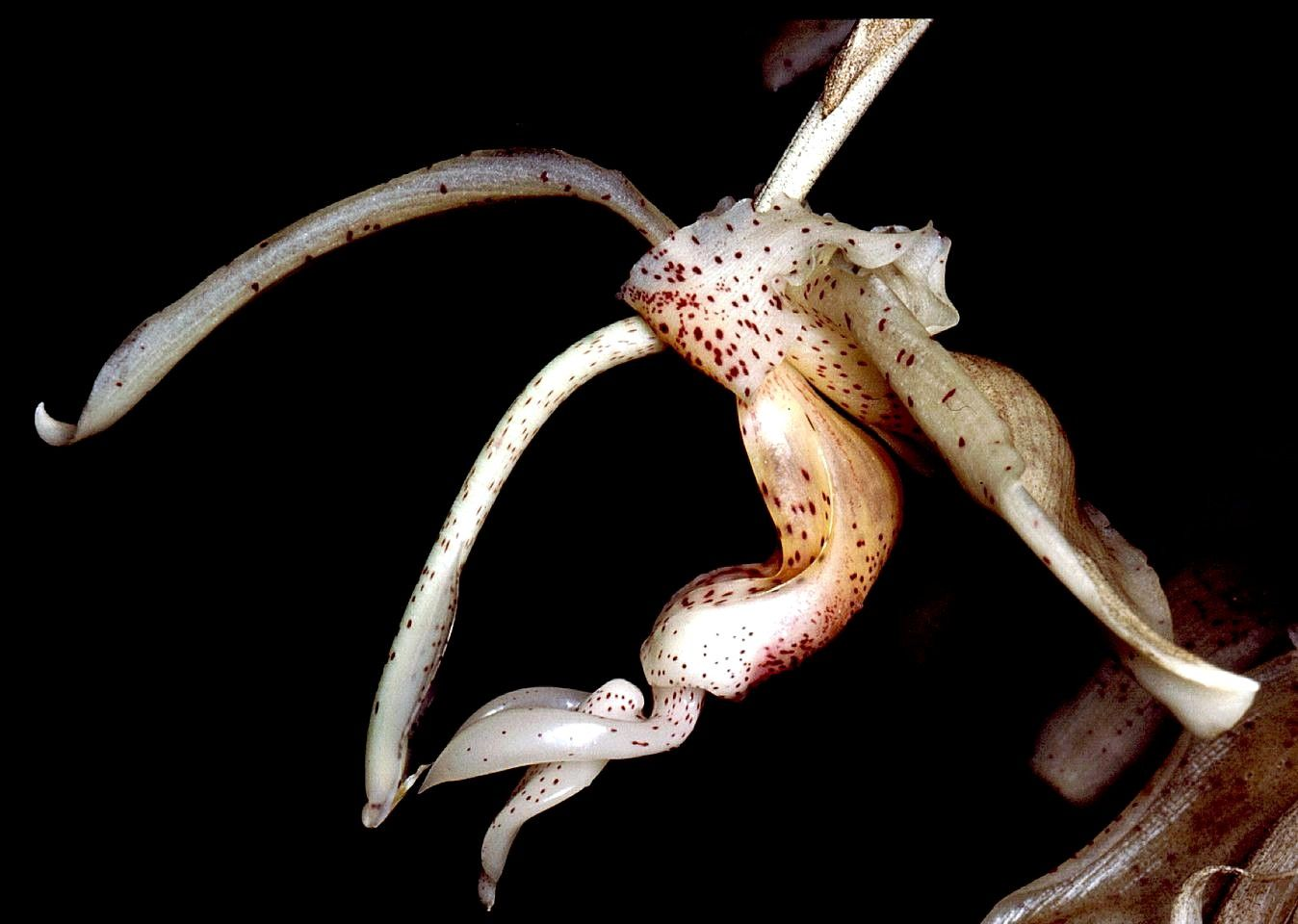
- Stanhopea florida flower

Scientific classification
- Kingdom: Plantae
- Clade: Tracheophytes
- Clade: Angiosperms
- Clade: Monocots
- Order: Asparagales
- Family: Orchidaceae
- Subfamily: Epidendroideae
- Genus: Stanhopea
- Species: S. florida

Binomial name
- Stanhopea florida Rchb.f.

= Stanhopea florida =

Species of orchid

Stanhopea florida is a species of orchid occurring from Ecuador to Peru.
