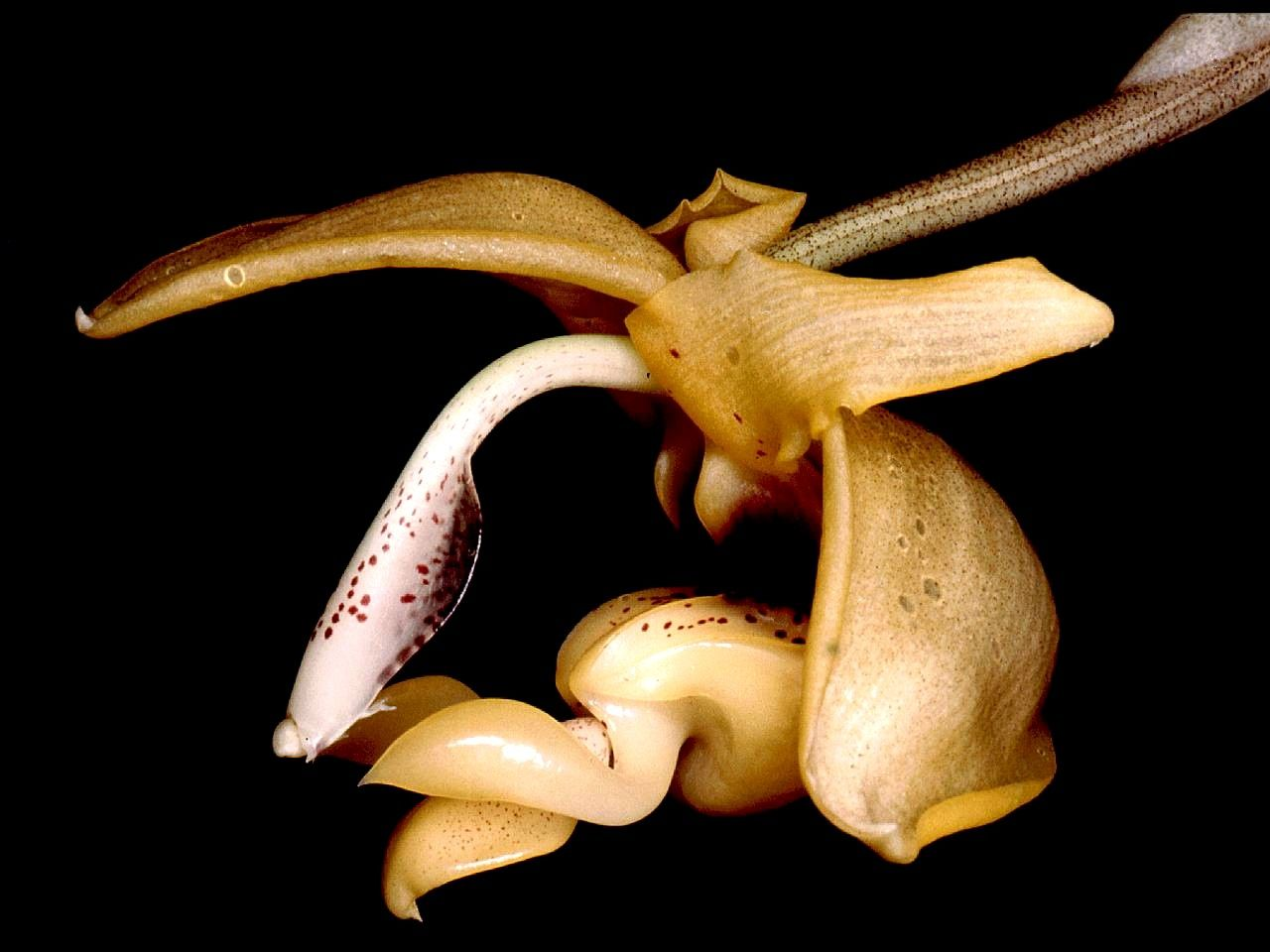
- Stanhopea anfracta flower

Scientific classification
- Kingdom: Plantae
- Clade: Tracheophytes
- Clade: Angiosperms
- Clade: Monocots
- Order: Asparagales
- Family: Orchidaceae
- Subfamily: Epidendroideae
- Genus: Stanhopea
- Species: S. anfracta

Binomial name
- Stanhopea anfracta Rchb.f.

= Stanhopea anfracta =

Species of orchid

Stanhopea anfracta is a species of orchid occurring from southeastern Ecuador to Bolivia.
