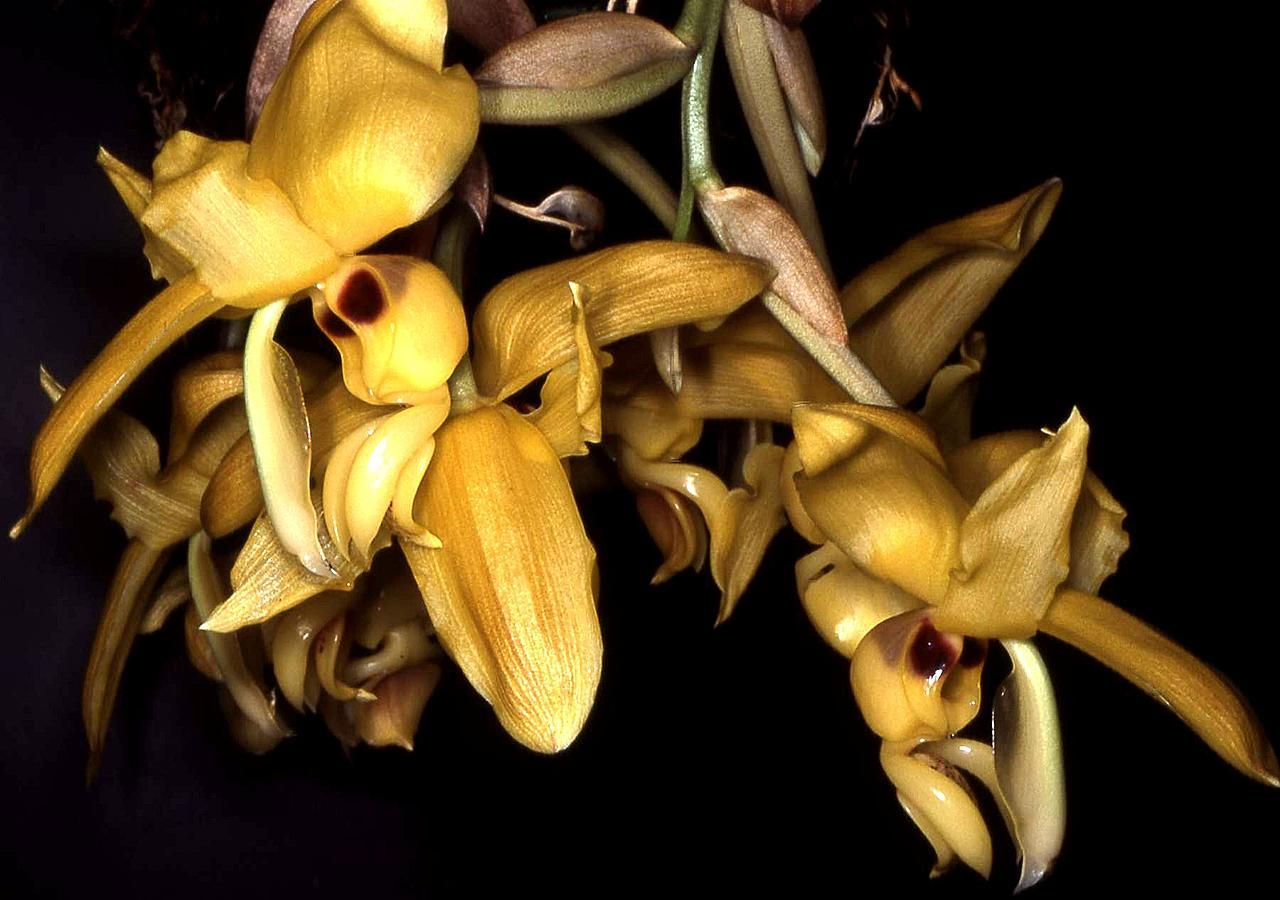
- Stanhopea warszewicziana flowers

Scientific classification
- Kingdom: Plantae
- Clade: Tracheophytes
- Clade: Angiosperms
- Clade: Monocots
- Order: Asparagales
- Family: Orchidaceae
- Subfamily: Epidendroideae
- Genus: Stanhopea
- Species: S. warszewicziana

Binomial name
- Stanhopea warszewicziana Klotzsch

= Stanhopea warszewicziana =

Species of orchid

Stanhopea warszewicziana is a species of orchid found from Costa Rica to western Panama.
