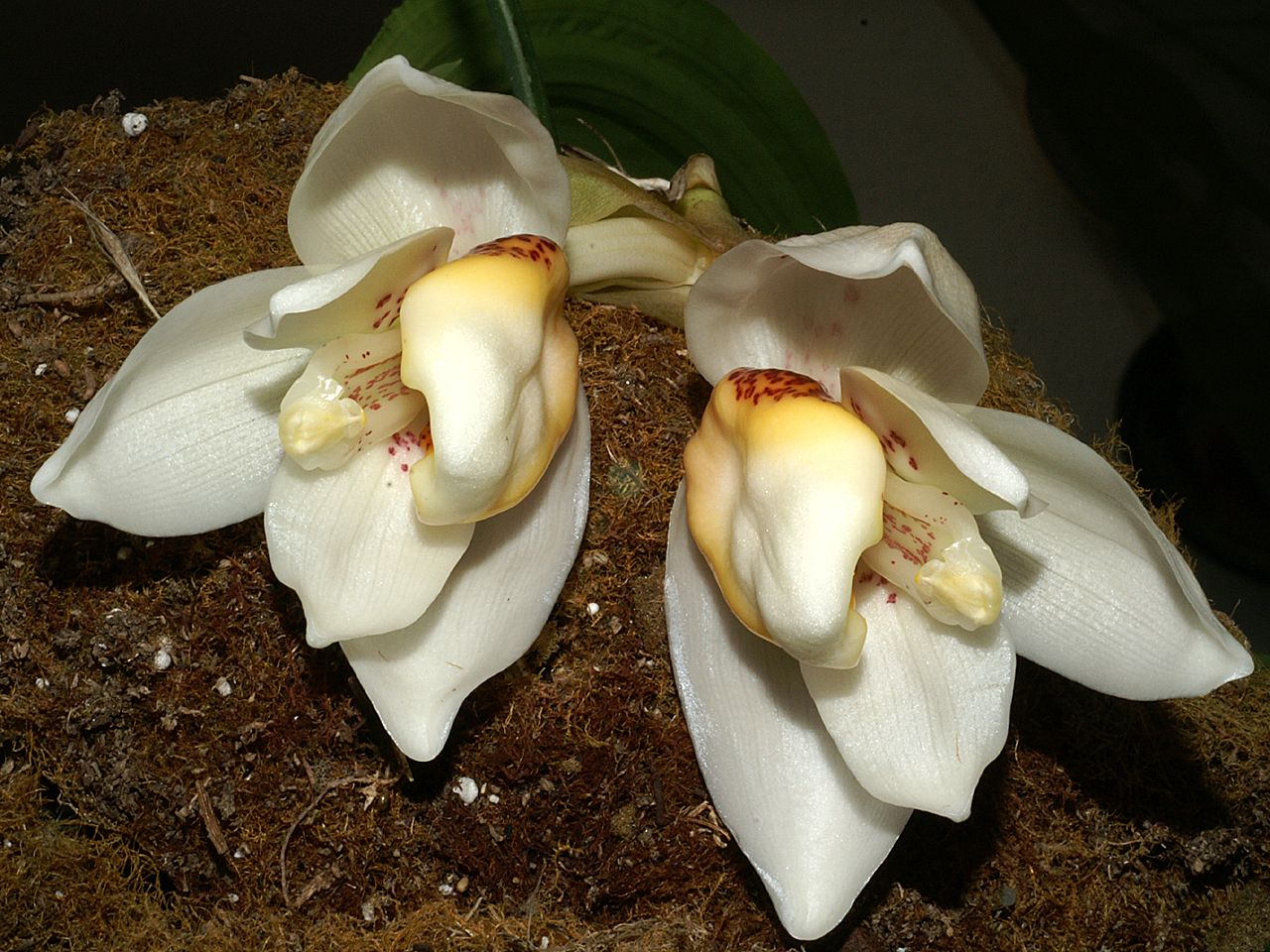
- Stanhopea ecornuta flower

Scientific classification
- Kingdom: Plantae
- Clade: Tracheophytes
- Clade: Angiosperms
- Clade: Monocots
- Order: Asparagales
- Family: Orchidaceae
- Subfamily: Epidendroideae
- Genus: Stanhopea
- Species: S. ecornuta

Binomial name
- Stanhopea ecornuta Lem.

Synonyms
- Stanhopeastrum ecornutum Rchb.f.; Stanhopea calceolus Rchb.f.

= Stanhopea ecornuta =

Species of orchid

Stanhopea ecornuta is a species of orchid endemic to Central America (Belize, Costa Rica, Guatemala, Honduras, Nicaragua and Panama).
