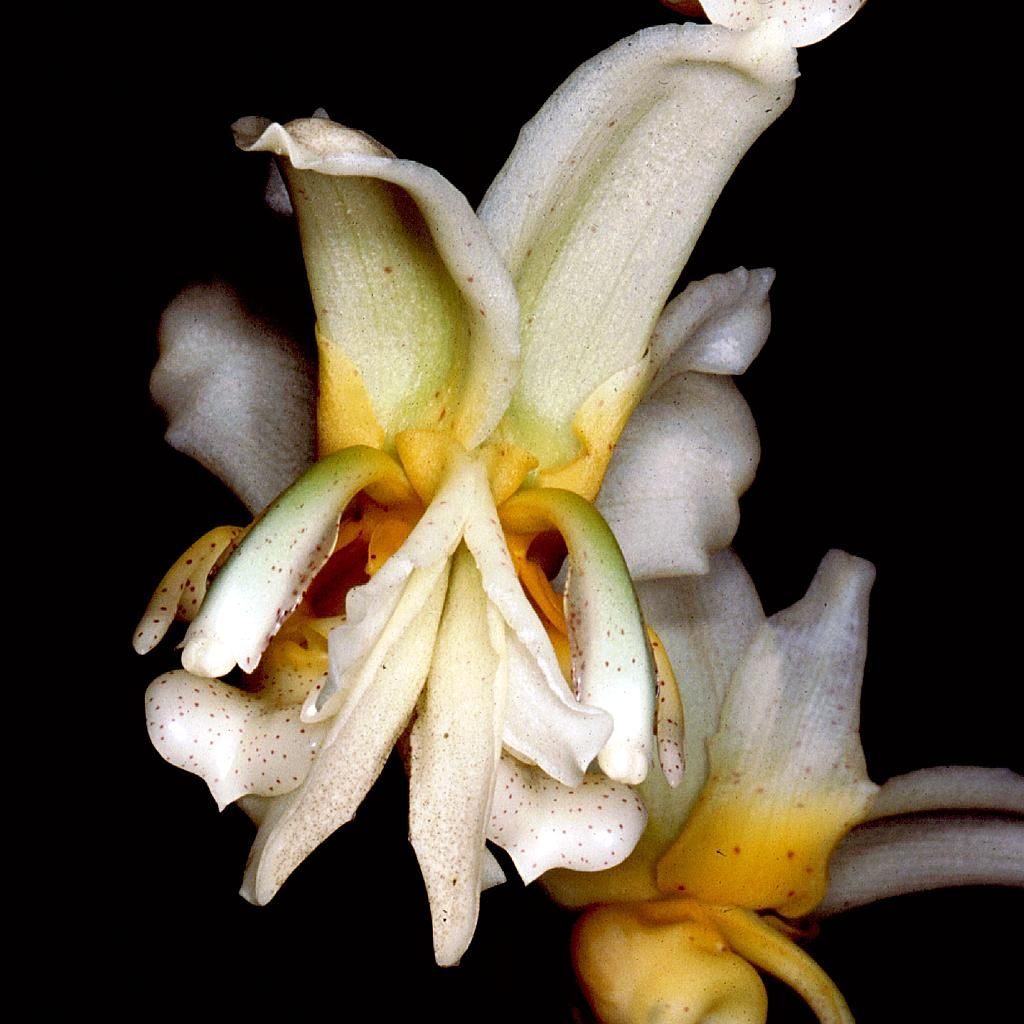
- Stanhopea pseudoradiosa flower

Scientific classification
- Kingdom: Plantae
- Clade: Embryophytes
- Clade: Tracheophytes
- Clade: Spermatophytes
- Clade: Angiosperms
- Clade: Monocots
- Order: Asparagales
- Family: Orchidaceae
- Subfamily: Epidendroideae
- Genus: Stanhopea
- Species: S. pseudoradiosa

Binomial name
- Stanhopea pseudoradiosa Jenny & R.Gonzalez

= Stanhopea pseudoradiosa =

Species of orchid

Stanhopea pseudoradiosa is a species of orchid endemic to southwestern Mexico. It is found in the provinces of Oaxaca, Colima and Guerrero, in western slopes in oak, oak-pine and tropical subdeciduous forests at elevations of 750 to 1300 meters.

== Physical description ==
This orchid is a cool to warm growing epiphyte with oval, strongly ribbed, pseudobulbs. These are pod-like formations, underneath the orchid's leaves, which store nutrients and water, to adapt to periods of drought. Stanhopea pseudoradiosas have single, leathery, leaves, shaped like narrow ovals, tapering at the end, with a short sharp point. The leaf has a leafstalk, called a petiole, and is plicate (leaf looks folded/like a fan). It has loosely 2 to 5 fragrant inflorescences that bloom in the summer, enveloped by spread, large, broadly triangular, acute floral bracts (leaf below flower). The flower size is 2 to 2.2 inches [5 to 5.5 cm].
