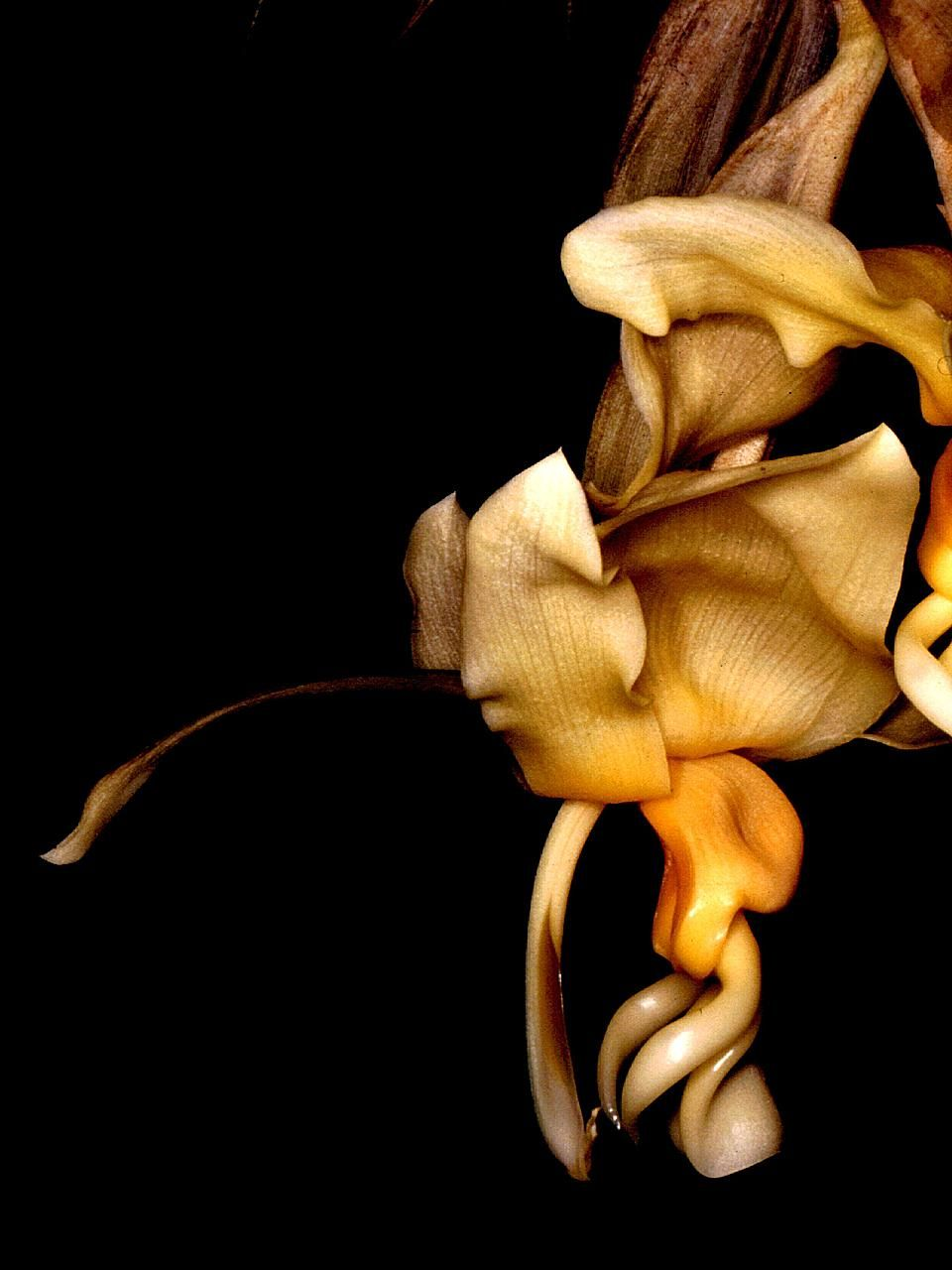
- Stanhopea intermedia flower

Scientific classification
- Kingdom: Plantae
- Clade: Tracheophytes
- Clade: Angiosperms
- Clade: Monocots
- Order: Asparagales
- Family: Orchidaceae
- Subfamily: Epidendroideae
- Genus: Stanhopea
- Species: S. intermedia

Binomial name
- Stanhopea intermedia Klinge

= Stanhopea intermedia =

Species of orchid

Stanhopea intermedia is a species of orchid - endemic to southwestern Mexico.
