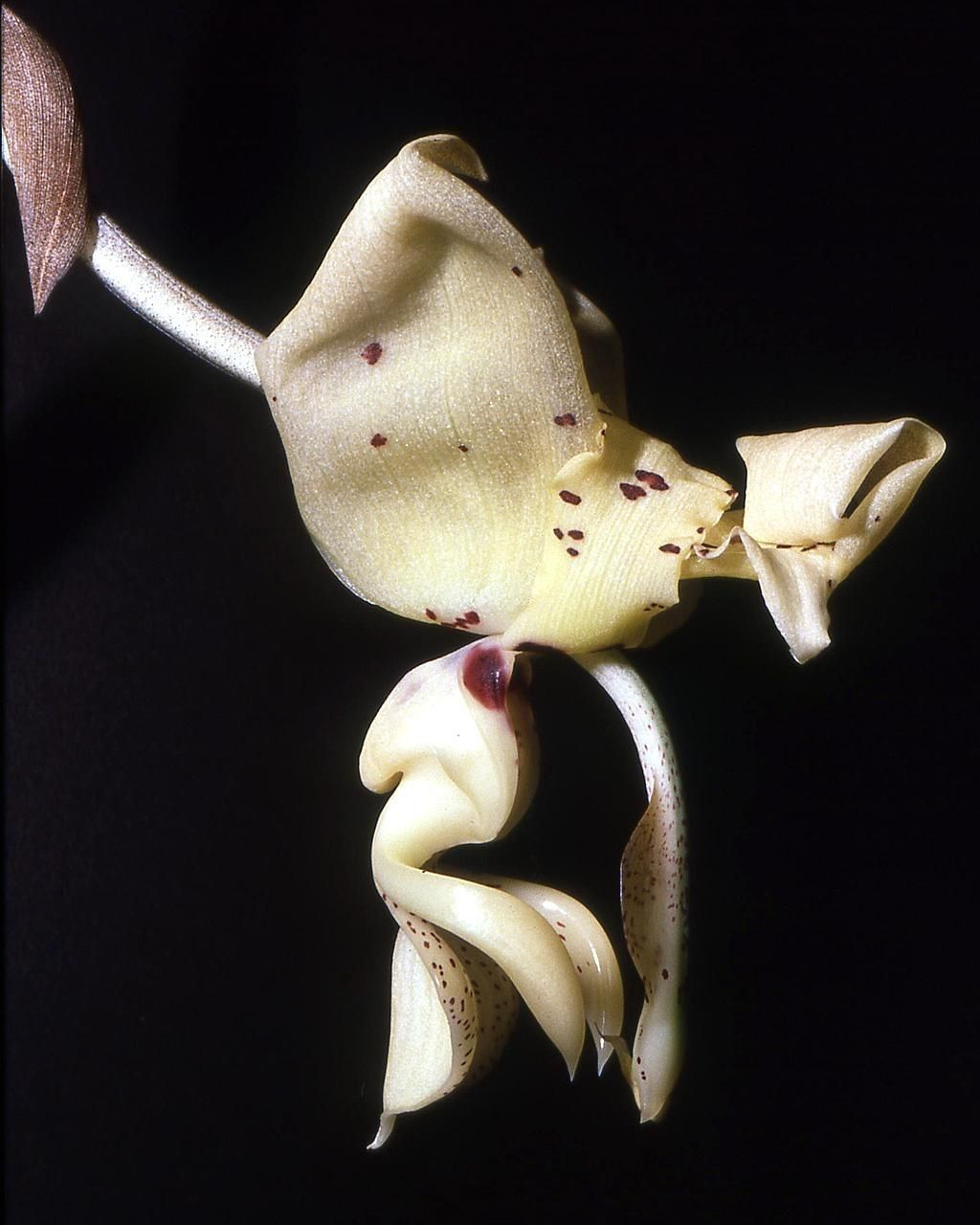
- Stanhopea xytriophora flower

Scientific classification
- Kingdom: Plantae
- Clade: Tracheophytes
- Clade: Angiosperms
- Clade: Monocots
- Order: Asparagales
- Family: Orchidaceae
- Subfamily: Epidendroideae
- Genus: Stanhopea
- Species: S. xytriophora

Binomial name
- Stanhopea xytriophora Rchb.f.

Synonyms
- Stanhopea vasquezii Dodson

= Stanhopea xytriophora =

Species of plant

Stanhopea xytriophora is a species of orchid found from southern Peru to Bolivia.
