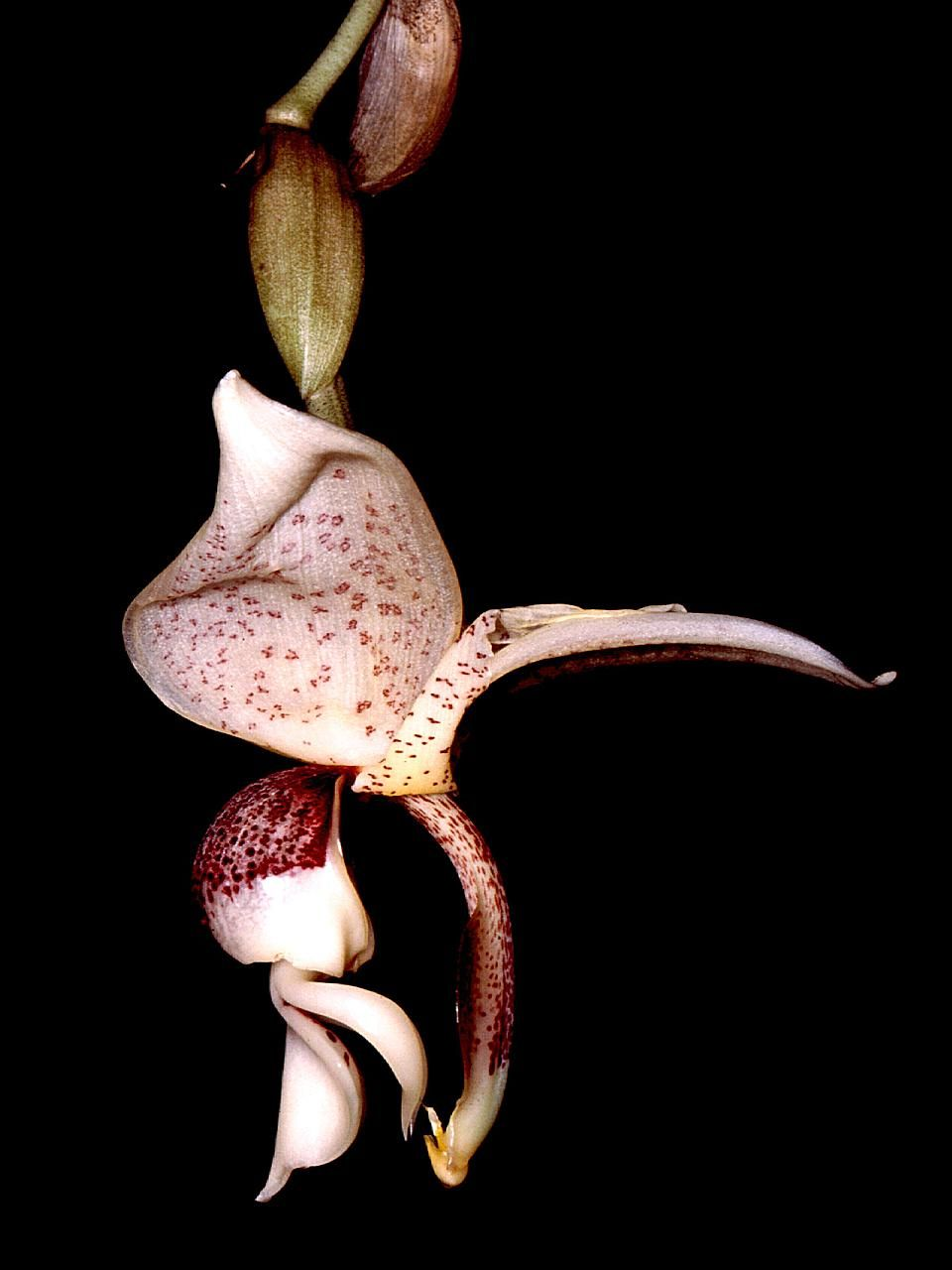
- Stanhopea insignis

Scientific classification
- Kingdom: Plantae
- Clade: Tracheophytes
- Clade: Angiosperms
- Clade: Monocots
- Order: Asparagales
- Family: Orchidaceae
- Subfamily: Epidendroideae
- Tribe: Cymbidieae
- Subtribe: Stanhopeinae
- Genus: Stanhopea; J. Frost ex Hook. 1829

Type species
- Stanhopea insignis J.Frost ex Hook.

Synonyms
- Ceratochilus Lindl. ex G.Lodd 1829, illegitimate homonym not Blume 1825; Stanhopeastrum Rchb.f.; Gerlachia Szlach.; Tadeastrum Szlach.

= Stanhopea =

Genus of orchids

Stanhopea is a genus of the orchid family (Orchidaceae) from Central and South America. The abbreviation used in horticultural trade is Stan. The genus is named for Philip Henry Stanhope, 4th Earl Stanhope (1781–1855), who was the president of the Medico-Botanical Society of London in 1829–1837. It comprises 55 species and 5 natural hybrids. The orchids in the genus are mostly epiphytic (growing on other plants), but occasionally terrestrial. They can be found in damp forests from Mexico to Trinidad to northwestern Argentina. Their ovate pseudobulbs carry from the top one long, plicate, elliptic leaf.

Stanhopea is noted for its complex and usually fragrant flowers that are generally spectacular and short-lived. Their pendant inflorescences are noted for flowering out of the bottom of the containers in which they grow, lending themselves to culture in baskets that have enough open space for the inflorescence to push through. They are sometimes called upside-down orchids.

The majority of species are robust plants that grow readily in cultivation. For relatives of Stanhopea see Stanhopeinae and the closely related sister subtribe Coeliopsidinae.

== Description ==
Most Stanhopea flowers flash prominent, elegant horns on the epichile. The exception are the species; S. annulata, S. avicula, S. cirrhata, S. ecornuta and S. pulla. A second group have short or truncated horns, they include the species; S. candida, S. grandiflora, S. reichenbachiana, S. tricornis and the natural hybrid S. x herrenhusana. The structure of the labellum of this group is in general, not as complex as other members of the genus.

With most Stanhopea flowers lasting three days or less, the flowers must attract pollinators very quickly. These chemical attractants are generated in the hypochile, attracting the male euglossine bees to the flower. These male euglossine bees are known to be important pollinators of Stanhopea flowers, collecting fragrances at these flowers over their lifetime and storing them in their hind tibia. Bees in the Euglossini tribe, including Eulaema meriana, are known to pollinate these flowers supposedly because the orchids can deceptively mimic the form of a female and her sex pheromone. When the bee touches down on the flower, a great effort is made to collect chemical scent - he eventually slides on the waxy surface of the hypochile, gliding down on the slippery lip to exit the flower. The long column is touched in the process, resulting in the bee taking up pollinia at the very tip of the column. When the bee slides down another flower, the pollinia are deposited on the sticky surface of the stigma.

== Species ==
Stanhopea tigrina

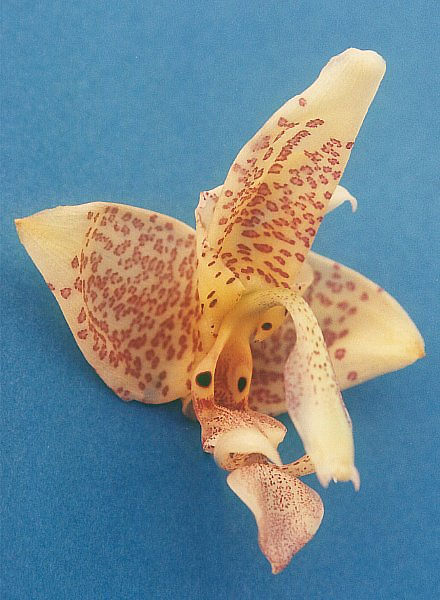
Stanhopea oculata

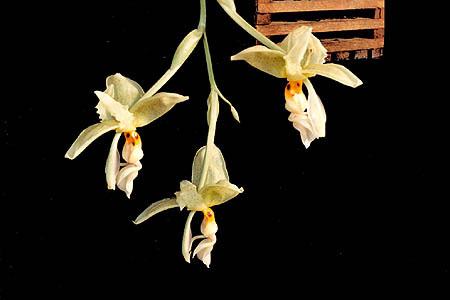
Stanhopea ruckeri

- Stanhopea aliceae Pérez-García, Chiron & Szlach. (Guatemala)
- Stanhopea anfracta Rolfe (SE. Ecuador to Bolivia)
- Stanhopea annulata Mansf. (S. Colombia to Ecuador)
- Stanhopea avicula Dressler (Panama)
- Stanhopea bueraremensis Campacci & Marçal (E. Brazil)
- Stanhopea candida Barb.Rodr. (S. Trop. America)
- Stanhopea cephalopodaa Archila, Pérez-García, Chiron & Szlach. (Guatemala)
- Stanhopea chironii Archila, Pérez-García & Szlach. (Guatemala)
- Stanhopea cirrhata Lindl. (C. America)
- Stanhopea confusa G.Gerlach & Beeche (C. America)
- Stanhopea connata Klotzsch (Colombia to Peru)
- Stanhopea costaricensis Rchb.f. (C. America)
- Stanhopea deltoidea Lem. (Peru to Bolivia)
- Stanhopea dodsoniana Salazar & Soto Arenas (NC. & S. Mexico to Guatemala)
- Stanhopea ecornuta Lem. (C. America)
- Stanhopea embreei Dodson (Ecuador)
- Stanhopea florida Rchb.f. (Ecuador to Peru)
- Stanhopea fonsecae Archila, Pérez-García, Chiron & Szlach. (Guatemala)
- Stanhopea frymirei Dodson (Ecuador)
- Stanhopea gibbosa Rchb.f. (= S. carchiensis, = S. impressa; S Colombia to Ecuador)
- Stanhopea grandiflora Lindl. (Trinidad to S. Trop. America)
- Stanhopea graveolens Lindl.(Mexico to C. America, Brazil to NW. Argentina)
- Stanhopea greeri Jenny (Peru)
- Stanhopea guttulata Lindl. (SE. Brazil)
- Stanhopea haseloffiana Rchb.f. (N. Peru)
- Stanhopea hernandezii (Kunth) Schltr. (C. & SW. Mexico)
- Stanhopea insignis J.Frost ex Hook. (SE. & S. Brazil)
- Stanhopea intermedia Klinge (SW. Mexico)
- Stanhopea javieri Archila, Pérez-García, Chiron & Szlach. (Guatemala)
- Stanhopea jenischiana F.Kramer ex Rchb.f.(Colombia to NW. Venezuela and S. Ecuador)
- Stanhopea lietzei (Regel) Schltr. (E. & S. Brazil)
- Stanhopea macrocornata Archila, Pérez-García, Chiron & Szlach. (Guatemala)
- Stanhopea maculosa Knowles & Westc. (W. Mexico)
- Stanhopea madouxiana Cogn. (Colombia)
- Stanhopea maduroi Dodson & Dressler (Panama to N.Colombia)
- Stanhopea manriqueii Jenny & Nauray (Peru)
- Stanhopea marizana Jenny (Peru)
- Stanhopea martiana Bateman ex Lindl. (SW. Mexico)
- Stanhopea marylenae Archila, Chiron & Pérez-García (Guatemala)
- Stanhopea moliana Rolfe (Peru)
- Stanhopea napoensis Dodson (Ecuador)
- Stanhopea naurayi Jenny (Peru)
- Stanhopea nicaraguensis G.Gerlach (Nicaragua)
- Stanhopea nigripes Rolfe (Peru)
- Stanhopea novogaliciana S.Rosillo (Mexico - Nayarit, Jalisco)
- Stanhopea oculata (Lodd.)Lindl. (Mexico to Colombia, SE. Brazil)
- Stanhopea oscarrodrigoi Archila, Pérez-García, Chiron & Szlach. (Guatemala)
- Stanhopea ospinae Dodson (Colombia)
- Stanhopea panamensis N.H.Williams & W.M.Whitten (Panama)
- Stanhopea peruviana Rolfe (Peru)
- Stanhopea platyceras Rchb.f. (Colombia)
- Stanhopea posadae Jenny et Braem (Colombia)
- Stanhopea pozoi Dodson & D.E.Benn. (S. Ecuador)
- Stanhopea pseudoradiosa Jenny & R.Gonzalez (SW. Mexico)
- Stanhopea pulla Rchb.f. (Costa Rica to N. Colombia)
- Stanhopea radiosa Lem. (W. Mexico)
- Stanhopea reichenbachiana Roezl ex Rchb.f. (Colombia)
- Stanhopea rubroatrata Archila, Pérez-García, Chiron & Szlach. (Guatemala)
- Stanhopea rubromaculata Archila, Pérez-García, Chiron & Szlach. (Guatemala)
- Stanhopea ruckeri Lindl. (= S. inodora; Mexico to C. America)
- Stanhopea saccata Bateman (Mexico - Chiapas to C. America)
- Stanhopea saintexuperyi Archila, Pérez-García, Chiron & Szlach. (Guatemala)
- Stanhopea schilleriana Rchb.f. (Colombia)
- Stanhopea shuttleworthii Rchb.f. (Colombia)
- Stanhopea stevensonii A.Mejia & R.Escobar ex Jenny (Colombia)
- Stanhopea szlachetkoana Archila, Pérez-García & Chiron (Guatemala)
- Stanhopea tigrina Bateman ex Lindl. (Mexico)
- Stanhopea tolimensis G.Gerlach (Colombia)
- Stanhopea tricornis Lindl. (W. South America)
- Stanhopea victoriana Archila, Pérez-García, Chiron & Szlach. (Guatemala)
- Stanhopea wardii Lodd. ex Lindl. (Nicaragua to Venezuela)
- Stanhopea warszewicziana Klotzsch (Costa Rica)
- Stanhopea whittenii Soto Arenas, Salazar & G.Gerlach (Mexico to Guatemala)
- Stanhopea xanthoviridea Archila, Pérez-García, Chiron & Szlach. (Guatemala)
- Stanhopea xytriophora Rchb.f. (S. Peru to Bolivia)

== Natural hybrids ==
- Stanhopea × fowlieana Jenny (S. costaricensis × S. ecornuta) (Costa Rica)
- Stanhopea × herrenhusana Jenny (S. reichenbachiana × S. tricornis) (Colombia)
- Stanhopea × horichiana Jenny (S. ecornuta × S. wardii) (Costa Rica)
- Stanhopea × lewisae Ames & Correll (S. ecornuta × S. inodora) (Guatemala)
- Stanhopea × quadricornis Lindl. (S. grandflora × S. wardii) (Colombia)
- Stanhopea × thienii Dodson (S. annulata × S. impressa) (Ecuador)

== Intergeneric hybrids ==
- × Aciopea (Acineta × Stanhopea). Aciopea Guillermo Gaviria (Acineta erythroxantha × Stanhopea wardii) was registered Nov-Dec 2004 by Guillermo Gaviria-Correa (Colombia).
  - × Aciopea is abbreviated Aip.
- × Cirrhopea (Cirrhaea × Stanhopea)
- × Coryhopea (Coryanthes × Stanhopea)
- × Stangora (Gongora × Stanhopea)
- × Stanhocycnis (Polycycnis × Stanhopea)

== Gallery ==
=== Species ===
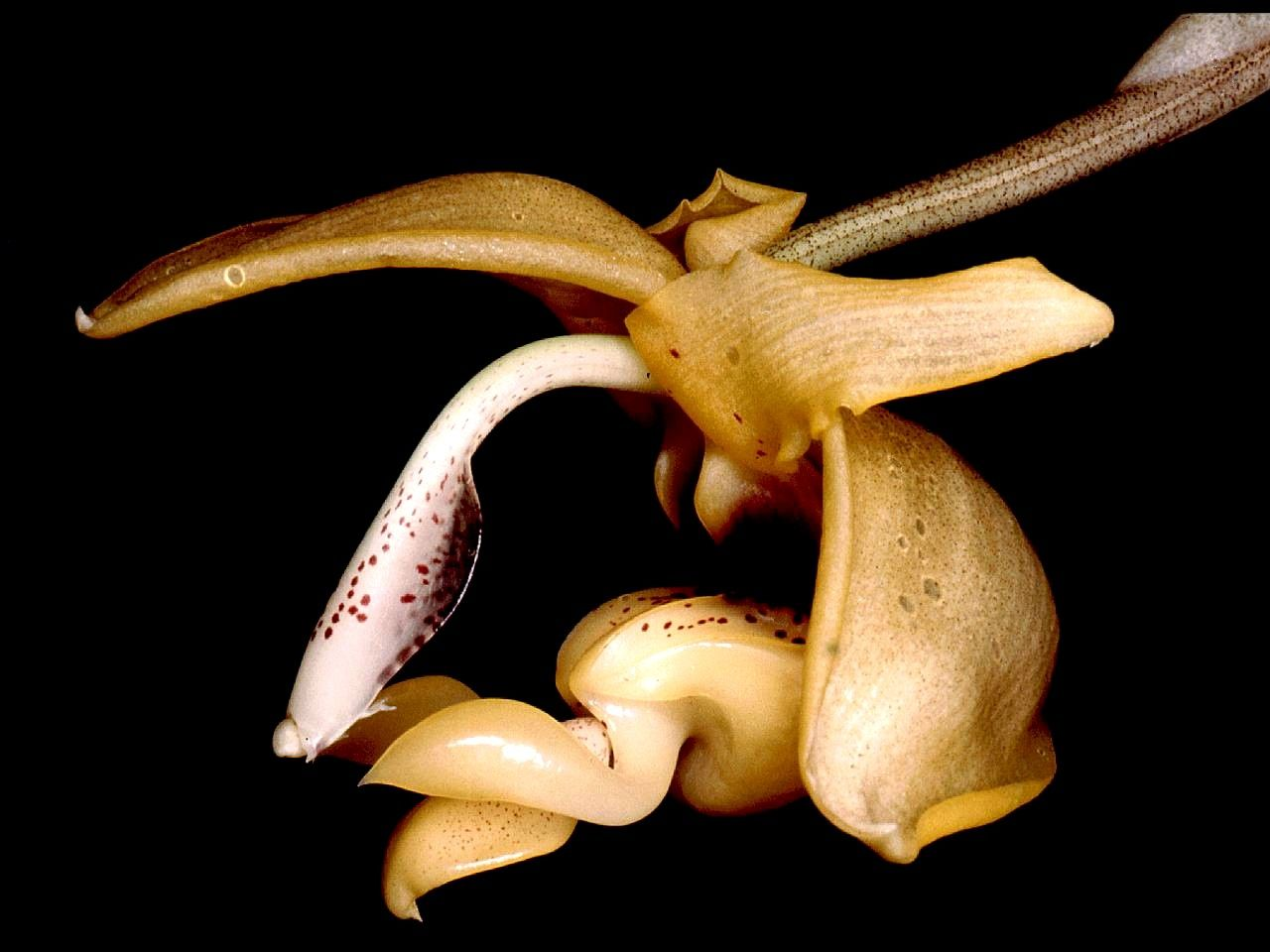
Stanhopea anfracta

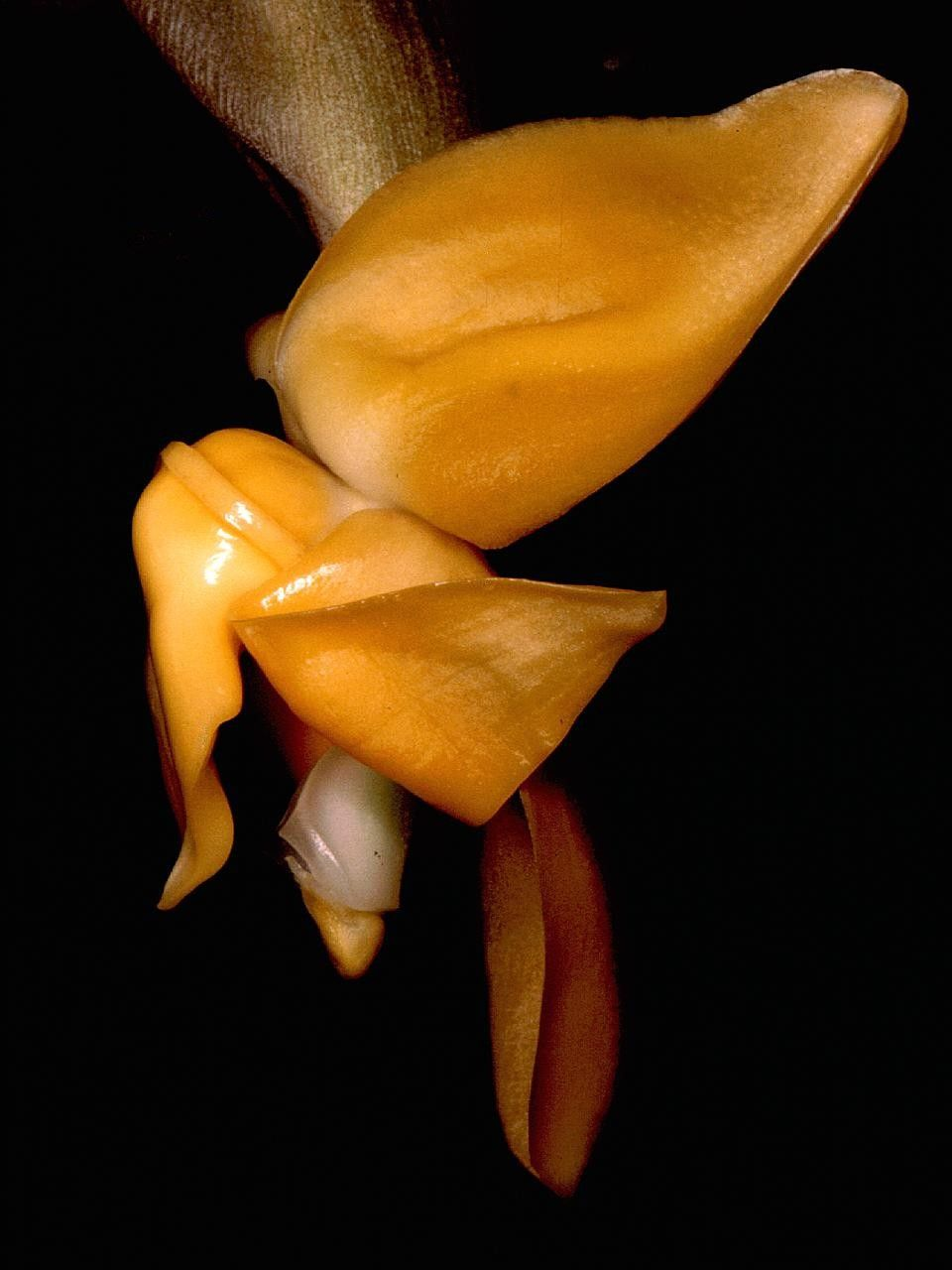
Stanhopea annulata

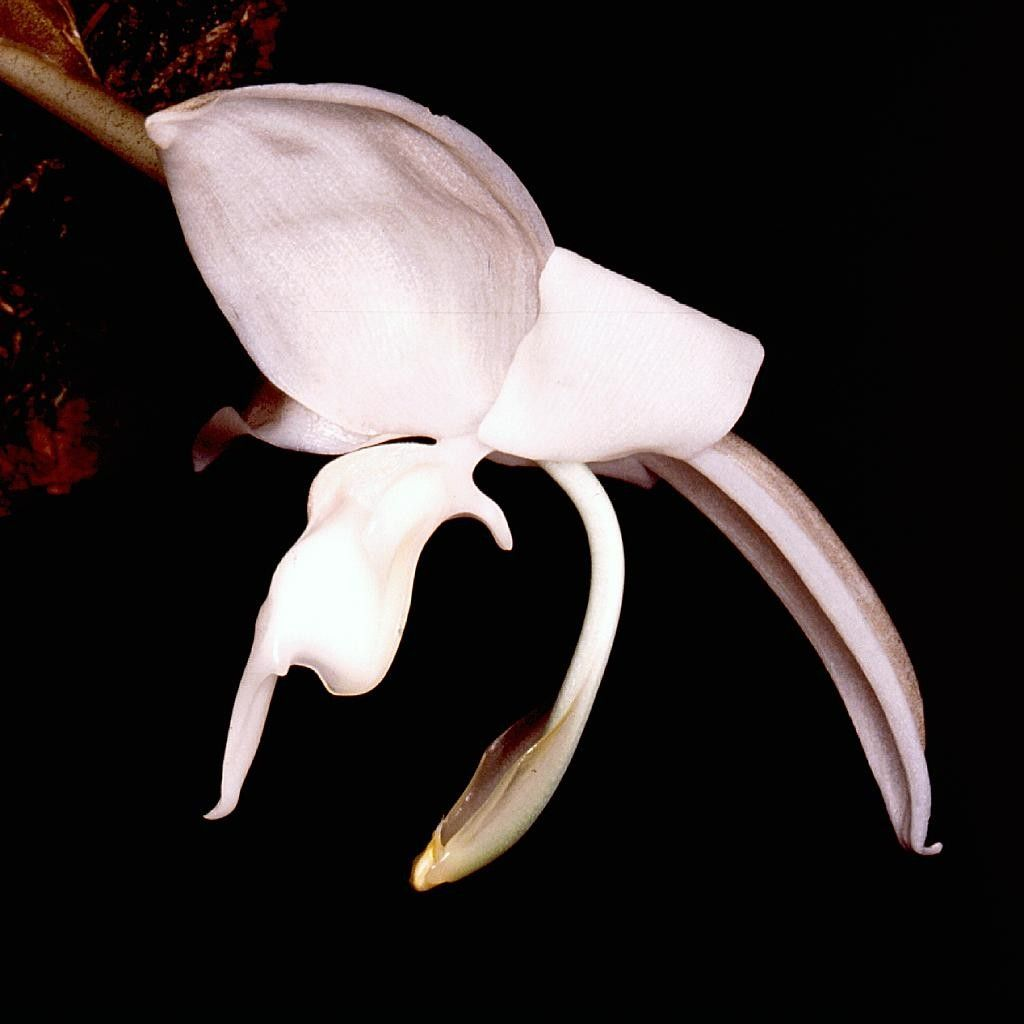
Stanhopea candida

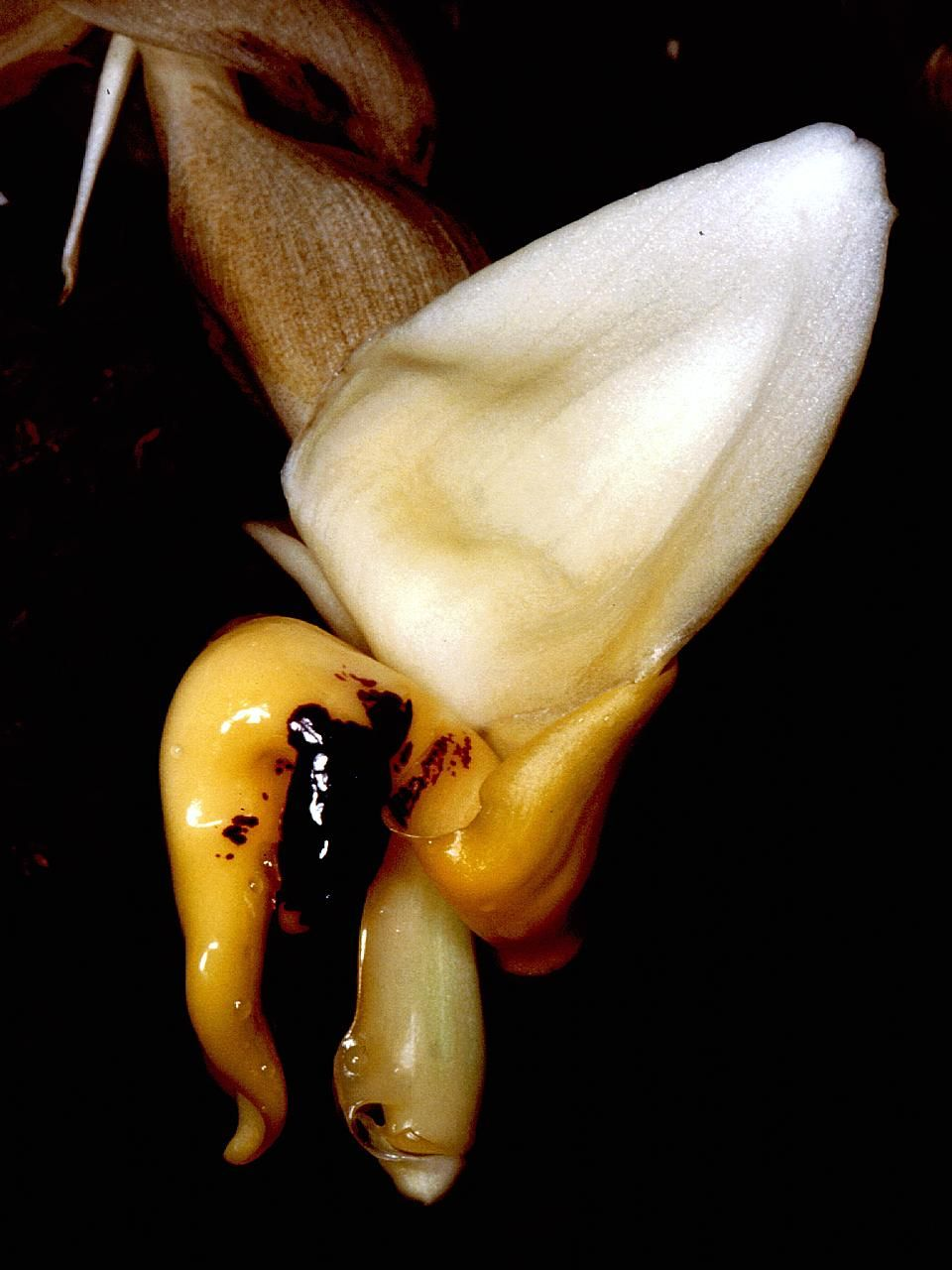
Stanhopea cirrhata

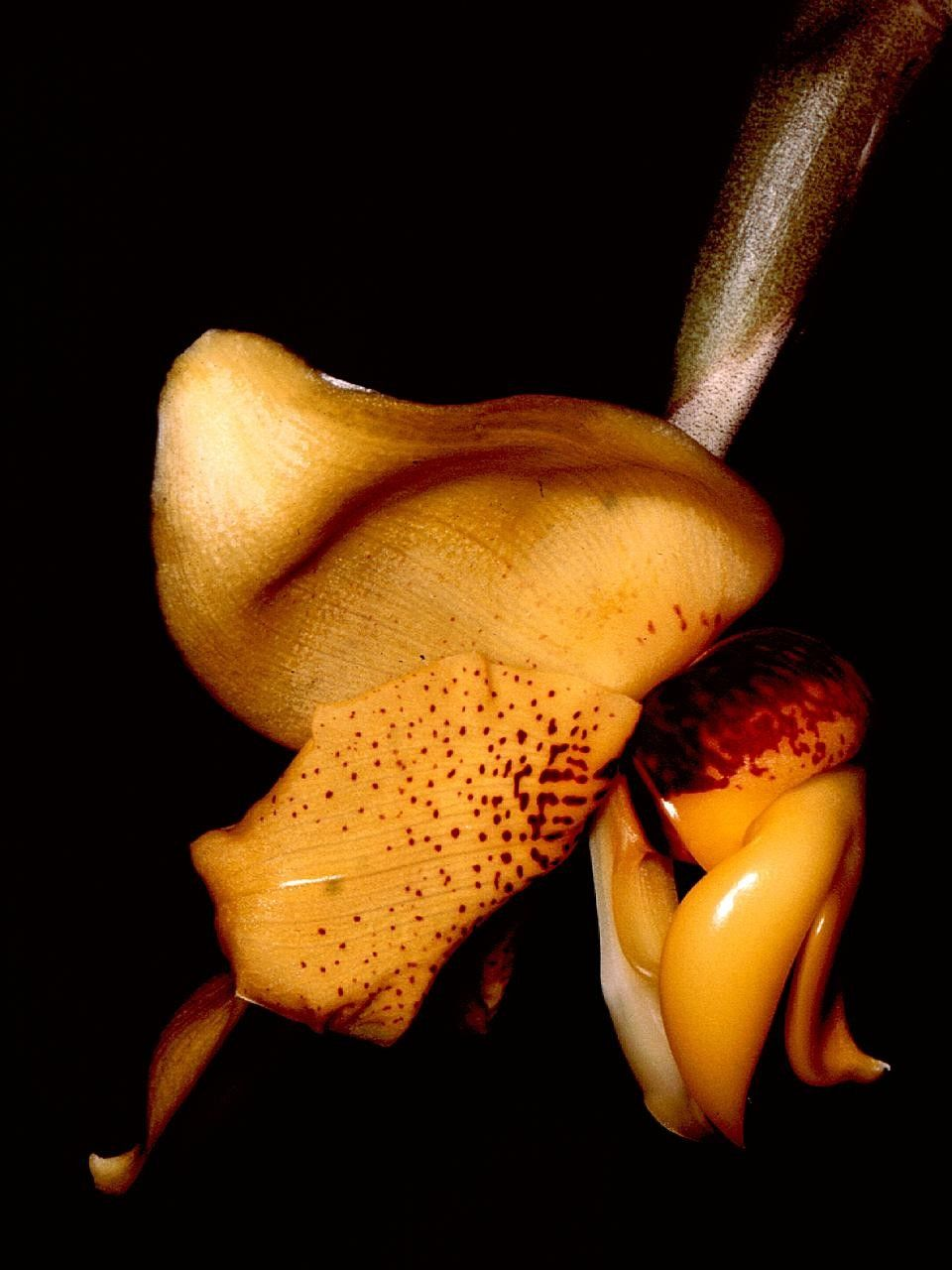
Stanhopea connata

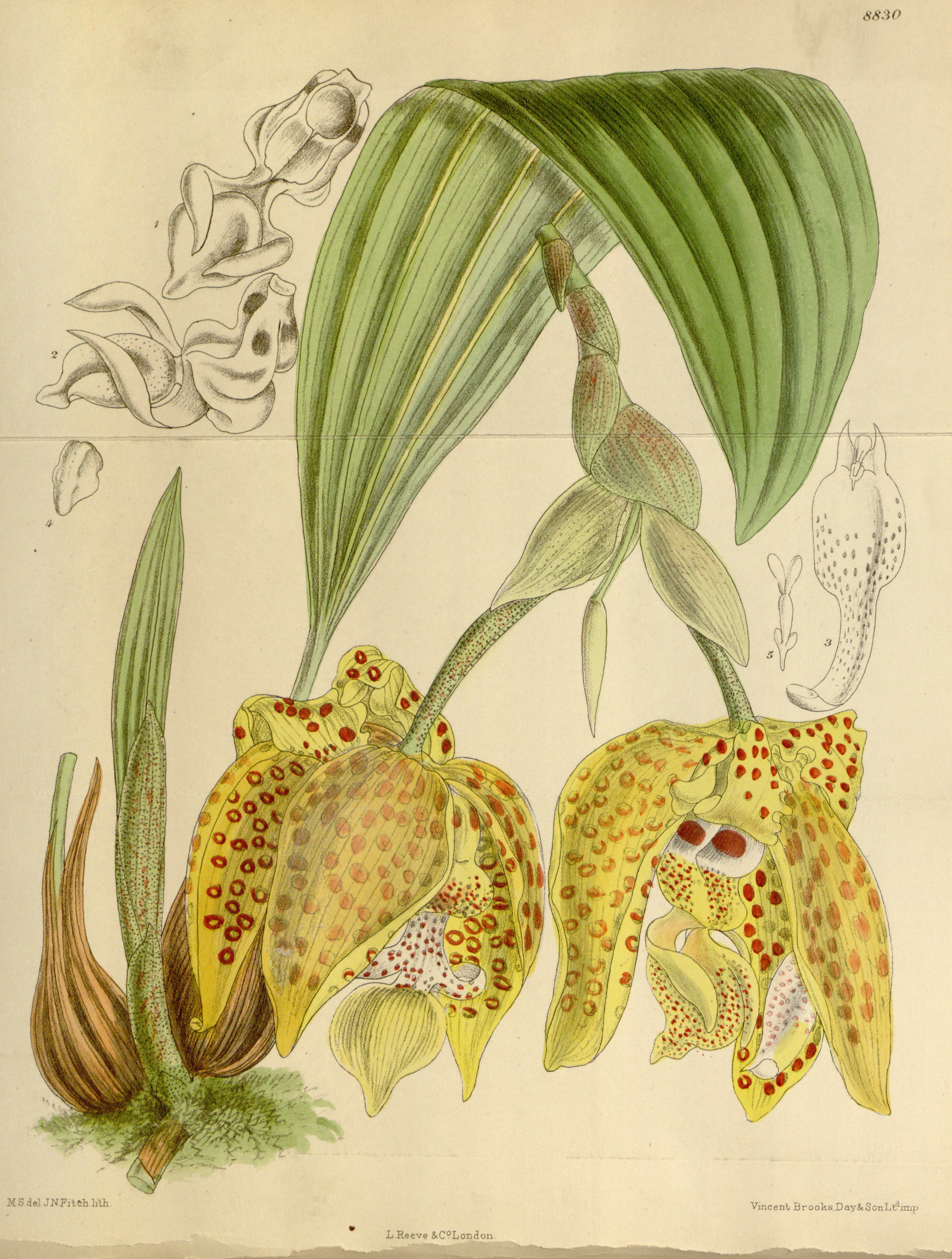
Stanhopea costaricensis

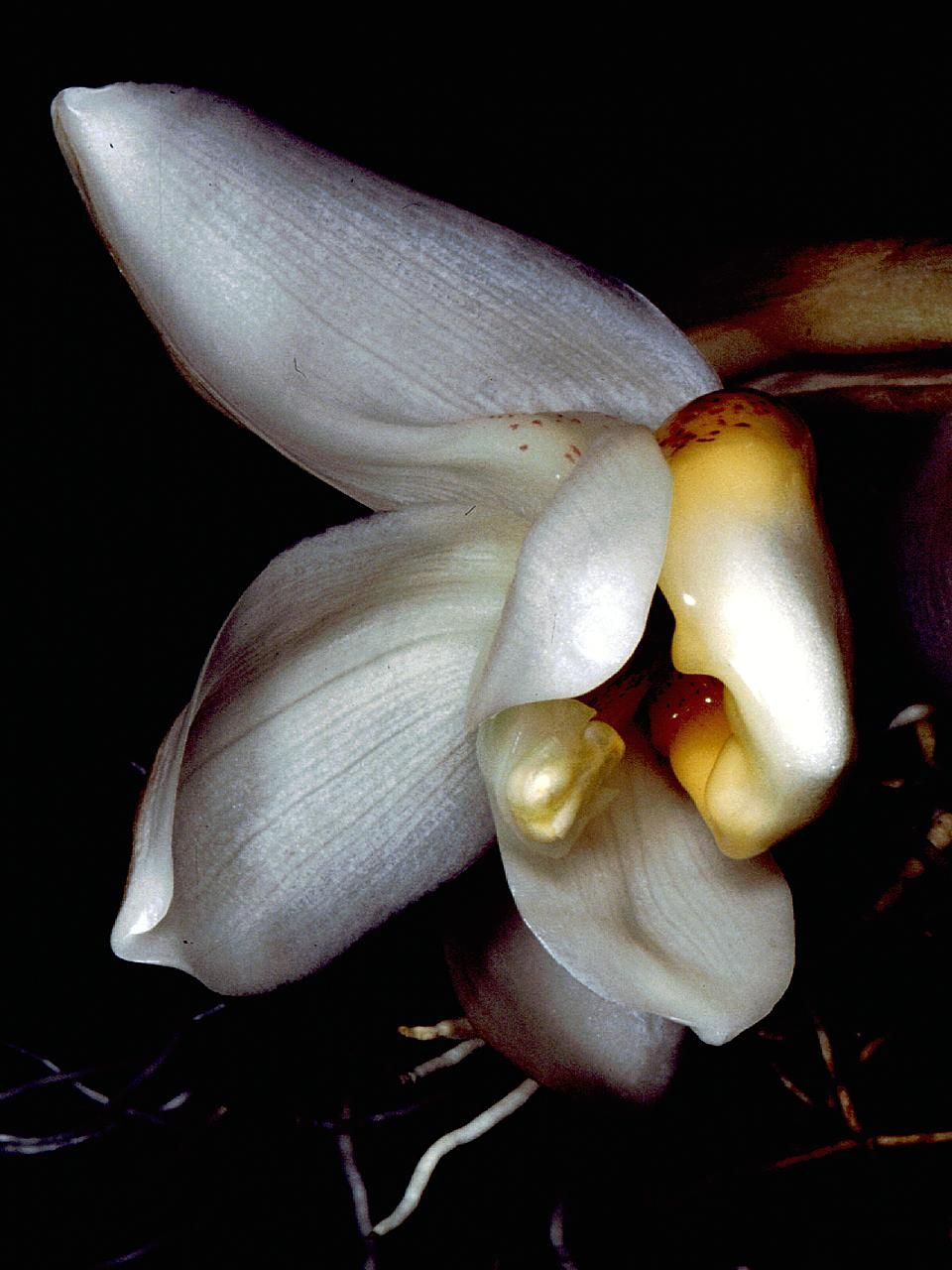
Stanhopea ecornuta

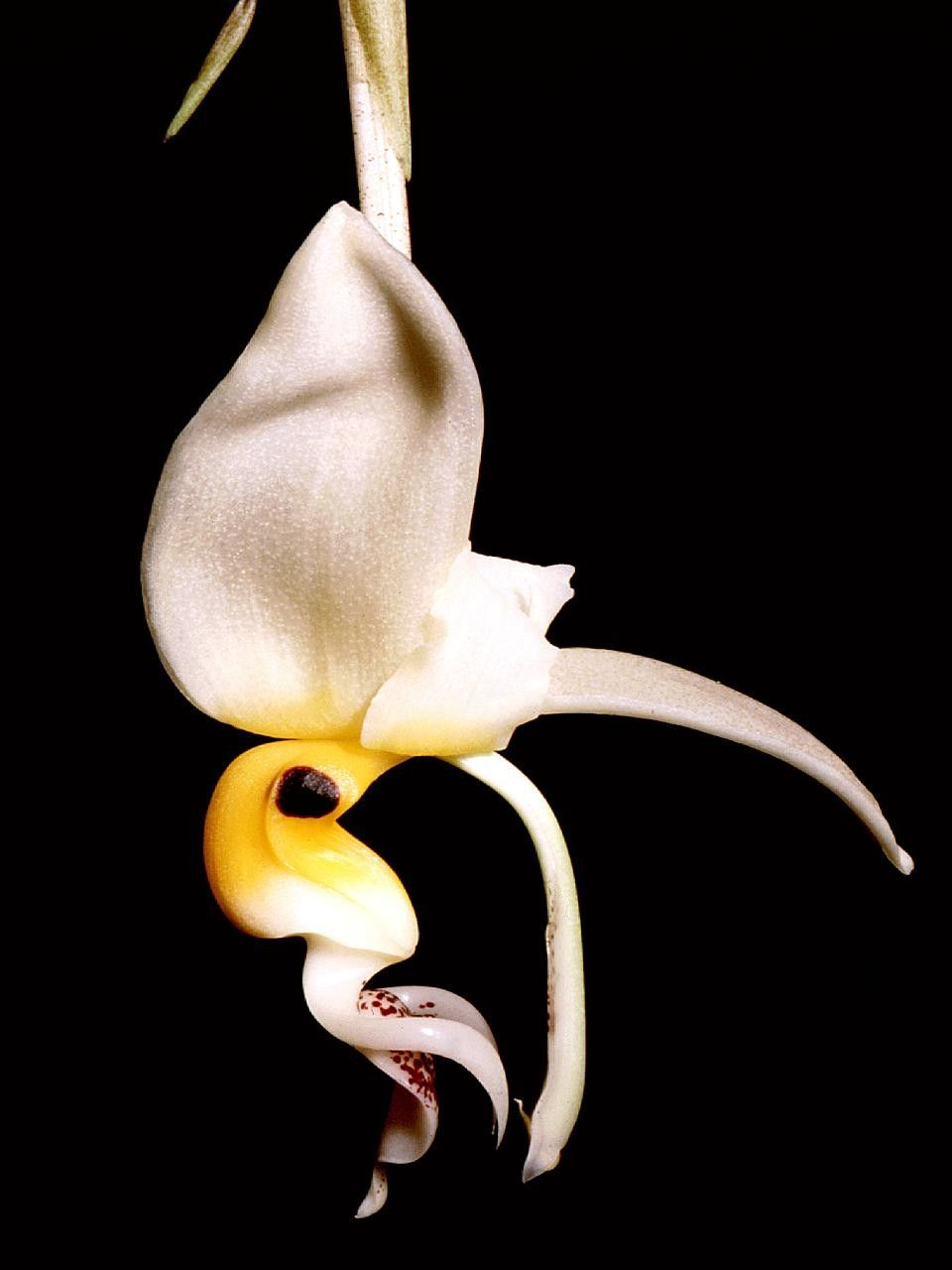
Stanhopea embreei

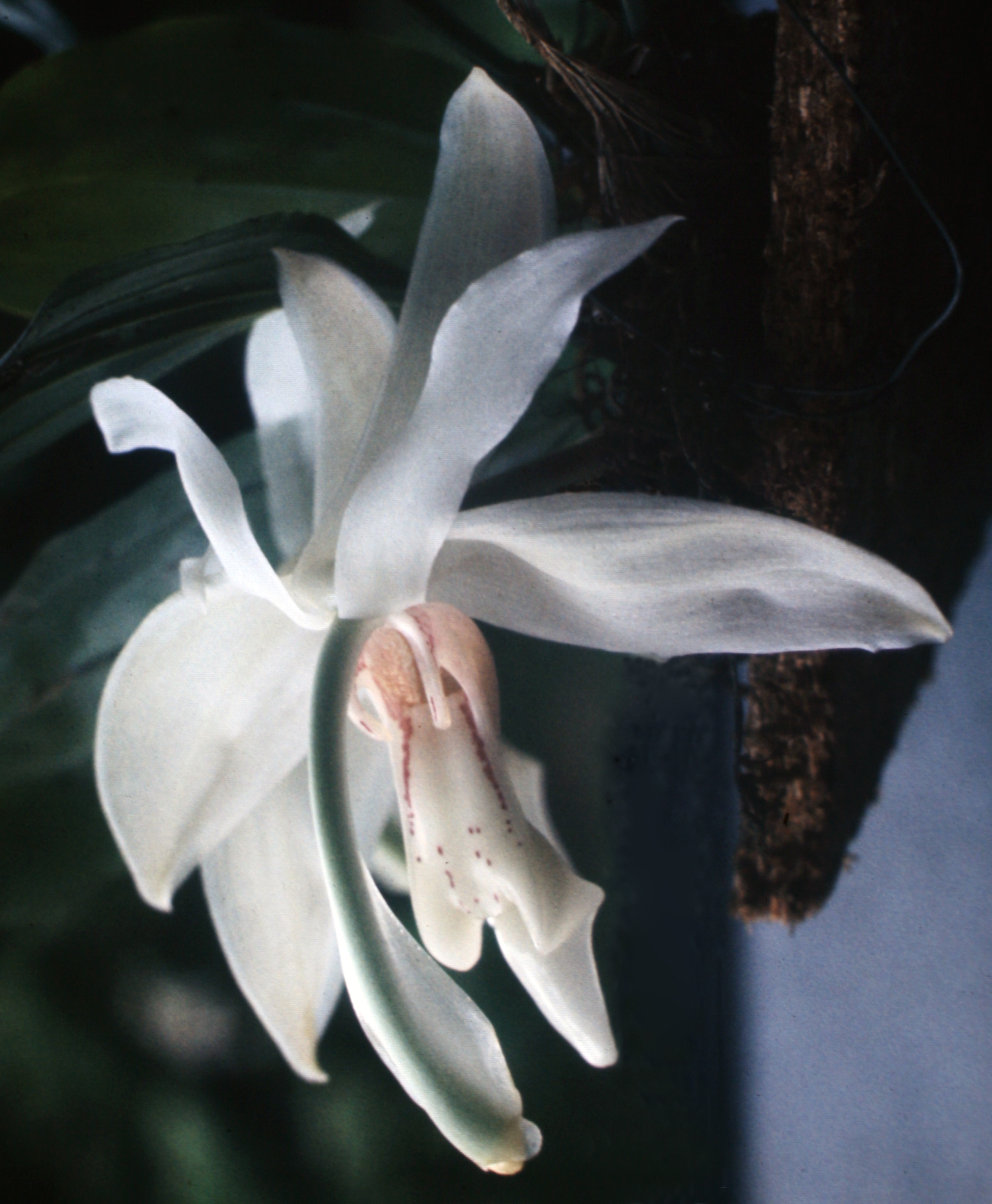
Stanhopea grandiflora

=== Natural hybrids ===
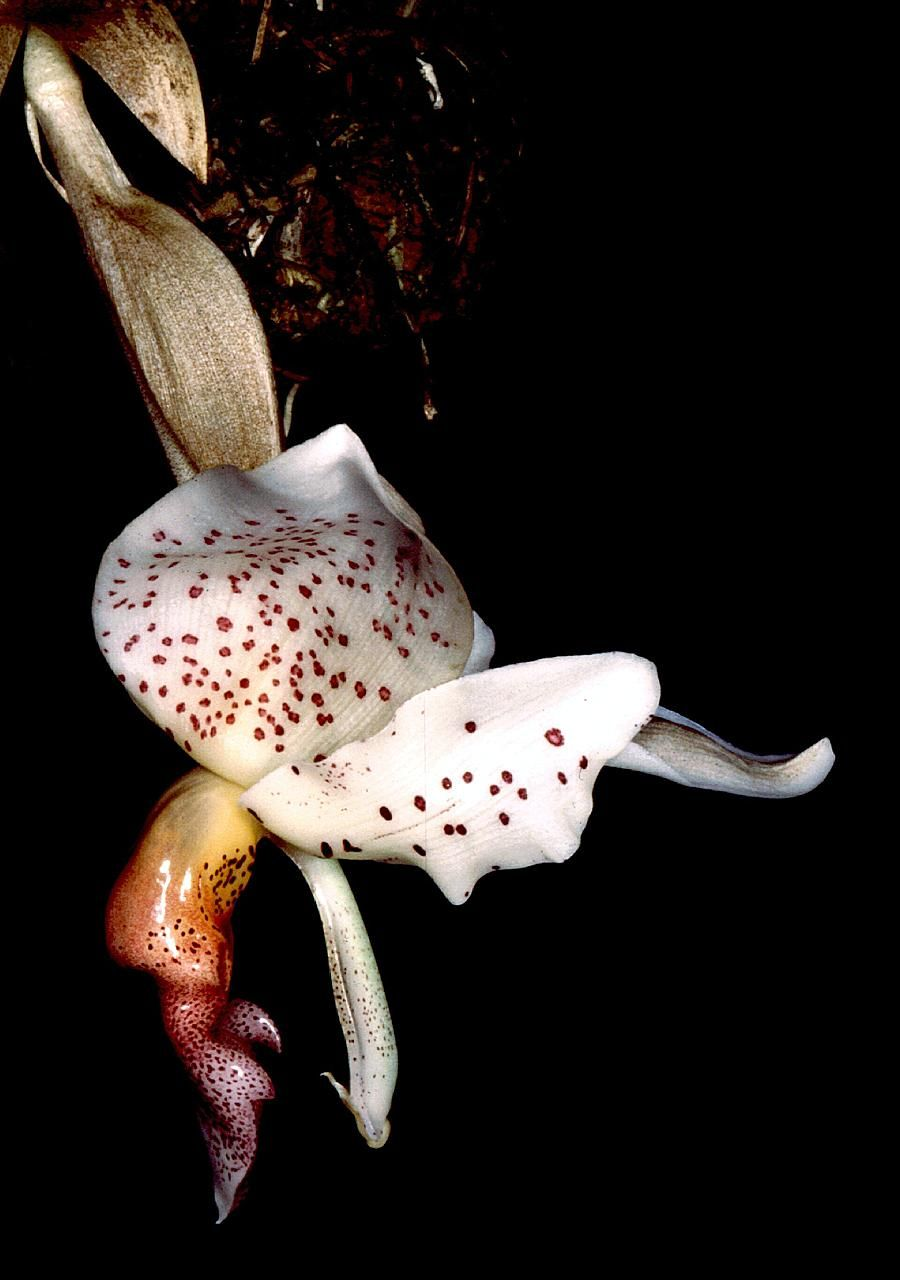
Stanhopea × horichiana
