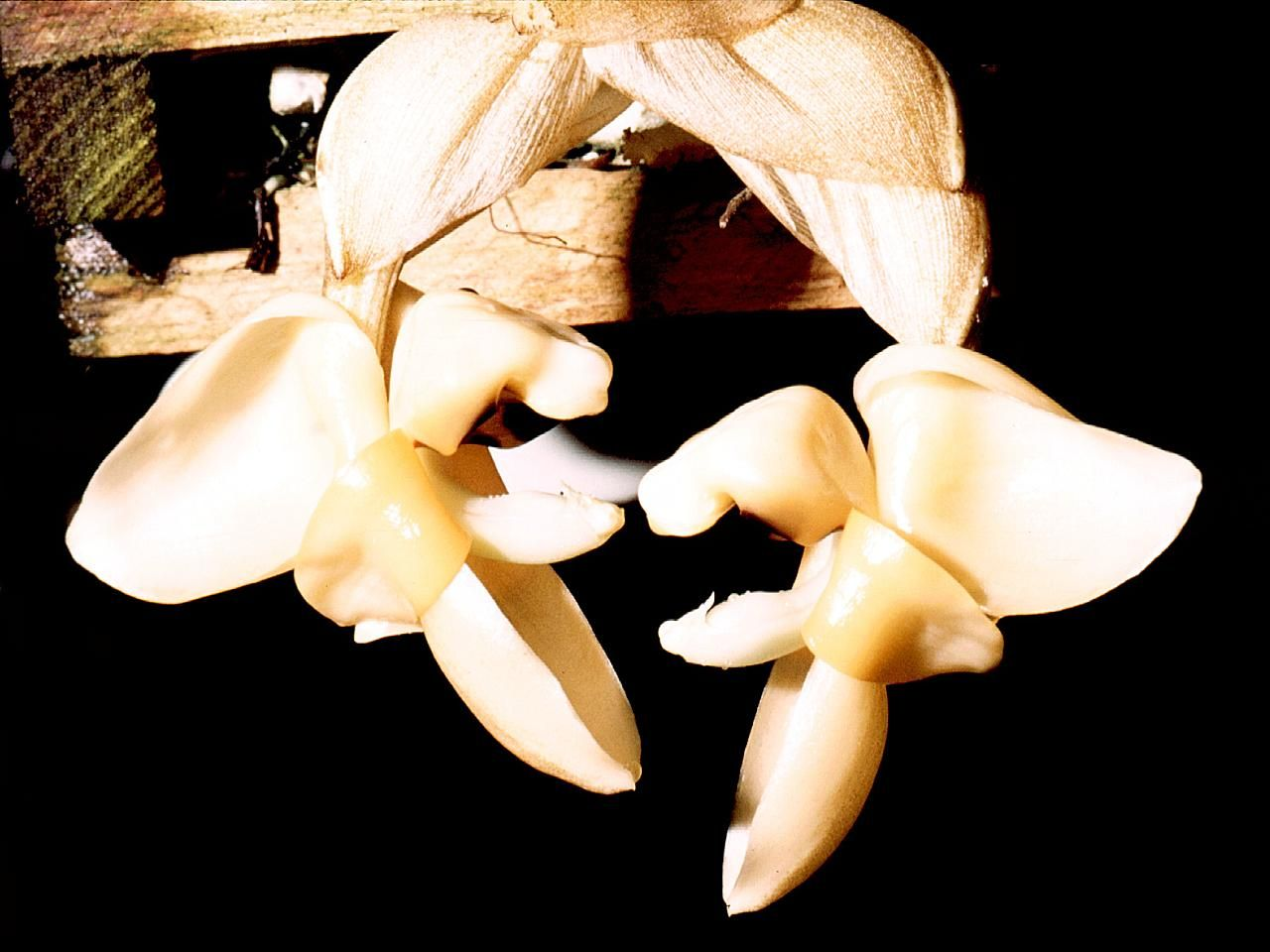
- Stanhopea pulla flower

Scientific classification
- Kingdom: Plantae
- Clade: Tracheophytes
- Clade: Angiosperms
- Clade: Monocots
- Order: Asparagales
- Family: Orchidaceae
- Subfamily: Epidendroideae
- Genus: Stanhopea
- Species: S. pulla

Binomial name
- Stanhopea pulla Rchb.f.

= Stanhopea pulla =

Species of orchid

Stanhopea pulla is a type of orchid native to Colombia, Costa Rica and Panama.
