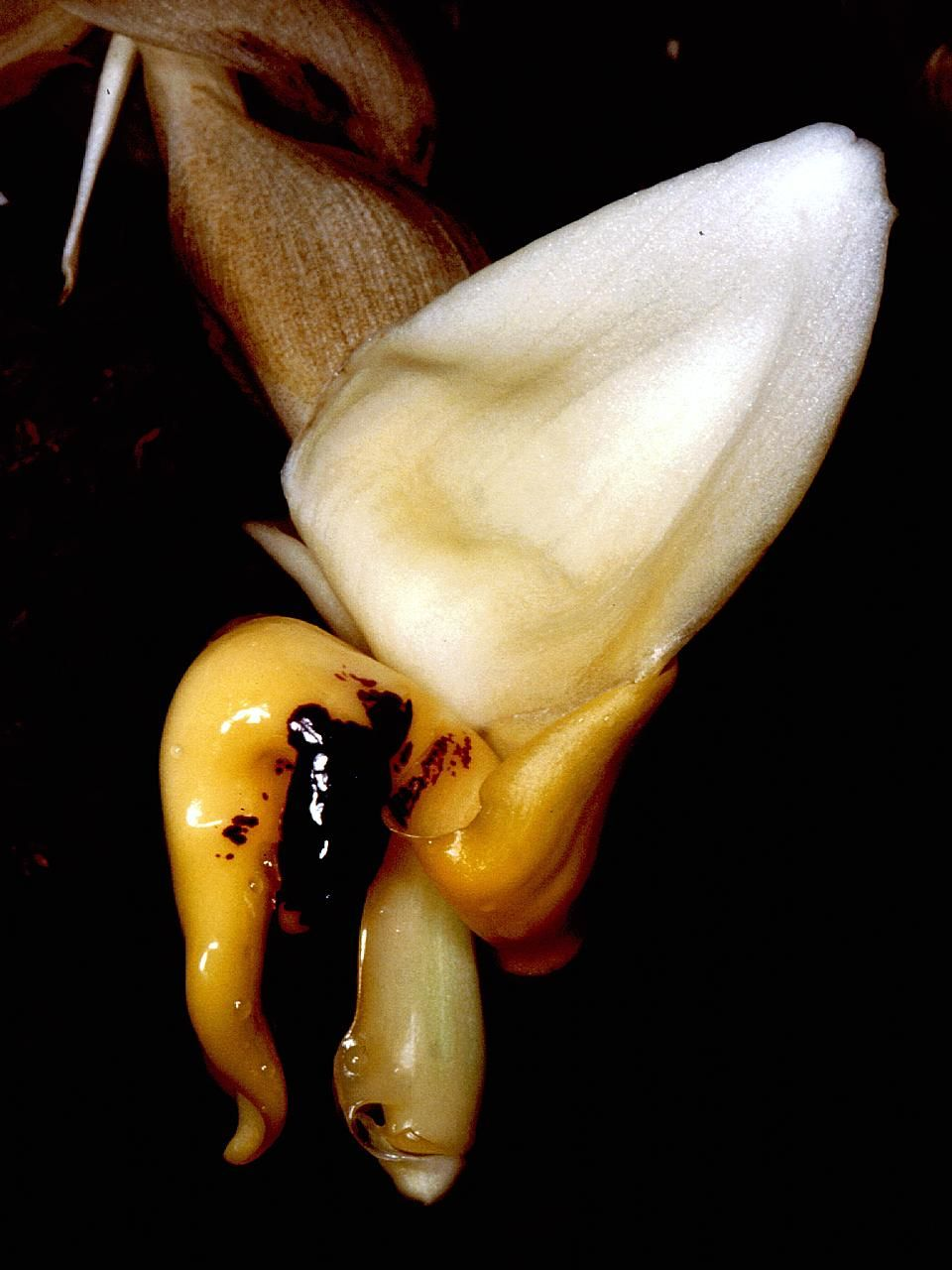
- Stanhopea cirrhata flower

Scientific classification
- Kingdom: Plantae
- Clade: Tracheophytes
- Clade: Angiosperms
- Clade: Monocots
- Order: Asparagales
- Family: Orchidaceae
- Subfamily: Epidendroideae
- Genus: Stanhopea
- Species: S. cirrhata

Binomial name
- Stanhopea cirrhata Lindl.

= Stanhopea cirrhata =

Species of orchid

Stanhopea cirrhata is a species of orchid endemic to Central America (Costa Rica, Honduras, Nicaragua and Panama).
