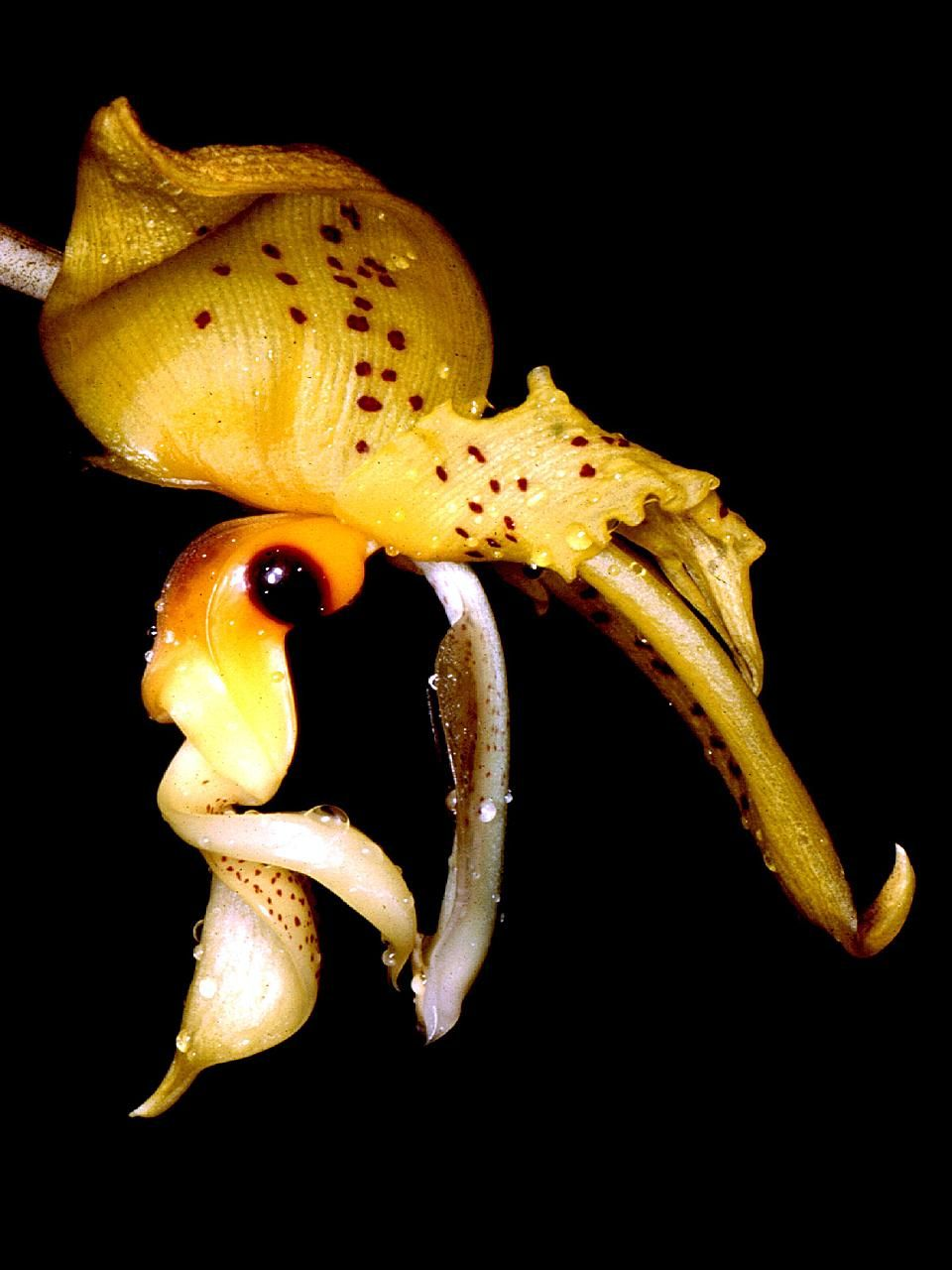
- Stanhopea wardii flower

Scientific classification
- Kingdom: Plantae
- Clade: Tracheophytes
- Clade: Angiosperms
- Clade: Monocots
- Order: Asparagales
- Family: Orchidaceae
- Subfamily: Epidendroideae
- Genus: Stanhopea
- Species: S. wardii

Binomial name
- Stanhopea wardii Lodd. ex Lindl.

Synonyms
- Stanhopea venusta Lindl.; Stanhopea aurea Lodd. ex Lindl.; Stanhopea amoena Klotzsch

= Stanhopea wardii =

Species of orchid

Stanhopea wardii is a species of orchid found from Nicaragua to Venezuela. It has been incorrectly recorded in El Salvador.
