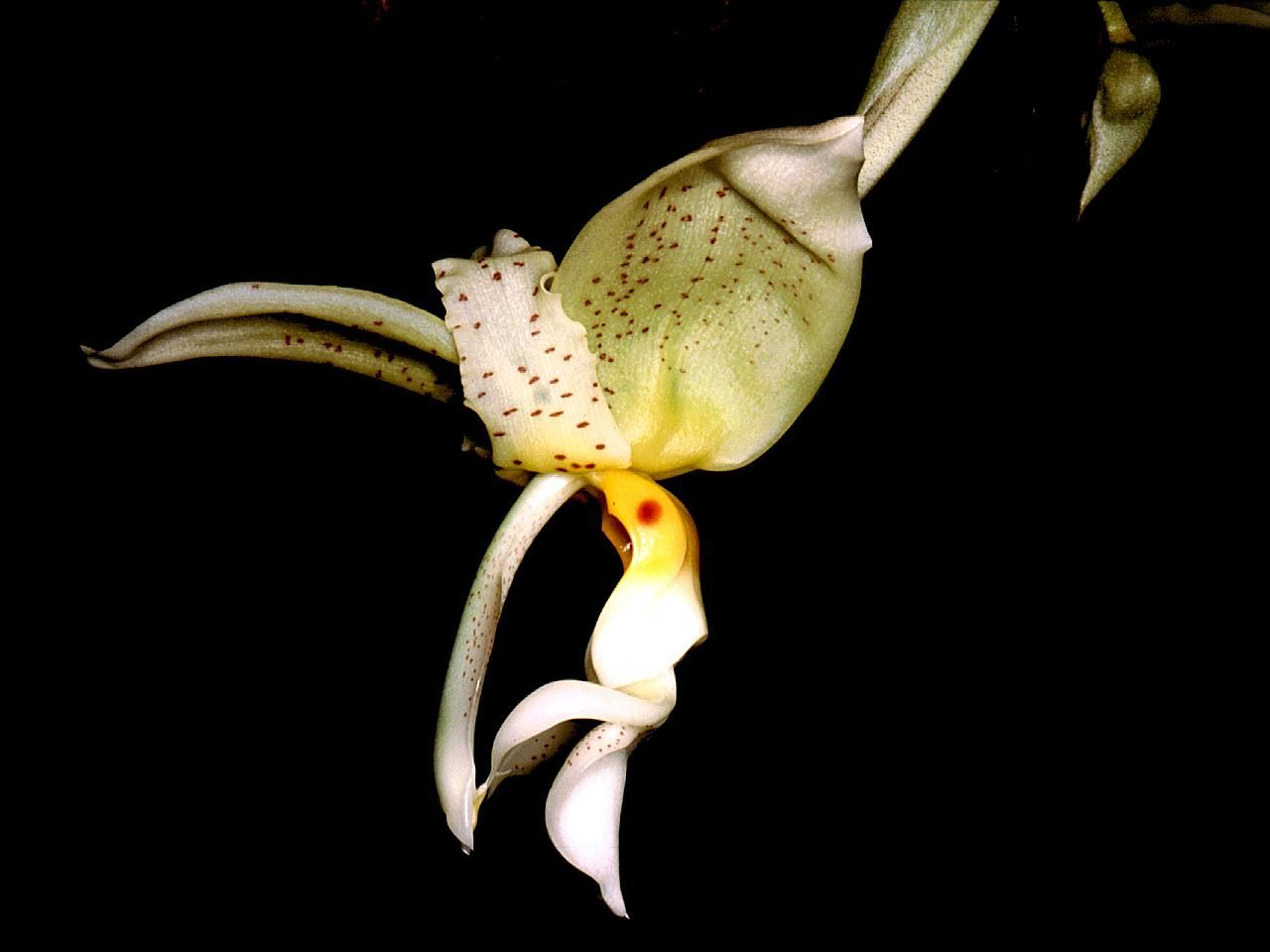
- Stanhopea ruckeri flower

Scientific classification
- Kingdom: Plantae
- Clade: Tracheophytes
- Clade: Angiosperms
- Clade: Monocots
- Order: Asparagales
- Family: Orchidaceae
- Subfamily: Epidendroideae
- Genus: Stanhopea
- Species: S. ruckeri

Binomial name
- Stanhopea ruckeri Lindl.

Synonyms
- Stanhopea inodora Lodd. ex Lindl.

= Stanhopea ruckeri =

Species of orchid

Stanhopea ruckeri is a species of orchid occurring from Mexico to Central America. There was previously some debate over the status of its synonym, Stanhopea inodora Lodd. ex Lindl..
