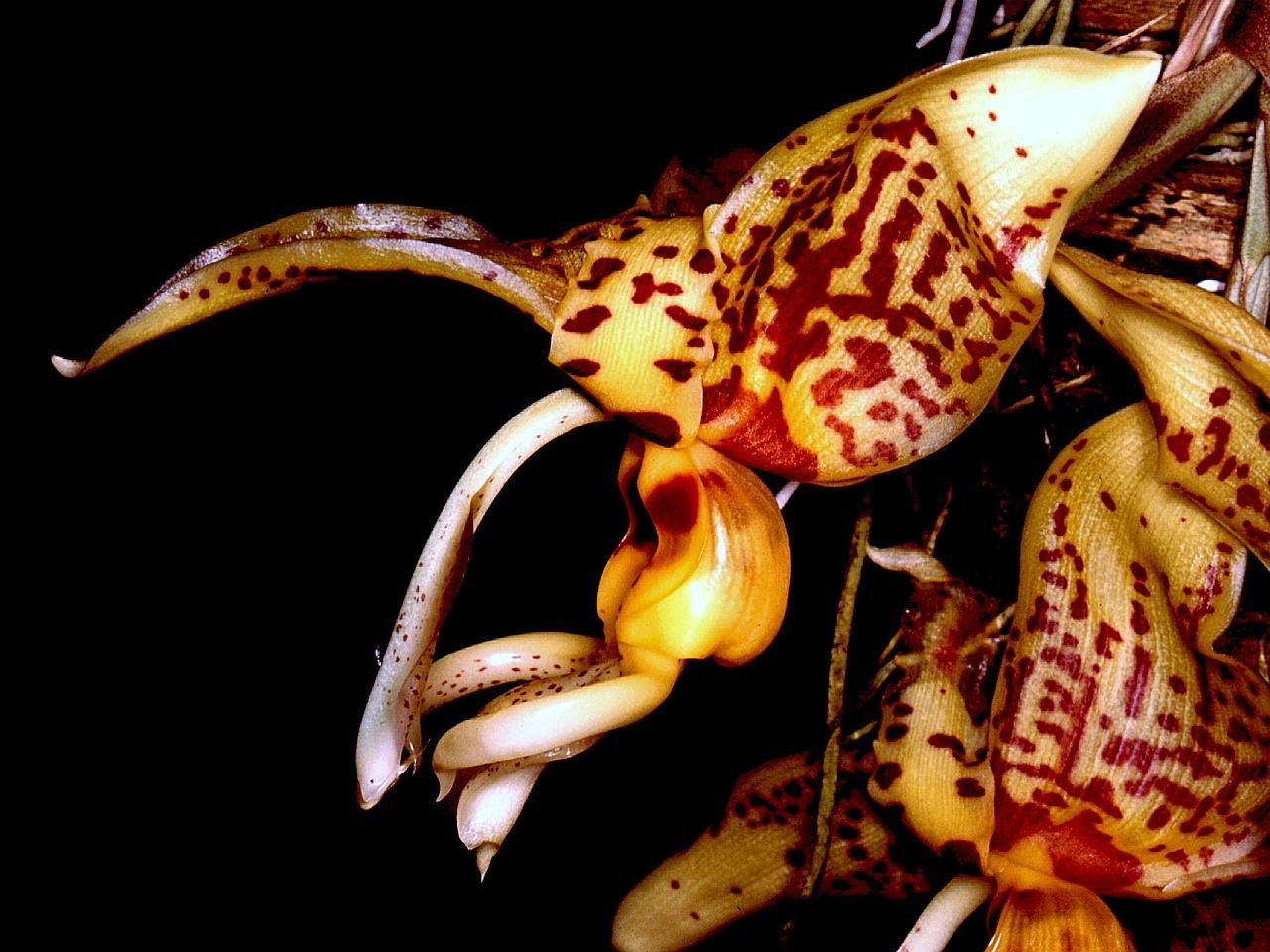
- Stanhopea shuttleworthii flower

Scientific classification
- Kingdom: Plantae
- Clade: Tracheophytes
- Clade: Angiosperms
- Clade: Monocots
- Order: Asparagales
- Family: Orchidaceae
- Subfamily: Epidendroideae
- Genus: Stanhopea
- Species: S. shuttleworthii

Binomial name
- Stanhopea shuttleworthii Rchb.f.

= Stanhopea shuttleworthii =

Species of orchid

Stanhopea shuttleworthii is a species of plant in the family Orchidaceae. It is endemic to Colombia (Tolima).
