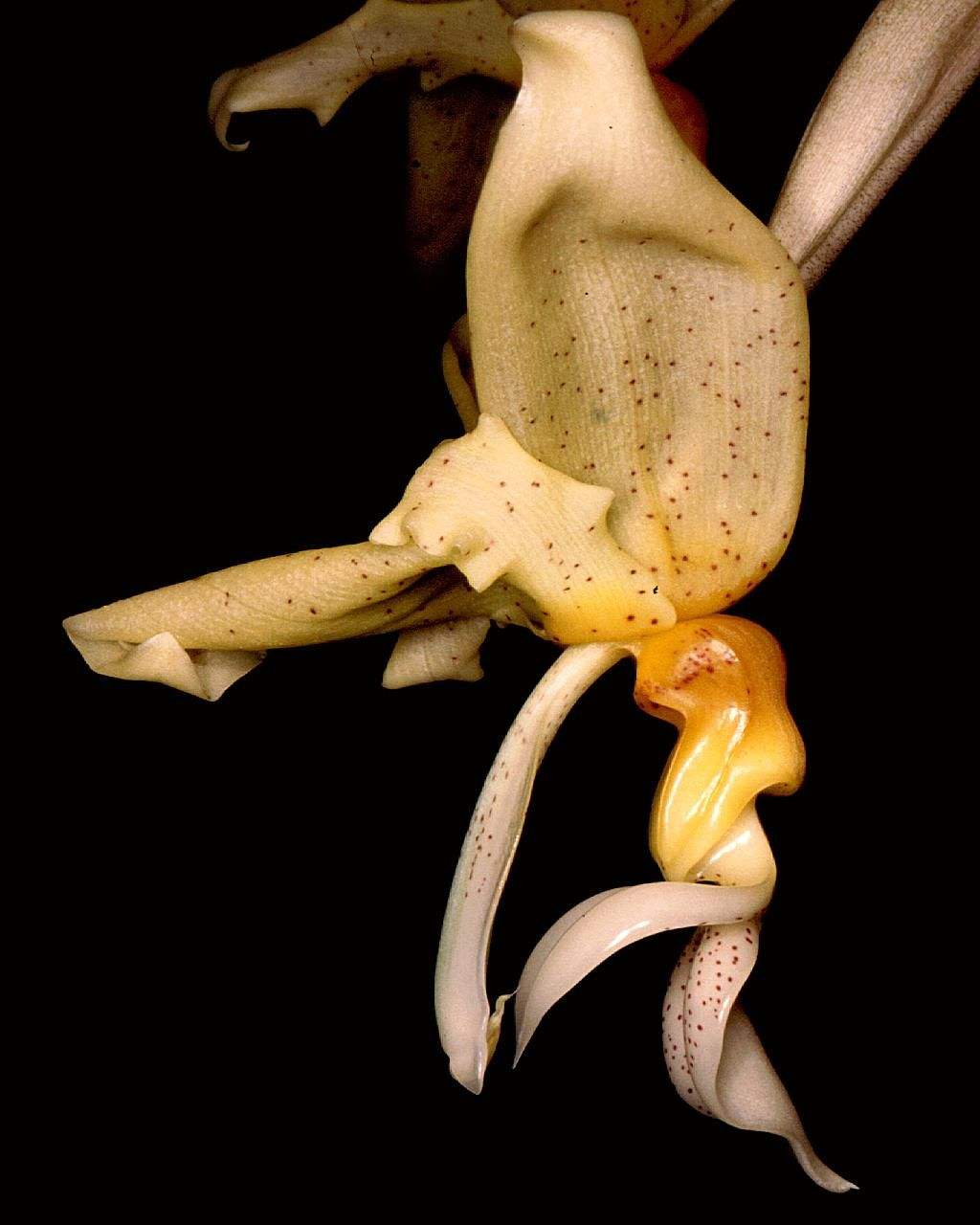
- Stanhopea graveolens flower

Scientific classification
- Kingdom: Plantae
- Clade: Tracheophytes
- Clade: Angiosperms
- Clade: Monocots
- Order: Asparagales
- Family: Orchidaceae
- Subfamily: Epidendroideae
- Genus: Stanhopea
- Species: S. graveolens

Binomial name
- Stanhopea graveolens Lindl.

= Stanhopea graveolens =

Species of orchid

Stanhopea graveolens is a species of orchid occurring from south Mexico to Honduras. It has been incorrectly recorded in Brazil.
