= Taganga =

Fishing village and corregimiento in Magdalena, Colombia

- Corregimiento
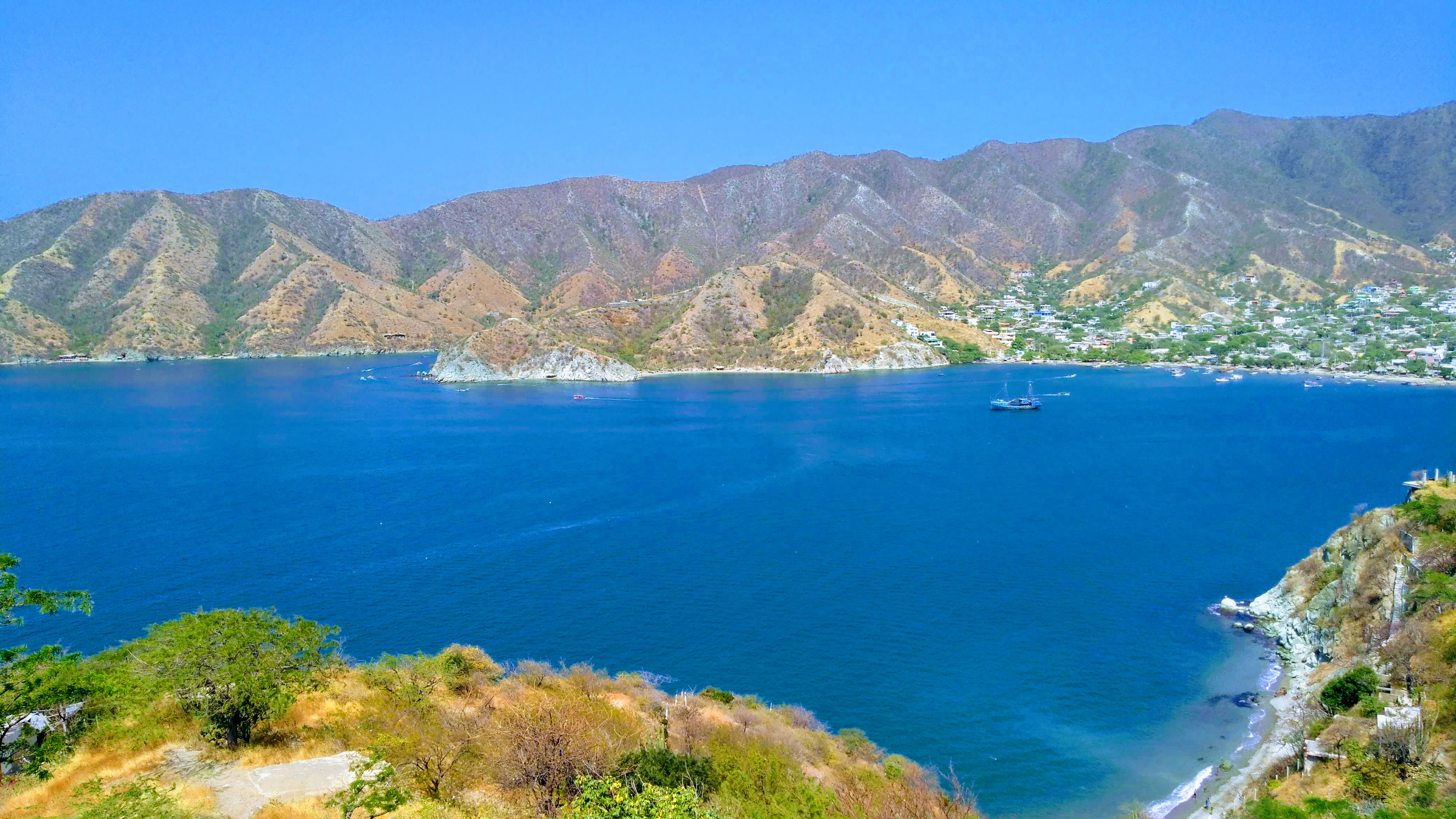
- View of Taganga
- Etymology: see text
- Position of Taganga with respect to Santa Marta
- Coordinates: 11°16′2.92″N 74°11′26.98″W
- Country: Colombia
- Department: Magdalena
- Municipality: Santa Marta
- Corregimiento: Taganga
- Founded: 29 July 1525
- Founder: Rodrigo de Bastidas

Government
  - Mayor (Santa Marta): Rafael Martínez (2016-2019)

Area
  - Water: 0 km^{2} (0 sq mi) 0%
  - Urban: 1 km^{2} (0.39 sq mi)
- Elevation (Church): 11 m (36 ft)
- Highest elevation: 100 m (330 ft)
- Lowest elevation (Caribbean Sea): 0 m (0 ft)

Population (2005)
  - Corregimiento: 5,021
  - Urban: 5,021
  - Urban density: 5,000/km^{2} (13,000/sq mi)
- Demonym: Taganguero/a
- Time zone: UTC-5 (Colombian Time)
- Postal code: 470001

Taganga is a traditional fishing village and corregimiento of Santa Marta, located on the Caribbean coast of Colombia at about 10 minutes or 3 kilometres (1.9 mi) north of Santa Marta. Both Santa Marta and Taganga were founded by Rodrigo de Bastidas on July 29, 1525, making them two of the oldest remaining colonial settlements in present-day Colombia.

The touristic town and backpacker hub is famous for its sunsets, diving and access to the Tayrona National Natural Park. Bohemian and richly decorated Taganga is full of hostels and forms part of the South American Gringo Trail.

== Etymology ==
The source of the name Taganga is uncertain; it is either derived from the Taganga people inhabiting the area before the Spanish conquest, from the words ta and gunmy; "Snake mountain range" or from the Tairona words ta and ganga; "Entrance of the sea".

== Geography and geology ==
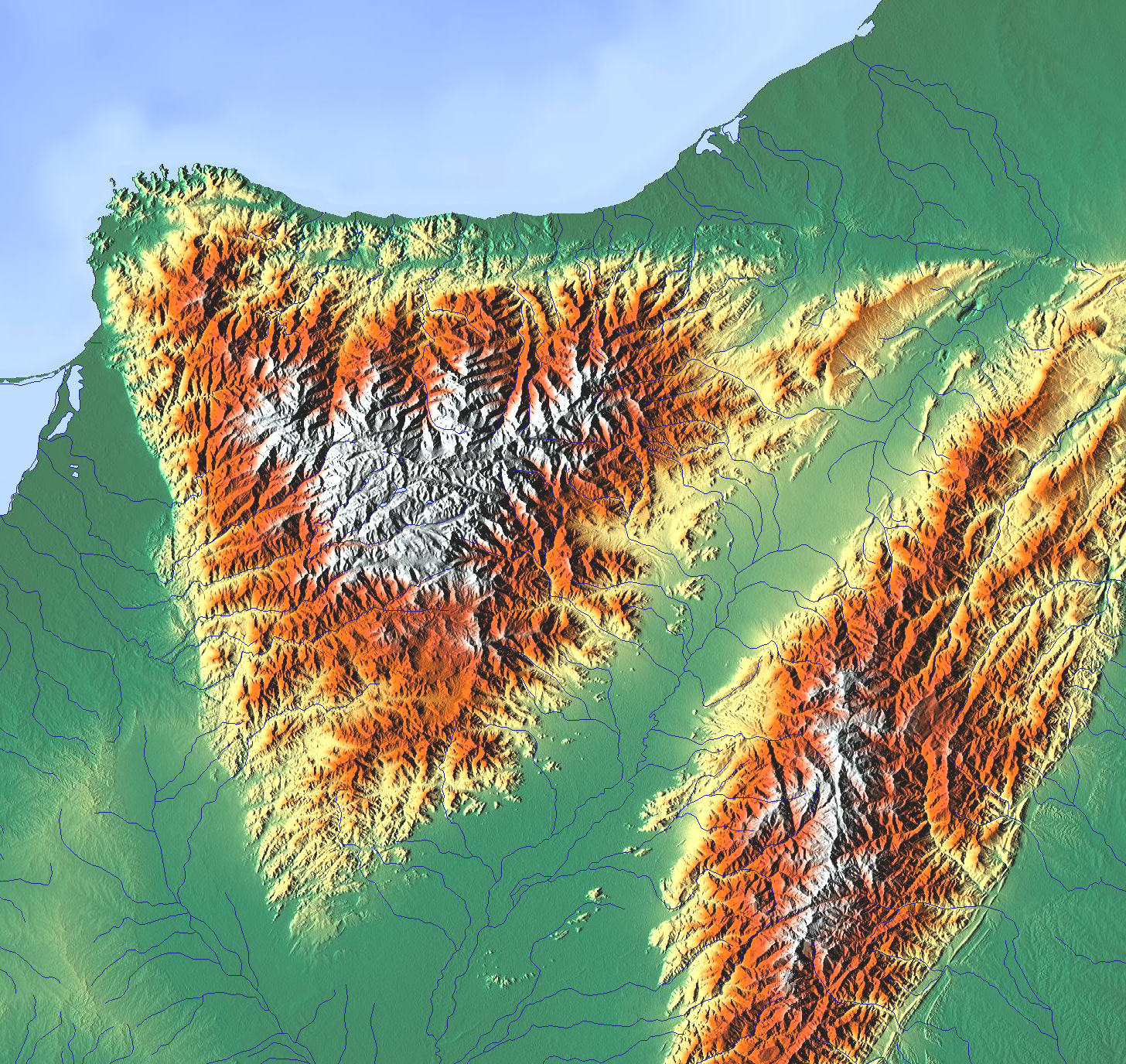
Position of Taganga with respect to the Sierra Nevada de Santa Marta

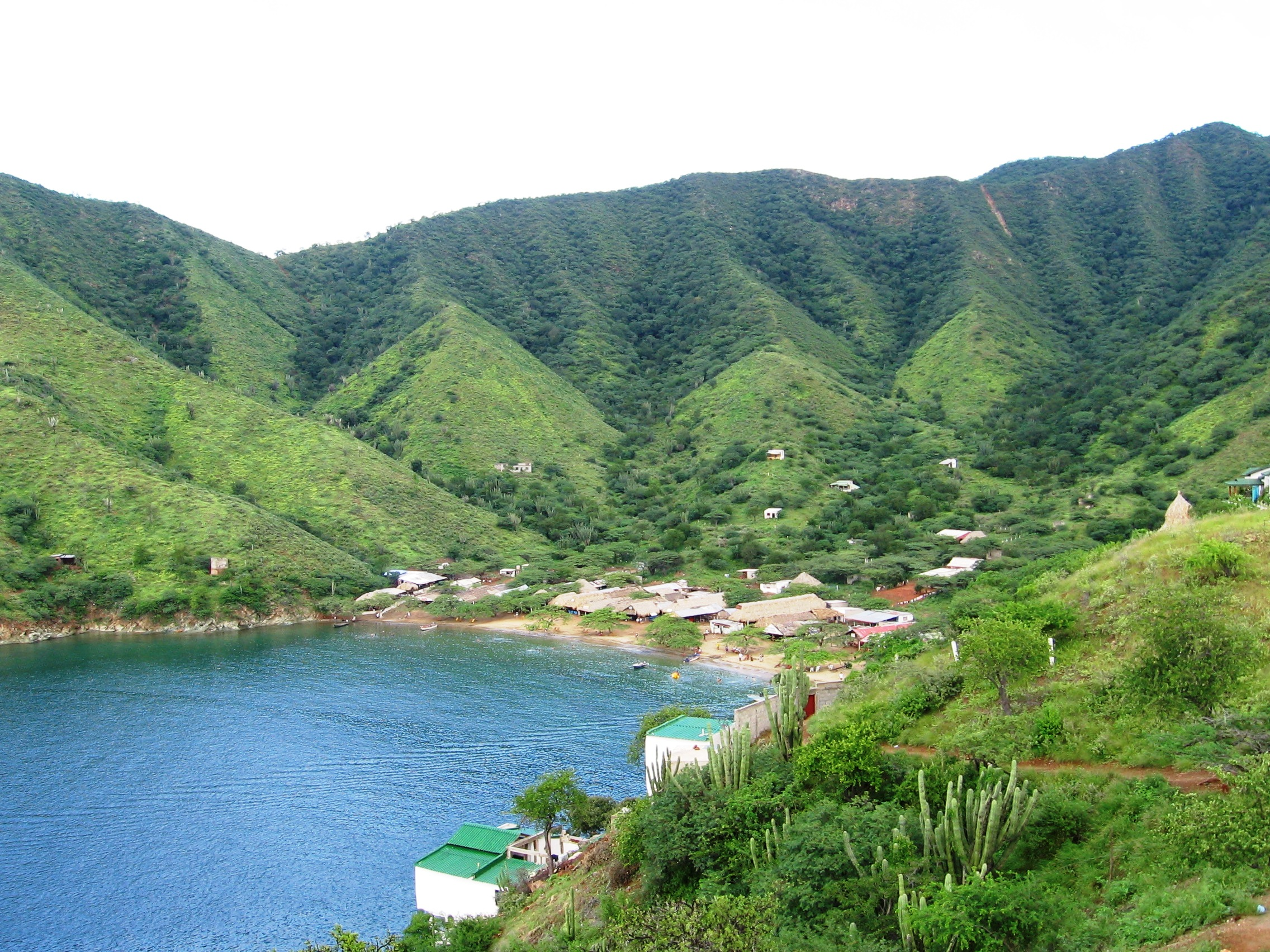
The Taganga Fault forms the northern boundary of the village bordering the triangular shaped alluvial fans coming off the mountains in the background of the village

Taganga is located on the northern coast of Colombia, at the northwestern flank of the Sierra Nevada de Santa Marta, the triangular mountain range in northern Colombia hosting the double peak Pico Cristóbal Colón and Pico Simón Bolívar, the highest mountain(s) (5,700 metres (18,700 ft)) closest to the sea (42 kilometres (26 mi)) in the world.

The village of approximately 1 square kilometre (0.39 sq mi) is situated south of the Tayrona National Park. It is home to the Tairona people and to a rich biodiversity. The mountain range is thought to have formed from to the easternward movement of the Caribbean Plate, along the Oca Fault, which forms the boundary with the South American Plate.

The area around Tanganga geologically forms part of the Santa Marta Supergroup with main rock types metamorphic rocks as phyllites and amphibolites. The phyllites are overlain by the Ciénaga Marble. The greenish phyllites are rich in phyllosilicates, amphiboles and large crystals of pyrite, while the amphibolites contain quartzite veins showing stockwork patterns surrounded by muscovite. The contact of the two metamorphic facies is located within Taganga.

The urban center of Taganga is situated on alluvial fan deposits fed by the hinterland of the foothills of the Sierra Nevada de Santa Marta.

Analysis of actinolite minerals in the phyllites of Taganga produced Lower and Mid-Cretaceous ages, which is much older than the Rodadero Formation outcropping south of Santa Marta. The metamorphic rocks were formed under pressures of 3–9.5 kbar and temperatures between 300 °C (572 °F) and 650 °C (1,202 °F).

=== Taganga Fault ===
The Taganga Fault is the tectonic lineament separating the village of Taganga from the Tayrona Park in the north. The activity of the NE-trending fault has produced carbonitization of the phyllites. The fault is a reverse fault that is characterized by serpentinites, the presence of epidote and the formation of talc minerals.

== Climate ==
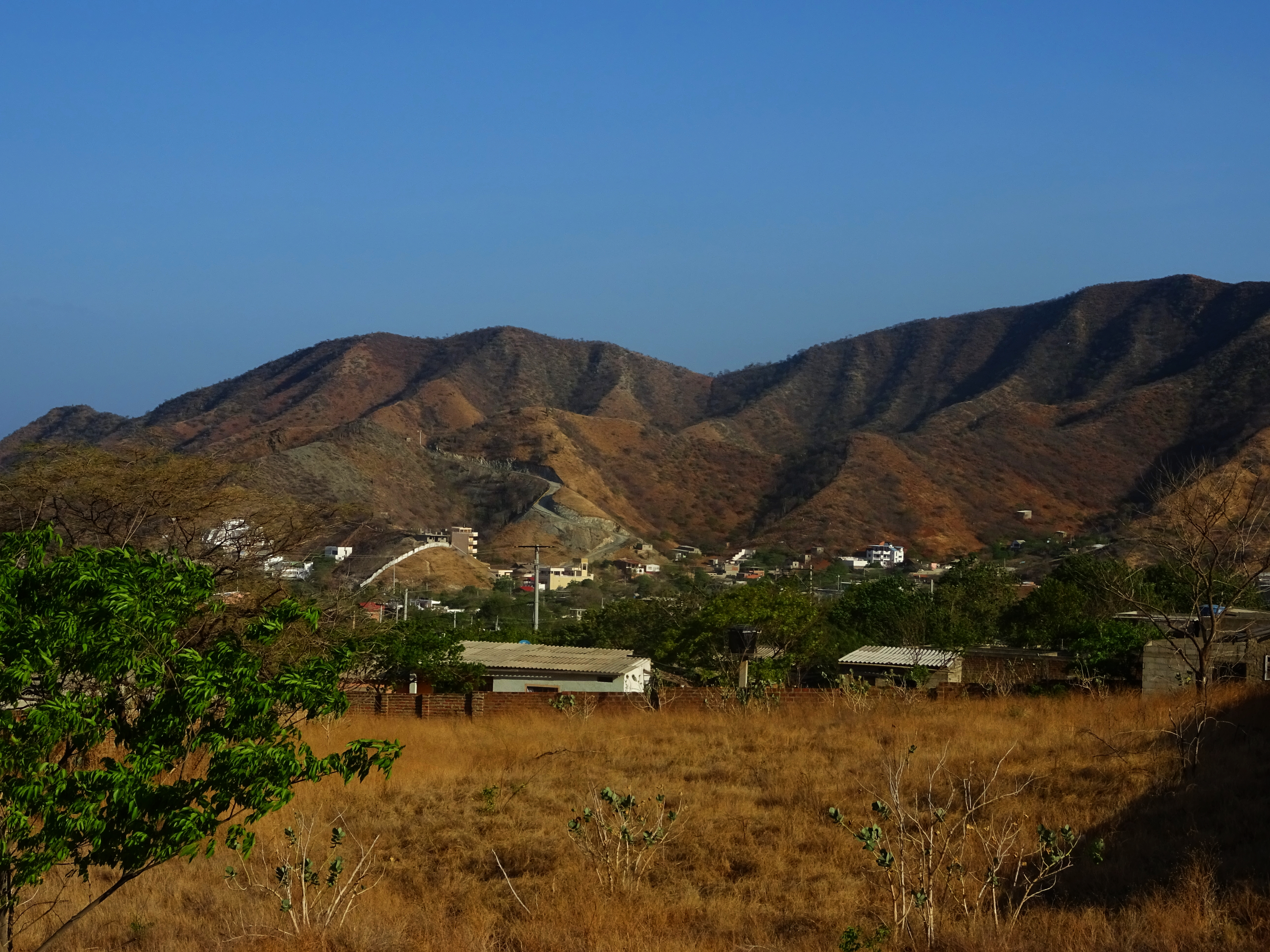
Drought in Taganga in May 2016; 1 day of rain since November 2015

The climate of Taganga is BSh (Köppen classification), with hot days and warm nights with average daily temperatures of 30 °C (86 °F) to 32 °C (90 °F) and night average of 24 °C (75 °F). Rainfall is scattered throughout the year with a total of 661 millimetres (26.0 in), but many dry periods cause water shortages in the village. From November 2015 to May 2016 a strong drought was present in Taganga; it only rained for one day in this period (299 millimetres (11.8 in)).

Taganga - 11 m

Climate chart (precipitation, max. and min. temperature)
| J | F | M | A | M | J | J | A | S | O | N | D |
| 9 32 22 | 2 32 22 | 3 33 23 | 23 33 24 | 70 33 24 | 78 33 24 | 56 33 24 | 71 33 24 | 114 33 23 | 134 32 23 | 77 32 23 | 24 32 22 |
- █ Average max. and min. temperatures in °C
- █ Precipitation totals in mm
- Source: Climate-data.org - Taganga
Imperial conversion
| J | F | M | A | M | J | J | A | S | O | N | D |
| 0.4 90 71 | 0.1 90 72 | 0.1 91 73 | 0.9 91 74 | 2.8 91 75 | 3.1 91 75 | 2.2 92 75 | 2.8 91 75 | 4.5 91 74 | 5.3 90 74 | 3 89 73 | 0.9 90 72 |
- █ Average max. and min. temperatures in °F
- █ Precipitation totals in inches

== History ==
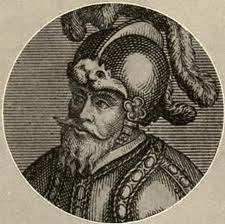
Rodrigo de Bastidas, founder of Santa Marta and Taganga

In the time before the arrival of the Spanish, Santa Marta was populated by the Gaira indigenous people. Taganga was inhabited by the Taganga, under the leadership of a cacique. In those ages the population of Taganga was substantial.

The first European sighting of the mainland of South America was by Christopher Columbus at his third voyage to the Americas in August 1498 when he sailed through the Gulf of Paria separating the island of Trinidad with mainland present-day Venezuela. Although Colombia is named after Columbus, he never saw the lands of current Colombia. The furtherst south Columbus went was in present-day Panama, that until 1903 was part of (Gran) Colombia. One of Columbus's competitors, Alonso de Ojeda, was the first conquistador who set foot on mainland Colombia in 1499. In 1502, the Colombian Caribbean coast stretching from the Needle Cape (Cabo de la Aguja) until the Gulf of Urabá, was explored for the first time. In 1514, the Sierra Nevada de Santa Marta was explored and on July 29, 1525, day of Santa Martha, her sister María and her brother Lázaro, the oldest colonial city of South America; Santa Marta, was founded by Rodrigo de Bastidas. Chronicler Juan de Castellanos visited Taganga in 1534.

In the 17th century, at the time of the encomiendas, the area from Santa Marta to Riohacha was ruled by governor Diego Fernández de Argote y Córdoba. The church of Taganga was built after the hermitage made of clay was destroyed in the earthquake of May 22, 1834. The earthquake was the result of tectonic movements of the Oca Fault.

=== Modern history ===
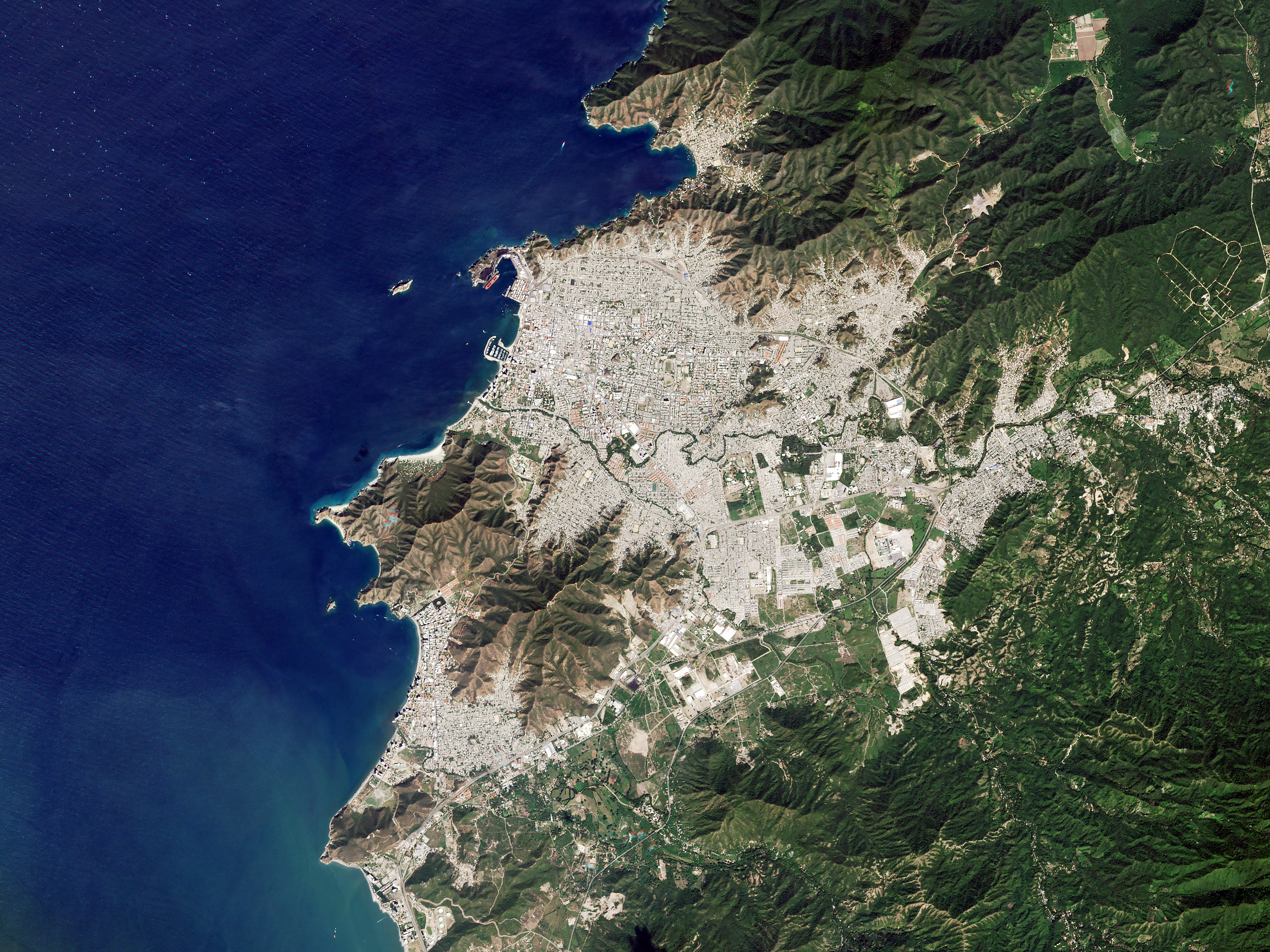
Taganga is north of Santa Marta and has grown in recent years

Until the 1950s, Taganga was an isolated fishing village due to the lack of road access from Santa Marta. In 1988 there was only one hotel in Taganga.

Since August 1998 Taganga is a separate corregimiento again and on December 12, 2014, Taganga was incorporated into a locality for improvement of the local conditions.

Pollution of the sea and projects for water treatment have gotten the attention of the authorities in the 21st century.

Taganga, located on the southern edge of the Tayrona National Park, suffers from illegal construction in the park area, designated protected land.

The village has a cultural center organizing festivities for the local residents. The center was established in 2004.

West of the football pitch of Taganga, since 2015 a park is under construction.

==== Sex and drug tourism ====
In 2015, an Israeli ex-soldier constructed a large hotel complex, including bars, swimming pool and tennis court, to accommodate Israeli travelers, notably ex-soldiers who ended their military service. In 2017, the hotel became increasingly known for providing drugs and prostitutes to its customers, as well as organizing orgy-like parties. Some of the prostitutes were minors.

At the end of 2017, the owner was summoned to a migration office in Santa Marta, arrested and deported after presenting a risk to "public safety and social tranquillity".

Following the arrest, locals found that the security has improved.

== Economy ==
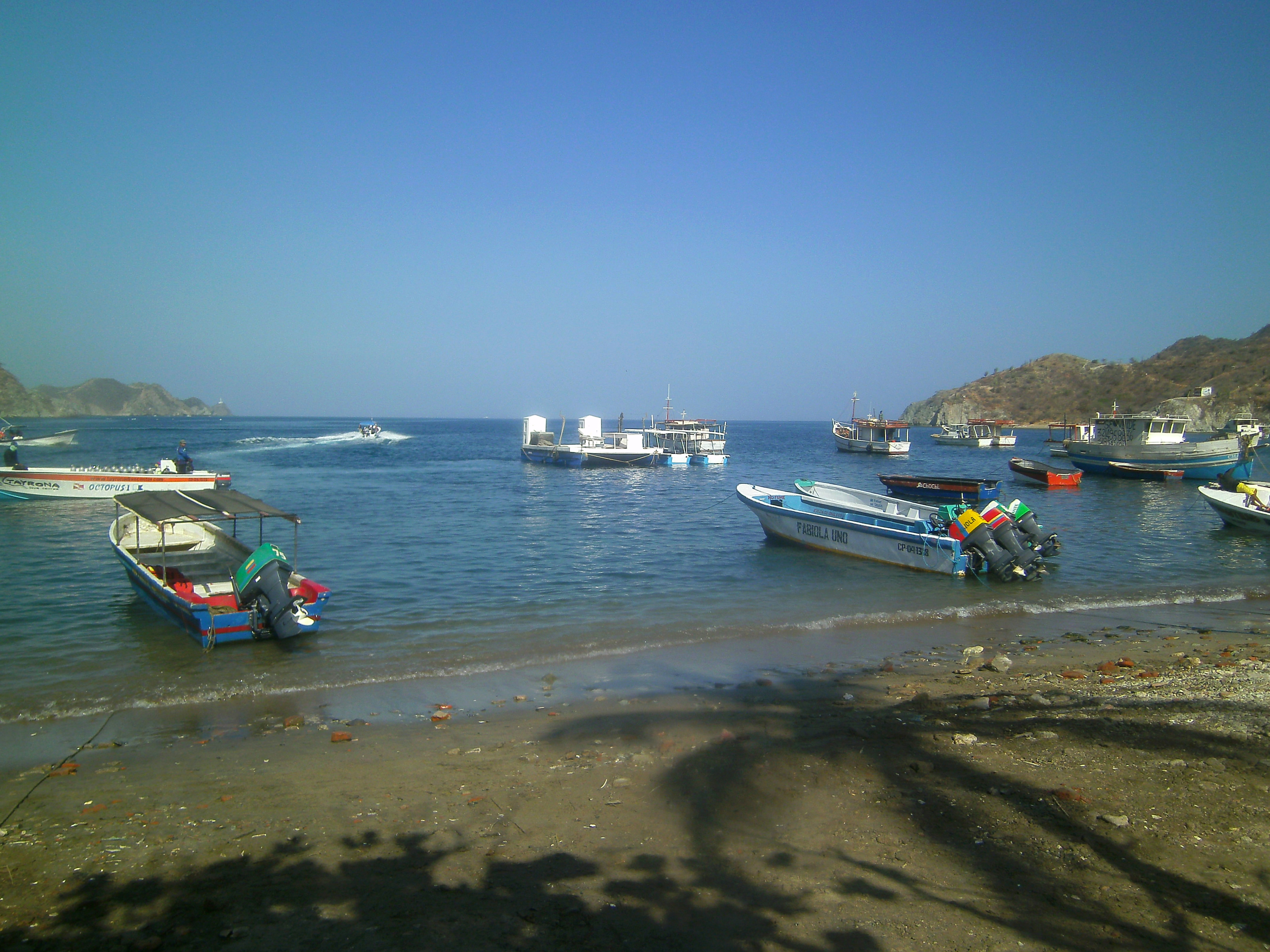
Boats in Taganga harbour in the morning

Main economical activity of the traditional village is fishing. The majority of the local population is active in the fishing industry with fishermen leaving the harbour early in the morning. The fishing boats are small wooden kayaks where three people row and one has a dragging net of 90 metres (300 ft) wide and 7 metres (23 ft) to 12 metres (39 ft) deep.

=== Commercial fishing ===
These and other fish species are caught around Taganga:

- Centropomus undecimalis, róbalo; common snook
- Eugerres plumieris, mojarra rayada; mojarra
- Mugil incilis, mojarra lisa; Parassi mullet
- Megalops atlanticus, sábalo; Atlantic tarpon

== Tourism ==
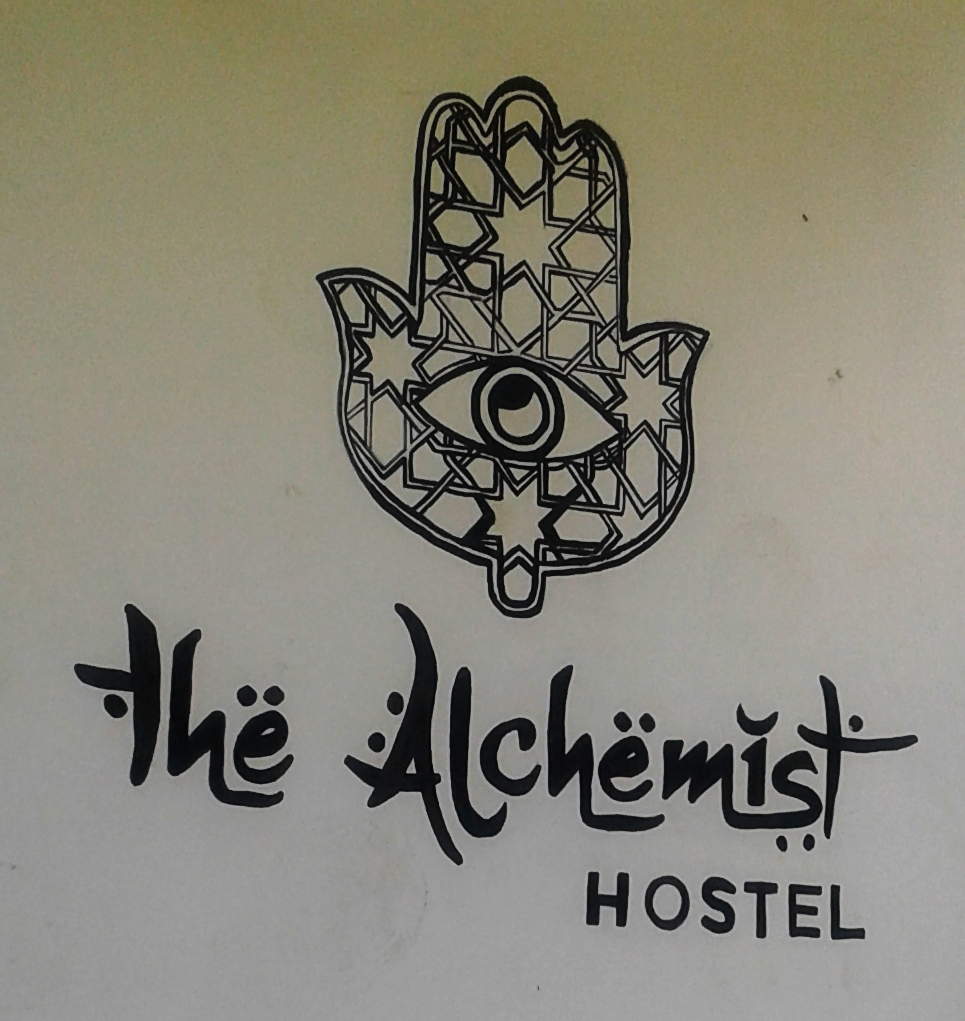
Mural of a hostel in Taganga

Since the construction of the road to Santa Marta in 1953, Taganga has been growing to become an important touristic village with numerous hotels, hostels and restaurant arising in the late 20th and early 21st century. The character of the backpacker hotspot is bohemian with various murals decorating the village. Most of the streets are unpaved.

Especially famous for Taganga are its sunsets; people come from Santa Marta to watch them on the beach. The colours can vary from orange to pink, depending on the atmospheric conditions.

Friction between the traditional local population of the village and the growing hostel industry mostly by foreign investments has been present in the 20th and 21st century.

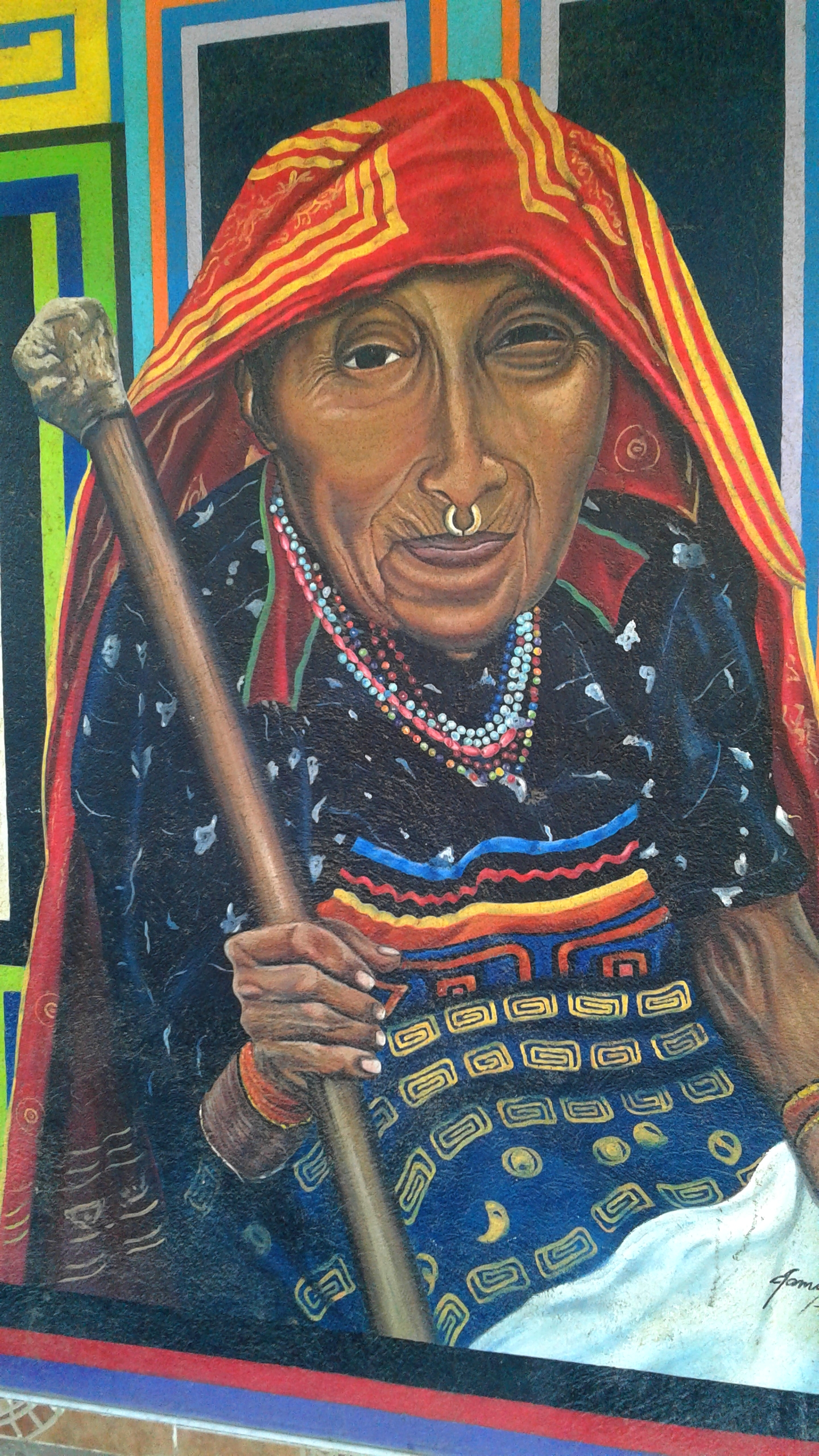
Mural of a Guna woman

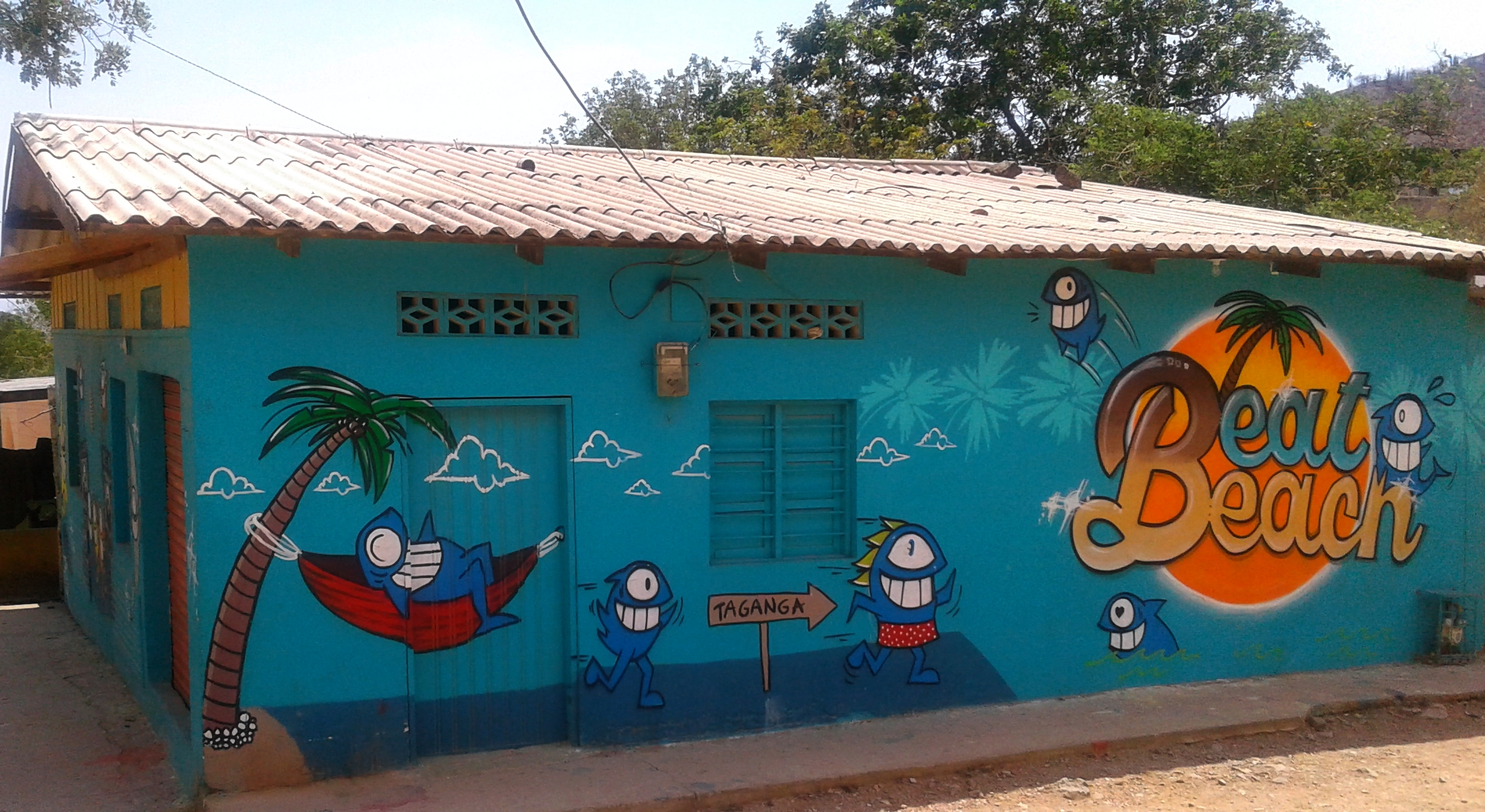
Mural in Taganga

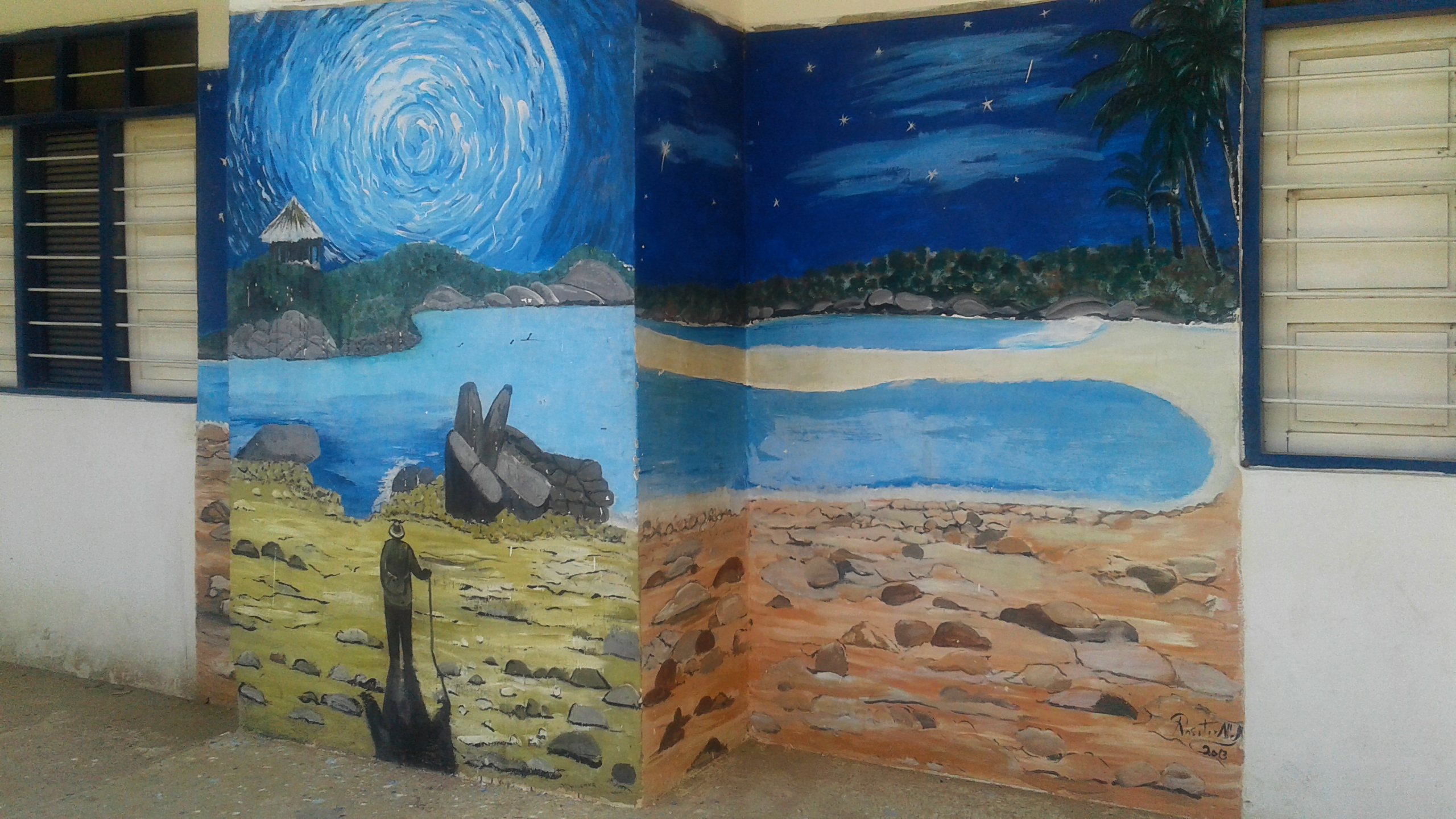
Another mural
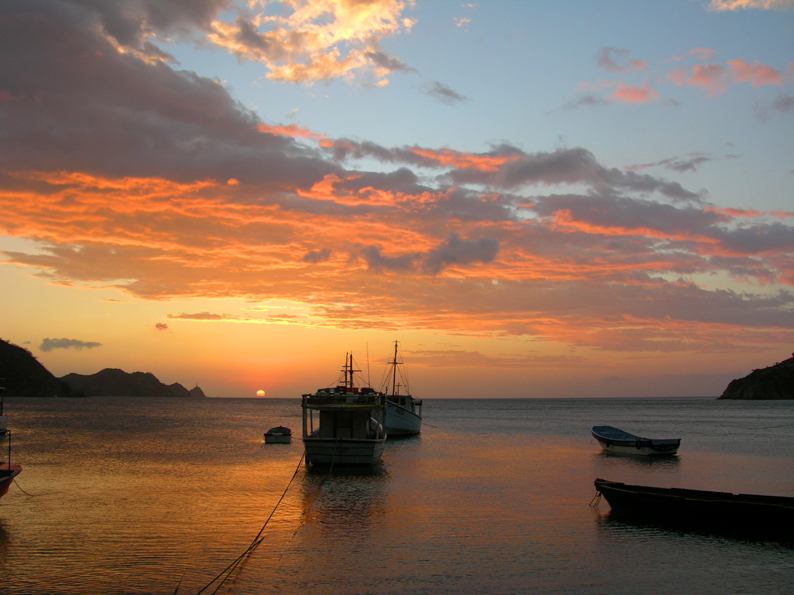
Sunset Taganga

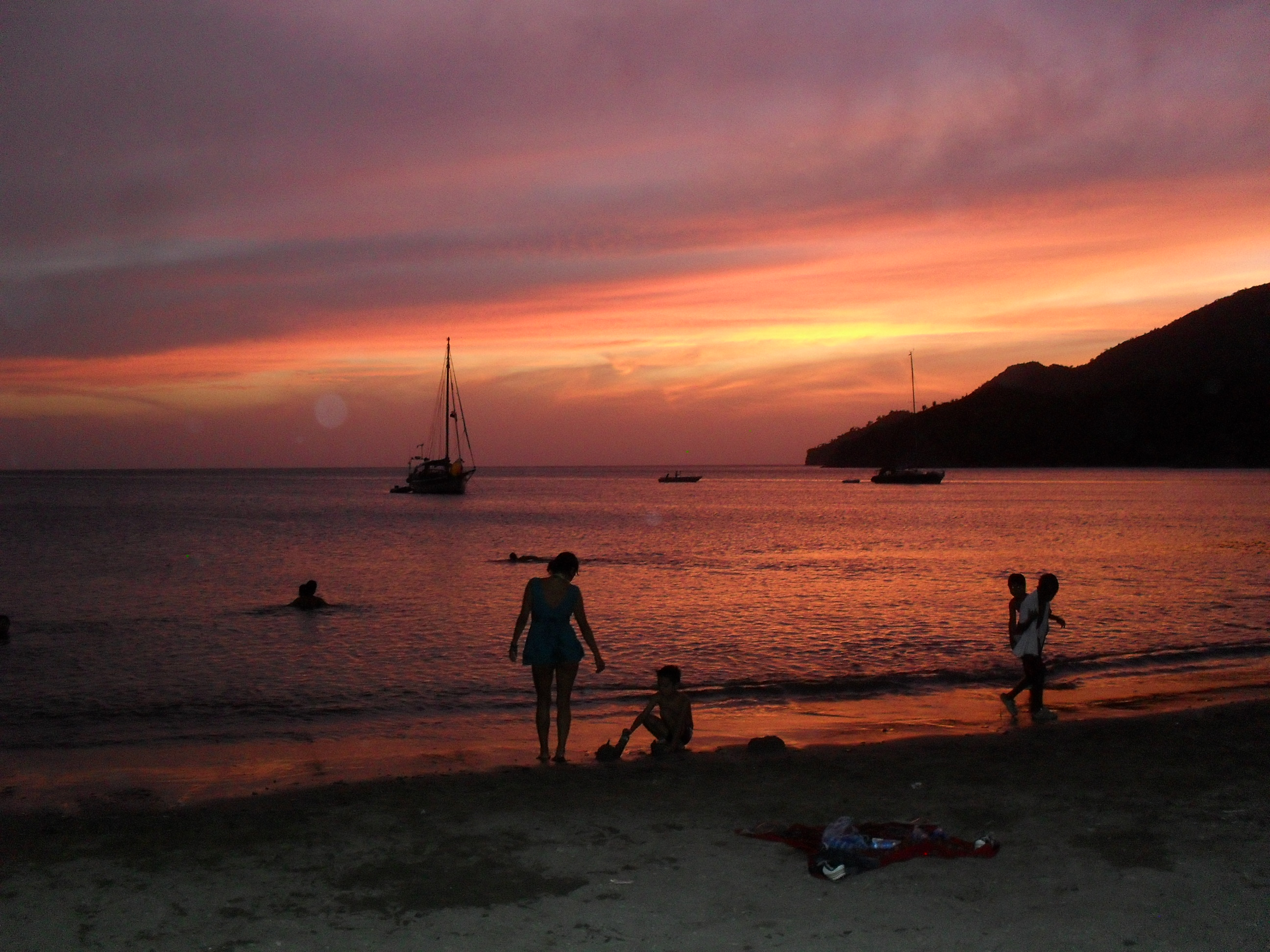
Sunset

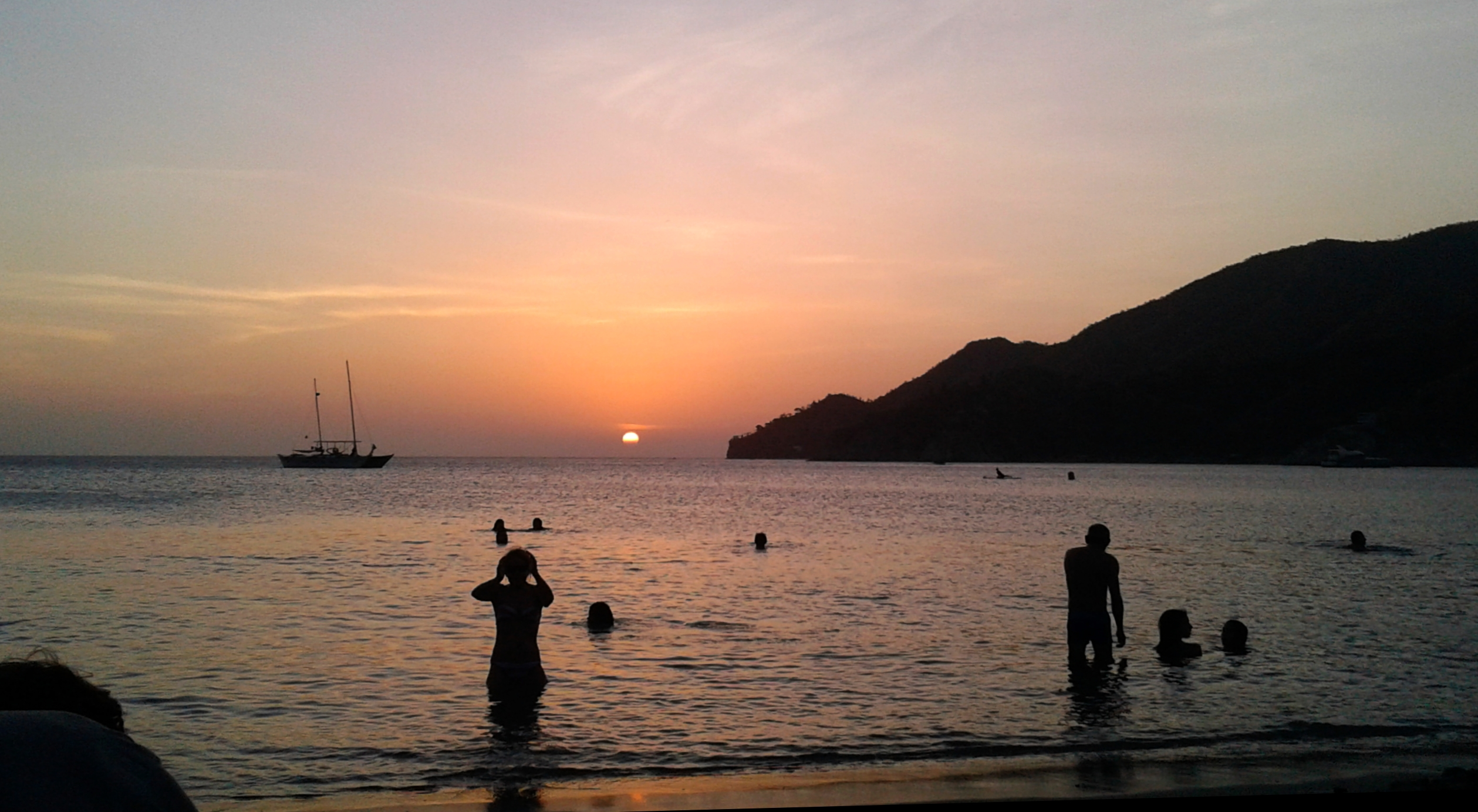
Sunset

=== Diving ===
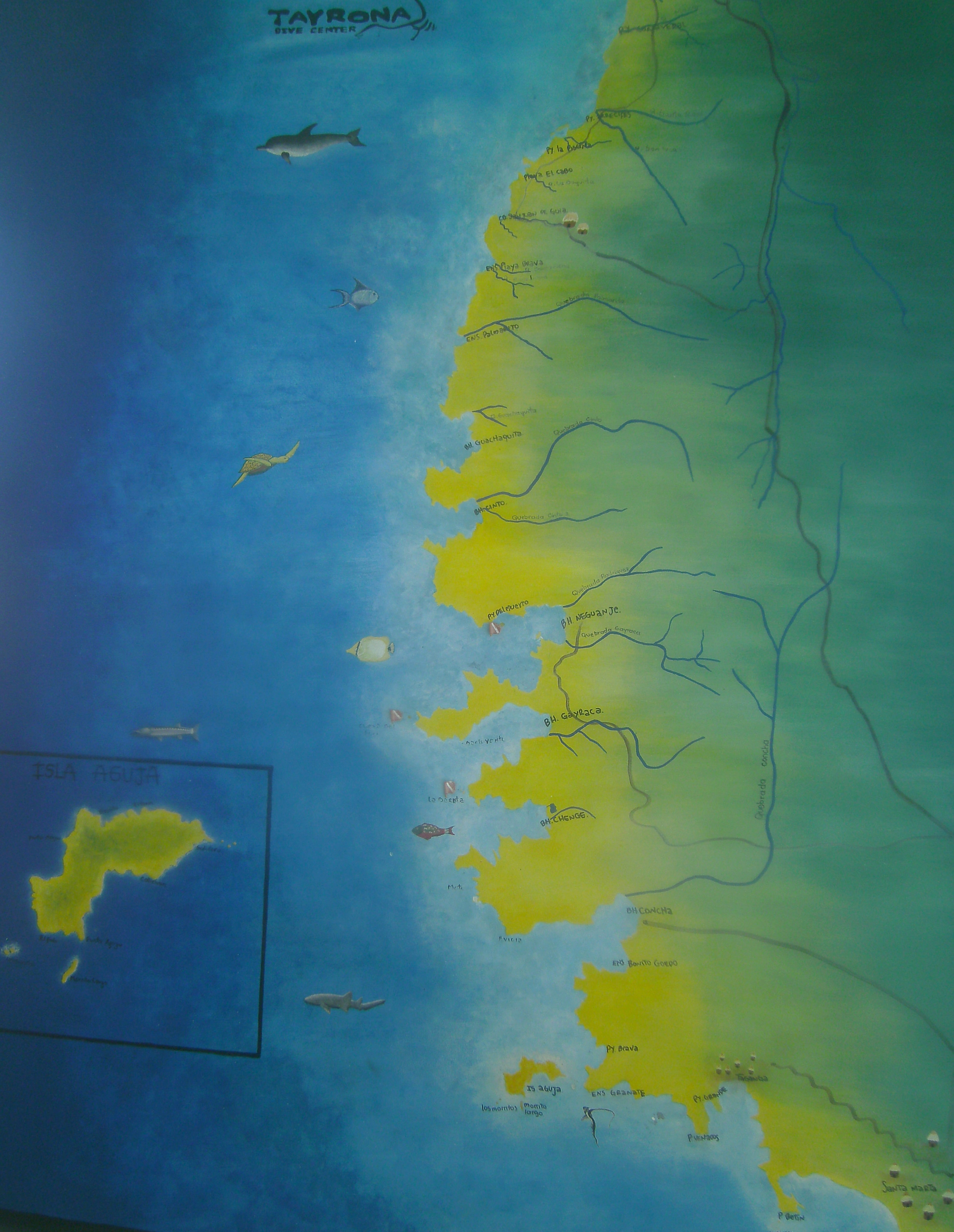
Dive sites in Tayrona National Park Isla Aguja is highlighted

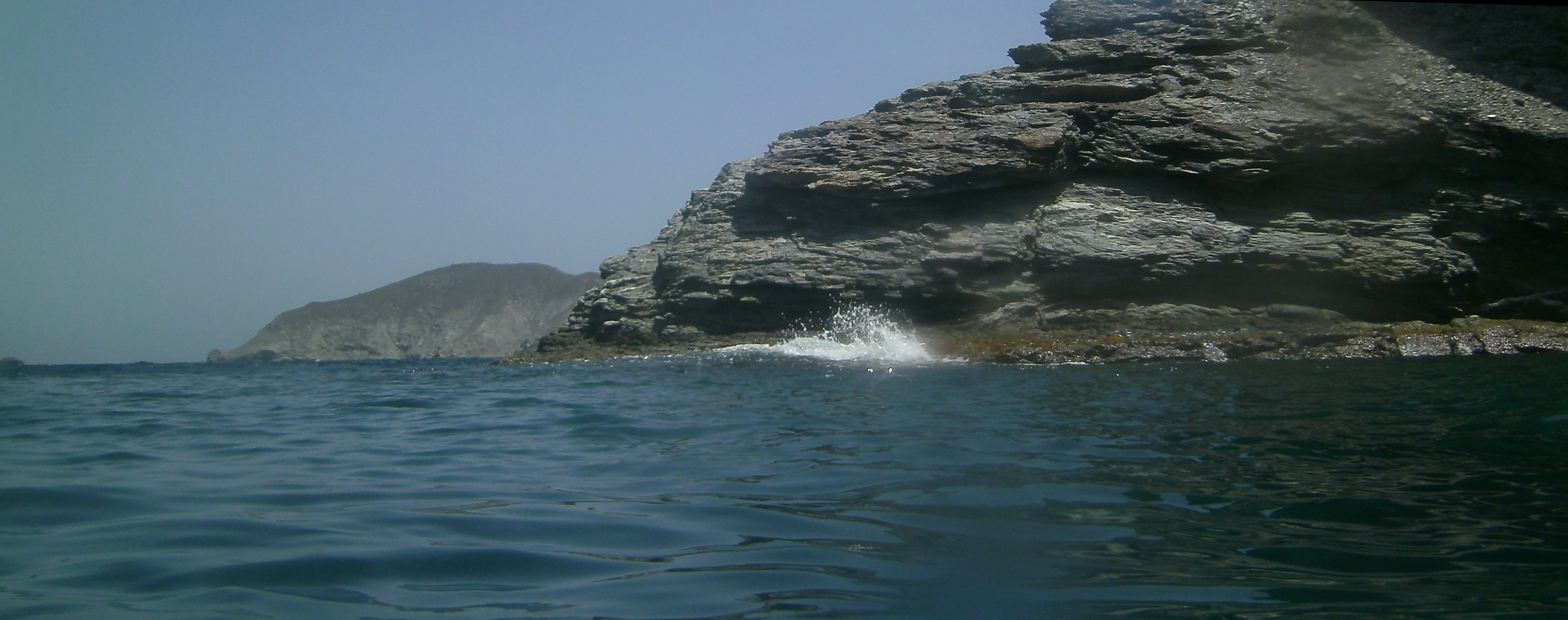
View of Isla Aguja

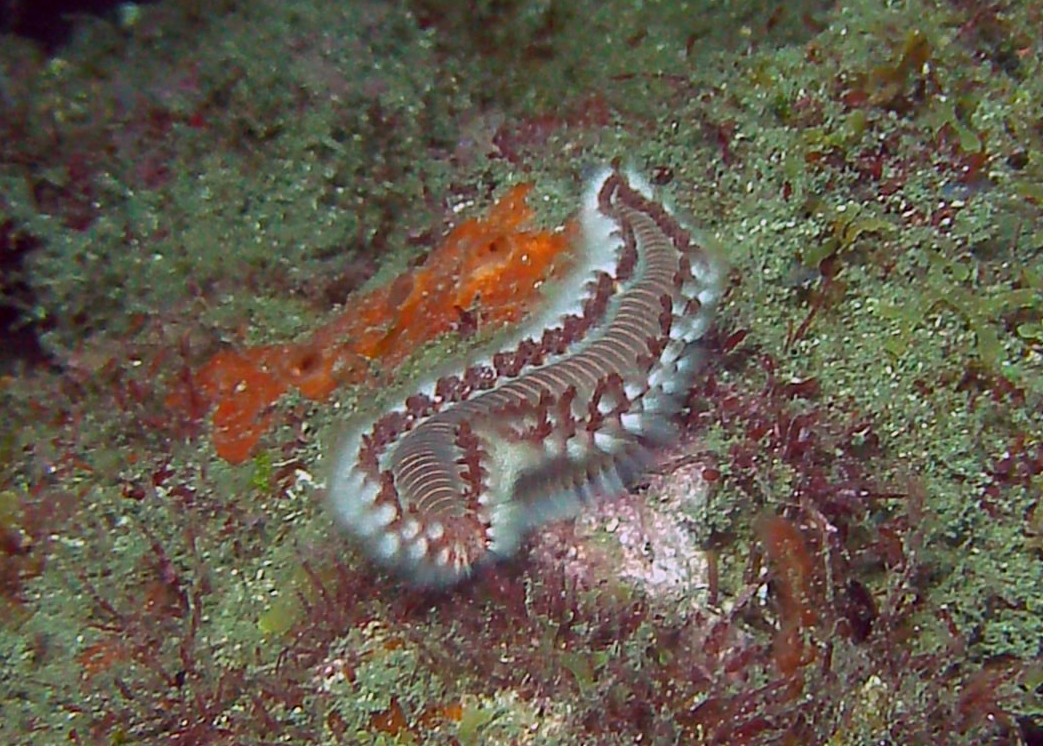
Sea slug around Isla Aguja

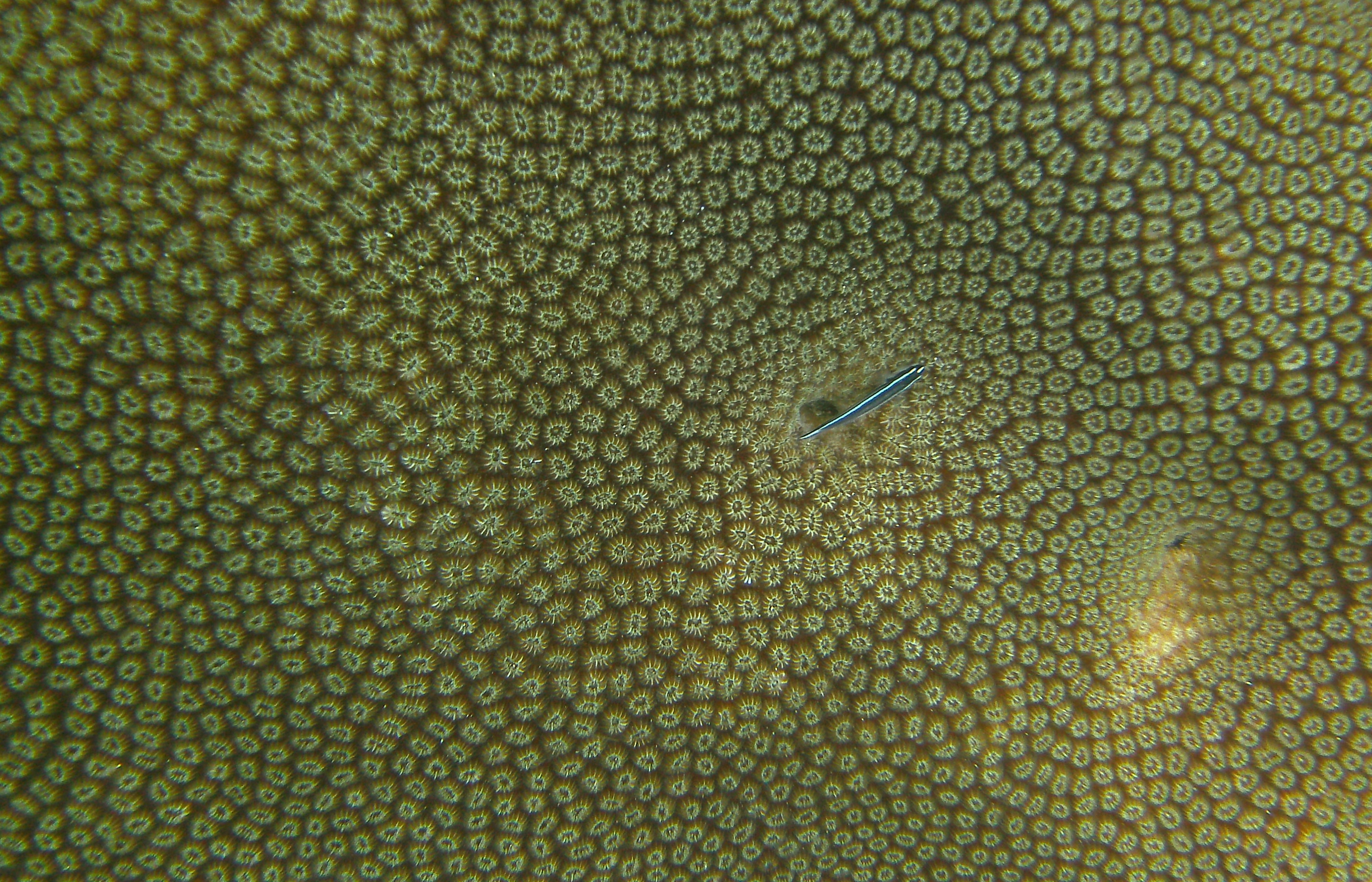
Coral and fish around Isla Aguja

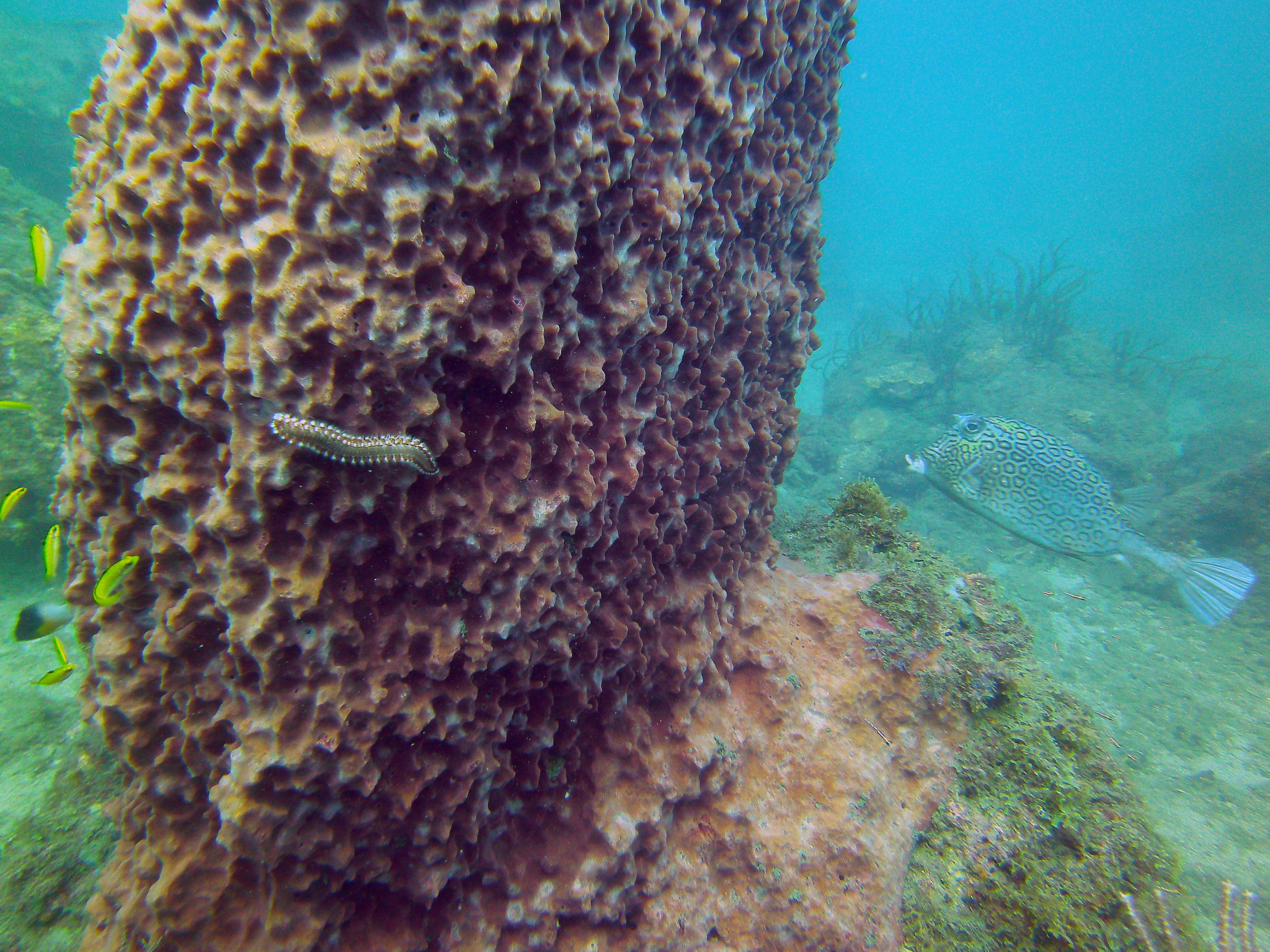
Honeycomb cowfish, sea slug and sponge around Isla Aguja

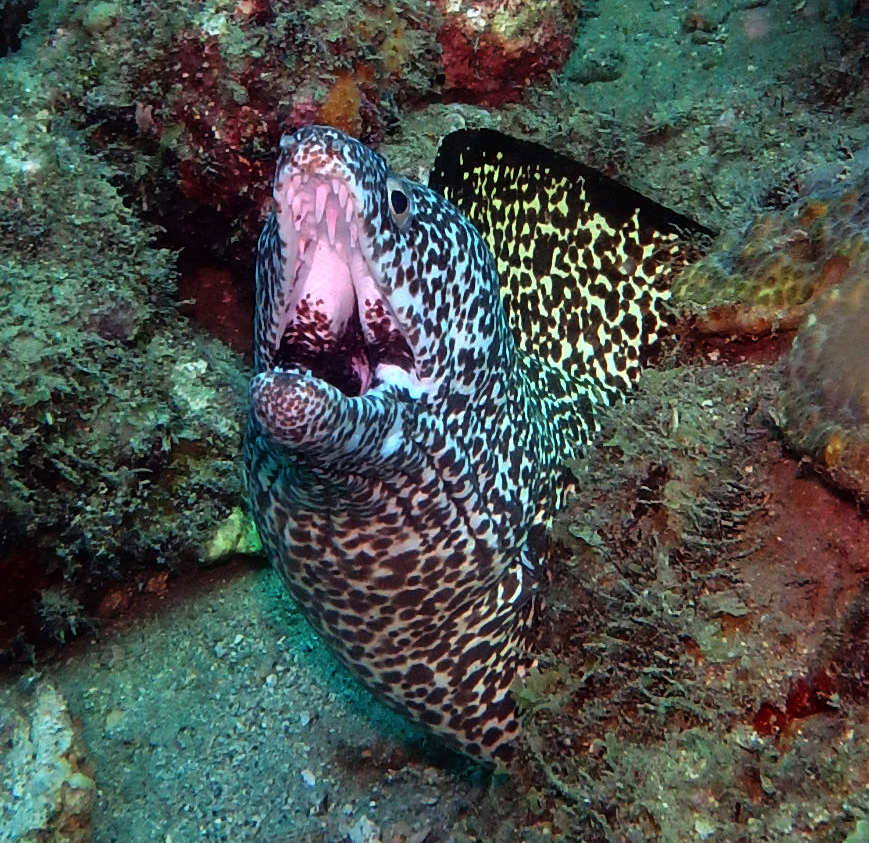
Spotted moray in the waters of Tayrona Park

Taganga is the starting point for one of the main dive locations of Colombia. The Malpelo and Gorgona Island reserves are the Pacific dive sites of the country, while diving around San Andrés y Providencia, the Rosario and San Bernardo Corals National Natural Park off the coast of Cartagena and in Tayrona Park is done in the Caribbean. More than ten dive centers offer courses of all levels at low cost in Taganga. The prices are among the lowest of the Caribbean, competing with Panama and Utila, Honduras.

Various types of corals, sponges, sea turtles, molluscs, crustaceans and over 129 species of fish have been identified in the waters around Taganga and Tayrona Park. Most of the diving is concentrated around Isla Aguja ("Needle Island").

Underwater fauna that can be encountered in the vicinity of Taganga are among others:

- Hippocampus reidi, cabillito de mar; slender seahorse
- Hippocampus erectus, lined seahorse
- Pterois volitans, pez león; red lionfish (invasive species, hunted)
- Sphyraena barracuda, gran barracuda; great barracuda
- Stegastes partitus; bicolor damselfish
- Acanthurus bahianus; ocean surgeon
- Chromis cyanea; blue chromis
- Sparisoma aurofrenatum; redband parrotfish
- Myripristis jacobus; blackbar soldierfish
- Halichoeres garnoti; yellowhead wrasse
- Haemulon flavolineatum; French grunt
- Chaetodon sedentarius; reef butterflyfish
- Abudefduf saxatilis; sergeant major
- Acanthurus coeruleus; blue tang
- Canthigaster rostrata; Caribbean sharp-nose puffer
- Haemulon chrysargyreum; yellowstripe grunt
- Mulloidichthys martinicus; yellow goatfish
- Bodianus rufus; Spanish hogfish
- Pseudupeneus maculatus; spotted goatfish
- Sparisoma viride; stoplight parrotfish
- Thalassoma bifasciatum; bluehead wrasse
- Synodus intermedius; sand diver
- Ocyurus chrysurus; yellowtail snapper
- Holocentrus adscensionis; squirrelfish
- Pomacanthus arcuatus; gray angelfish
- Clepticus parrae; Creole wrasse
- Diodon holocanthus; longspined porcupinefish
- Chaetodon ocellatus; spotfin butterflyfish
- Microspathodon chrysurus; jewel damselfish
- Serranus tabacarius; tobaccofish
- Amblycirrhitus pinos; redspotted hawkfish
- Prognathodes aculeatus; longsnout butterflyfish
- Holocanthus ciliaris; queen angelfish
- Scarus taeniopterus; princess parrotfish
- Chaetodon striatus; banded butterflyfish
- Scarus iseri; striped parrotfish
- Lactophrys triqueter; smooth trunkfish
- Cephalopholis cruentata; graysby
- Chaetodon capistratus; foureye butterflyfish
- Holacanthus tricolor; rock beauty
- Pomacanthus paru; French angelfish
- Haemulon plumierii; white grunt
- Acanthostracion polygonius; honeycomb cowfish
- Gymnothorax moringa; spotted moray
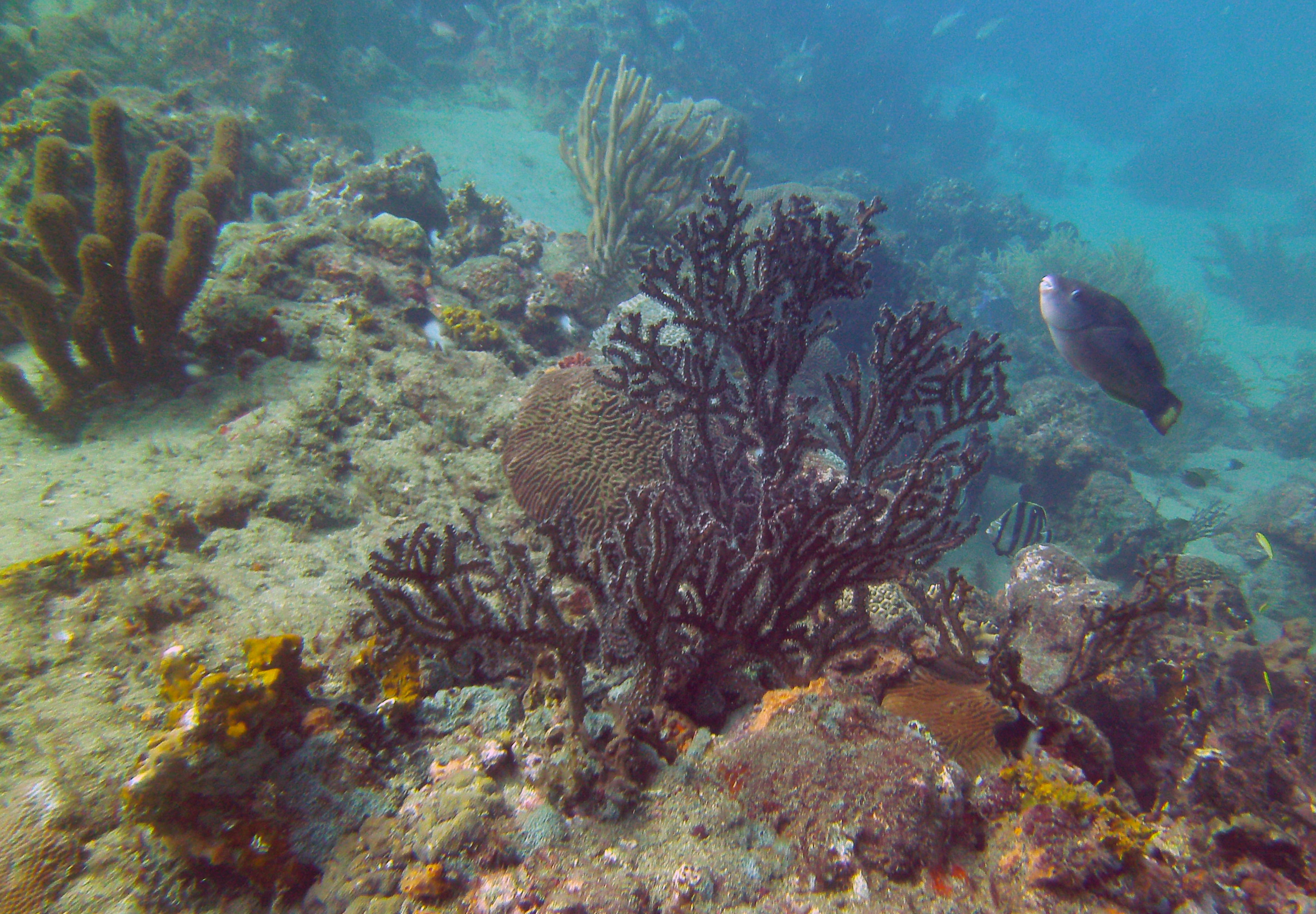
Diving around Isla Aguja

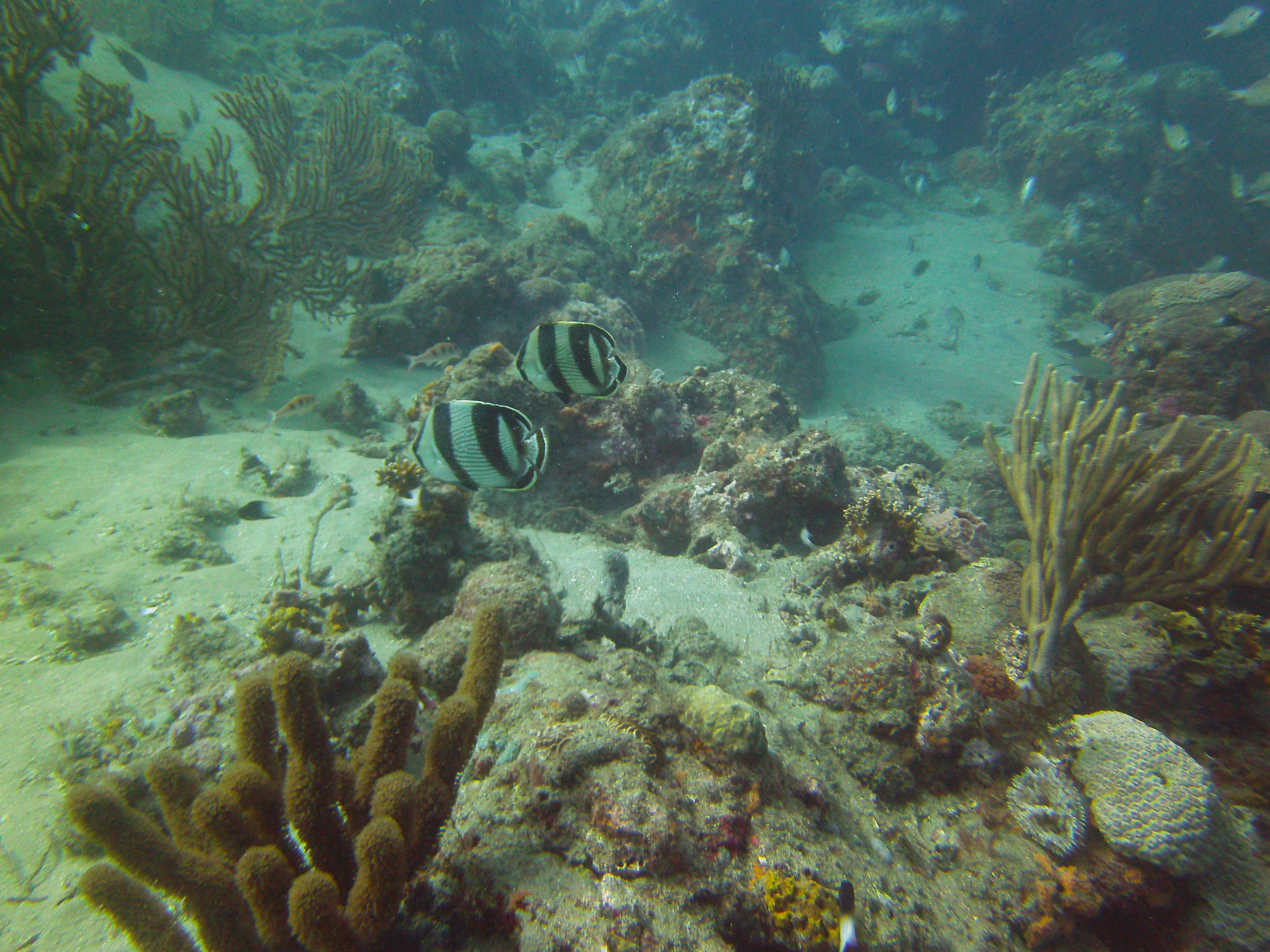
Diving around Isla Aguja

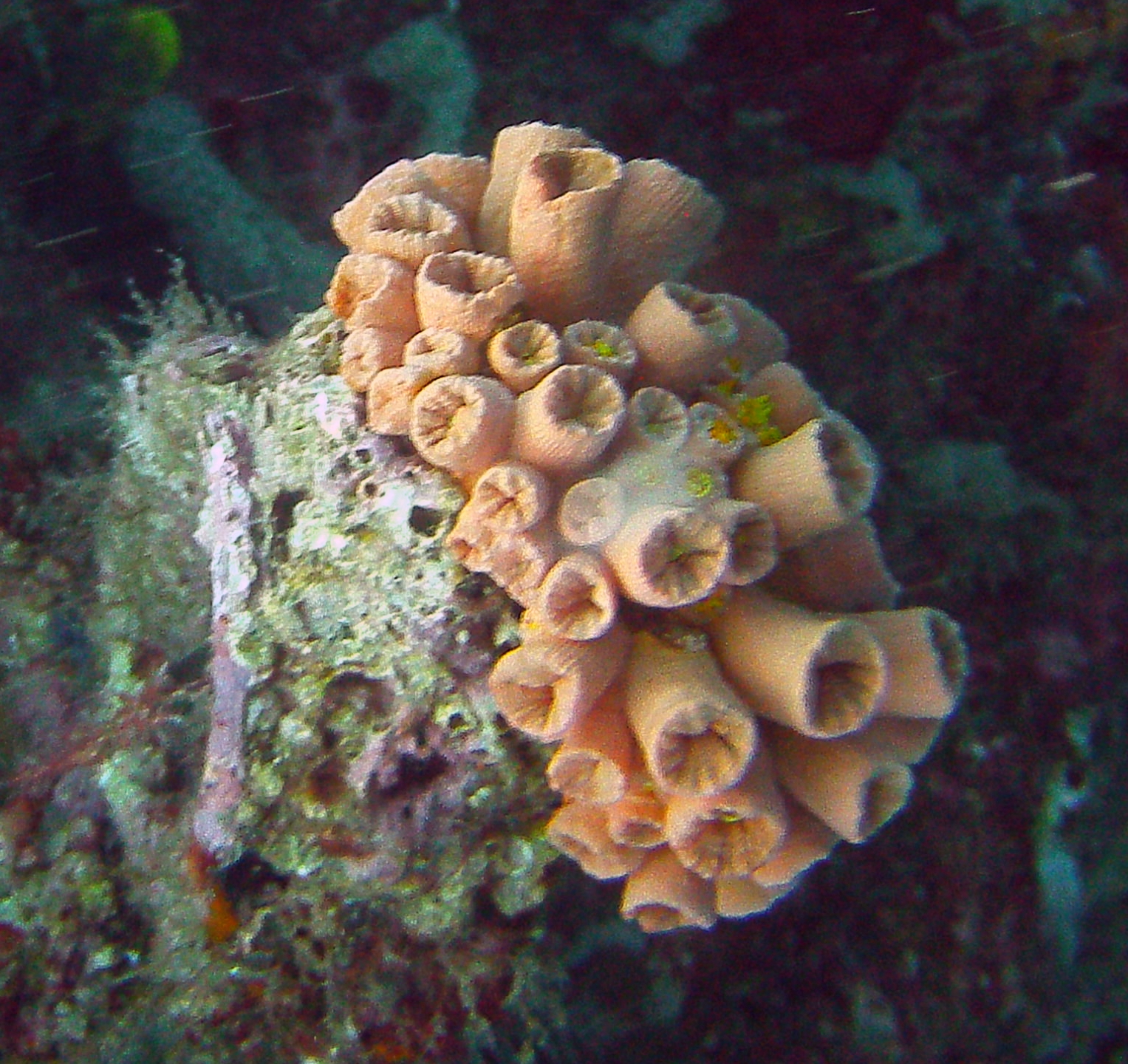
Coral around Isla Aguja

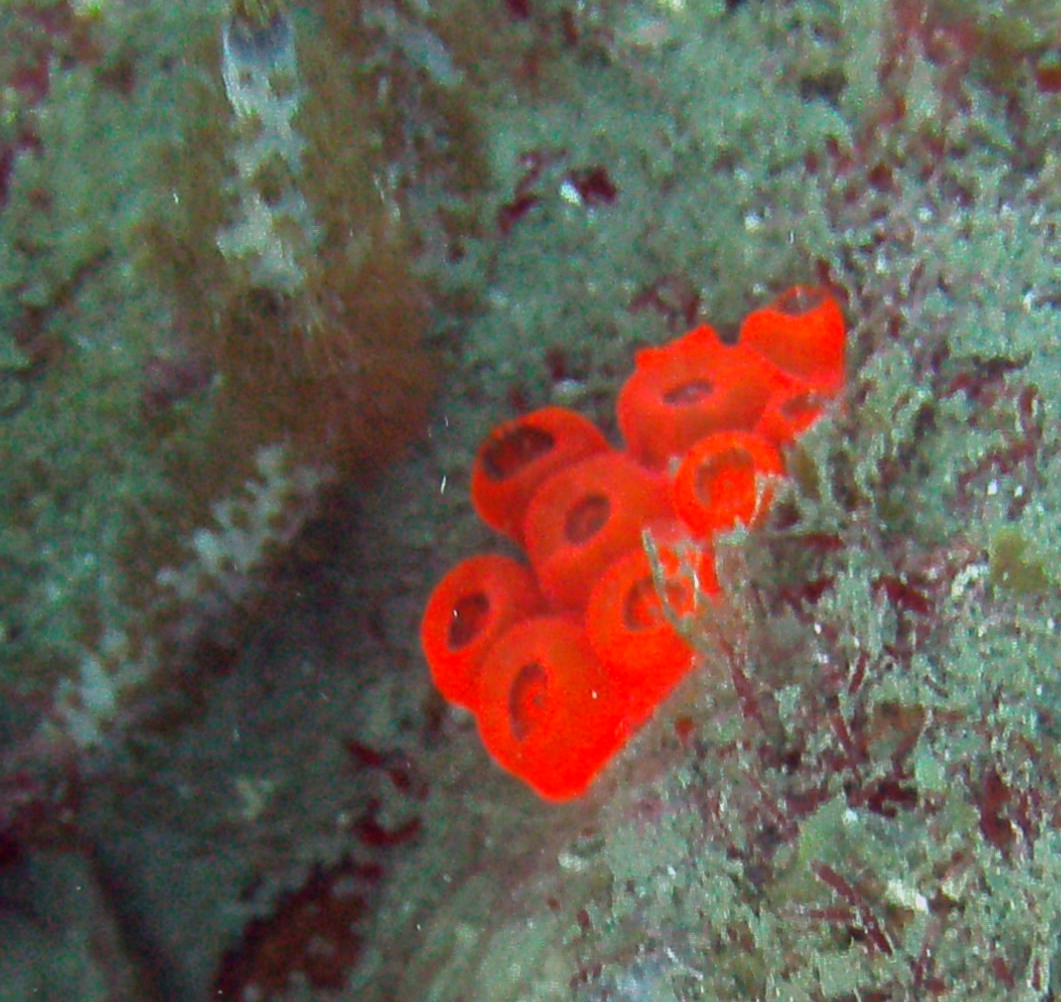
Coral around Isla Aguja

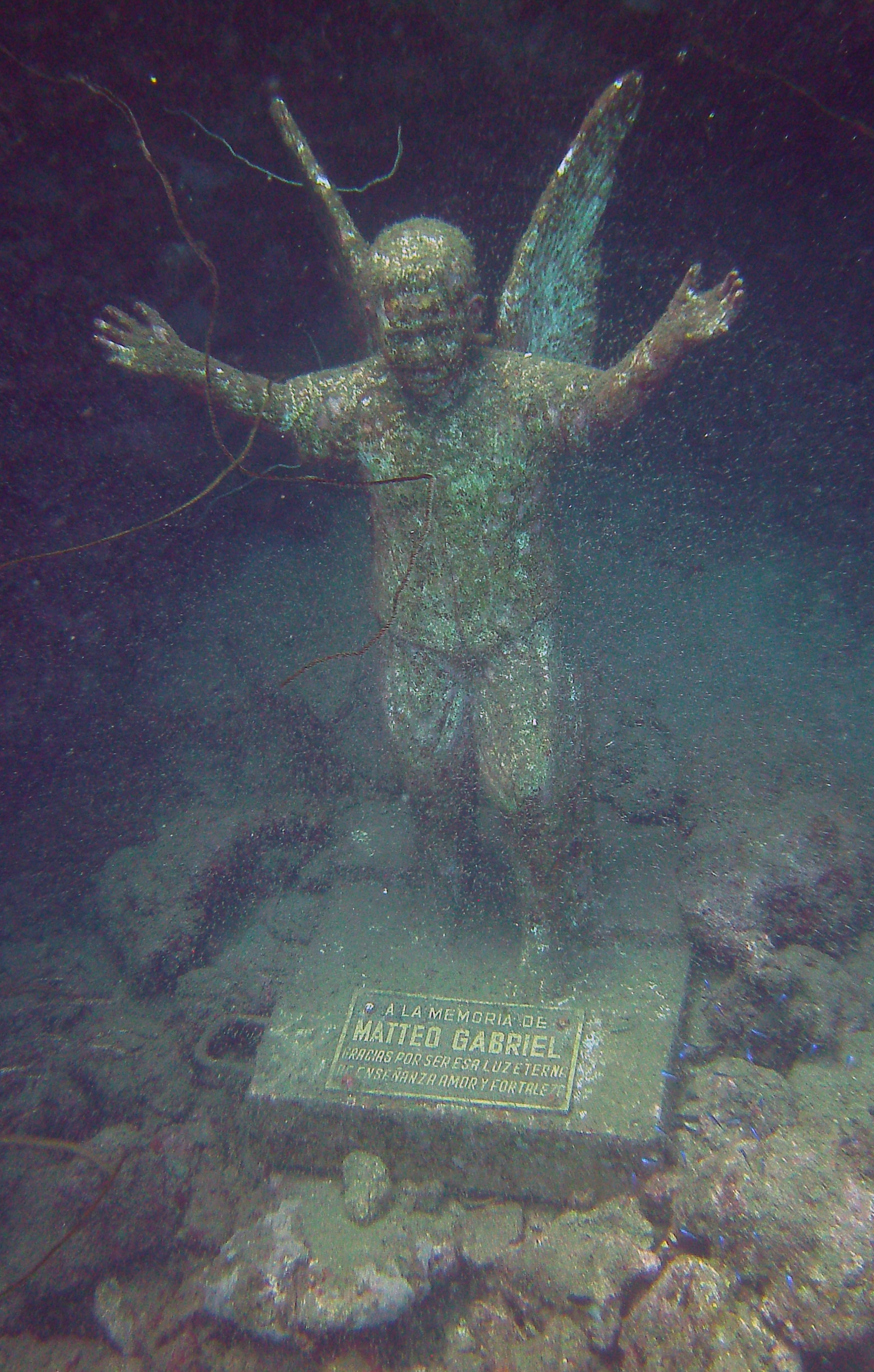
Lost diver statue

== Gallery ==
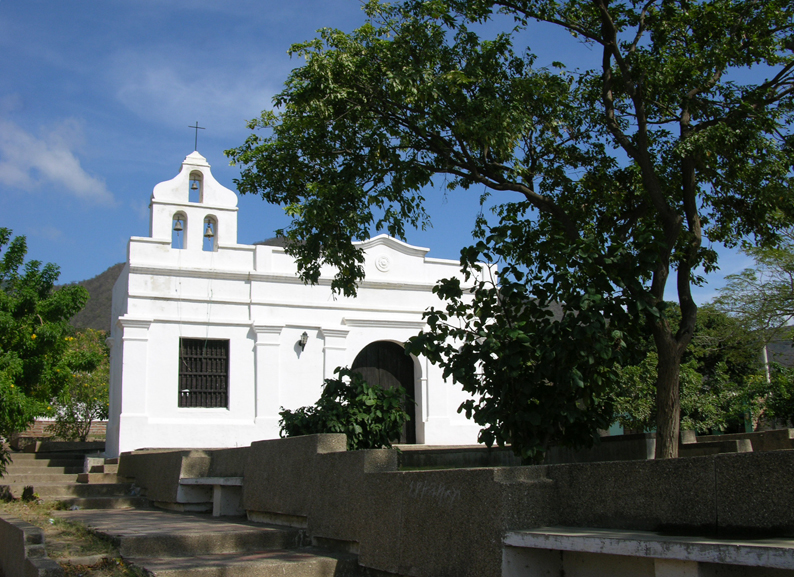
Church of Taganga

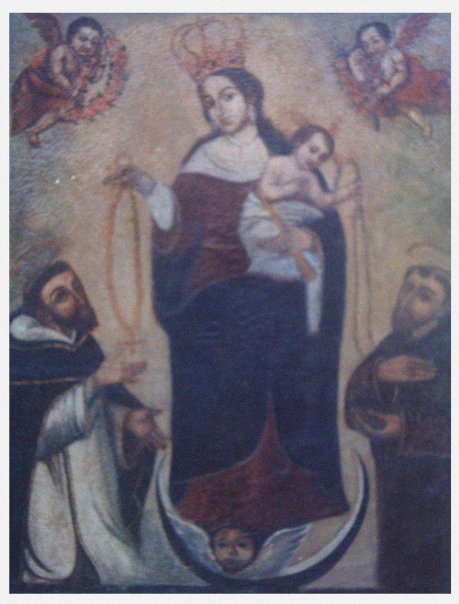
Church interior

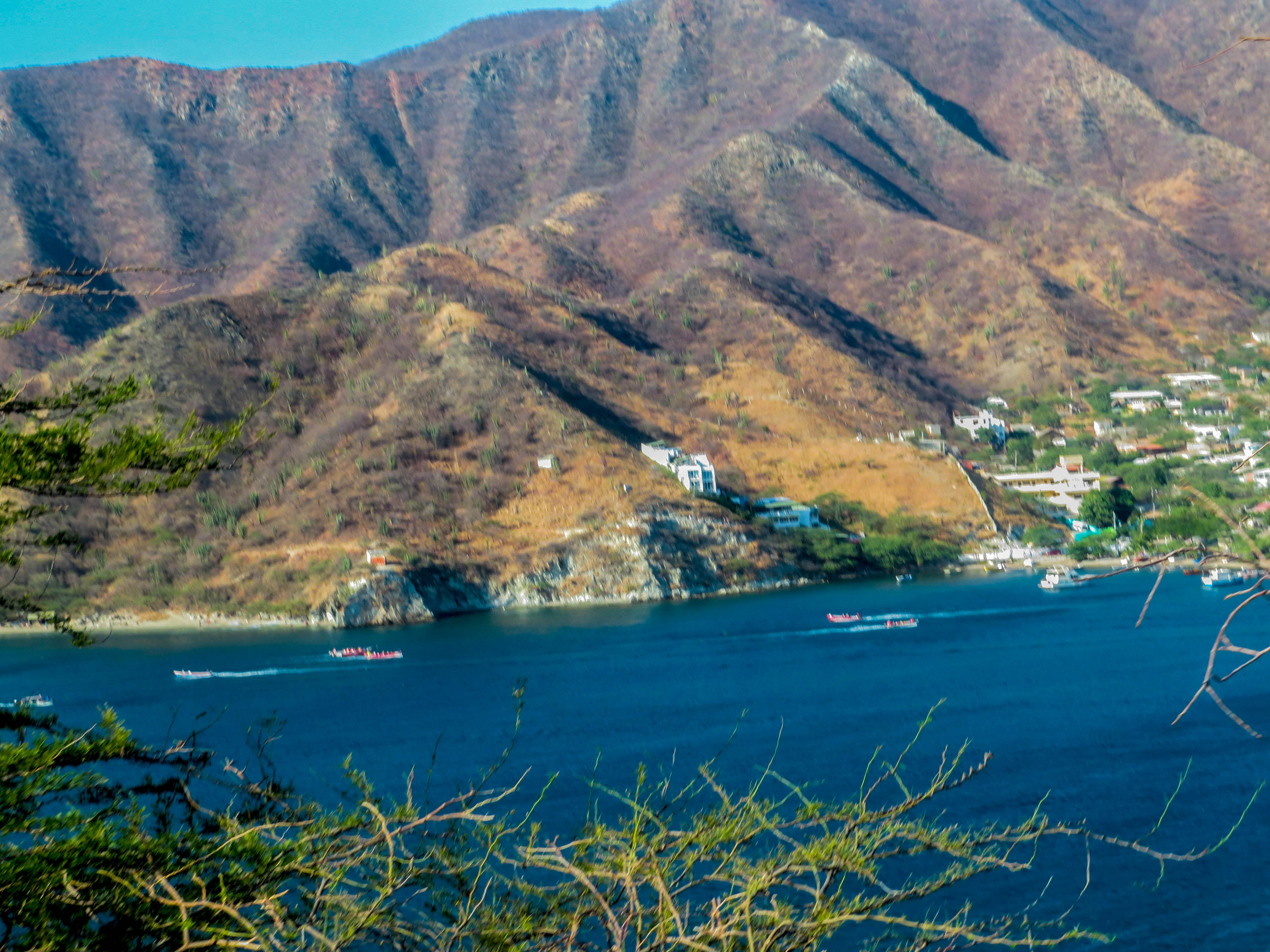
View of Taganga, 2014

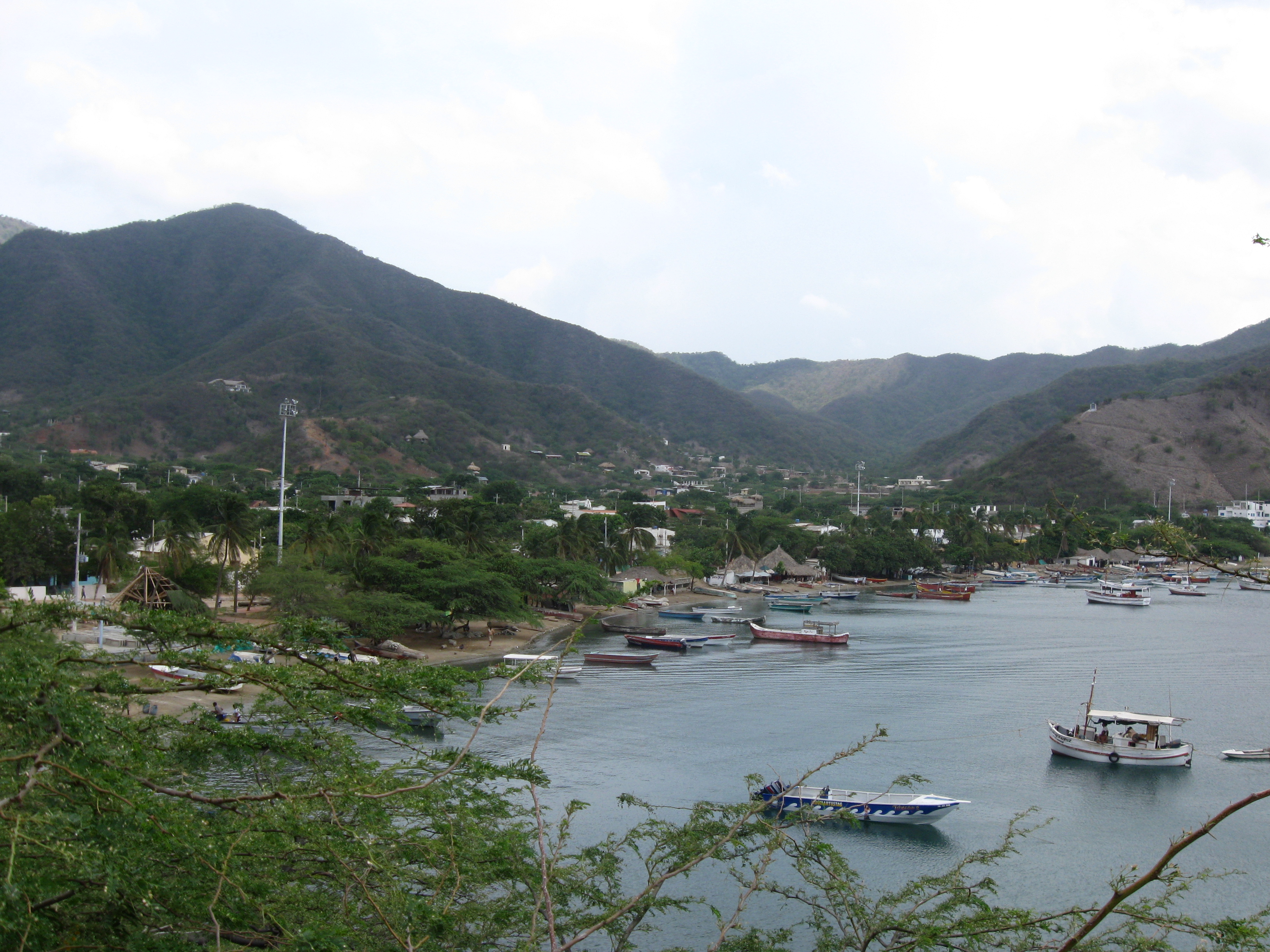
View of Taganga harbour from the north

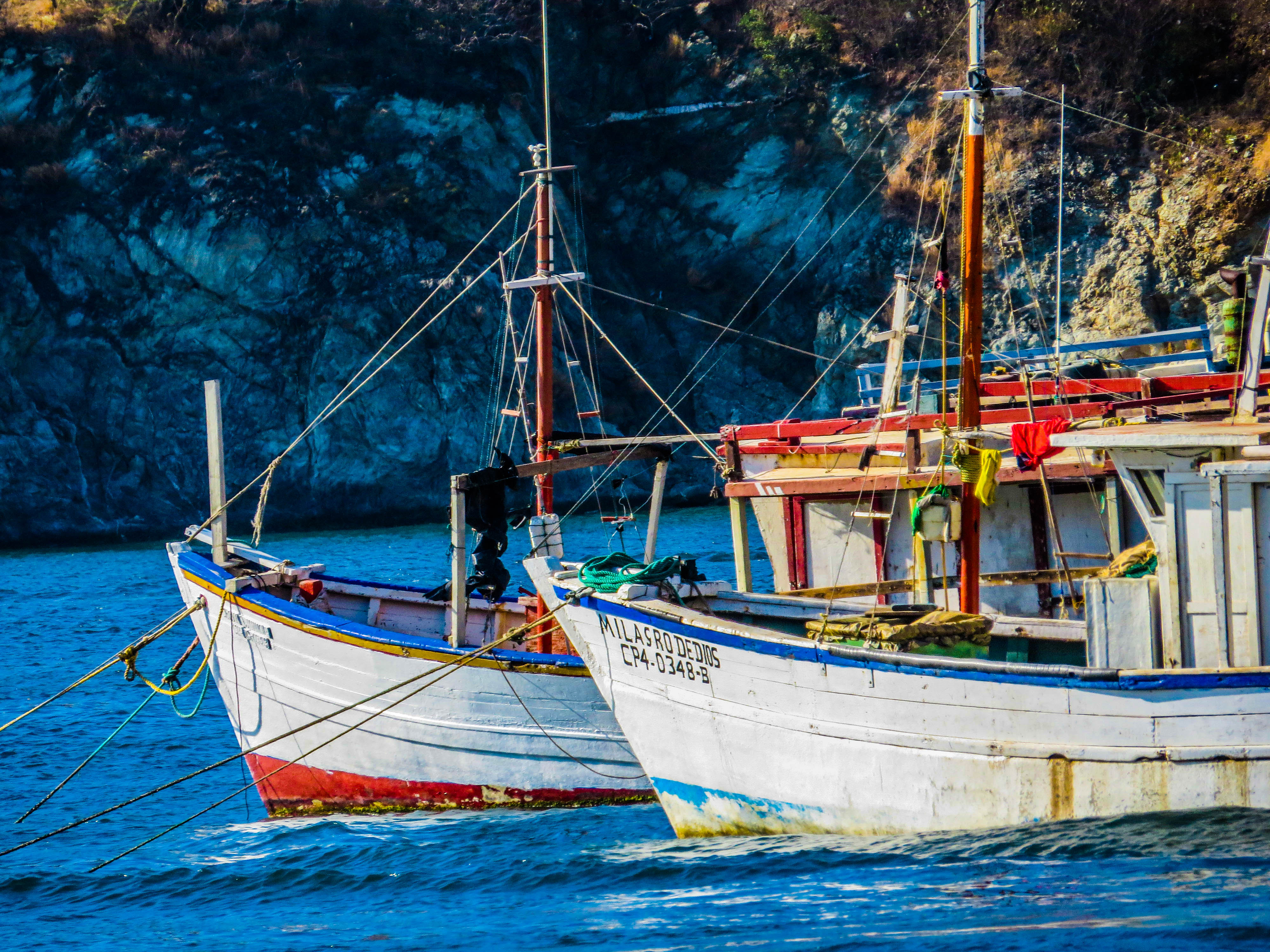
Fishing boats in Taganga harbour

== Panoramas ==
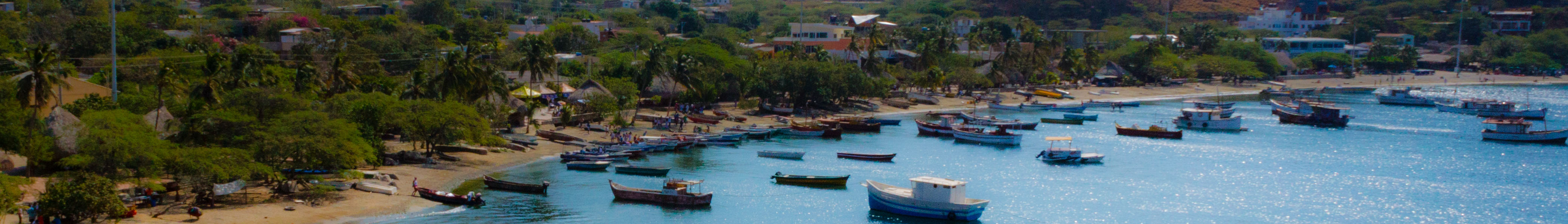
View of Taganga harbour, 2013
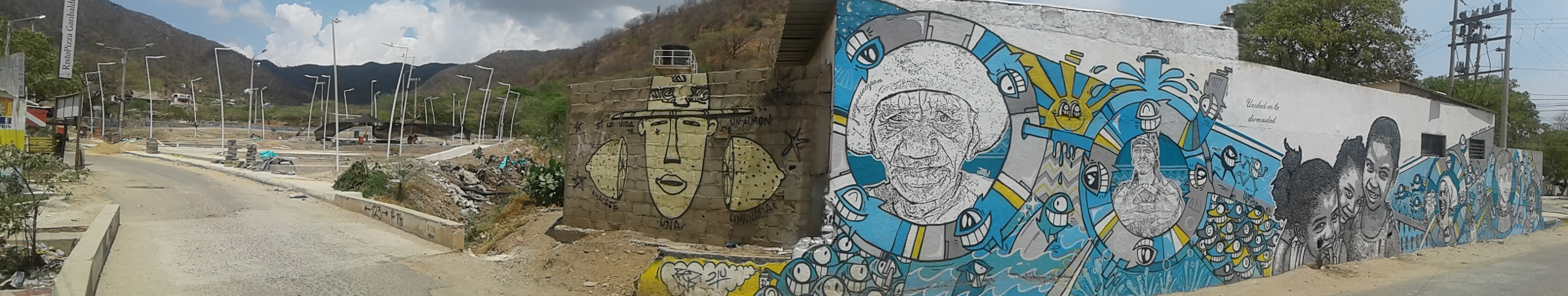
Park construction and Taganga mural, 2016

== See also ==
- Spanish conquest of the Muisca
- Ciudad Perdida, San Gil, Suesca, Tayrona National Natural Park

== Bibliography ==
- Caicedo Caballero, Karoll Lizbeth; Guarín Reyes, Erika Andrea (2011), Geología y petrología de las rocas metamórficas del sector comprendido entre las Bahías de Gaira y Taganga, Provincia tectónica de Santa Marta, Colombia - Geology and petrology of the metamorphic rocks of the sector between the Bays of Gaira and Taganga, tectonic province of Santa Marta, Colombia (in Spanish), Universidad Industrial de Santander, Bucaramanga, pp. 1–131
- Cuadrado González, Jeimy N. (2002), Caracterización de la estructura de las comunidades ícticas en las zonas arrecifales de Isla Aguja, Parque Nacional Natural Tayrona, Caribe Colombiano - Characterization of the ichtyofauna in the reef zones of Aguja Island, Tayrona National Park, Colombian Caribbean (PDF) (in Spanish), Universidad Javeriana, Bogotá, pp. 1–125
- Rodríguez Méndez, Nataly; Gaitán, Saeko; Chaparro, Nicolás (2006), "Evaluación del crecimiento de juveniles del Bagre Ariopsis bonillai utilizando alimento con probióticos en condiciones de laboratorio" [Evaluation of the growth of juvenile of Catfish Ariopsis bonillai using food with probiotics in laboratory conditions] (PDF), Revista AquaTIC (in Spanish), 24: 3–12, ISSN 1578-4541
- Sáenz Reyes, Julie Andrea (2011), Itinerario geológico de la franja costera entre el Aeropuerto Internacional Simón Bolívar y la Bahía de Taganga, Provincia geotectónica de Santa Marta - Geological itinerary of the coastal strip between the international airport Simón Bolívar and Taganga Bay, geotectonic province of Santa Marta (in Spanish), Universidad Industrial de Santander, Bucaramanga, pp. 1–282
- Various, authors (2010), Diccionario geográfico universal dedicado a la Reina Nuestra Señora - Universal geographic dictionary dedicated to Our Queen (in Spanish), Universidad Complutense, Madrid: Rev. José Torner, pp. 1–894
