= Tayrona National Natural Park =

Protected area in Colombia's north Caribbean region

Parque Natural Nacional Tayrona
- IUCN category II (national park)
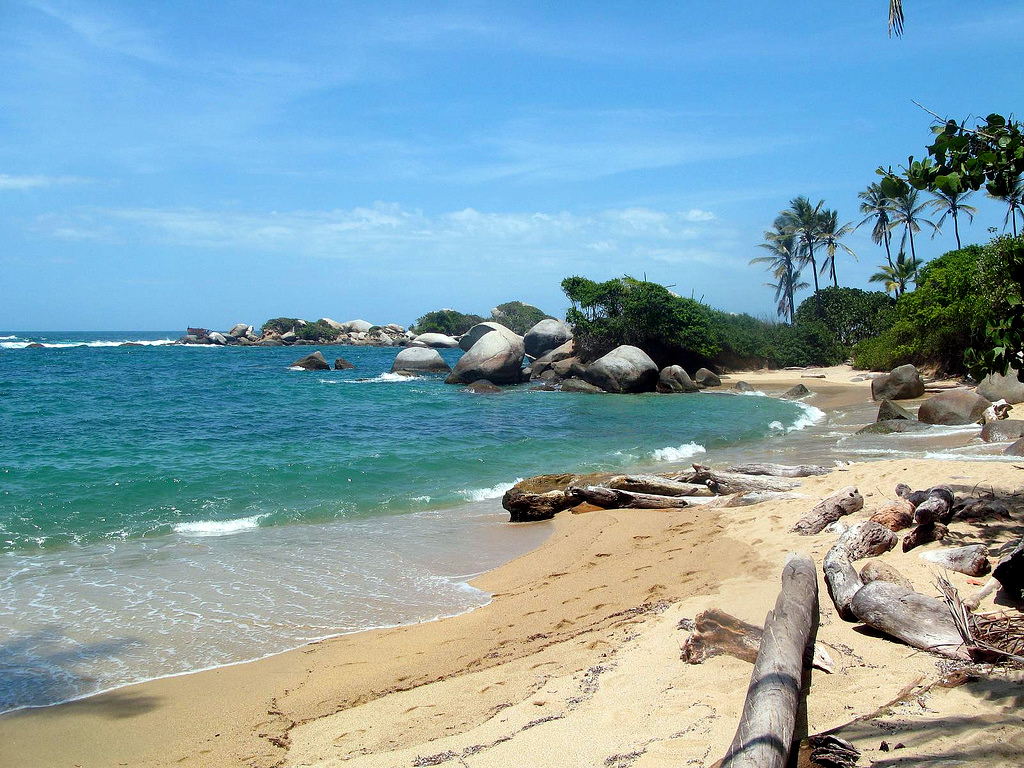

- Location within Colombia Location within the Caribbean
- Location: Santa Marta, Colombia
- Coordinates: 11°16′N 74°3′W
- Area: 150 km^{2} (58 sq mi)
- Established: April 24, 1964
- Governing body: SINAP

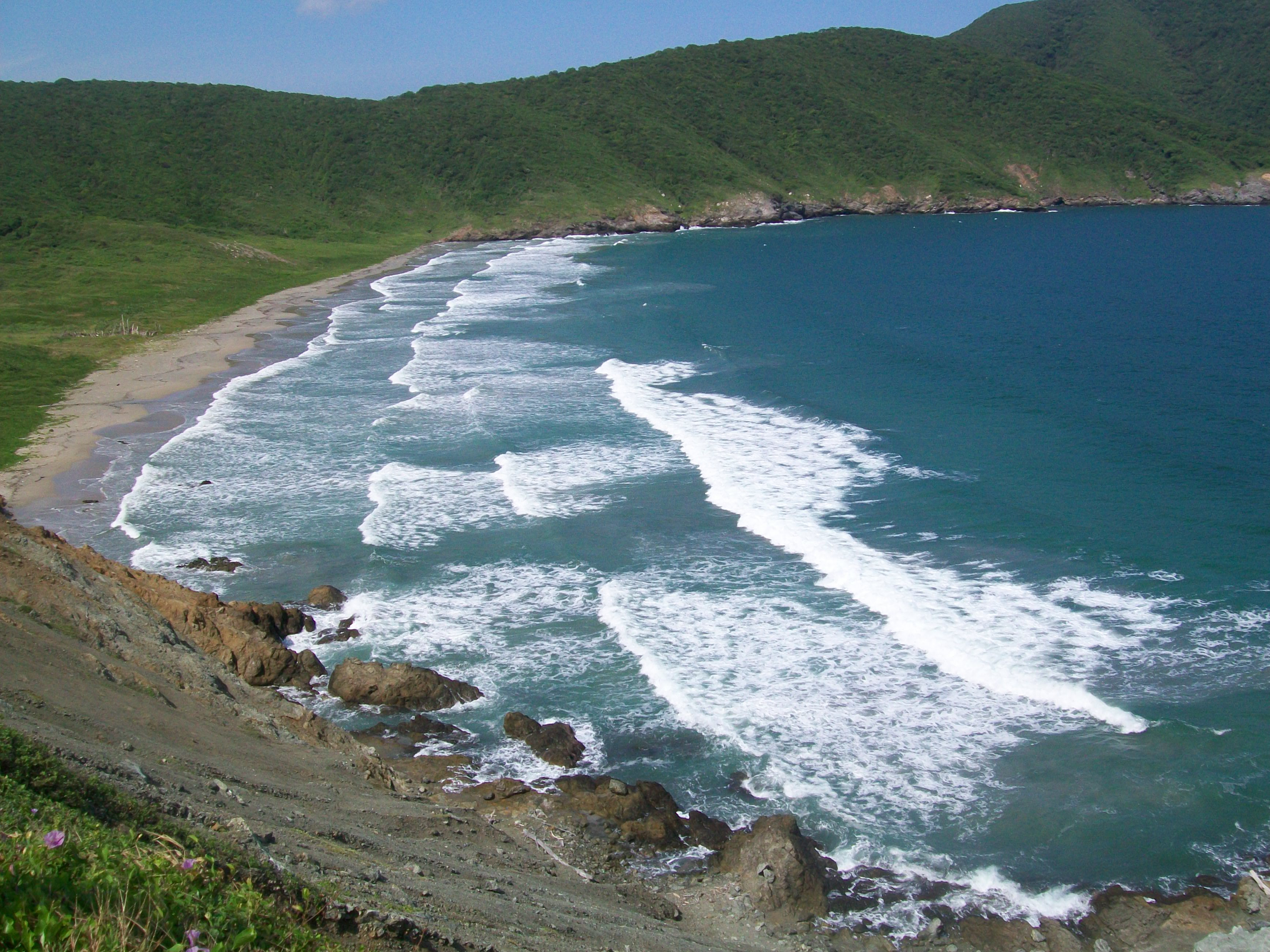
Playa Brava in Tayrona National Natural Park

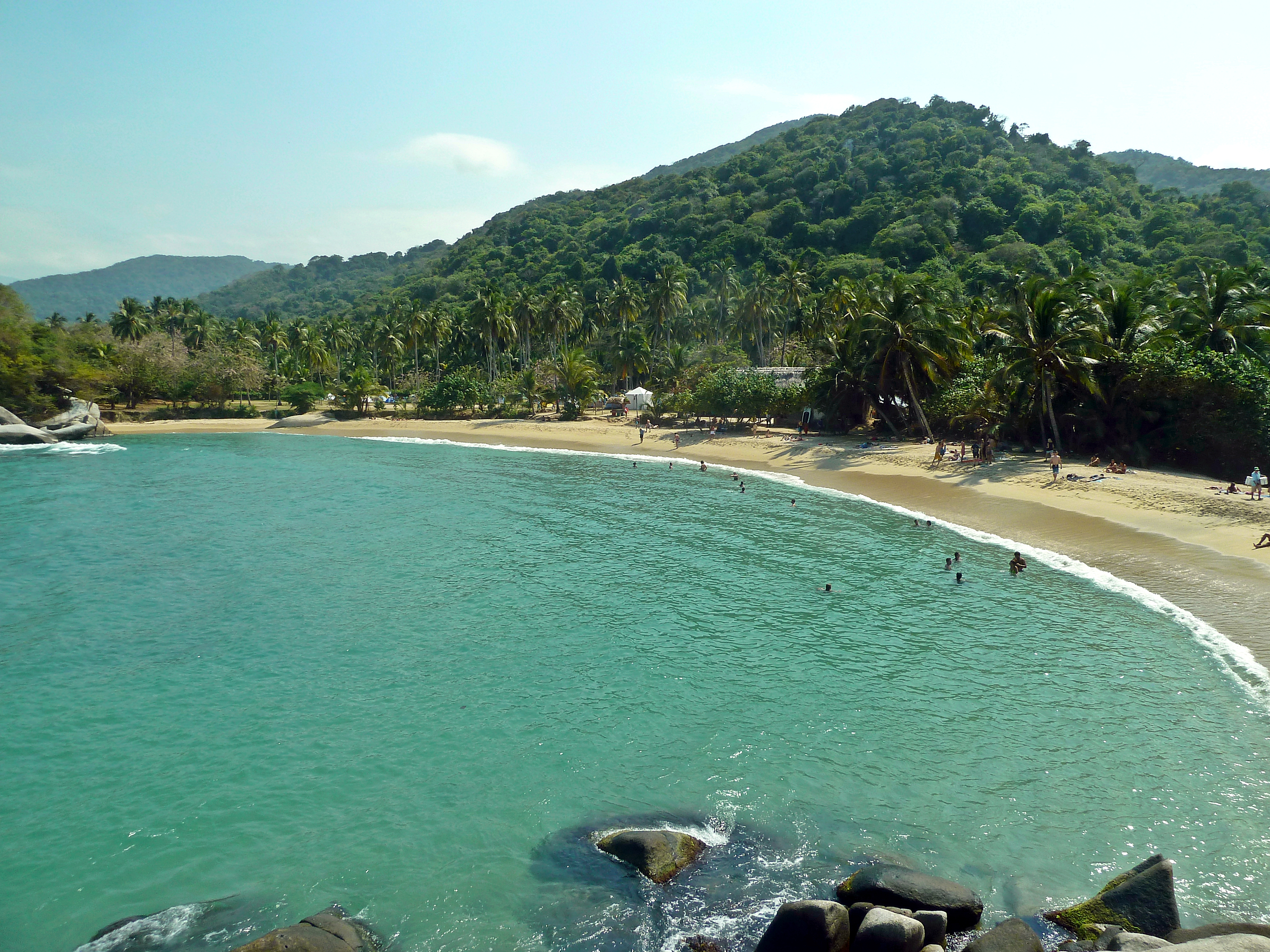
Cabo San Juan is one of the more popular swimming areas

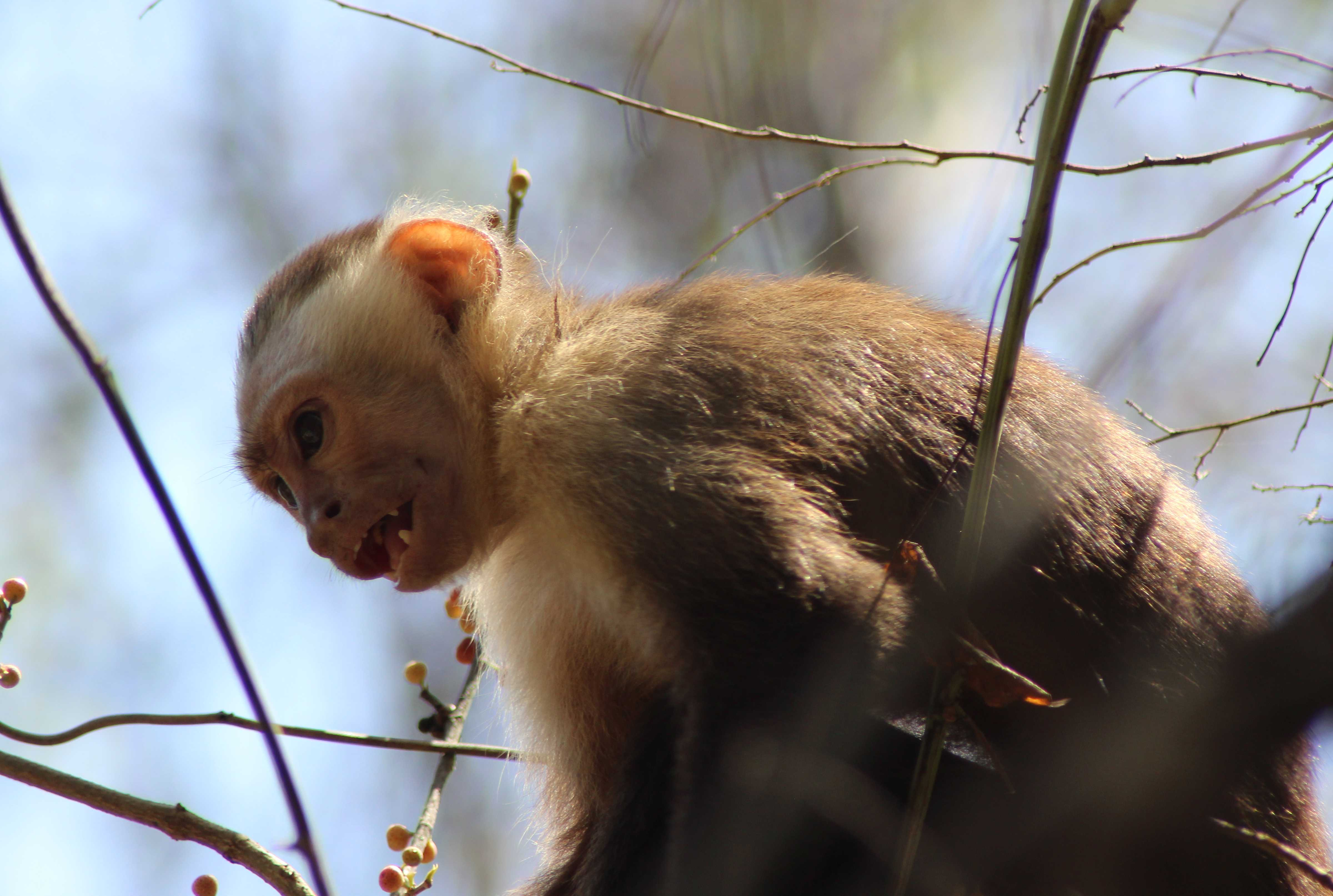
monkey living in the national park

The Tayrona National Natural Park (Spanish: Parque Nacional Natural Tayrona) is a protected area in the Colombian northern Caribbean region and within the jurisdiction of the city of Santa Marta, 34 kilometres (21 mi) from the city centre. The park presents a biodiversity endemic to the area of the Sierra Nevada de Santa Marta mountain range, featuring a variety of climates (mountain climate) and geography that ranges from arid sea level to 900 meters above sea level. The park covers approximately 30 square kilometres (12 sq mi) of maritime area in the Caribbean Sea and approximately 150 square kilometres (58 sq mi) of land.

It was the second most visited national park in Colombia in 2022, with 545,760 visitors.

== History ==
The Tayrona National Park was created by the 191st Law of the Colombian Institute for Agrarian Reform (INCORA), in order to guarantee the protection of the region and the preservation of the ecological environment.

== Geography ==
The park has an area of 150 square kilometres (58 sq mi). It is located in the jurisdiction of the Santa Marta city, in the Department of Magdalena, along the north coast of Colombia which borders on the Caribbean Sea.

Taganga is its most southern part; its western boundary goes toward the northeast following the coastline, including a kilometer of sea area, until the Piedras River. The boundary follows the left side of the river until the North Highway, and then toward the west, crossing the following places with clear demarcations in the terrain:

- Santa Rosa Hill
- Tovar Hill
- Guacamayo Pick
- Aguas Muertas Hill
- Cielito Pick
- Hondonada Site
- Humo Hill

It also crosses several creeks, like the Piedras River, Cañaveral, Santa Rosa, La Boquita, Cinto, and other water branches, including the Rodríguez and Gairaca creeks.

=== Climate ===
Temperatures in the park and surrounding citites range from 27 to 35 °C (81 to 95 °F) at sea level. Rainfall in this region varies from nothing to around 975 millimetres (38 in) per month, but overall the climate is tropical and hot, with agriculture requiring irrigation from streams that drain from the snowy peaks.

Climate data for Tayrona National Natural Park (1981–2010)
Month	Jan	Feb	Mar	Apr	May	Jun	Jul	Aug	Sep	Oct	Nov	Dec	Year
Record high °C (°F)	39.0 (102.2)	32.8 (91.0)	33.6 (92.5)	33.8 (92.8)	35.2 (95.4)	34.4 (93.9)	33.6 (92.5)	35.0 (95.0)	34.8 (94.6)	34.6 (94.3)	33.6 (92.5)	33.8 (92.8)	39.0 (102.2)
Mean daily maximum °C (°F)	29.3 (84.7)	29.4 (84.9)	29.6 (85.3)	29.8 (85.6)	30.4 (86.7)	30.9 (87.6)	31.0 (87.8)	31.3 (88.3)	31.4 (88.5)	31.0 (87.8)	30.4 (86.7)	29.6 (85.3)	30.4 (86.7)
Daily mean °C (°F)	25.1 (77.2)	25.4 (77.7)	25.7 (78.3)	26.4 (79.5)	26.9 (80.4)	27.2 (81.0)	27.0 (80.6)	27.1 (80.8)	27.0 (80.6)	26.6 (79.9)	26.5 (79.7)	25.6 (78.1)	26.4 (79.5)
Mean daily minimum °C (°F)	20.7 (69.3)	21.3 (70.3)	22.1 (71.8)	22.9 (73.2)	23.4 (74.1)	23.5 (74.3)	23.3 (73.9)	23.2 (73.8)	22.8 (73.0)	22.9 (73.2)	22.7 (72.9)	22.1 (71.8)	22.6 (72.7)
Record low °C (°F)	14.0 (57.2)	15.0 (59.0)	15.0 (59.0)	17.0 (62.6)	15.6 (60.1)	17.0 (62.6)	17.0 (62.6)	16.8 (62.2)	16.2 (61.2)	16.4 (61.5)	15.0 (59.0)	14.5 (58.1)	14.0 (57.2)
Average rainfall mm (inches)	33.8 (1.33)	32.7 (1.29)	29.3 (1.15)	105.6 (4.16)	138.4 (5.45)	70.4 (2.77)	70.3 (2.77)	106.3 (4.19)	175.0 (6.89)	266.3 (10.48)	211.9 (8.34)	154.2 (6.07)	1,248.4 (49.15)
Average rainy days	5	5	6	11	12	8	7	10	14	17	17	11	120
Average relative humidity (%)	87	86	86	85	87	87	86	87	88	90	90	89	87
Mean monthly sunshine hours	204.6	169.5	179.8	147.0	151.9	159.0	189.1	189.1	174.0	155.0	168.0	164.3	2,051.3
Mean daily sunshine hours	6.6	6.0	5.8	4.9	4.9	5.3	6.1	6.1	5.8	5.0	5.6	5.3	5.6
Source: Instituto de Hidrologia Meteorologia y Estudios Ambientales

== Flora and fauna ==
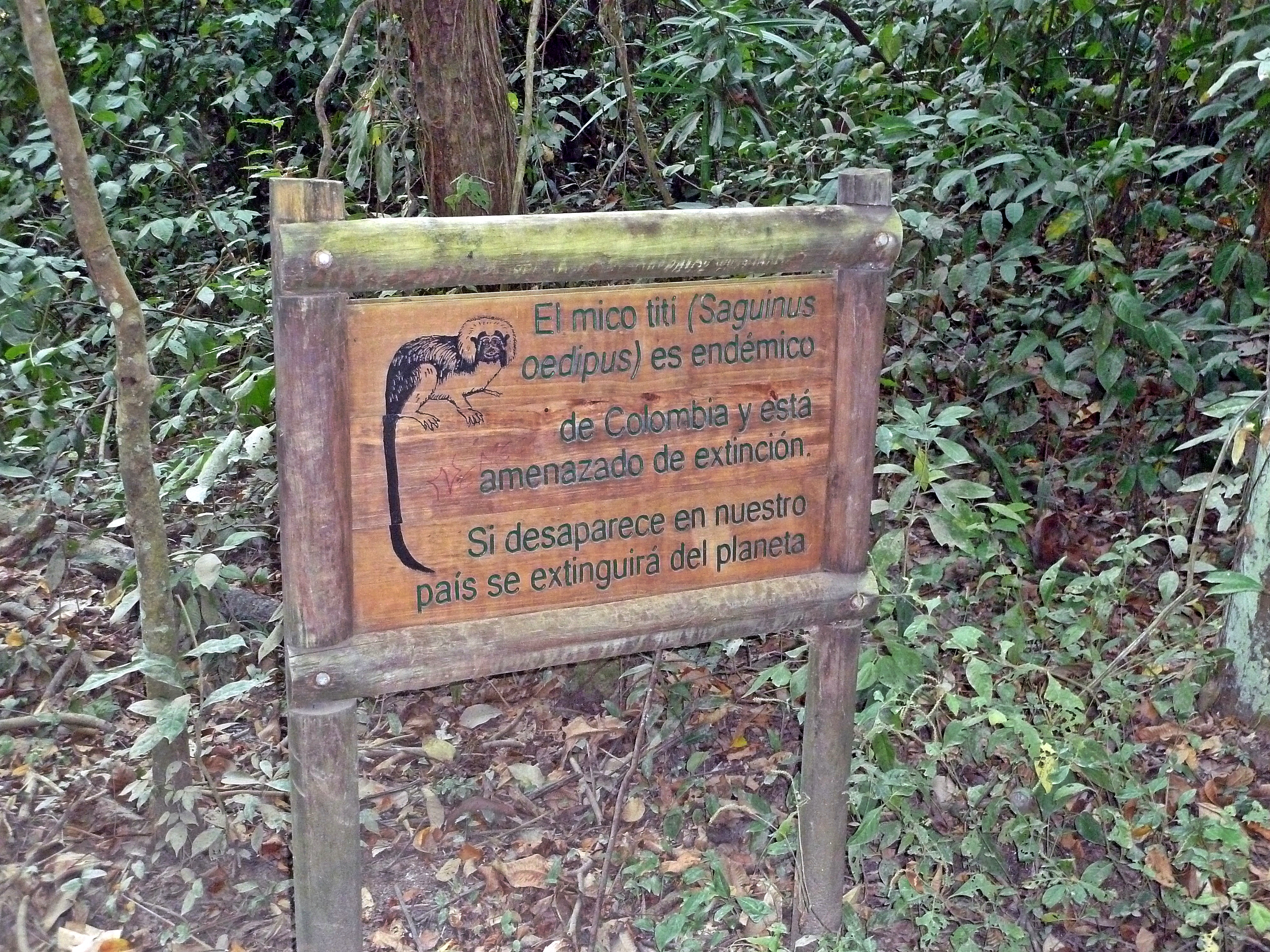
A sign in the park points out that this area is the last place in the world where the endangered cotton-top tamarin still exists

Scholars have done an extensive classification of animal species living in the park, which include about 108 species of mammals and 300 species of birds. The Mantled howler, the oncilla, deer and more than 70 species of bats are among the park's typical residents.

The park's 300 species of birds include the montane solitary eagle, the military macaw, black-backed antshrike, white-bellied antbird and the lance-tailed manakin. There are also approximately 31 species of reptiles, 15 species of amphibians, 202 species of sponges, 471 species of crustaceans, 96 species of annelids, 700 species of molluscs, 110 species of corals and 401 species of sea and river fish.

There are more than 350 algae and more than 770 species of plants.

It is one of three national parks in the Colombian Caribbean with coral reefs on its territories, the other two being Old Providence McBean Lagoon and Rosario and San Bernardo Corals.

== Archaeology ==
There is archaeological evidence of ancient human settlements in the area of the park up until the 16th century. The place now has facilities for the eco-tourism, with paths suitable for walks. The Archaeologic Museum of Chairama is located in the Cañaveral Site, near the mouth of the Piedras River. Other places which attract visitors are Los Naranjos Path, Castilletes Beach, The Pool, the Piedras River and the San Juan Out.

The site of El Pueblito was a popular hike has been closed since 2019 due to the wishes of the indigenous residents.

== Recreational scuba diving ==
Tayrona has protected sites off the shoreline popular for recreational scuba diving. The sites feature shallow areas used for training as well as areas with currents and depth suitable for drift diving.

== See also ==
- List of national parks of Colombia
- Taganga
