= Old Providence McBean Lagoon National Natural Park =

National park in Colombia

Parque Nacional Natural Old Providence McBean Lagoon
- Old Providence McBean Lagoon National Natural Park
- IUCN category II (national park)
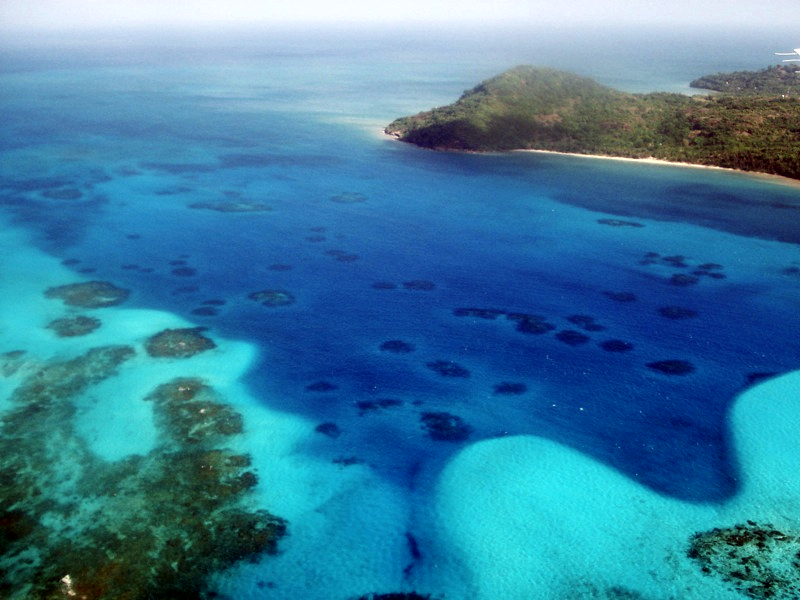

- Location within Colombia
- Coordinates: 13°21′0″N 81°22′30″W
- Area: 9.95 km^{2} (3.84 sq mi)
- Established: 1995; 31 years ago
- Governing body: SINAP

The Old Providence McBean Lagoon National Natural Park (Spanish: Parque Nacional Natural Old Providence McBean Lagoon) is a national park located on the northeast side of Providencia Island in the Archipelago of San Andrés, Providencia and Santa Catalina, Colombia.

It is one of three national parks in the Colombian Caribbean with coral reefs on its territories, the other two being Tayrona and Rosario and San Bernardo Corals.

== General ==
The area covers 9.95 km^{2} (3.84 sq mi) (of which 9.05 are maritime) and was declared a national park 1995, partly as a social defense against increased human activity in the form of time-sharing that would destroy a significant part of the area's mangroves.

The park contains different ecosystems, such as mangrove forests, coral formations, beds of marine grasses, and a small area of tropical dry forest. Due to the colorful coral reefs, the Providencia Island is also known as "The Sea of Seven Colors" (Spanish: El Mar de los Siete Colores). Crab Caye and the Three Brothers Cayes form four small islands that are part of the National Park.

Average yearly rainfall is 3000 mm, with the largest precipitation occurring in October–November. There is a dry period from January to June. Average temperature is 25 °C and relative humidity 73.3%.

== Flora and fauna ==
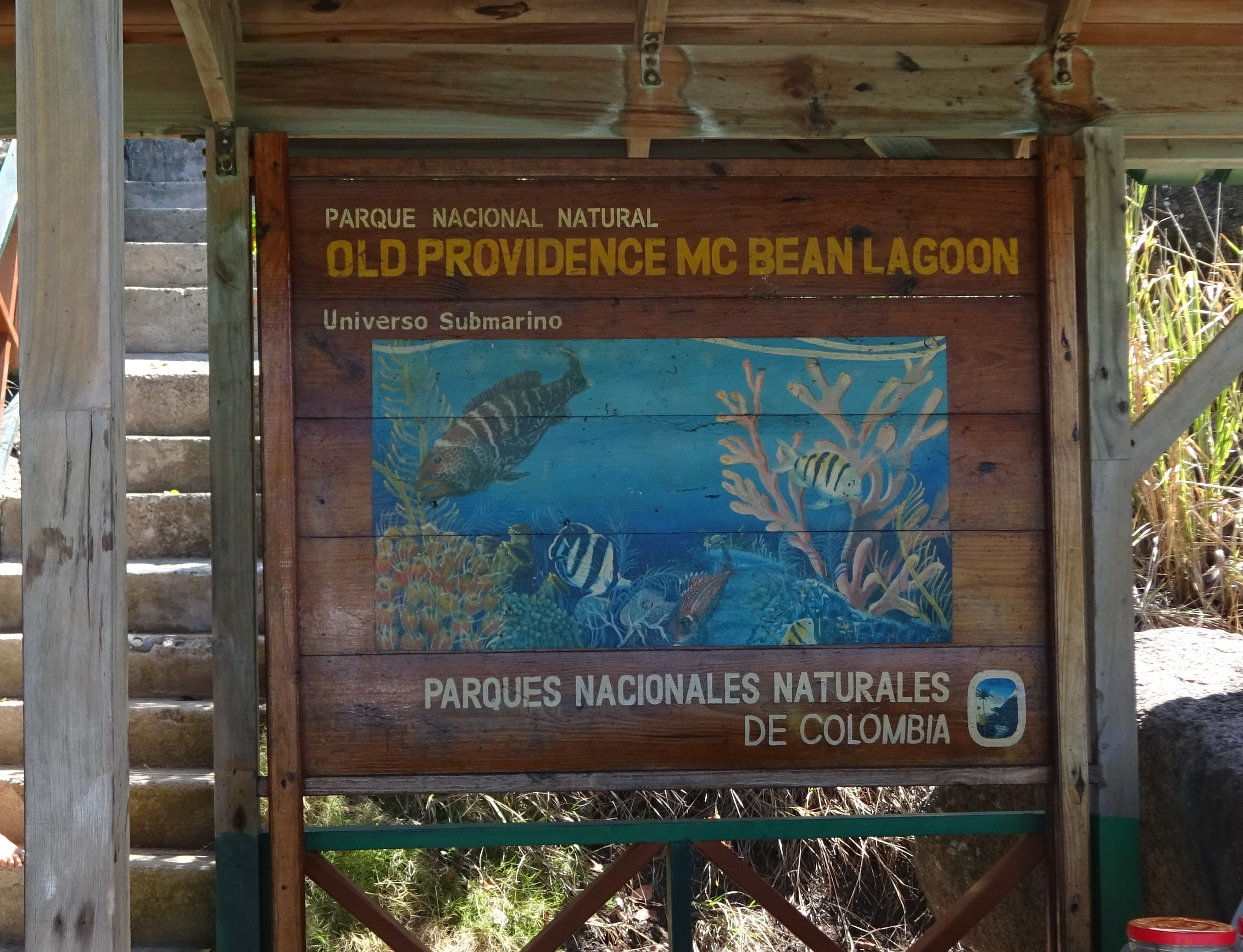
Park entry at Crab Cay

The mangroves range from 3 m (9.8 ft)–12 m (39 ft) in height. The predominant species is red mangrove and there are also smaller populations of black mangrove and white mangrove.

There are 74 recorded species of bird in the area. Noteworthy marine species include: Sargasso shearwater, magnificent frigatebird, brown booby and royal tern; non-marine: green heron and bananaquit (Coereba flaveola tricolor). The extensive area of marine grasses around the lagoon and bordering mangroves is made up of Thalassia testudinum and Syringodium filiforme.

== Tourism ==
A visitor centre on Crab Caye is accessible by boat. For conservation reasons, it is not permitted to access the other small islands that form part of the National Park.
