= Rosario and San Bernardo Corals National Natural Park =

National park in Colombia

Parque Nacional Natural Corales del Rosario y San Bernardo
- Rosario and San Bernardo Corals National Natural Park
- IUCN category II (national park)
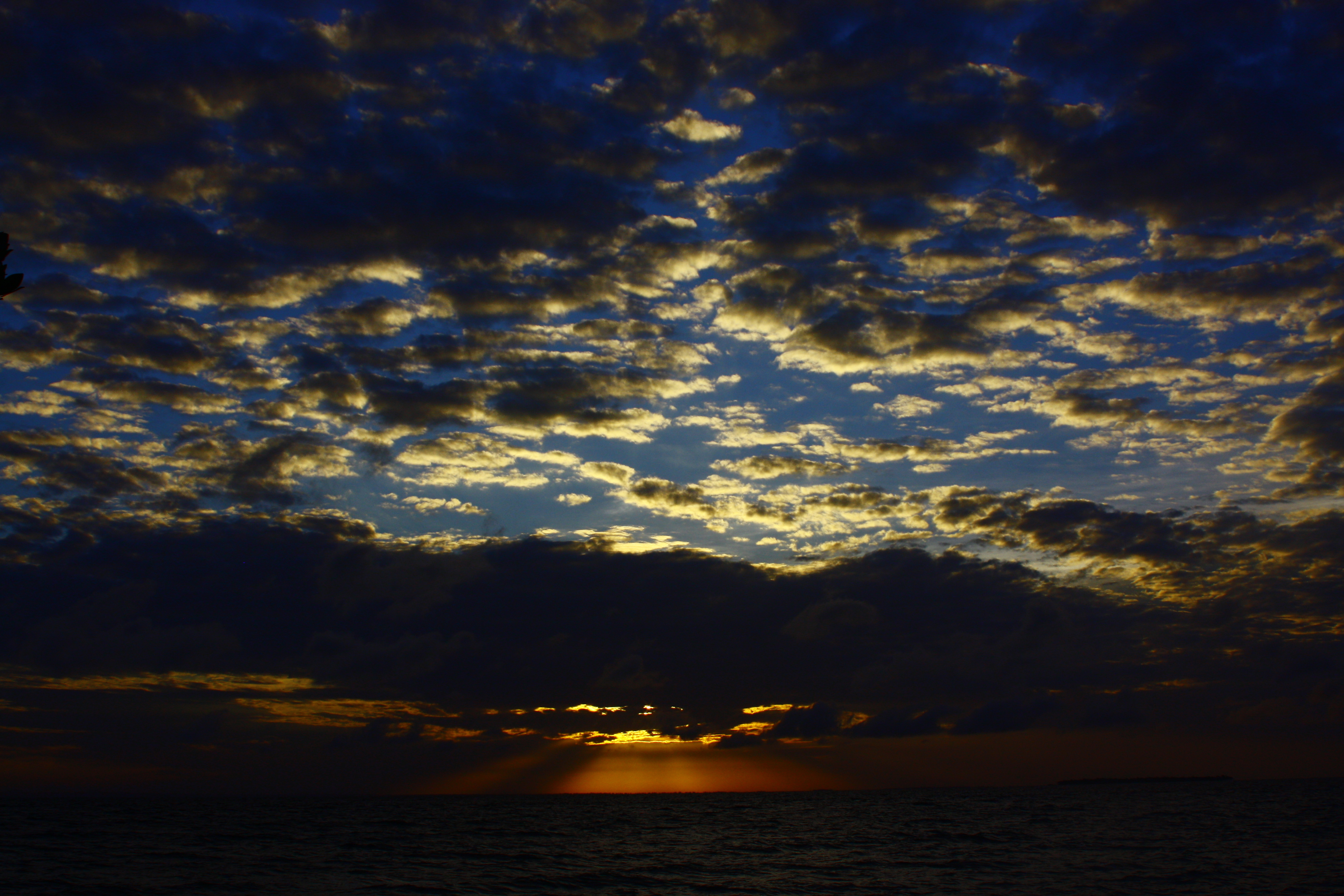
- Dawn in Tintipán

- Nearest city: Tolú, Colombia
- Coordinates: 10°10′N 75°45′W Islas del Rosario; 09°45′N 75°51′W Islas de San Bernardo
- Area: 1,200 km^{2} (460 sq mi)
- Established: May 1977
- Governing body: SINAP

The Rosario and San Bernardo Corals National Natural Park (Spanish: Parque Nacional Natural Corales del Rosario y San Bernardo) is a natural park located in the Sucre and Bolívar Departments on the coast of the Caribbean Region of Colombia, 45 km from the Bay of Cartagena. It was the most visited national park in Colombia in 2009, with 318,473 visitors.

Most of the park is underwater and it mainly protects marine ecosystems, including coral reefs living on depths ranging from one to 30 meters.

== General ==
It is Colombia's only underwater park, and one of three national parks in the Colombian Caribbean with coral reefs on its territories, the other two being Tayrona and Old Providence McBean Lagoon.

It was established in 1977 to protect the coral reef on one of the islands in the Islas del Rosario archipelago, originally extending 178 km^{2} (69 sq mi). In 1988, an area of 195 km^{2} (75 sq mi) was incorporated, and finally in 1996 the park was expanded to the present area, 1,200 km^{2} (460 sq mi), including Archipelago of San Bernardo.

The park is molded by the Caribbean and Panama currents, as well as freshwater from the Canal del Dique. Sediments brought from Magdalena River by the channel is having a negative effect of the park, as it deteriorates the reef. There are no bodies of freshwater in the park, but there is brackish water in some of the lagoons on the islands. Average yearly temperature is 27–30 °C.

== Flora and fauna ==
Most of the wildlife is marine. The park is home to 170 species of fish, 52 species of coral, 25 species of sponges, and hundreds of mollusc and crustacean species. The flora is characterized by mangroves and seagrass beds.
