= Biodiversity of Colombia =

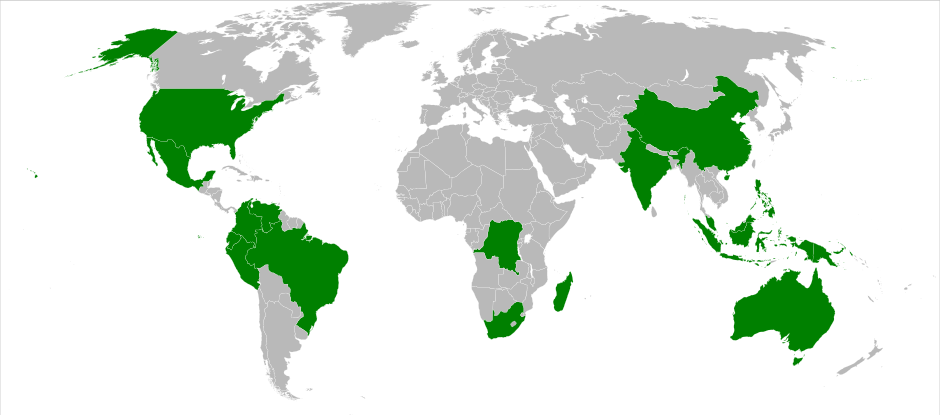
Colombia is one of seventeen megadiverse countries in the world.

The country hosts two biodiversity hotspots: 1 - Tropical Andes 5 - Tumbes-Chocó-Magdalena

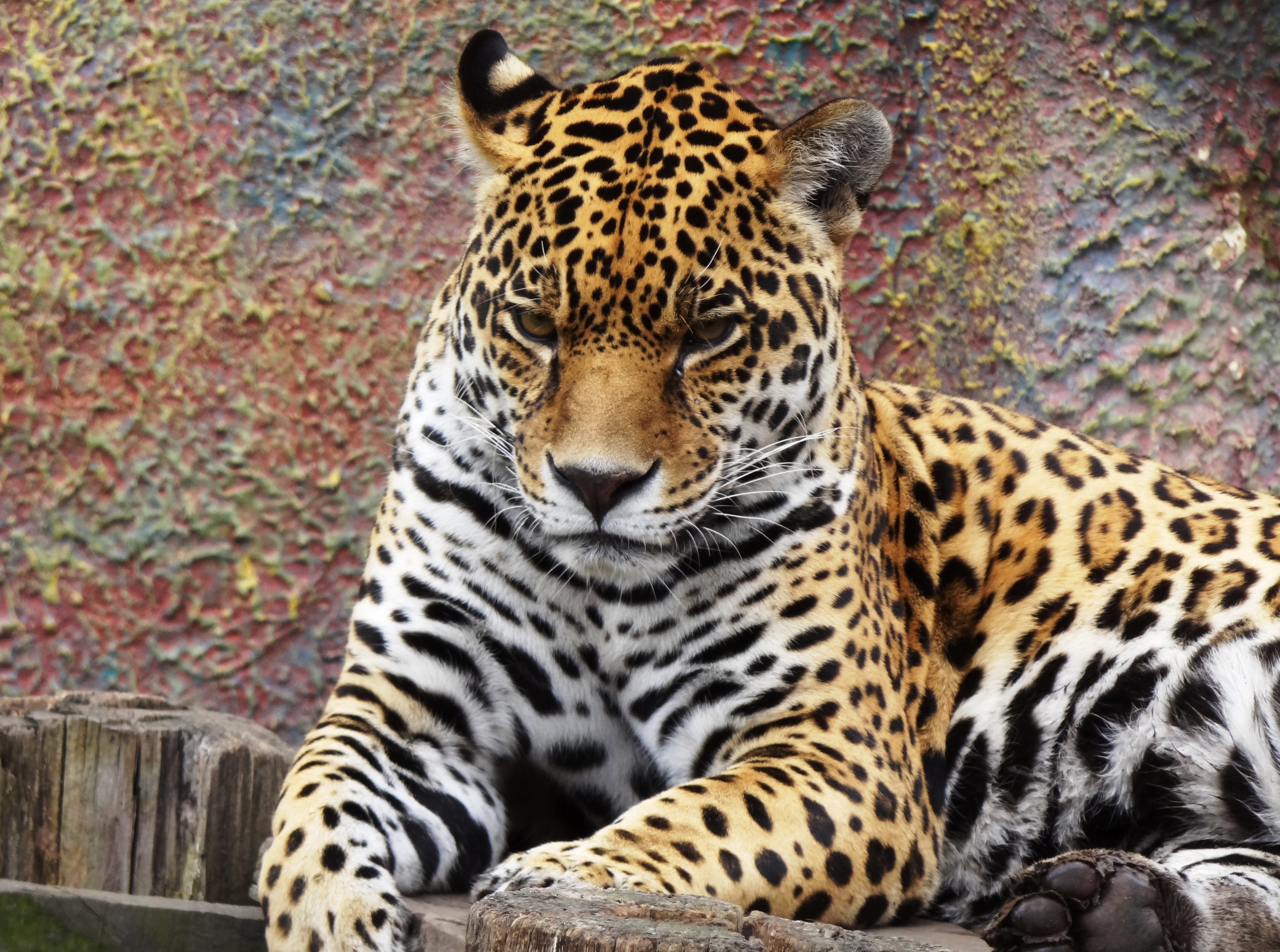
Jaguar in Jaime Duque Zoo, Tocancipá

The biodiversity of Colombia is the variety of indigenous organisms in the country with the second-highest biodiversity in the world. As of 2021, around 63,000 species are registered in Colombia, of which 14% are endemic. The country occupies worldwide the first position in number of orchids, birds and butterflies, second position in plants, amphibians and fresh water fish, third place in species of palm trees and reptiles and globally holds the sixth position in biodiversity of mammals.

The country hosts 59 nationally designated protected areas. At the establishment of the most recent addition, Bahía Portete – Kaurrele National Natural Park, Colombian president Juan Manuel Santos said "Biodiversity is to Colombia, what oil is for the Arabs".

In 2020, according to the Colombian Biodiversity Information System, 63,303 species were registered in the country, of which more than 8,800 are considered endemic species. The country occupies the first position in the world in number of orchid and bird species, second in plants, amphibians, butterflies and freshwater fish, third in palm and reptile species, and fourth in mammalian biodiversity.

According to a report by the WWF, half of Colombia's ecosystems are in a critical state of deterioration or in a state of danger. The organization said that environmental degradation is due to oil extraction, mineral and metal extraction and deforestation. Deteriorating ecosystems are threatening the existence of more than a third of Colombia's plants and 50 percent of its animals.

Since 1998, the Humboldt Institute for Biological Resources has been collecting biodiversity samples. As of 2014, 16,469 samples, representing around 2,530 species of 1,289 genera, and 323 families from Colombian biodiversity have been stored in its archives.

== Description ==
Colombia is one of seventeen megadiverse countries in the world. The country in northwestern South America contains 311 types of coastal and continental ecosystems. As of the beginning of 2021, a total of between 63,000 and 71,000 species are registered in the country, with 8803 endemic species, representing near the 14% of the total registered species. Colombia is the country with the most páramos in the world; more than 60% of the Andean ecosystem is found within Colombian territories. Boyacá is the department where 18.3% of the national total area is located. Since December 20, 2014, Colombia hosts 59 protected areas. The biodiversity is highest in the Andean natural region, followed by the Amazon natural region. Since 1998, the Humboldt Institute for Biological Resources in the country has been collecting samples of biodiversity. As of 2014, 16,469 samples, representing around 2530 species from 1289 genera, and 323 families of the Colombian biodiversity have been stored in their archives.

The biodiversity of Colombia is at risk, mainly because of habitat loss, urbanisation, deforestation and overfishing. According to a study of 2001, 260,000 hectares (640,000 acres) of forested area is lost every year. Around 1300 species are critically endangered, and 509 species are introduced in Colombia, 22 of which are classified as invasive species in Colombia. Various plans to address the environmental issues are proposed. The National System of Protected Areas (SINAP) is the administrator of protected areas.

=== Biodiversity in numbers ===
Class	Group	Pos	Species
Vertebrates	Mammals (list, primates)	4	492
Vertebrates	Birds (list, endemic)	1	1941
Vertebrates	Reptiles (list, lizards, snakes)	3	537
Vertebrates	Amphibians	2	803
Vertebrates	Marine fish		2000
Vertebrates	Freshwater fish (Magdalena River)		1435
Invertebrates (arthropods)	Lepidoptera (butterflies, moths)	1	3274
Invertebrates (arthropods)	Ants		900
Invertebrates (arthropods)	Marine molluscs		1250
Invertebrates (arthropods)	Marine sponges		1250
Invertebrates (arthropods)	Corals		139
Invertebrates (arthropods)	Marine decapods		560
Invertebrates (arthropods)	Echinoderms		296
Invertebrates (arthropods)	Terrestrial molluscs		650
Invertebrates (arthropods)	Beetles		7000
Invertebrates (arthropods)	Arachnids		1089
Invertebrates (arthropods)	Bees		398
Invertebrates (arthropods)	Diptera		3153
Flora (endemic)	Flowering plants		22,840
Flora (endemic)	Flowerless plants		45
Flora (endemic)	Orchids (endemic)	1	4270
Flora (endemic)	Ferns and relatives		1643
Flora (endemic)	Palm trees	3	289
Flora (endemic)	Mosses and relatives		1649
Algae	Terrestrial algae		1030
Algae	Marine algae		565
Fungi	Lichen		1674
Fungi	Macrofungi		1239
Fungi	Rusts		327
Fungi	Smuts		71

To commemorate the biodiversity of Colombia, the coins of the Colombian peso introduced in 2012 feature a species each.

=== Natural regions ===
Colombia is divided into six natural regions.

==== Caribbean natural region ====
Surface area	132,288 km^{2} (51,077 sq mi)	
Departments	Antioquia; Atlántico; Bolívar; Cesar; Córdoba; La Guajira; Magdalena; Sucre	
National parks	Bahía Portete; Ciénaga Grande; Los Colorados; Corales de Profundidad; Corales del Rosario; El Corchal; Los Flamencos; Macuira; Paramillo; Playona Acandí; Salamanca Island; S.N. de Santa Marta; Tayrona	
Biodiversity	aquatic birds	165
Biodiversity	amphibians	39
Biodiversity	reptiles	129
Biodiversity	plants	3151
Biodiversity	fish	109
References		

==== Andean natural region ====
Surface area	282,540 km^{2} (109,090 sq mi)	
Departments	Antioquia; Boyacá; Caldas; Cauca; Cesar; Chocó; Cundinamarca; Huila; Nariño; Norte de Santander; Quindío; Risaralda; Santander; Tolima; Valle del Cauca	
National parks	Catatumbo Barí; Chingaza; El Cocuy; Corota; Cueva de los Guácharos; Doña Juana-Cascabel; Los Estoraques; Galeras; Guanentá; Las Hermosas; Iguaque; Nevado del Huila; Los Nevados; Las Orquídeas; Otún Quimbaya; Pisba; Puracé; Selva de Florencia; Sumapaz; Tamá; Tatamá; Yariguíes	
Biodiversity	aquatic birds	14
Biodiversity	amphibians	485
Biodiversity	reptiles	220
Biodiversity	plants	11,500
Biodiversity	fish	197
References		

==== Orinoquía natural region ====
Surface area	285,437 km^{2} (110,208 sq mi)	
Departments	Arauca; Casanare; Meta; Vichada	
National parks	La Macarena; Los Picachos; Tinigua; El Tuparro	
Biodiversity	aquatic birds	92
Biodiversity	amphibians	57
Biodiversity	reptiles	119
Biodiversity	plants	2692
Biodiversity	fish	619
References		

==== Amazon natural region ====
Surface area	483,911 km^{2} (186,839 sq mi)	
Departments	Amazonas; Caquetá; Guainía; Guaviare; Putumayo; Vaupés; Vichada	
National parks	Alto Fragua; Indi-Wasi; Amacayacu; Cahuinarí; Chiribiquete; Nukak; La Paya; Puinawai; Río Puré; Churumbelos; Tinigua	
Biodiversity	aquatic birds	74
Biodiversity	amphibians	158
Biodiversity	reptiles	195
Biodiversity	plants	5300
Biodiversity	fish	675
References		

==== Pacific/Chocó natural region ====
Surface area	83,170 km^{2} (32,110 sq mi)	
Departments	Cauca; Chocó; Nariño; Valle del Cauca	
National parks	Los Katíos; Sanquianga; Uramba Bahía Málaga; Utría	
Biodiversity	aquatic birds	142
Biodiversity	amphibians	154
Biodiversity	reptiles	177
Biodiversity	plants	4525
Biodiversity	fish	164
References		

==== Insular natural region ====
Surface area	300 km^{2} (120 sq mi)	
Departments	Bolívar; Cauca; San Andrés y Providencia; Valle del Cauca	
National parks	Corales del Rosario; Malpelo; Old Providence; Gorgona	
Biodiversity	Corales del Rosario y San Bernardo	
Biodiversity	fish	170
Biodiversity	corals	52
Biodiversity	sponges	25
Biodiversity	molluscs & crustaceans	100s
Biodiversity	Gorgona Island	
Biodiversity	fish	Pseudobatos prahli
Biodiversity	fish	Trichomycterus gorgona
Biodiversity	Malpelo Island	
Biodiversity	fish	Acanthemblemaria stephensi
Biodiversity	fish	Halichoeres malpelo
Biodiversity	Old Providence Lagoon	
Biodiversity	birds	74
References		

== Biodiversity hotspots ==
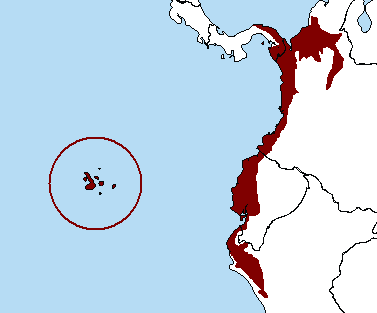
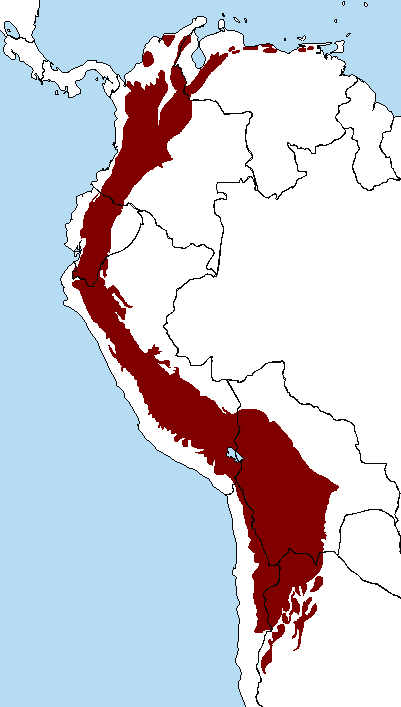
Biodiversity hotspots of Tumbes-Chocó-Magdalena (left) and Tropical Andes (right)

Colombia hosts two biodiversity hotspots; the Tropical Andes and Tumbes–Chocó–Magdalena. The country is part of the World Network of Biosphere Reserves with five biosphere reserves:

Name	Since	First review	Second review	Image	Notes
Cinturón Andino	1979	2001	2011		
El Tuparro	1979	2001	2011		
Sierra Nevada de Santa Marta	1979	2001	2011		
Ciénaga Grande de Santa Marta	2000	2011			
Seaflower	2000	2011			

== Species ==
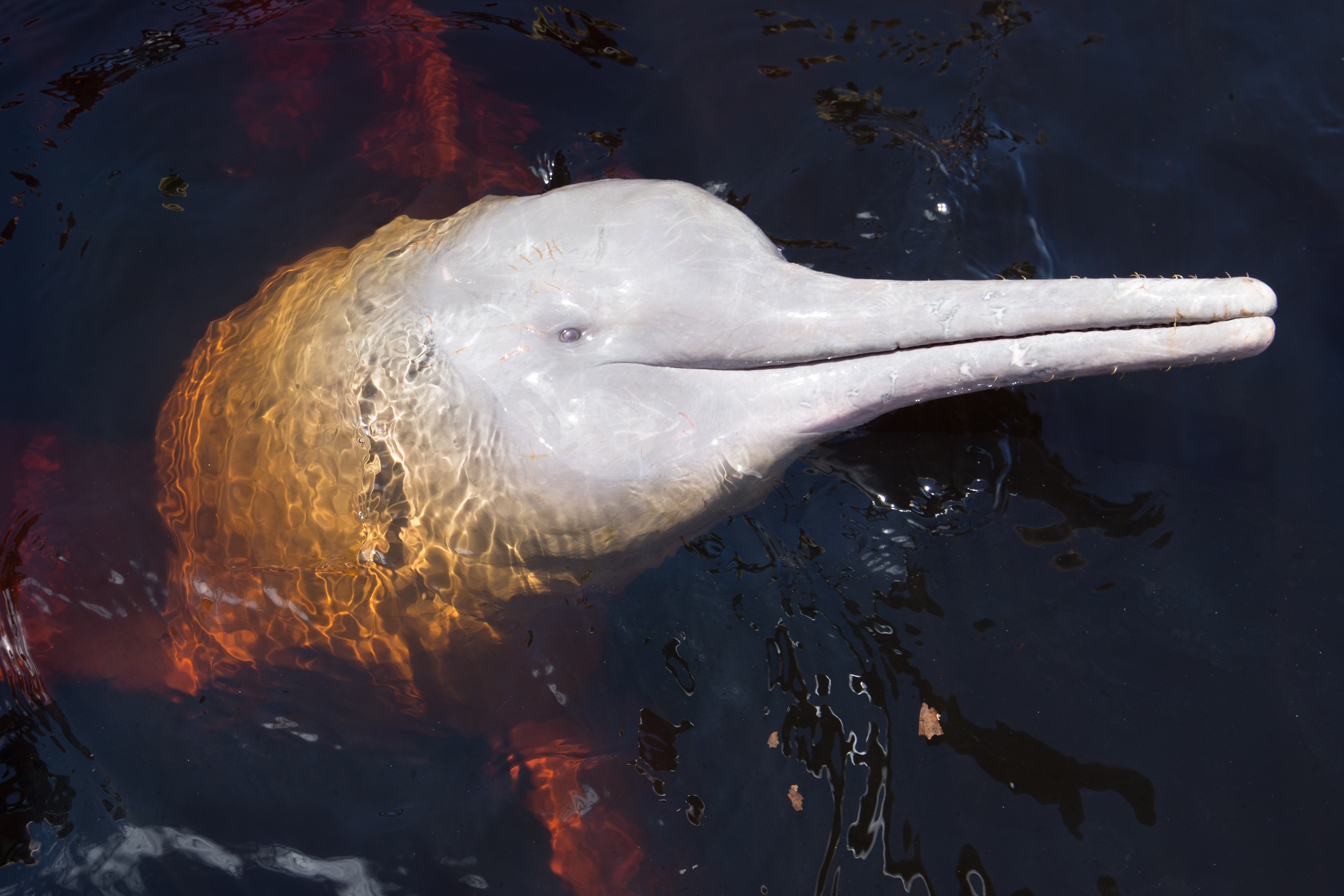
The Amazon river dolphin inhabits the southeastern Amazon region of Colombia.

=== Selected fauna ===
Name	Species	Image
Caquetá titi	Callicebus caquetensis	
cotton-top tamarin	Saguinus oedipus	
mountain tapir	Tapirus pinchaque	
ornate titi	Callicebus ornatus	
spectacled bear	Tremarctos ornatus	
white-footed tamarin	Saguinus leucopus	
	Santamartamys	
American flamingo	Phoenicopterus ruber	
Andean condor	Vultur gryphus	
blue-billed curassow	Crax alberti	
Colombian chachalaca	Ortalis columbiana	
Crested caracara	Caracara plancus	
great egret	Ardea alba	
green-bearded helmetcrest	Oxypogon guerinii	
indigo-capped hummingbird	Amazilia cyanifrons	
little blue heron	Egretta caerulea	
multicoloured tanager	Chlorochrysa nitidissima	
snowy egret	Egretta thula	
white-tailed starfrontlet	Coeligena phalerata	
blue anole	Anolis gorgonae	
Magdalena River turtle	Podocnemis lewyana	
rainbow whiptail	Cnemidophorus lemniscatus	
spectacled caiman	Caiman crocodilus	
	Norops mariarum	
Andean poison frog	Andinobates opisthomelas	
Boettger's Colombian treefrog	Dendropsophus columbianus	
golden poison frog	Phyllobates terribilis	
Guajira stubfoot toad	Atelopus carrikeri	
harlequin poison frog	Oophaga histrionica	
Lehmann's poison frog	Oophaga lehmanni	
	Pristimantis tayrona	
green discus	Symphysodon tarzoo	
redhump eartheater	Geophagus steindachneri	
spotted moray	Gymnothorax moringa	
Malpelo barnacle blenny	Acanthemblemaria stephensi	
Malpelo wrasse	Halichoeres malpelo	
	Centrochir crocodili	
	Hoplosternum magdalenae	
	Labrisomus dendriticus	
	Sturisoma aureum	
Clysonymus longwing	Heliconius clysonymus	
Dirce beauty	Colobura dirce	
brown peacock	Anartia amathea	
eleone white	Leptophobia eleone	
short-lined kite swallowtail	Protographium agesilaus	
	Rhetus arcius	
	Mastigoproctus colombianus	
	Psammodesmus bryophorus	
giant ramshorn snail	Marisa cornuarietis	
Portuguese man o' war	Physalia physalis	
sea slug		

=== Selected endemic flora ===
Name	Species	Image
	Cattleya trianae national flower	
wax palm	Ceroxylon quindiuense national tree	
lulo	Solanum quitoense national fruit	
borojó	Alibertia patinoi	
	Ancipitia anthrax	
	Comparettia macroplectron	
	Dracula bella	
	Dracula diabola	
	Dracula lotax	
	Erythroxylum novogranatense	
frailejón	Espeletia killipii	
	Heliconia bourgaeana	
	Hypericum myricariifolium	
	Ipomoea pes-caprae	
	Lepanthes ophelma	
	Lupinus alopecuroides	
	Masdevallia mejiana	
	Miconia salicifolia	
	Monnina salicifolia	
	Odontoglossum crispum	
	Opuntia wentiana	
	Paphinia rugosa	
	Paphinia seegeri	
	Passiflora loefgrenii	
	Pentacalia vernicosa	
	Phragmipedium schlimii	
color-changing restrepia	Restrepia chameleon	
copper-coloured restrepia	Restrepia cuprea	
	Restrepia nittiorhyncha	
	Restrepia pandurata	
	Senecio formosoides	
	Stanhopea platyceras	
	Stanhopea pozoi	
	Stanhopea shuttleworthii	
	Stanhopea stevensonii	

=== Selected endemic fungi ===
Name	Species	Image
	Cookeina tricholoma	
	Favolus brasiliensis	
	Oudemansiella platensis	

== Panoramas ==
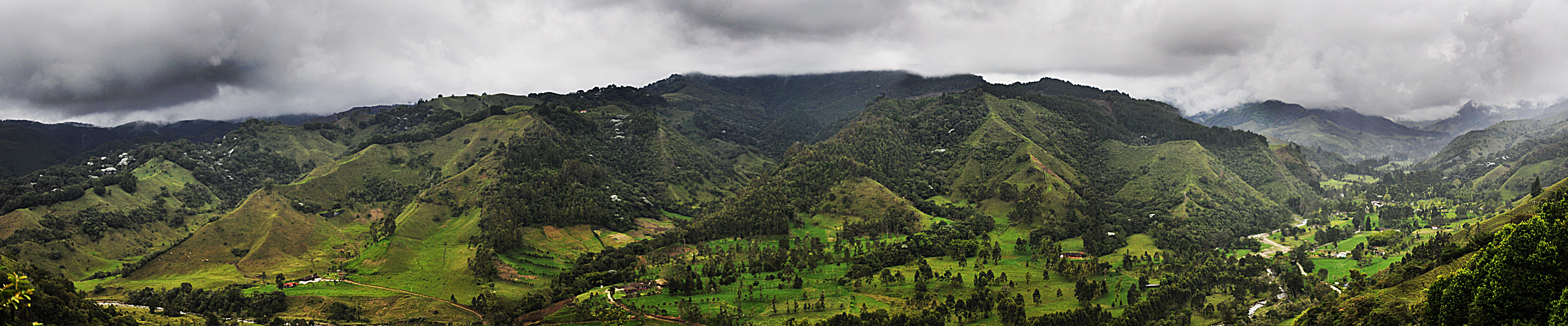
Cocora valley, Quindío
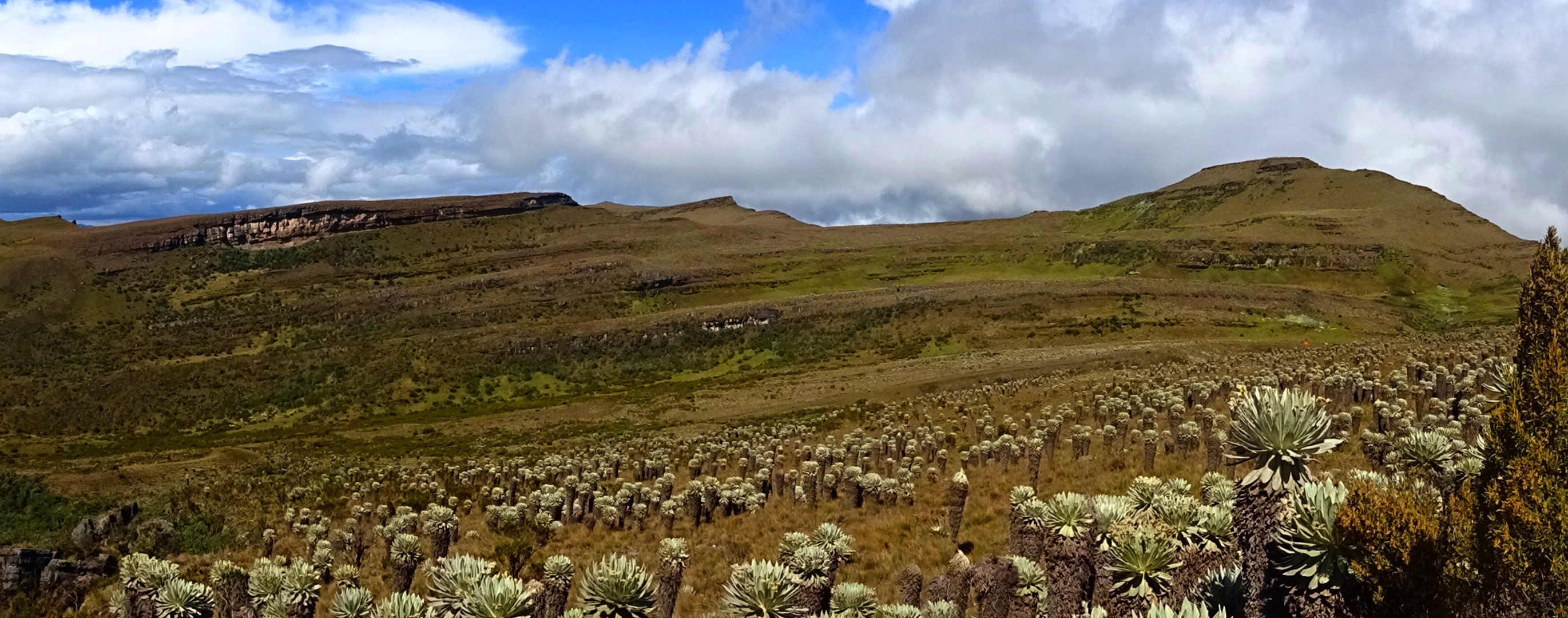
Ocetá Páramo, Boyacá

== See also ==
- Biodiversity of the Eastern Hills, Bogotá
- Conservation biology
- Biodiversity of Thomas van der Hammen Natural Reserve
- Biodiversity of Cape Town, New Caledonia, New Zealand
- Biodiversity of Borneo, environmental issues in Colombia
- Environmental personhood
