= List of national parks of Colombia =

National Parks of Colombia
- Parques Nacionales de Colombia
- Location: Colombia
- Area: 169,545 km^{2} (65,462 sq mi)
- Established: 1960
- Governing body: Ministry of Environment
- Administrator: SINAP
- Website: Official website

The protected areas of Colombia are grouped into the National System of Protected Areas. As of 2018, there are 59 nationally protected areas which cover about 169,545 km^{2} (65,462 sq mi) and represent more than 14% of the country's area.

== National Natural Park System ==
The National Natural Park System is divided into the following categories:

- National Natural Parks (Parque Natural Nacional - PNN): 43
- Fauna and Flora Sanctuaries (Sanctuario de Flora y Fauna - SFF): 12
- National Natural Reserves (Reserva Natural Nacional - RNN): 2
- Unique Natural Areas (Área Natural Única - ANU): 1
- Road park (Vía Parque): 1

== List of Nationally Protected Areas ==
National Natural Parks of Colombia
Image	Name	Region	Subregion	Departments	Area (ha)	Established	Notes
	PNN Cueva de los Guácharos	Andean	Eastern Ranges	Huila	9,000	1960	
	PNN Sierra Nevada de Santa Marta	Caribbean		Magdalena; La Guajira; Cesar	383,000	1964	
	Salamanca Island Road Park	Caribbean		Magdalena	56,200	1964	
	PNN Farallones de Cali	Andean	Western Ranges	Valle del Cauca	150,000	1968	
	PNN Puracé	Andean	Central Ranges	Cauca; Huila	83,000	1968	
	PNN Tayrona	Caribbean		Magdalena	15,000	1969	
	PNN El Tuparro	Orinoquía		Vichada	548,000	1970	
	PNN Serranía de la Macarena	Orinoquía		Meta	620,000	1971	
	PNN Las Orquídeas	Andean	Western Ranges	Antioquia	32,000	1973	
	PNN Los Katíos	Pacific		Chocó; Antioquia	72,000	1973	
	PNN Los Nevados	Andean	Central Ranges	Risaralda; Tolima; Caldas; Quindío	58,300	1973	
	PNN Amacayacu	Amazon		Amazonas	293,500	1975	
	PNN Las Hermosas	Andean	Central Ranges	Tolima; Valle del Cauca	125,000	1977	
	PNN Nevado del Huila	Andean	Central Ranges	Huila; Tolima; Cauca; Valle del Cauca	158,000	1977	
	PNN Cordillera de los Picachos	Andean	Eastern Ranges	Meta; Caquetá; Huila	444,740	1977	
	PNN Chingaza	Andean	Eastern Ranges	Cundinamarca; Meta	76,600	1977	
	PNN Sumapaz	Andean	Eastern Ranges	Cundinamarca; Meta; Huila	154,000	1977	
	PNN Sierra Nevada del Cocuy	Andean	Eastern Ranges	Arauca; Boyacá; Casanare	306,000	1977	
	PNN Pisba	Andean	Eastern Ranges	Boyacá	45,000	1977	
	PNN Tamá	Andean	Eastern Ranges	Norte de Santander	15,000	1977	
	SFF Iguaque	Andean	Eastern Ranges	Boyacá	6,750	1977	
	PNN Corales del Rosario y San Bernardo	Caribbean		Bolívar; Sucre	120,000	1977	
	SFF Ciénaga Grande de Santa Marta	Caribbean		Magdalena	26,810	1977	
	PNN Sanquianga	Pacific		Nariño	80,000	1977	
	PNN Macuira	Caribbean		La Guajira	25,000	1977	
	PNN Paramillo	Andean	Western Ranges	Córdoba; Antioquia	460,000	1977	
	PNN Munchique	Andean	Western Ranges	Cauca	44,000	1977	
	SFF Los Colorados	Caribbean		Bolívar	1,000	1977	
	SFF Isla de La Corota	Andean	Central Ranges	Nariño	16	1977	
	SFF Los Flamencos	Caribbean		La Guajira	7,682	1977	
	PNN Isla Gorgona	Insular		Cauca	61,687	1983	
	PNN La Paya	Amazon		Putumayo	422,000	1984	
	SFF Galeras	Andean	Nudo de los Pastos	Nariño	7,615	1985	
	PNN Cahuinarí	Amazon		Amazonas	575,000	1986	
	PNN Utría	Pacific		Chocó	54,300	1987	
	PNN Tatamá	Andean	Western Ranges	Chocó; Risaralda; Valle del Cauca	51,900	1987	
	ANU Los Estoraques	Andean	Eastern Ranges	Norte de Santander	640	1988	
	PNN Serranía de Chiribiquete	Amazon		Caquetá; Guaviare	4,268,095	1989	
	RNN Nukak	Amazon		Guaviare; Vaupés	855,000	1989	
	RNN Puinawai	Amazon		Guainía	1,092,500	1989	
	PNN Tinigua	Amazon		Meta	201,875	1989	
	PNN Catatumbo Barí	Andean	Eastern Ranges	Norte de Santander	158,125	1989	
	SFF Guanentá Alto Río Fonce	Andean	Eastern Ranges	Santander	10,429	1993	
	PNN Old Providence McBean Lagoon	Insular		San Andrés y Providencia	995	1995	
	SFF Malpelo	Insular		Valle del Cauca	120	1995	
	SFF Otún Quimbaya	Andean	Central Ranges	Risaralda	489	1996	
	PNN Río Puré	Amazon		Amazonas	999,880	2002	
	PNN Alto Fragua Indi-Wasi	Amazon		Caquetá	68,000	2002	
	SFF El Corchal	Caribbean		Sucre; Bolívar	3,850	2002	
	PNN Selva de Florencia	Andean	Central Ranges	Caldas	10,019	2005	
	PNN Serranía de los Yariguíes	Andean	Eastern Ranges	Santander	78,837	2005	
	PNN Doña Juana-Cascabel Volcanic Complex	Andean	Nudo de los Pastos	Cauca; Nariño	65,858	2007	
	PNN Serranía de Los Churumbelos Auka-Wasi	Amazon		Cauca; Caquetá; Putumayo; Huila	97,189	2007	
	SFF Plantas Medicinales Orito Ingi-Ande	Amazon		Nariño; Putumayo	10,204	2008	
	PNN Yaigojé Apaporis	Amazon		Vaupés	1,060,603	2009	
	PNN Uramba Bahía Málaga	Pacific		Valle del Cauca	47,094	2010	
	SFF Playona Acandí	Caribbean		Chocó	26,232	2013	
	PNN Corales de Profundidad	Caribbean		Sucre	149,192	2013	
	PNN Bahía Portete – Kaurrele	Caribbean		La Guajira	14,080	2014	
	Serranía de Manacacías	Orinoquía		Meta	68,030.6	2023	

== Proposed areas ==
Currently there are other proposed areas for national natural parks:

- Morichales de Paz de Ariporo

The following locations could be declared fauna and flora sanctuaries:

- Bosque Seco del Patía
- Serranía de Pinche
- Serranía de San Lucas

== Disbanded areas ==
Some zones of the park system had been disbanded because of negative human impact on the environment:

- SSF Arauca
- PNN Manaure
