= Bahía Portete – Kaurrele National Natural Park =

National park in Colombia

- PNN Bahía Portete – Kaurrele
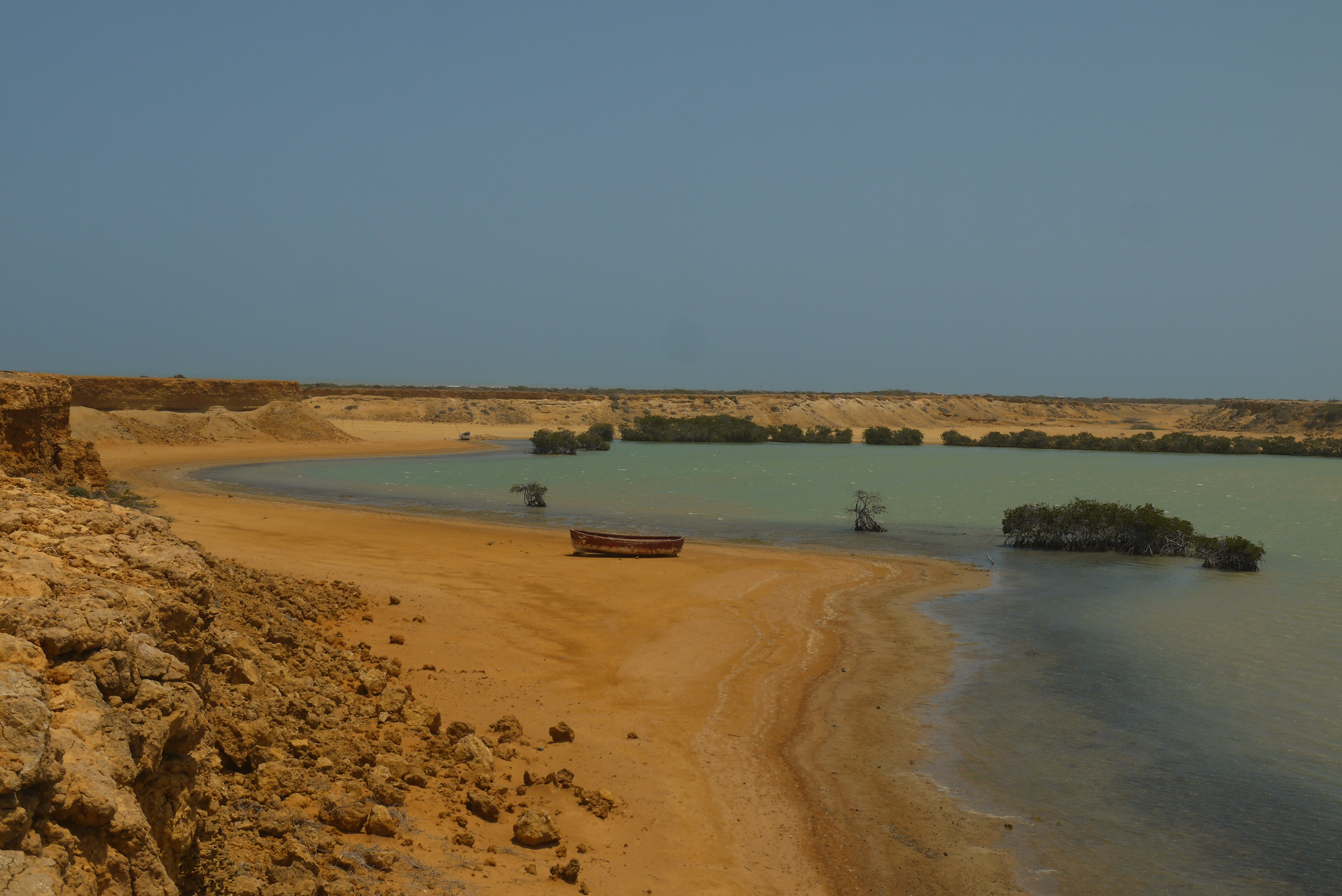
- Bahía Hondita, close to the park

- Location within Colombia
- Location: Colombia
- Nearest city: Uribia
- Coordinates: 12°07′00″N 72°02′00″W
- Area: 14,080 ha (54.4 sq mi)
- Designation: National Natural Park
- Established: 20 December 2014
- Administrator: SINAP
- Website: Official website

Bahía Portete – Kaurrele National Natural Park (Spanish: PNN Bahía Portete – Kaurrele) is a national natural park in Uribia, La Guajira, Colombia. The northernmost national park of mainland South America is located at the Caribbean coast of the La Guajira peninsula in Bahía Portete, between Cabo de la Vela and Punta Gallinas. Established on December 20, 2014, it is the most recently designated national park of the country. As of 2017, 59 nationally defined protected areas are incorporated in Colombia. The park hosts a high number of marine and terrestrial species.

== Description ==
Bahía Portete Park is located in the northern part of the municipality Uribia

Bahía Portete – Kaurrele National Natural Park, with an area of 14,080 hectares (34,800 acres), is located in the extreme north of Colombia, at the northern coast of La Guajira peninsula between Cabo de la Vela and Punta Gallinas, Colombia's mainland northernmost point. The park is within the boundaries of the municipality Uribia. The climate is hot and arid, due to the desert of La Guajira. Average temperatures range between 28 and 30 °C (82 and 86 °F). The coastal area is characterised by humidity caused by the inland winds. The marine bay area has an average depth of 9 metres (30 ft), ranging from 3 to 20 metres (9.8 to 65.6 ft).

At the Spanish conquest in the sixteenth century, the bay was known as El Portichuelo, an area where slaves were brought into Colonial Colombia. The sparsely populated area is inhabited by approximately 500 indigenous Wayuu. On April 18, 2004, approximately forty paramilitaries tortured and assassinated six people, four of which were women. They burned various houses and dishonoured their cemeteries. More than 600 Wayuu fled to Venezuela.

Bahía Portete – Kaurrele National Natural Park was designated number 59 of the National Natural Parks of Colombia to protect the marine and littoral ecosystems of the La Guajira peninsula on December 20, 2014. The declaration of the park as a protected area was initiated in 2003. The indigenous communities of the Wayuu, Kamushiwoü, Alijunao, Yariwanischi, Puerto Portete, Ian, Youlepa, Kayuuswaarraaloü and Punta Cosos Espacios contributed in the planning of the establishment of the protected area. At the declaration of the park, president of Colombia Juan Manuel Santos said "Biodiversity is to Colombia, what oil is for the Arabs". Mining and industrial fishing are prohibited.

=== Biodiversity ===
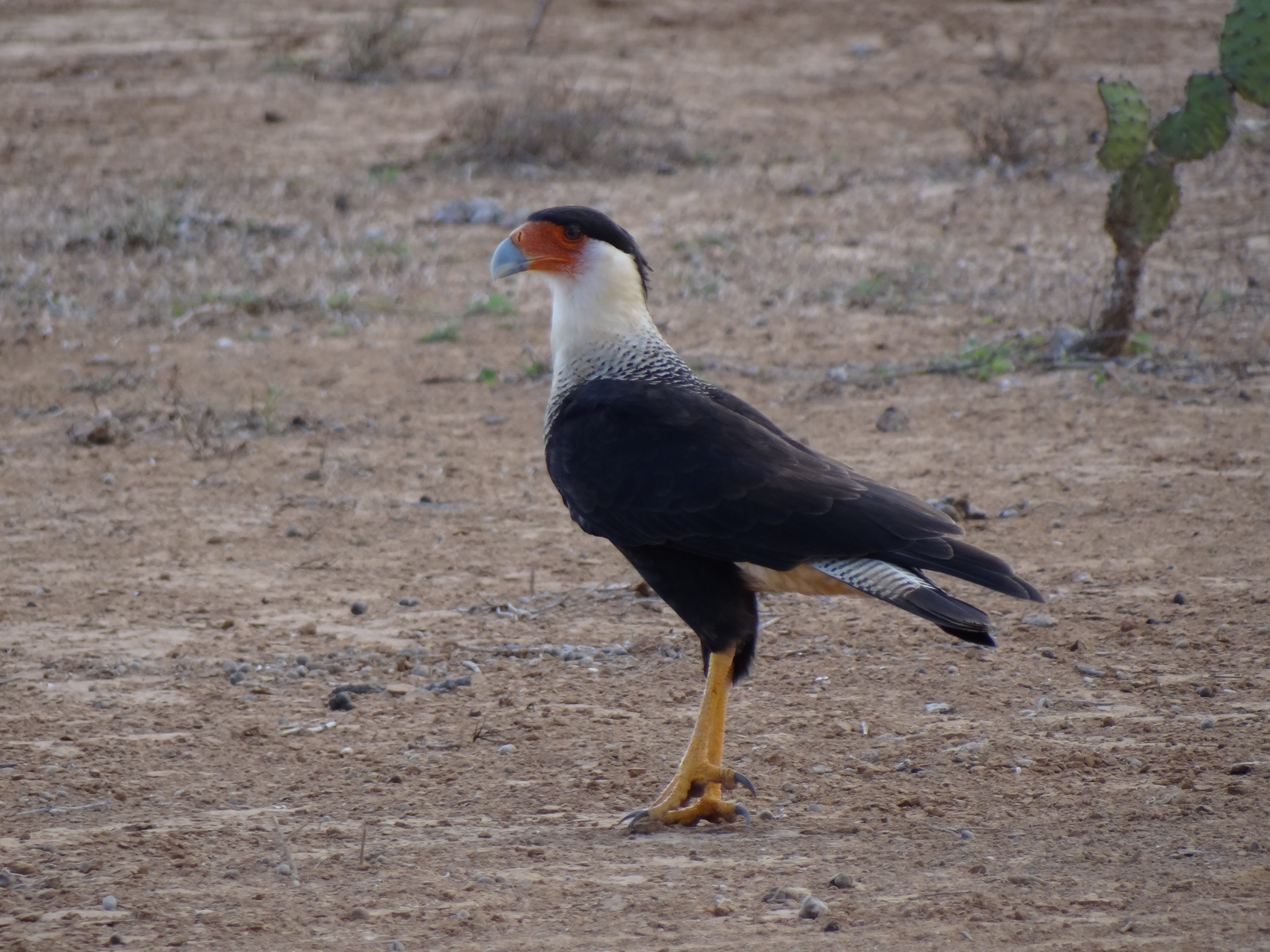
Crested caracara in La Guajira desert

Bahía Portete – Kaurrele Park comprises 25 species of reptiles and amphibians, relatively few mammals and marine fauna of 217 species have been registered in Bahía Portete. The biodiversity of the park is rich in various other species.

==== Fauna ====
Name	Species	Image
nine-banded armadillo	Dasypus novemcinctus	
southern long-nosed bat	Leptonycteris curasoae	
red-tailed squirrel	Sciurus granatensis splendidus	
crab-eating fox	Cerdocyon thous aquilus	
white-lipped peccary	Tayassu pecari	
brown hairy dwarf porcupine	Coendou vestitus	
American crocodile	Crocodylus acutus	
green iguana	Iguana iguana	
rainbow whiptail	Cnemidophorus lemniscatus	
brown vine snake	Oxybelis aeneus	
South American rattlesnake	Crotalus durissus	
green sea turtle	Chelonia mydas	
loggerhead	Caretta caretta	
hawksbill sea turtle	Eretmochelys imbricata	
leatherback sea turtle	Dermochelys coriacea	
olive ridley sea turtle	Lepidochelys olivacea	
	Mastigodryas pleei	
	Phimophis guianensis	
Rivero's toad	Bufo granulosus humboldti	
Guayaquil dwarf frog	Physalaemus pustulosos	
American flamingo	Phoenicopterus ruber	
anhinga	Anhinga anhinga	
bicolored conebill	Conirostrum bicolor	
brown pelican	Pelecanus occidentalis carolinensis	
cocoi heron	Ardea cocoi	
Crested caracara	Caracara plancus	
magnificent frigatebird	Fregata magnificens	
maguari stork	Euxenura maguari	
Neotropic cormorant	Phalacrocorax brasilianus	
roseate spoonbill	Platalea ajaja	
scarlet ibis	Eudocimus ruber	
American white ibis	Eudocimus albus	
American yellow warbler	Dendroica petechia chrysendeta	
Wilson's plover	Charadrius wilsonia	
slender seahorse	Hippocampus reidi	
common snook	Centropomus undecimalis	
hogfish	Lachnolaimus maximus	
striped mojarra	Eugerres plumieri	
cubera snapper	Lutjanus cyanopterus	
lane snapper	Lutjanus synagris	
mutton snapper	Lutjanus analis	
red porgy	Pagrus pagrus	
itajara	Epinephelus itajara	
Nassau grouper	Epinephelus striatus	
rainbow parrotfish	Scarus guacamaia	
Atlantic tarpon	Tarpon atlanticus	
Atlantic wreckfish	Polyprion americanus	
bonefish	Albula vulpes	
Tayrona blenny	Emblemariopsis tayrona	
Lebranche mullet	Mugil liza	
Cotuero toadfish	Batrachoides manglae	
crucifix sea catfish	Arius proops	
Jenny mojarra	Eucinostomus gula	
blue land crab	Cardisoma guanhumi	
Caribbean spiny lobster	Panulirus argus	
Atlantic seabob	Xiphopenaeus kroyeri	
queen conch	Strombus gigas	
mouse cowry	Muracypraea mus	
Atlantic triton	Charonia variegata	
magpie shell	Cittarium pica	
	Cassis madagascariensis	
	Haematopus palliatus	
	Penaeus notialis	
	Anachis coseli	
	Ancilla glabrata	
	Carpilus carallinus	
	Cassis flamea	
	Litopenaeus schmitti	
	Penaeus brasiliensis	
	Penaeus schmitti	
red cushion sea star	Oreaster reticulatus	
spiny flower coral	Mussa angulosa	
elkhorn coral	Acropora palmata	
staghorn coral	Acropora cervicornis	
blushing star coral	Stephanocoenia intersepta	

==== Flora ====
The coastal Bahía Portete Park is richer in flora than the surrounding desert. Common land plants are the cactus Opuntia wentiana and the mangrove tree Avicennia germinans. Meadows of sea grasses of Thalassia testudinum and Syringodium are widely distributed in the marine portion of the park.

== Other protected areas in La Guajira ==
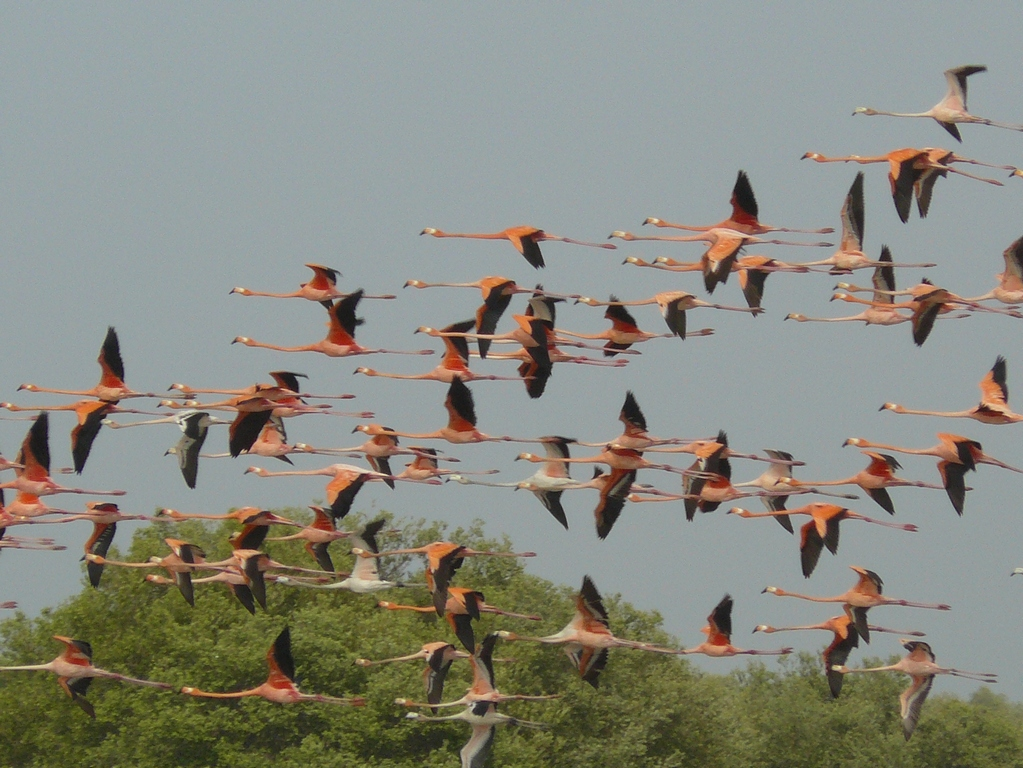
Los Flamencos Sanctuary, west of Bahía Portete in La Guajira

La Guajira contains eight protected areas, three national and five regional.

- Sierra Nevada de Santa Marta
- Los Flamencos Sanctuary
- Serranía de Macuira
- Manantial de Cañaverales
- Distrito de Manejo Integrado Musichi
- Distrito de Manejo Integrado del Perijá
- Reserva Natural de los Montes de Oca
- Distrito de Manejo Integrado Bañaderos y Alto Camarones

== Gallery ==
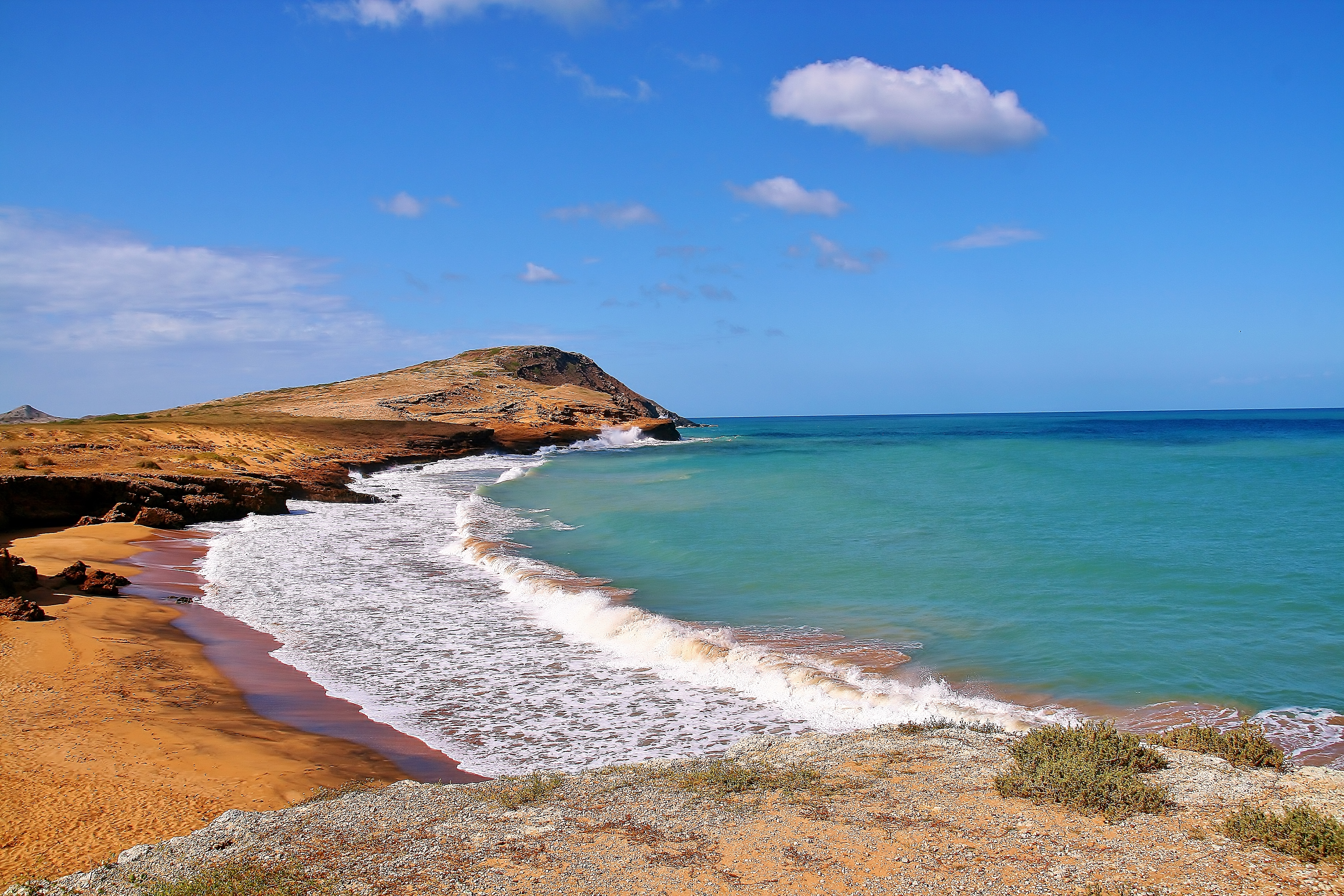
Cabo de la Vela
west of Bahía Portete

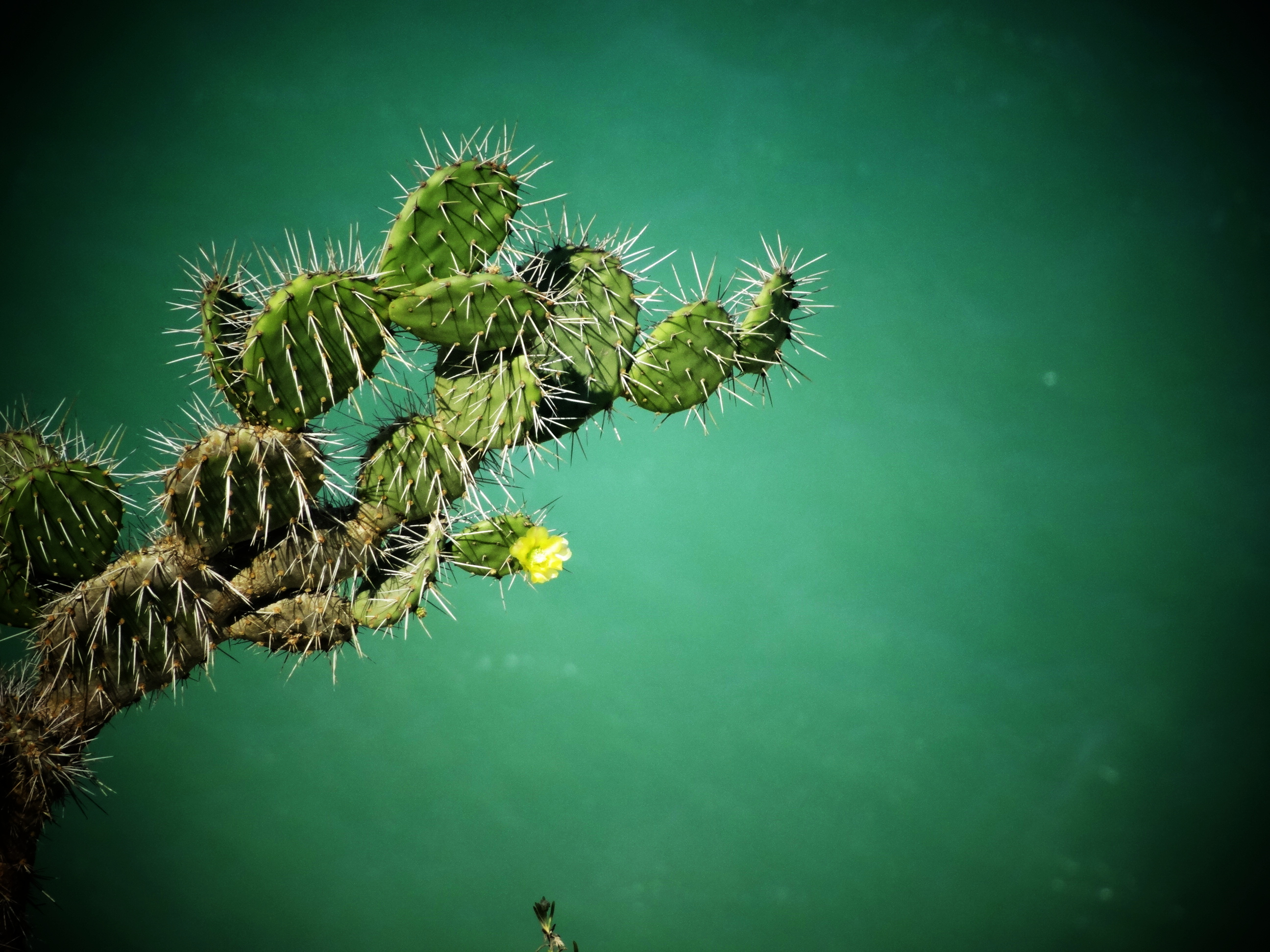
Opuntia wentiana

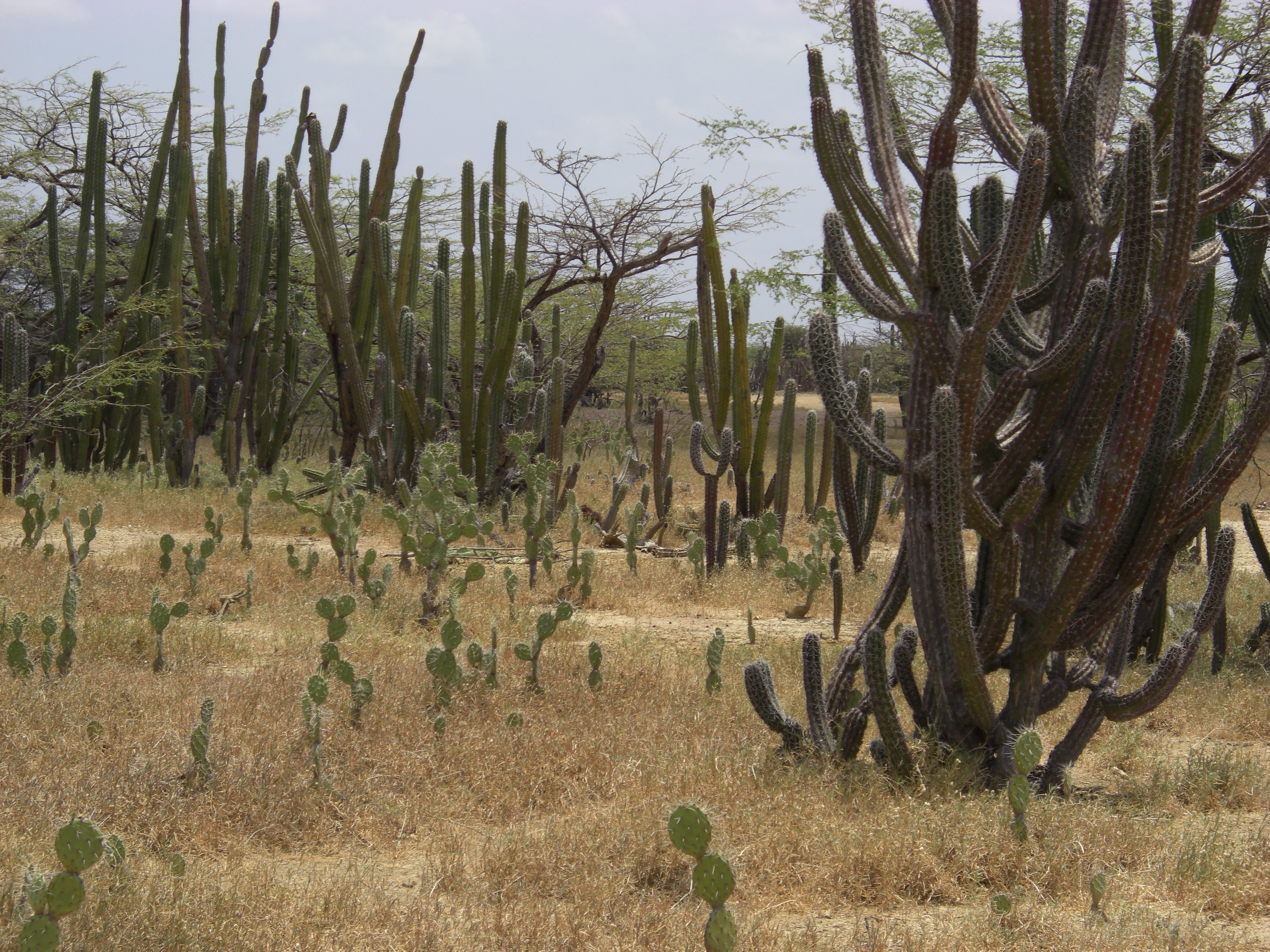
Typical cactus vegetation

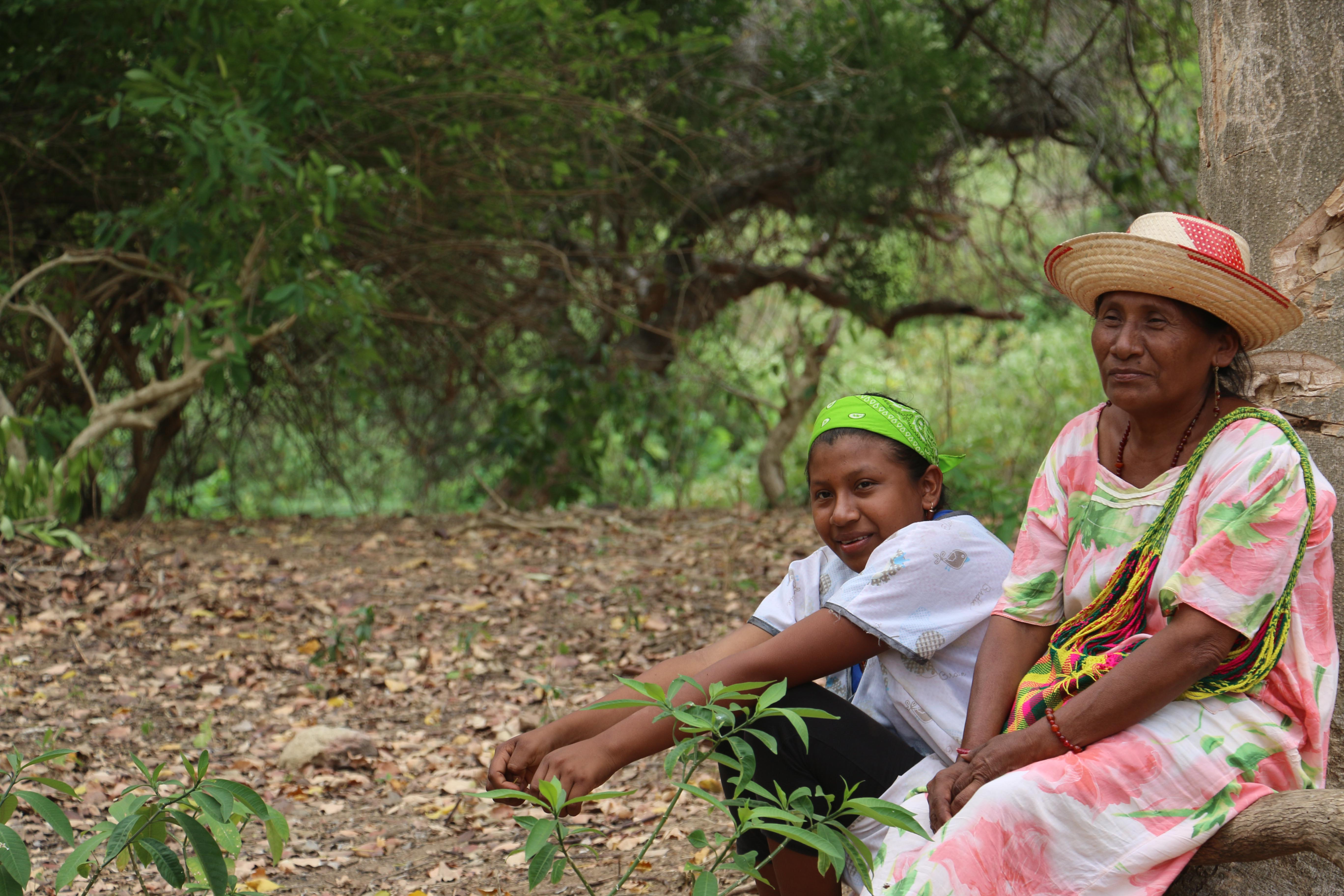
Indigenous Wayuu

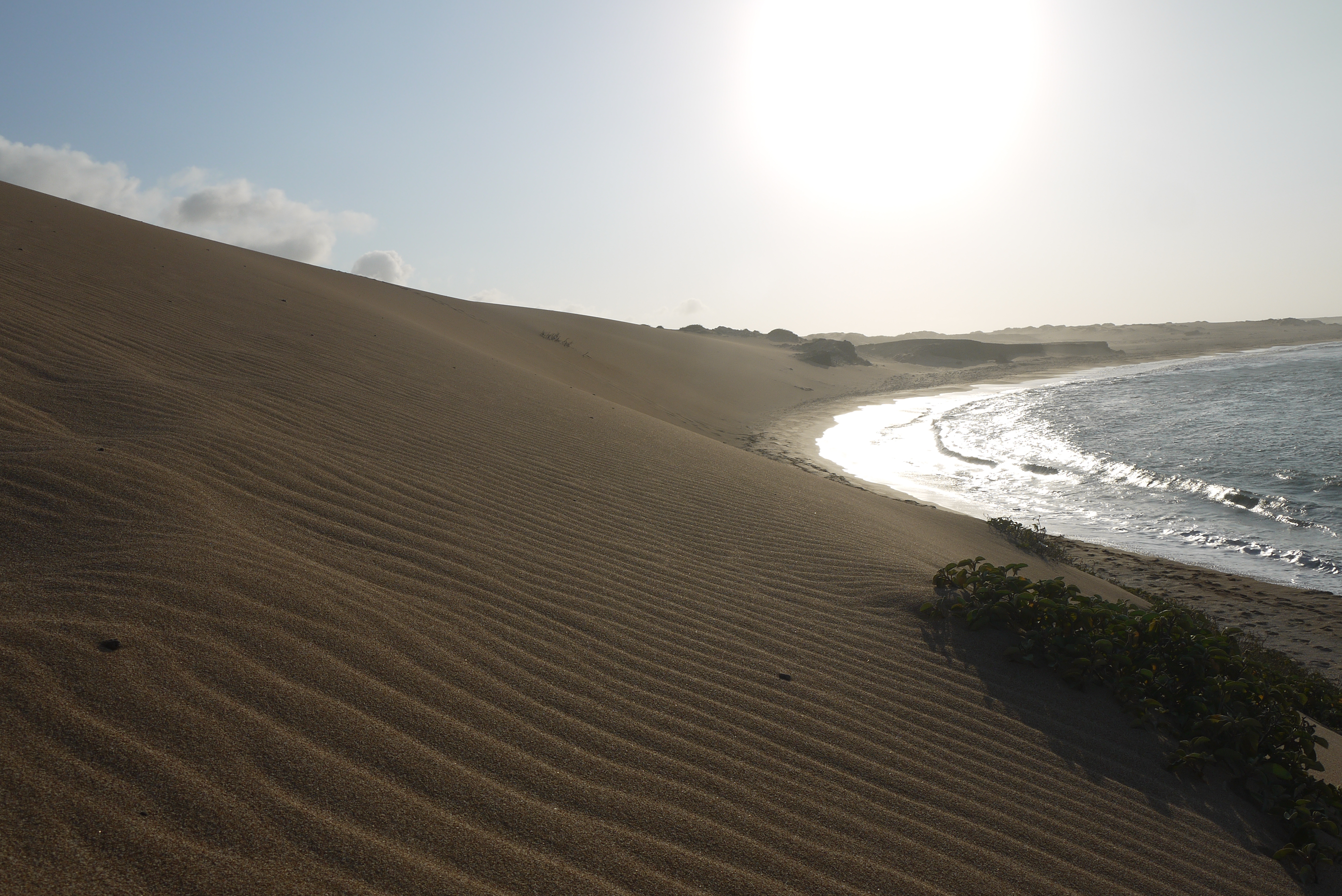
Taroa dunes
east of Bahía Portete

== See also ==
- List of national parks of Colombia
