= Invasive species in South America =

Invasive species are a serious threat to the native biodiversity of South America and are an ongoing cost to South American agriculture. South America is an important region for the world's biodiversity, and includes a wide variety of native species, many of which provide medicinal uses. Introduced species in South America, have the potential to pose harm to ecosystems of the region and the aforementioned biodiversity. Although many of these non-native species are invasive, residents of the region often value these species, making it more difficult to organize efforts to get rid of them. Because of the instrumental and cultural value placed on these species, greater awareness, research, and policy are all necessary steps in solving invasive issues in South America. Here is a list of just a few of the species that have invaded South America and where they originate.

== Mammals ==
- Beaver from North America to Tierra del Fuego

In 1946, the Argentine Navy imported ten beaver couples from Canada and set them free in Isla Grande, the consequences of this initiative were disastrous. These beavers were protected from hunting for 35 years, and free from natural predators. The beavers grew in population drastically. This caused irreversible changes in the forest ecosystem and started advancing over the continent. Now, a study published in Chilean Natural History suggests that the demographic explosion of those beavers could be bigger than suspected because it can take years or even decades for local inhabitants to notice the rodents' presence and their impact on the surrounding ecosystems.

- European hare from Europe to Peru, Bolivia, Paraguay, Argentina, Chile, Uruguay and Brazil

The European hare has a wide range across Europe and western Asia and has been introduced to a number of other countries around the globe, often as a game species. In general, it is considered moderately abundant in its native range. They have been associated with the intensification of agricultural practices. The hare is an adaptable species and can move into new habitats, but it survives best when there is an availability of a wide variety of weeds and other herbs to supplement its main diet of grasses. The hare is considered a pest in some areas; it is more likely to damage crops and young trees in winter when there are not enough alternative foodstuffs available.

- European rabbit in Argentina
- Pallas's squirrel in Argentina
- Chital from Asia to Argentina, Brazil, Uruguay and Chile

Chital's breeding takes place throughout the year, with peaks that vary geographically. Sperms are produced year-round, though testosterone levels register a fall during the development of the antlers. Females have regular estrous cycles, each lasting three weeks. The female can conceive again two weeks to four months after birth. Due to the quick pace that they can reproduce, the population is growing so rapidly it causes serious damage to agriculture and natural areas.

- Red deer from Europe

Red deer can damage native and cultivated vegetation and pose a hazard to vehicles and humans. They are listed as one of the world's 100 worst invasive alien species by the International Union for Conservation of Nature. Crops that are affected are pasture, forestry, gardens. They damage the natural environment by eating native vegetation, damaging trees, spreading weed seeds and fouling water. The red deer also cause damage to forestry seedlings, agricultural and horticultural crops, commercial flower crops, orchards, irrigation systems, and fences. In dry seasons, they compete with cattle for pasture and supplementary feed. They can be a traffic hazard on suburban roads and highways. Aggressive rutting stags can also pose risk to humans.

- Wild boar from Europe

Invasive wild pigs’ success can largely be attributed to their lack of natural predators, impressive fertility, adaptability to a variety of climates and conditions, and tendency to eat almost anything. Humans have also helped these invaders spread. By releasing them from farms and hunting preserves, as well as illegal translocation of pigs to create recreational hunting opportunities, has contributed to invasive wild pigs’ recent range expansion. These wild boars cause damage to native plants and crops and compete with native species.

- Hippopotamus from Africa to Colombia, originally kept by Pablo Escobar

The hippopotamus is an invasive species and very resistant to everything. With no predators and ample food, the rivers prove to be an ideal habitat for the hippos. They carry diseases that can kill livestock. They pollute the water courses where they defecate. The hippopotamuses are causing damage to the ecosystem and not only affecting the environment but the animals who also live off this land as well.

== Fish ==
No fish are accounted to be invasive in South America.

- Brook trout in Argentina
- Rainbow Trout
- Chinook Salmon
- Brown Trout
- Coho Salmon

== Invertebrates ==
Giant-African-land-snail was introduced in Brazil in the 1980s as an alternative to escargot's farming, as the species grows faster and is more prolific. Mainly due to the rejection of the snail's meat by the Brazilian population, the investors ultimately released the animals in the wild. In 1993, imports of invertebrates, as well as many other animal groups, were forbidden in Brazil. In 2005, the species was officially declared an invasive species.

== Targeting the issue ==
Invasive species are a worldwide epidemic threatening ecosystems and costing billions of dollars to control. The reason these invasive species thrive in these locations is due to no predators to hunt them. With no predators, they are able to grow in population quickly but they are taking up too many of the resources in the location they settle in. Invasive species oftentimes destroy the environment which harms the other plants and animals who also share this environment. These various species can also hurt the economy in the long run as we see with the Water hyacinth plant.

The government and officials are taking various tactics to try to put an end to and also try to get rid of this issue of invasive species. Sometimes other species are introduced to help get rid of an invasive species. For example, the government in Australia brought in cactus moth caterpillars to eat the cactuses. These caterpillars are natural predators of the cactus. The issue with this introducing insects to solve these problems can cause this insect to ruin other plants then making them invasive. Chemicals is another way officials have tried to control invasive species, but they can sometimes these chemicals can harm noninvasive plants and animals.

== See also ==
- Invasive species in Colombia
