= Las Orquídeas National Natural Park =

National park in Colombia

Las Orquideas National Natural Park
- PNN Las Orquideas
- IUCN category II (national park)
- Interactive map of Las Orquideas National Natural Park
- Coordinates: 6°33′N 76°15′W
- Area: 287.53 km^{2} (111.02 sq mi)
- Designation: National Natural Park
- Established: 1974
- Administrator: SINAP

Las Orquídeas National Natural Park (Spanish: Parque Nacional Natural Las Orquídeas or PNN Las Orquídeas) is a national park in the Cordillera Occidental, Colombia. Established in 1974, the park encompasses 287.53 km^{2} (111.02 mi^{2}) on the western slopes of Colombia's Cordillera Occidental.

The park covers a large elevational range (300–3,450 m). The climate is generally humid with an annual rainfall of 3,000-4,000 mm, dropping to 2,500 mm at highest elevations, and ranges from tropical lowland to alpine. The range in elevation and climate creates a diversity of plant communities, including lowland rainforest (ca. 300–1,000 m), premontane forest (ca. 1,000–2,000 m), montane forest (ca. 2,000–3,200 m), and high-elevation páramo grassland (ca. 3,200–3,450 m).
