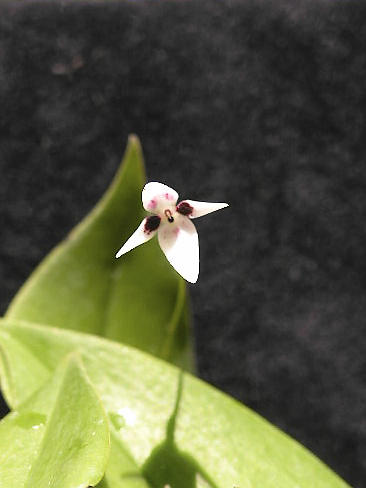

Scientific classification
- Kingdom: Plantae
- Clade: Tracheophytes
- Clade: Angiosperms
- Clade: Monocots
- Order: Asparagales
- Family: Orchidaceae
- Subfamily: Epidendroideae
- Genus: Pleurothallis
- Species: P. anthrax

Binomial name
- Pleurothallis anthrax Luer & R.Escobar

= Pleurothallis anthrax =

Species of orchid

Pleurothallis anthrax is a species of orchid native to southern Colombia and Venezuela.
