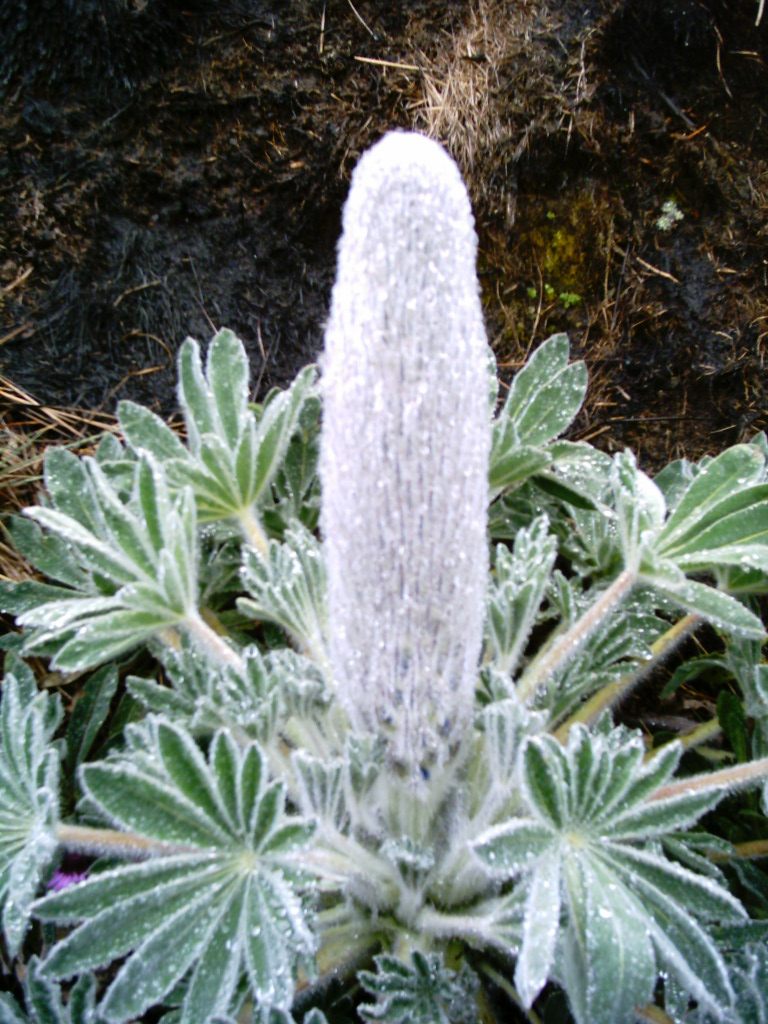

Scientific classification
- Kingdom: Plantae
- Clade: Tracheophytes
- Clade: Angiosperms
- Clade: Eudicots
- Clade: Rosids
- Order: Fabales
- Family: Fabaceae
- Subfamily: Faboideae
- Genus: Lupinus
- Species: L. alopecuroides

Binomial name
- Lupinus alopecuroides Desr.

= Lupinus alopecuroides =

Species of plant

Lupinus alopecuroides is a species of lupine native to the mountain peaks of Colombia and Ecuador.

Lupinus alopecuroides has been used as animal feed. The species lives between the altitudes of 2700-4500 meters.

The species only lives in 10 isolated mountains, 3 of which are in Colombia and 7 of which are in Ecuador. There is low genetic variation between plants in the same population, but high diversity between the 10 populations.
