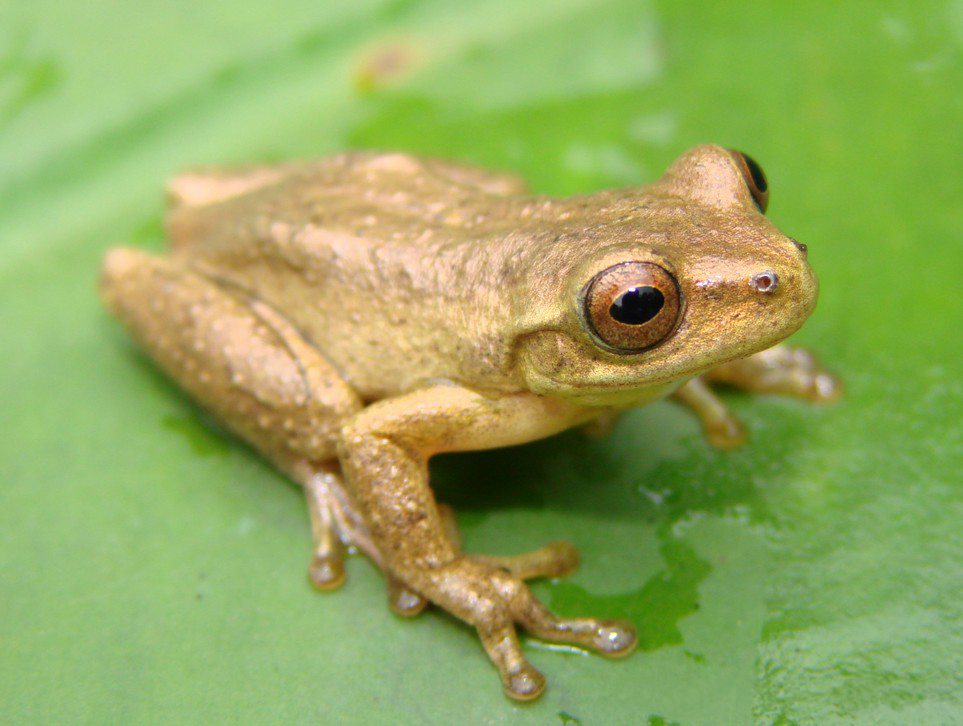

Conservation status
- Least Concern (IUCN 3.1)

Scientific classification
- Kingdom: Animalia
- Phylum: Chordata
- Class: Amphibia
- Order: Anura
- Family: Hylidae
- Genus: Dendropsophus
- Species: D. columbianus

Binomial name
- Dendropsophus columbianus (Boettger, 1892)

Synonyms
- Hyla variabilis Boulenger, 1896

= Dendropsophus columbianus =

Species of frog

Dendropsophus columbianus (common name: Boettger's Colombian treefrog) is a species of frog in the family Hylidae. It is endemic to the Andes of Colombia. Dendropsophus columbianus is a common and adaptable species that lives in disturbed areas that formerly supported cloud forests; it has not been found in closed forests. It is typically associated with open habitats, especially those with some waterbodies (small lakes, reservoirs, grassy marshes or pools, wetlands).
