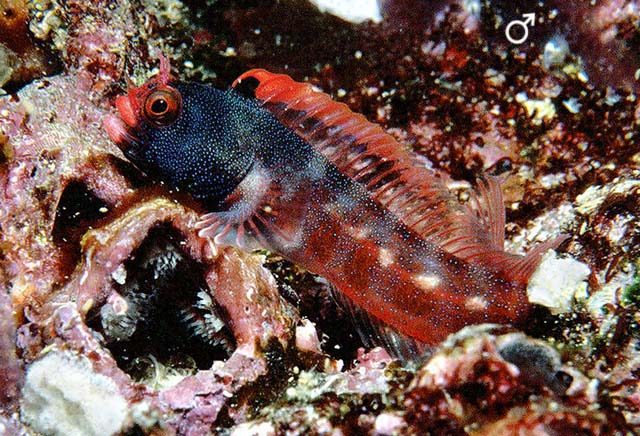

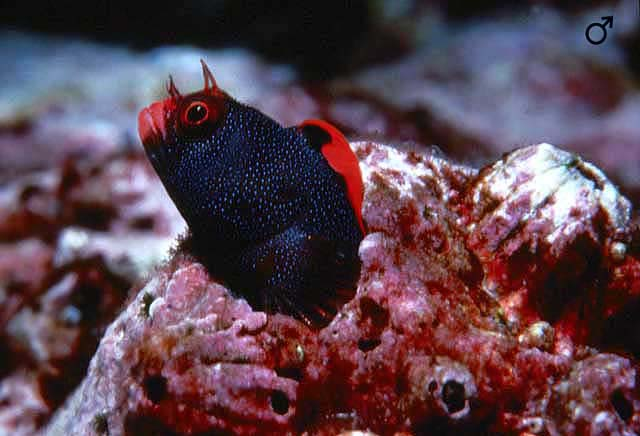

Conservation status
- Vulnerable (IUCN 3.1)

Scientific classification
- Kingdom: Animalia
- Phylum: Chordata
- Class: Actinopterygii
- Order: Blenniiformes
- Family: Chaenopsidae
- Genus: Acanthemblemaria
- Species: A. stephensi

Binomial name
- Acanthemblemaria stephensi Rosenblatt & McCosker, 1988
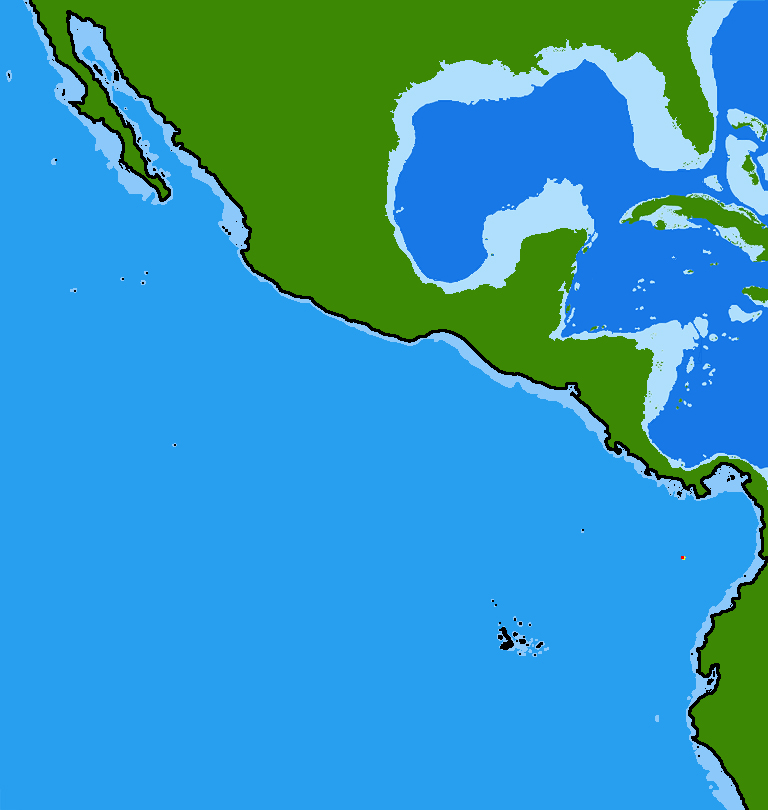

= Acanthemblemaria stephensi =

Species of fish

Acanthemblemaria stephensi, the Malpelo barnacle blenny, is a species of chaenopsid blenny found in coral reefs around Malpelo Island, in the eastern Pacific ocean. It can reach a maximum total length of 5 cm (2.0 in). This species feeds primarily on zooplankton. The specific name honours the environmental biologist John S. Stephens Jr.
