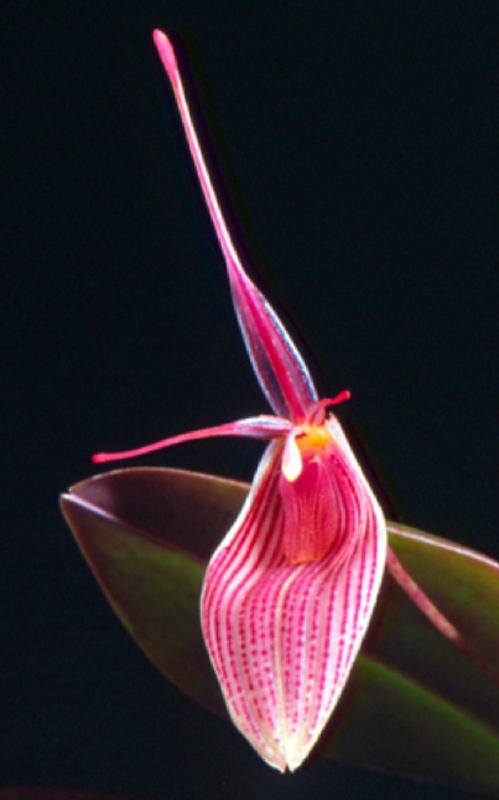
- Flower of Restrepia chameleon

Scientific classification
- Kingdom: Plantae
- Clade: Tracheophytes
- Clade: Angiosperms
- Clade: Monocots
- Order: Asparagales
- Family: Orchidaceae
- Subfamily: Epidendroideae
- Genus: Restrepia
- Species: R. chameleon

Binomial name
- Restrepia chameleon Luer & R.Escobar

= Restrepia chameleon =

Species of orchid

Restrepia chameleon, the color-changing restrepia, is a species of orchid endemic to Colombia.
