= Bosque Seco del Patía Fauna and Flora Sanctuary =

Wildlife sanctuary in Colombia

Bosque Seco del Patía Fauna and Flora Sanctuary, or Patia Dry Forest, is a wildlife sanctuary in Colombia. It is located on the border between the Nariño Department and the Cauca Department.
