= Las Hermosas National Natural Park =

Colombian protected area

Parque Nacional Natural Las Hermosas
- Las Hermosas National Natural Park
- IUCN category II (national park)
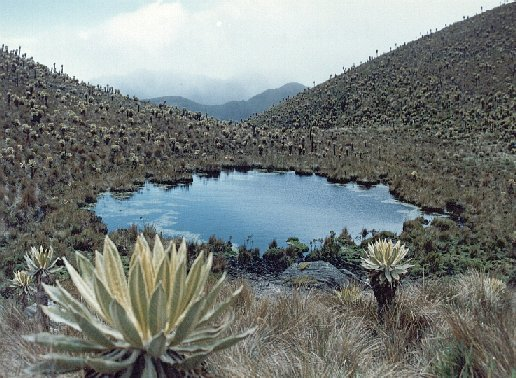
- Laguna Las Mellizas, Las Hermosas National Natural Park

- Location within Colombia
- Nearest city: Santiago de Cali, Colombia
- Coordinates: 3°32′N 75°57′W
- Area: 1,250 km^{2} (480 sq mi)
- Established: May 1977
- Governing body: SINAP

The Las Hermosas National Natural Park (Spanish: Parque Nacional Natural Las Hermosas) is a national park located in the Valle del Cauca and Tolima departments, at the highest elevation of Cordillera Central range in the Andean Region of Colombia. Its main feature is probably the wetlands and 387 glacial lakes.

== General ==
The park is bounded by the Magdalena River and Cauca River. Its elevation ranges from 1,600 m (5,200 ft) to 4,400 m (14,400 ft) above mean sea level. The area has a canyon, formed by the surrounding rivers, but it is hard to access. It is of historical importance as it was one of the most defended areas by the indigenous Pijao peoples against the Spanish Conquistadors.

Three types of geological formations are found in the area: intrusive igneous rocks, metamorphic rock and formations from more recent volcanic eruptions.

== Climate ==
Average yearly rainfall is 2000 mm at the lower elevations and 1500 mm above 3,000 m (9,800 ft). Average temperature is 24 °C at the lower elevations, and 4 °C at the highest. December–March and July–August are dry periods.

== Flora and fauna ==
Noteworthy plants include: wax palm trees, Podocarpus oleifolius, Aniba perutilis, Ocotea heterochroma, Chuquiraga jussieui, Passiflora tenerifensis and Andean Walnut.

The most diverse group of fauna are the birds, followed by the mammals and reptiles. Recorded mammals include: spectacled bear, mountain tapir, cougar, oncilla, pudú, white-tailed deer. Fish in the glacial lakes feed on green algae, blue-green algae and unicellular algae found throughout the 387 lakes.
