= Los Flamencos Sanctuary =

Protected area in Colombia's Caribbean Region

SFF Los Flamencos
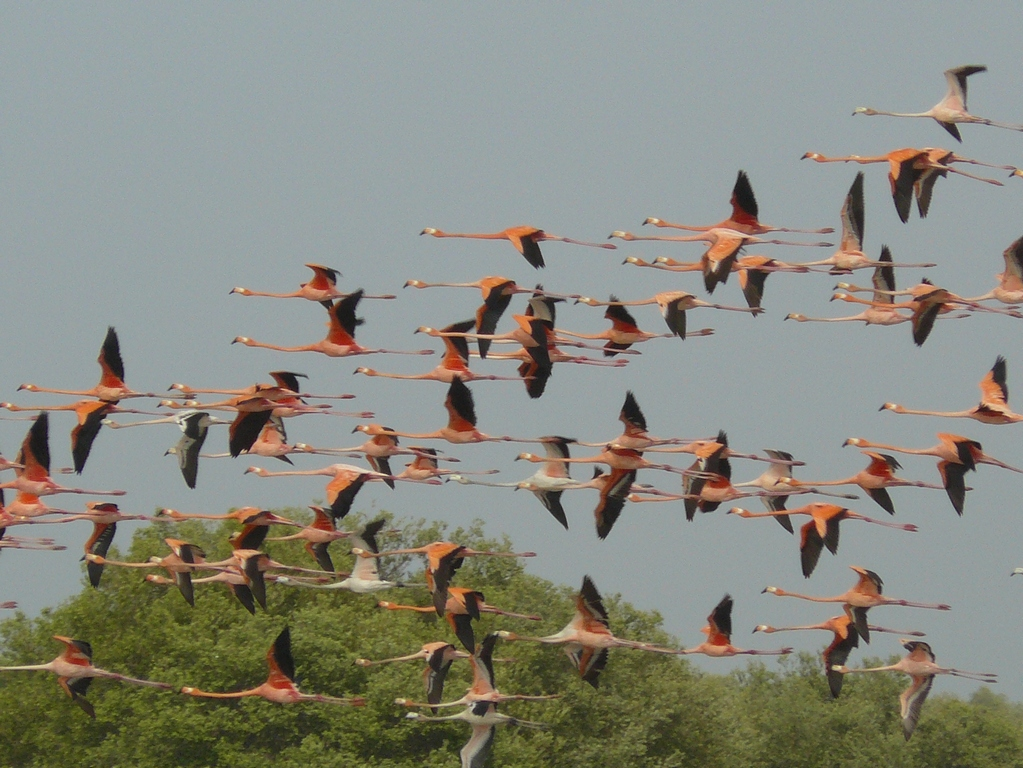

- Location within Colombia
- Location: Guajira Peninsula, Colombia
- Coordinates: 11°24′N 73°07′W
- Area: 7.682 ha (76,820 m^{2})
- Established: 1977
- Governing body: SINAP

Los Flamencos Sanctuary (Spanish: Santuario de Fauna y Flora Los Flamencos) has been a designated wildlife sanctuary since 1977. It is located in the Guajira Peninsula of Colombia's Caribbean Region. Its main attraction is the American flamingoes, and their nests that can reach 60 cm (2.0 ft) high.

The sanctuary is located between the fishing village of Camarones and the Tapias River, surrounded by estuaries and marshes including Manzanillo, Laguna Grande, Ciénaga del Navío Quebrado and Tocoromanes marshes.

Many other shore and water birds can be found in the sanctuary such as roseate spoonbills, great egrets, laughing gulls and many others. The surrounding xerophytic scrub habitat is also home to many endemic birds such as buffy hummingbirds, white-whiskered spinetails, Tocuyo sparrows, and vermilion cardinals.

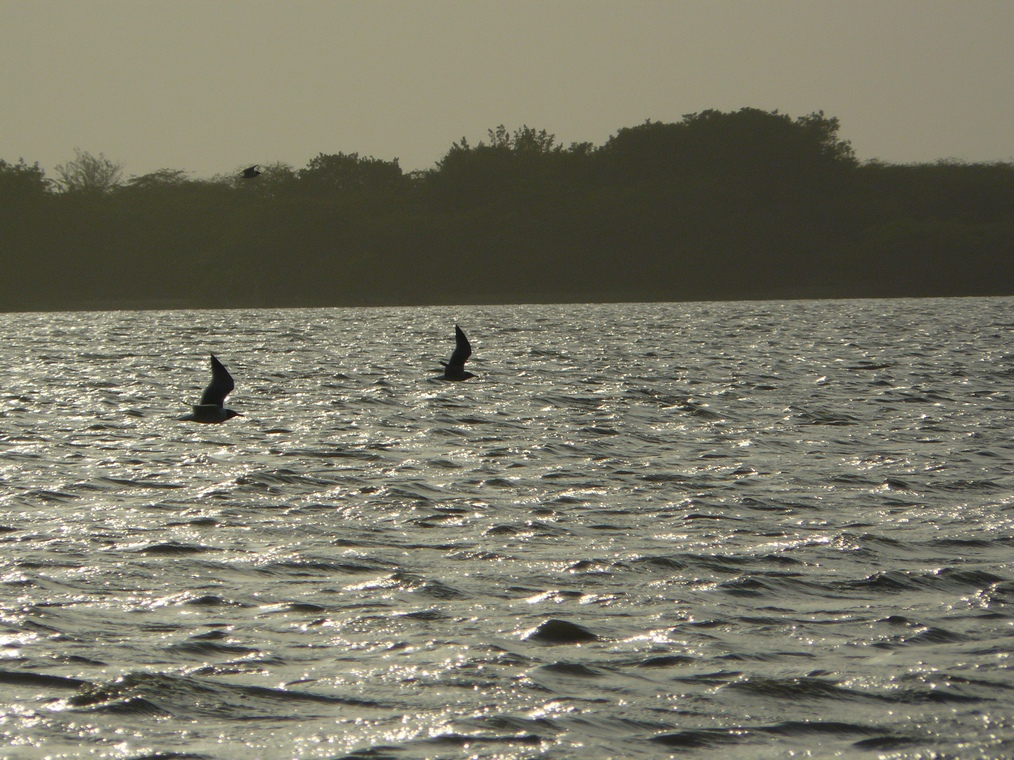
Laughing gull at sunset

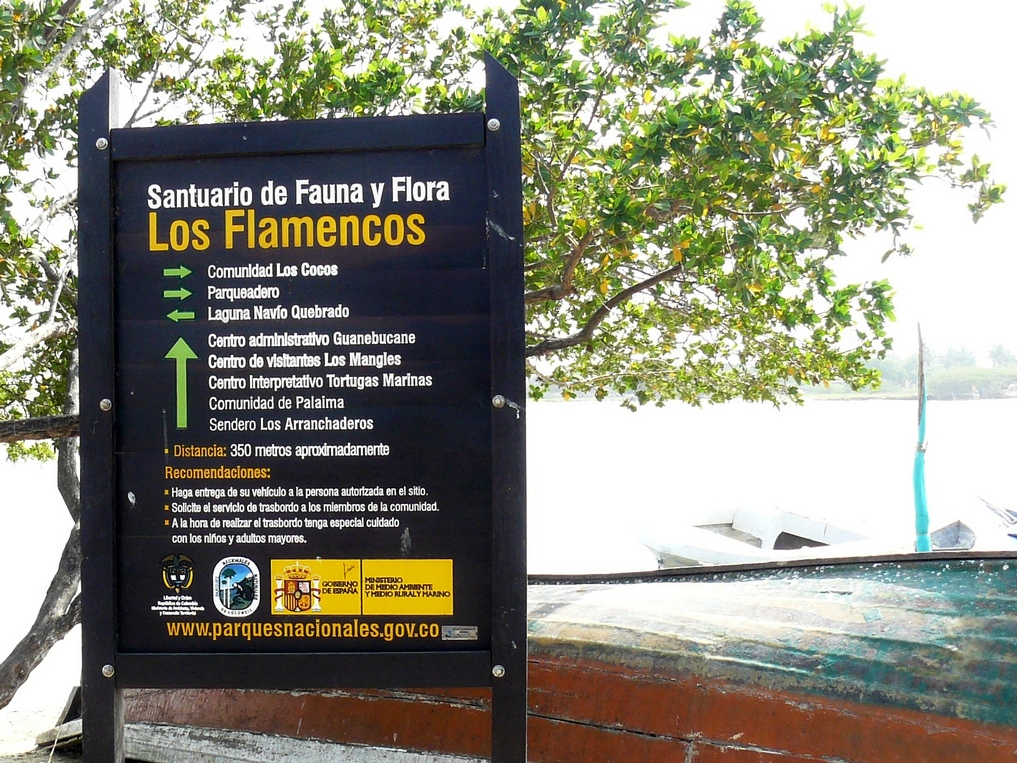
Entrance sign

== See also ==
- List of national parks of Colombia
- Caribbean Natural Region, Colombia
