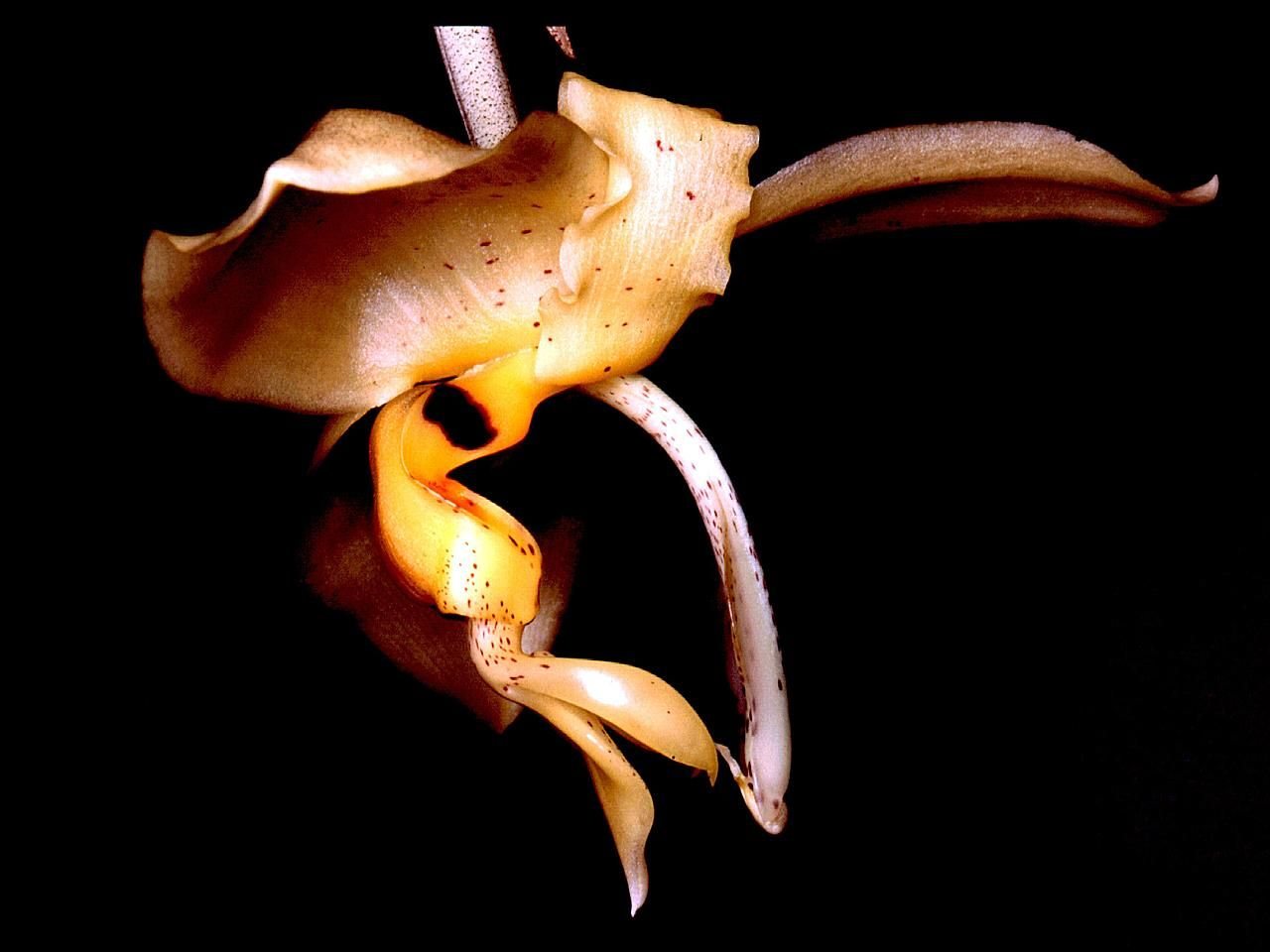
- Stanhopea pozoi flower

Scientific classification
- Kingdom: Plantae
- Clade: Tracheophytes
- Clade: Angiosperms
- Clade: Monocots
- Order: Asparagales
- Family: Orchidaceae
- Subfamily: Epidendroideae
- Genus: Stanhopea
- Species: S. pozoi

Binomial name
- Stanhopea pozoi Dodson & D.E.Benn.

= Stanhopea pozoi =

Species of orchid

Stanhopea pozoi is a species of orchid native to south Ecuador.
