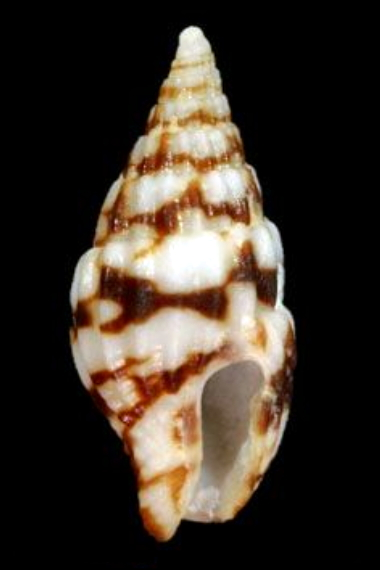
- Shell of Anachis coseli (specimen at the Natural History Museum Rotterdam)

Scientific classification
- Kingdom: Animalia
- Phylum: Mollusca
- Class: Gastropoda
- Subclass: Caenogastropoda
- Order: Neogastropoda
- Family: Columbellidae
- Genus: Anachis
- Species: A. coseli

Binomial name
- Anachis coseli Diaz & Mittnacht, 1991

= Anachis coseli =

Species of gastropod

Anachis coseli is a species of sea snail in the family Columbellidae, the dove snails.

== Description ==
The length of the shell is up to 15 mm.

== Distribution ==
This species is found in the Caribbean Sea, particularly off the coasts of Colombia and Jamaica, and in the Atlantic Ocean off the coast of Brazil.
