= Halichoeres malpelo =

Conservation status
- Vulnerable (IUCN 3.1)

Scientific classification
- Kingdom: Animalia
- Phylum: Chordata
- Class: Actinopterygii
- Order: Labriformes
- Family: Labridae
- Genus: Halichoeres
- Species: H. malpelo

Binomial name
- Halichoeres malpelo G. R. Allen & D. R. Robertson, 1992

Species of fish

Halichoeres malpelo, or the Malpelo wrasse, is a species of saltwater wrasse found in the eastern-central Pacific Ocean.

== Description ==
This species reaches a length of 6.5 cm (2.6 in).
