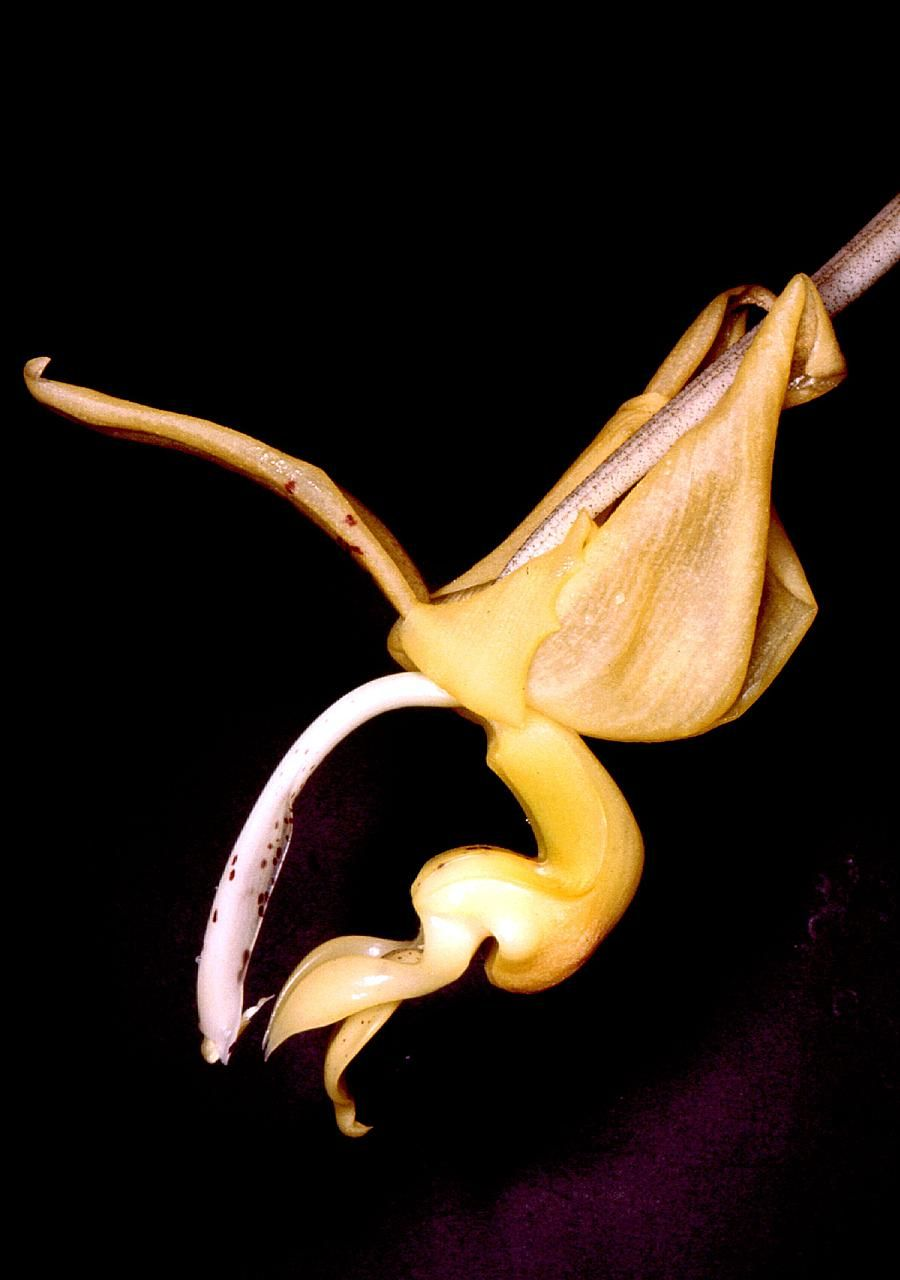
- Stanhopea stevensonii flower

Scientific classification
- Kingdom: Plantae
- Clade: Tracheophytes
- Clade: Angiosperms
- Clade: Monocots
- Order: Asparagales
- Family: Orchidaceae
- Subfamily: Epidendroideae
- Genus: Stanhopea
- Species: S. stevensonii

Binomial name
- Stanhopea stevensonii M.M.Mejia & R.Escobar ex Jenny

= Stanhopea stevensonii =

Species of orchid

Stanhopea stevensonii is a species of orchid endemic to Colombia (Meta).
