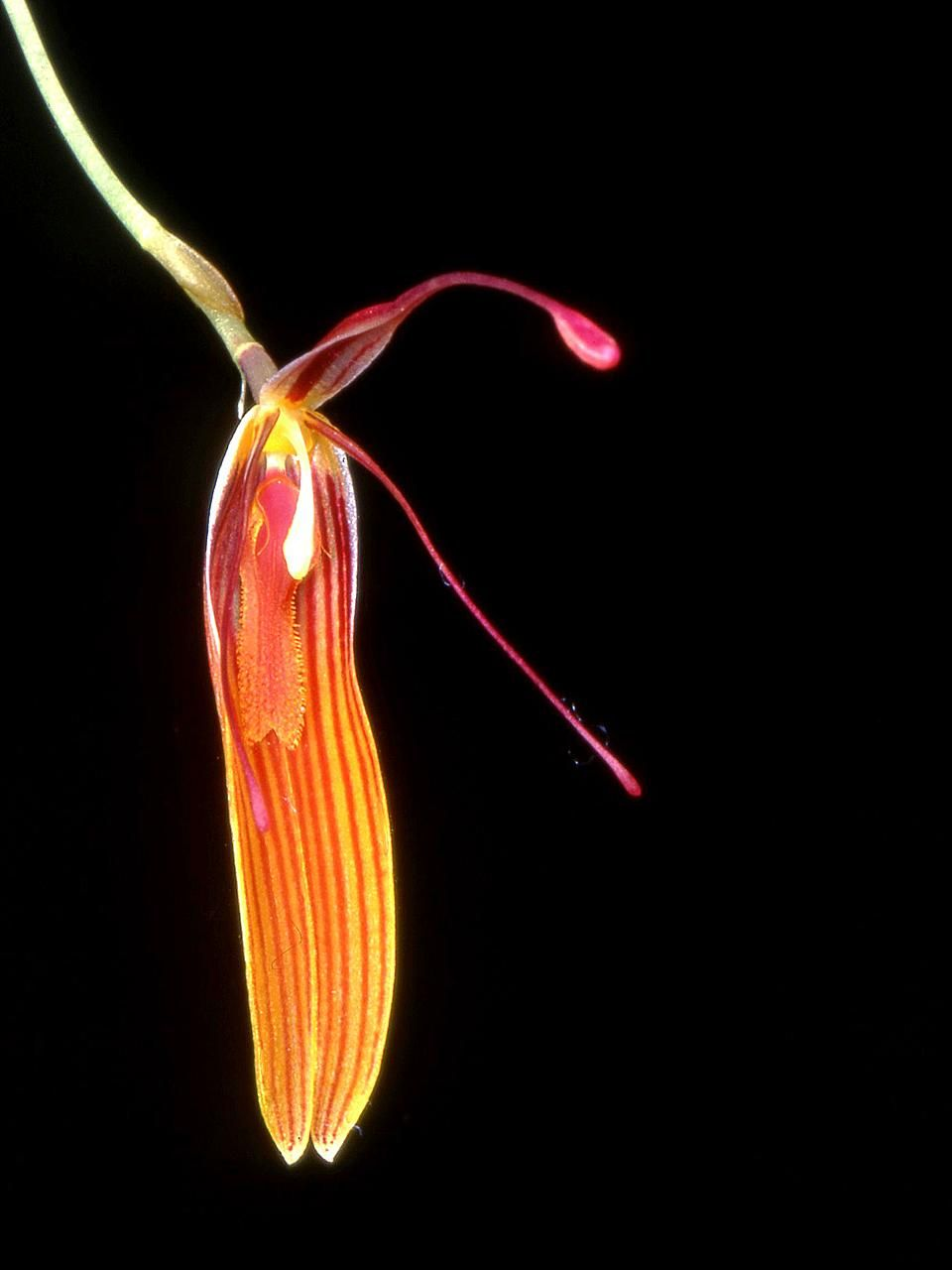

Scientific classification
- Kingdom: Plantae
- Clade: Tracheophytes
- Clade: Angiosperms
- Clade: Monocots
- Order: Asparagales
- Family: Orchidaceae
- Subfamily: Epidendroideae
- Genus: Restrepia
- Species: R. nittiorhyncha

Binomial name
- Restrepia nittiorhyncha (Lindl.) Garay

Synonyms
- Pleurothallis nittiorhyncha Lindl. (basionym); Humboldtia nittiorhyncha (Lindl.) Kuntze; Restrepia schlimii Rchb.f.

= Restrepia nittiorhyncha =

Species of orchid

Restrepia nittiorhyncha is a species of orchid endemic to Colombia.

It is an epiphyte that grows in the wet tropical regions of Colombia.
