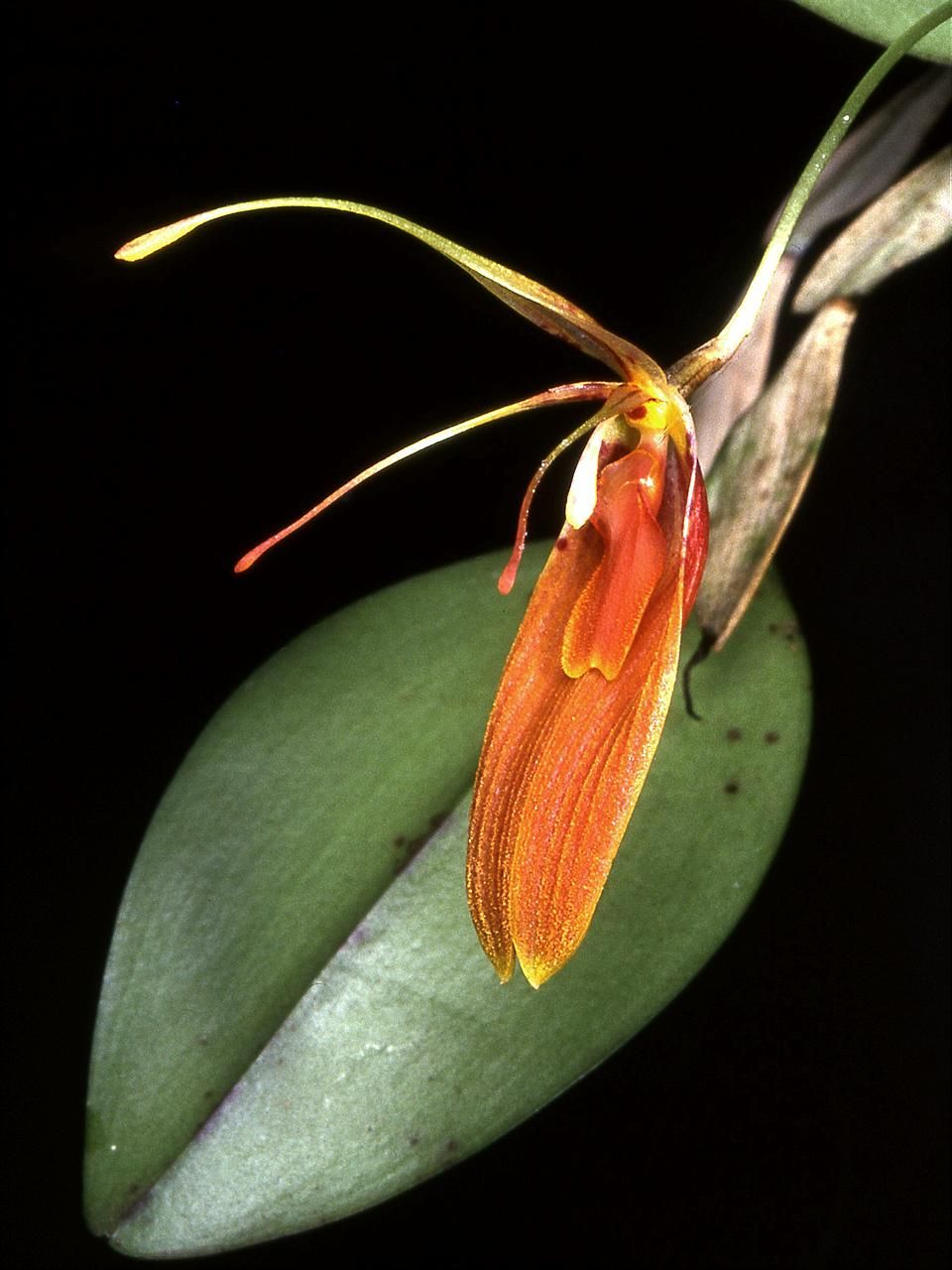
- Flower of Restrepia cuprea

Scientific classification
- Kingdom: Plantae
- Clade: Tracheophytes
- Clade: Angiosperms
- Clade: Monocots
- Order: Asparagales
- Family: Orchidaceae
- Subfamily: Epidendroideae
- Genus: Restrepia
- Species: R. cuprea

Binomial name
- Restrepia cuprea Luer & R.Escobar

= Restrepia cuprea =

Species of orchid

Restrepia cuprea, the copper-colored restrepia, is a species of orchid endemic to Colombia.
