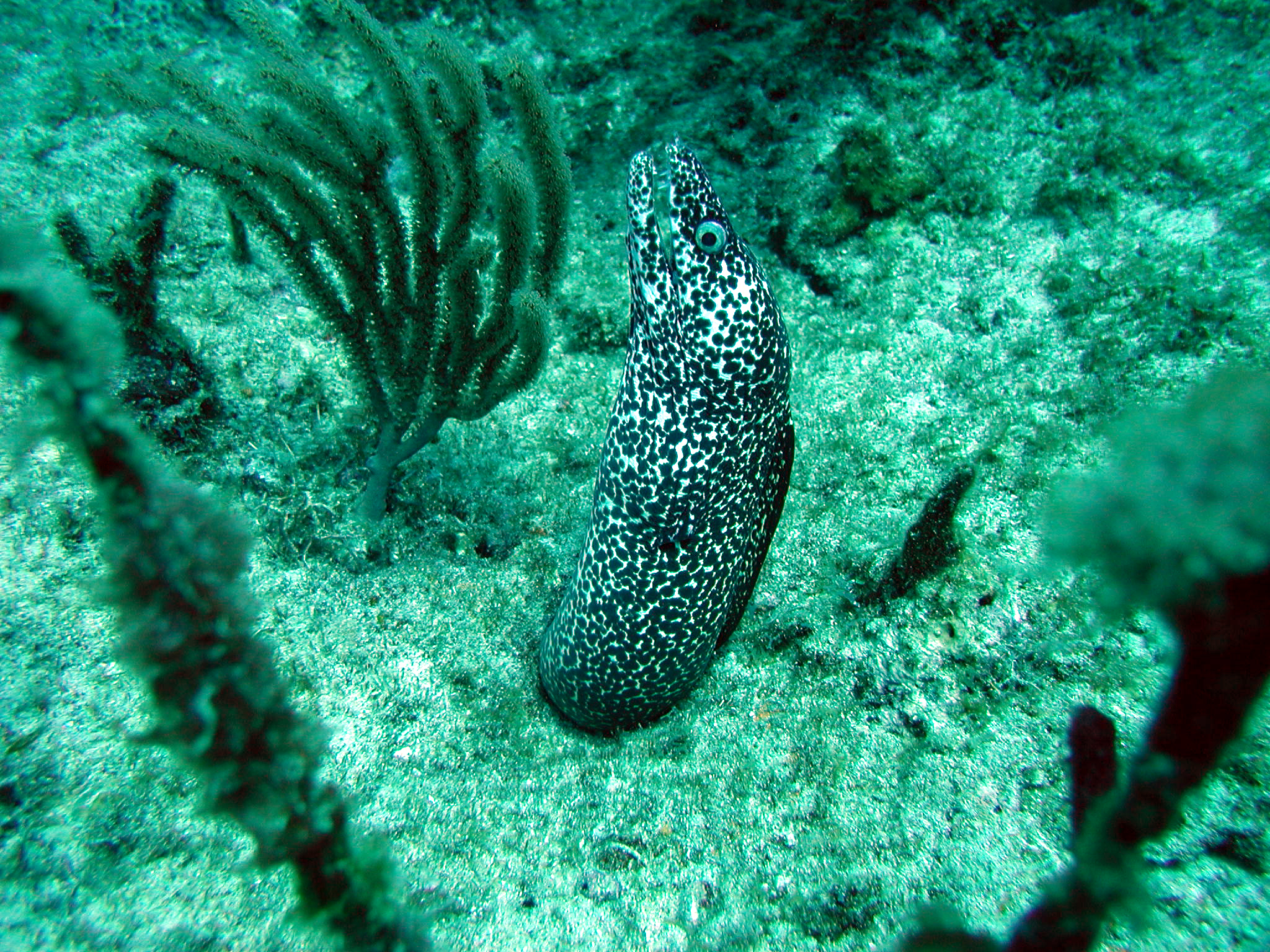

Conservation status
- Least Concern (IUCN 3.1)

Scientific classification
- Kingdom: Animalia
- Phylum: Chordata
- Class: Actinopterygii
- Order: Anguilliformes
- Family: Muraenidae
- Genus: Gymnothorax
- Species: G. moringa

Binomial name
- Gymnothorax moringa Cuvier, 1829

= Spotted moray =

Species of moringa

The spotted moray (Gymnothorax moringa) is a medium to large moray eel. Other common names include conger, spotted eel, red moray, speckled moray, white cong, white jawed moray, white-chinned moray and white-jawed moray eel. Spotted eels have a long snake-like body, white or pale yellow in general with small overlapping reddish brown to dark-brown spots. They are commonly 60 cm (24 in) in length and can grow up to 2 m (6.6 ft), weighing 2.51 kg (5.5 lb). They inhabit the Western Atlantic Ocean from North Carolina and Bermuda to Brazil, including the Gulf of Mexico and the Caribbean. They are also found around the Mid- and Eastern Atlantic islands as far south as St Helena. They are typically found anywhere from the surface to a depth of 200 m (660 ft).

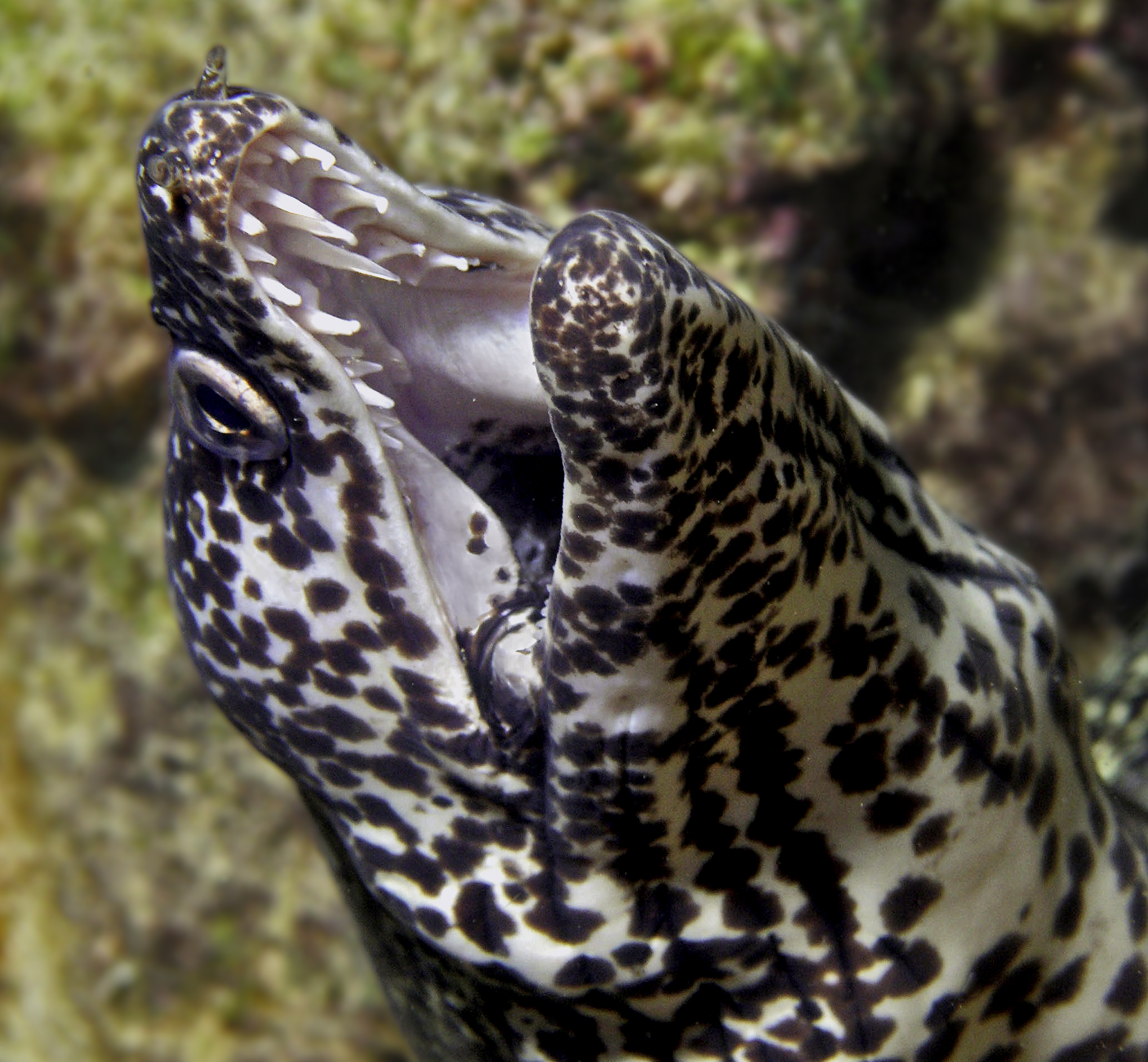
Spotted eels have double rows of teeth.

Spotted morays are solitary animals, and usually hide in narrow crevices and holes in reef structures with only their heads peeking out. They are active during the day, feeding on crustaceans, molluscs and fish at or near the sea bottom. Their bite can be dangerous to humans due to damage caused by the pull-back effect of the bite itself, and potential toxins that may be released into the wound. There is a minor fishery for spotted eels, and they are also kept in aquariums until their size makes it impractical to do so.
