= Amacayacu National Park =

Park along the Amazon River in the south of Colombia

Parque Nacional Natural Amacayacu
- Amacayacu National Natural Park
- IUCN category II (national park)
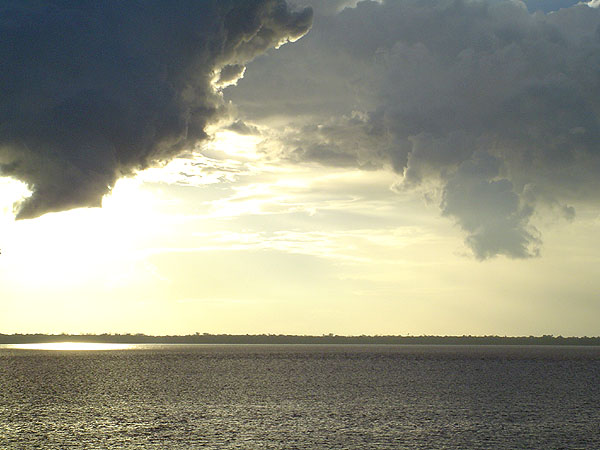
- Guamá River, tributary of the Amazon

- Location within Colombia
- Nearest city: Puerto Nariño, Colombia
- Coordinates: 03°29′S 70°12′W
- Area: 2,935 km^{2} (1,133 sq mi)
- Established: 1975
- Governing body: SINAP

Amacayacu National Natural Park (Spanish: Parque Nacional Natural Amacayacu) is a national park located along the Amazon River in the Amazonas Department in the south of Colombia. The word "Amacayacu" means "River of the Hammocks" in the indigenous language Quechua. The Ticuna people currently inhabit a part of the park.

The park comprises 4,220 square kilometres of jungle, a significant portion of which is annually flooded by the Amazon River during the wet season. The park's elevations vary from 200 to 300 meters above sea level, and temperatures in the park vary only slightly on an annual basis, from 26 to 28 degrees Celsius.

The park is of considerable interest to scientists. Many zoological specimens have been collected in the park.

== Traveling ==
In order to travel to the Amacayacu National Park, travelers must arrive in the city of Leticia then embark by boat upriver to the park itself. In the park visitors can do different activities such as trips along the Amazon river to different islands like Isla de los Micos where you can find hundreds of monkeys, Mocagua's island where one can see Victoria Regia or lotus flower and one of the most interesting activities: a trip up the Amazon River to Tarapoto Lake which has botos (Amazon river dolphins).

The park includes accommodations that consists of a maloca where travelers can sleep with a group of people in hammocks or cabins for 2 to 4 travelers.

Travelers must be very careful about mosquitos when the sun goes down. Travelers are advised to wear shirts with long sleeves and long trousers.

== History ==
The park was created in 1975. In 1970, Julia Allen Field (1927-2010), the American founder and President of Amazonia 2000, asked INDERENA (The Institute for Natural Resources, Colombia's equivalent to the U.S. Department of the Interior, now called The National Institute of Renewable Natural Resources and Environment) to establish a protected forest and wildlife sanctuary, including jaguars, around the research station she built called La Manigua on the Cothué River. (3°10'58.8"S 70°12'00.0"W)

In 1975, Julio Carrizosa, the Director of INDERENA, achieved the creation of Amacayacu National Park, an area of approximately 4,220 square kilometers of jungle. He also courageously banned hunting for the international skin trade (e.g., jaguar, ocelot, deer), which had fueled the local economy.

On September 30, 1975, in Tarapacá, Colombia, a town closest to La Manigua, the Chief of Forestry, Fidel Castillo, and Alirio Muñoz, the town's Mayor, announced the establishment of the national park and the ban on all cutting of the forests for lumber. Castillo credited Field with inspiring the park, saying to all assembled, "Your name is written across the map."
