= El mono Hernández Cork Forest Flora and Fauna Sanctuary =

Santuario de Fauna y Flora El Corchal "El mono Hernández"
- "El mono Hernández" Cork Forest Flora and Fauna Sanctuary
- IUCN category III (natural monument or feature)
- Location within Colombia
- Coordinates: 10°3′0″N 75°20′0″W
- Area: 38.5 km^{2} (14.9 sq mi)
- Established: 5 August 2002
- Governing body: SINAP

The "El mono Hernández" Cork Forest Flora and Fauna Sanctuary (Spanish: Santuario de Fauna y Flora El Corchal "El mono Hernández") is a natural monument, located in the Sucre and Bolívar Departments. It is on the coast of the Caribbean Region of Colombia.

The park is named in honor of Colombian naturalist Jorge Ignacio "El Mono" Hernández-Camacho (1935–2001), one of the founders of Colombia's National Natural Park System.

Climate28 °C is the average temperature, and there is 1100 mm of precipitation annually, with the heaviest months being April and November. June and July are the warmest months, and December through April are the driest.

== Flora and fauna ==
Mangrove and cork swamp forests are protected within the area. Mangroves covers about half of the area, located in the western and northern parts of the sanctuary. The mangroves are dominated by red mangrove, black mangrove, white mangrove, buttonwood. The swamps are the only place in the Colombian Caribbean Region where pure corchales, "cork" forests, grow, dominated by Pterocarpus officinalis, and with a total area of 401 hectares.

It is home to 153 species of birds, the great diversity is due to the quantity of food produced in the surrounding waters. A number of species feed on the marsh vegetation, including the endangered West Indian manatee. Other noteworthy animals are the jaguar, brown caiman and howler monkey.
