= Playona Acandí Fauna and Flora Sanctuary =

National park in Colombia

The Gulf of Darién (Spanish: Golfo de Darién)

Playona Acandí Fauna and Flora Sanctuary is one of eleven new national parks in Colombia. It is the home of the Cana Turtle (Dermochelys coriacea). This park is on the (Uraba Gulf) Caribbean coast of the Department of Chocó. The Playon Playona Acandí Fauna and Flora Sanctuary is a strategic area for the survival of the hawksbill and leatherback turtles, the latter considered to be the world's largest sea turtle.

With a total extension of 26,232 hectares, it is located in the Gulf of Darién on the Caribbean Coast, within the jurisdiction of the Municipality of Acandí, encompassing the beach and adjacent marine waters next to La Playona and some part of El Playón de Acandí.

This zone is considered to be one of the main nesting sites of the leatherback sea turtle. Several authors and researchers belonging to the local Afro community (GILA group) state that each year over 200 turtles reach these beaches to lay their eggs. The Darién area and, particularly, the Acandí beaches, are equally important sites for the nesting of the hawksbill turtle in the Caribbean.

The selection of the two beaches contributes directly to the protection of these two species which are critically endangered. Their migratory nature makes this area really important since all the local conservation efforts have a significant impact on the western Caribbean. Mark and recapture studies have shown that some of the females breeding in Colombia spend most of the year in Costa Rica and Mexico. In addition, this area contributes to the protection of other animals that are socially, economically and culturally important, including several shrimps and fish.

Local communities adjacent to La Playona and Playón de Acandí consider the leatherback turtle a symbol and part of the region's cultural, touristic and ecological heritage. For instance, on Easter 1993 the "Leatherback Turtle Festival" began as a strategy to create awareness of the importance of this species. The area also contributes to maintain marine biodiversity and the artisanal fisheries of Urabá and Darién. More than 80 species make up the fishing resources for the community of Acandí.

Since the beginning, the declaration of this new protected area was sought by the Afro Communities Councils of the Tolo River Basin and the Southern Coastal Zone (Cocomasur); the Acandí Seco River Basin, El Cedro and El Juancho (Cocomaseco) and the Acandí River and the Northern Coastal Zone (Cocomanorte). It was also supported, through technical collaboration by WWF Colombia during almost 10 years. In order to properly manage the planning of the Sanctuary, a coordination mechanism will be established among the three community councils and National Parks to achieve the conservation goals.
