= Puinawai Natural Reserve =

- IUCN category II (national park)
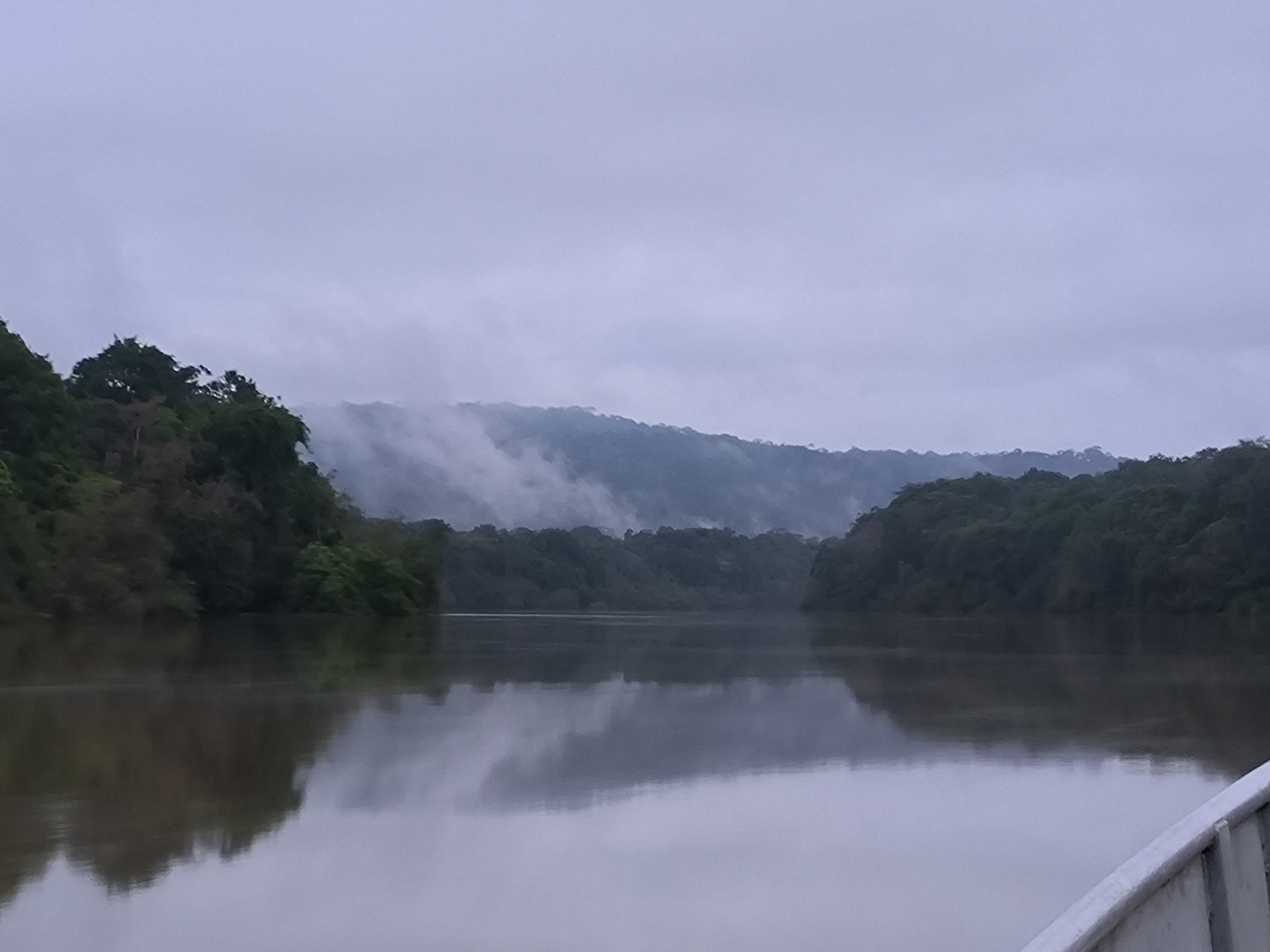
- The Inírida River flowing through the reserve

- Location within Colombia
- Location: Guainía, Colombia
- Nearest city: Inírida
- Coordinates: 2°19′47″N 69°00′39″W
- Area: 10,925 square kilometres (4,218 mi^{2})
- Established: 1989

Puinawai Natural Reserve (Spanish: Reserva Nacional Natural Puinawai) is the second-largest national park in Colombia. This protected area occupies 10,925 square kilometres (4,218 mi^{2}) of the Amazon Region of Colombia, roughly 15% of the Guainía Department. The Reserve was created in September 1989 and coincides with three important indigenous territories that were also formed at the same time. Several rivers cross the Natural Reserve belonging to the Amazon River basin: the Cuyari, Isana and Guainía Rivers. The Inírida River, belonging to the Orinoco River basin, also flows through the reserve. Puinawai lies between altitude of 200 to 380 metres (660 to 1,250 ft) above sea level and its climate is hot and humid with little seasonal variations throughout the year.

== Ecosystem ==
The area of the Puinawai Natural Reserve mainly consists of humid tropical rainforest. However, there are also tropical open savanna and transitional zones. Pressure from deforestation has so far remained relatively small, due to the area's inaccessibility and low population density. According to Colombia's national park services, 1% of Puinawai has been deforested.

There are 419 endemic plant species in the natural reserve, 176 of which are endemic in the whole Guyana Shield. The reserve is also rich in fauna with many local species that were preserved also due to the local indigenous tribes practicing a sustainable co-existence with the local environment. The Puinawai Natural Reserve is not open to the public.
