= Invasive species in Colombia =

Invasive species are a serious threat to the native biodiversity of Colombia, located in northern South America.

Invasive plants and invasive insect pests are an ongoing cost to Colombia agriculture.
