= National System of Protected Areas (Colombia) =

The National System of Protected Areas (Spanish: Sistema Nacional de Áreas Protegidas) (SINAP) is the Colombian national park administrator. It is a department under the Ministry of the Environment, Housing and Regional Development responsible for the conservation and sustainable use of biological diversity. SINAP was established after Colombia signed the Convention on Biological Diversity through Law 165 of 1994, and has been the primary activity of the Colombian Government regarding the conservation of biodiversity. The areas of the Park System supply 25 million people with water.

In total 59 areas belong to the National Natural Parks System, covering 16,954,500 hectares (65,462 sq mi).

The areas are categorized in six divisions, defined in Article 329 of Código de Recursos Naturales (CNR): national parks (parques nacionales), flora and fauna sanctuaries (santuarios de fauna y flora), flora sanctuaries (santuarios de flora), nature reserves (reserva natural), unique natural areas (área natural única) and road parks (vía parque).

== See also ==
- List of national parks of Colombia
