= List of Lepanthes species =

Lepanthes is one of the largest genera of flowering plants in the world, with over 1000 species:

== A ==
- Lepanthes abitaguae Luer & L.Jost
- Lepanthes abortiva Luer & R.Escobar
- Lepanthes absens Luer & Hirtz
- Lepanthes acarina Luer
- Lepanthes aciculifolia Luer
- Lepanthes acoridilabia Ames & C.Schweinf.
- Lepanthes acrogenia Luer & R.Escobar
- Lepanthes actias-luna Luer & Hirtz
- Lepanthes aculeata Luer
- Lepanthes acuminata Schltr.
- Lepanthes acunae Hespenh.
- Lepanthes acutissima Luer & R.Escobar
- Lepanthes adamsii Hespenh.
- Lepanthes adelphe Luer & Hirtz
- Lepanthes adrianae Luer
- Lepanthes aduncata Luer & R.Escobar
- Lepanthes aeora Luer & Hirtz
- Lepanthes affinis Luer & R.Escobar
- Lepanthes aggeris Luer & R.Escobar
- Lepanthes agglutinata Luer
- Lepanthes aguirrei Luer
- Lepanthes aithalos Carnevali & I.Ramírez in G.A.Romero & G.Carnevali
- Lepanthes alcicornis Luer & R.Escobar
- Lepanthes alkaia Luer & R.Escobar
- Lepanthes allector Luer & R.Escobar
- Lepanthes almolongae Luer & Béhar
- Lepanthes alopex Luer & Hirtz
- Lepanthes alticola C.Schweinf.
- Lepanthes alvarezii P.Ortiz
- Lepanthes amabilis Luer
- Lepanthes amphioxa Luer & Hirtz
- Lepanthes amplectens Luer & Hermans
- Lepanthes amplior Luer & R.Escobar
- Lepanthes amplisepala Luer & R.Escobar
- Lepanthes anatina Luer & R.Escobar
- Lepanthes anchorifera Luer
- Lepanthes ancylopetala Dressler
- Lepanthes andreettae Luer
- Lepanthes anfracta Garay & Dunst.
- Lepanthes angulata Luer & Hirtz
- Lepanthes anisoloba Dod ex Luer
- Lepanthes ankistra Luer & Dressler
- Lepanthes anserina Luer & R.Escobar
- Lepanthes antennata Luer & R.Escobar
- Lepanthes antennifera Luer & R.Escobar
- Lepanthes antilocapra Luer & Dressler
- Lepanthes antiopa Luer
- Lepanthes antioquiensis Schltr.
- Lepanthes aperta Luer
- Lepanthes apiculata Dod ex Luer
- Lepanthes appendiculata Ames
- Lepanthes applanata Luer & Sijm
- Lepanthes aprica Catling & V.R.Catling
- Lepanthes aprina Luer & L.Jost
- Lepanthes aquila-borussiae Rchb.f.
- Lepanthes arbaceae Luer & Cloes
- Lepanthes arbuscula Luer & R.Escobar
- Lepanthes arenasiana Bogarín & Mel.Fernández
- Lepanthes arethusa Luer & R.Escobar
- Lepanthes argentata Luer & R.Escobar
- Lepanthes ariasiana Luer & L.Jost
- Lepanthes aries Luer
- Lepanthes aristata Luer & R.Escobar
- Lepanthes asoma Luer & Hirtz
- Lepanthes athena Luer
- Lepanthes atomifera Luer & R.Escobar
- Lepanthes atrata Endres ex Luer
- Lepanthes attenuata Salazar
- Lepanthes atwoodii Luer
- Lepanthes aubryi Luer & H.P.Jesup
- Lepanthes auditor Luer & R.Escobar
- Lepanthes aurea Urb.
- Lepanthes aures-asini Luer & R.Escobar
- Lepanthes auriculata Luer
- Lepanthes aurita Luer & R.Escobar
- Lepanthes aurorae D.E.Benn. & Christenson
- Lepanthes auspicata Luer & R.Escobar
- Lepanthes austinae Dod ex Luer
- Lepanthes avicularia Luer & Hirtz
- Lepanthes avis Rchb.f.

== B ==
- Lepanthes bahorucana Hespenh. & Dod
- Lepanthes ballatrix Luer
- Lepanthes barbae Schltr.
- Lepanthes barbatula Luer & R.Vásquez
- Lepanthes barbelifera Luer & Hirtz
- Lepanthes barbigera Luer & L.Jost
- Lepanthes barbosae Luer
- Lepanthes beatriziae Luer & R.Escobar
- Lepanthes beharii Luer
- Lepanthes benzingii Luer
- Lepanthes biappendiculata Luer
- Lepanthes bibarbullata Luer
- Lepanthes bifalcis Luer
- Lepanthes bifurcata Luer & R.Escobar
- Lepanthes biglomeris Luer & R.Escobar
- Lepanthes bilabiata Fawc. & Rendle
- Lepanthes biloba Lindl.
- Lepanthes binaria Luer & Hirtz
- Lepanthes bipinnatula Luer & R.Escobar
- Lepanthes bipollicaris Luer & Hirtz
- Lepanthes bitriangularis Luer & R.Escobar
- Lepanthes bituberculata Luer & Hirtz
- Lepanthes bivalvis Luer & Sijm
- Lepanthes blepharantha Schltr. in I.Urban
- Lepanthes blephariglossa Schltr.
- Lepanthes blepharistes Rchb.f.
- Lepanthes blepharophylla (Griseb.) Hespenh.
- Lepanthes boomerang Dod ex Luer
- Lepanthes boyacensis Luer & R.Escobar
- Lepanthes braccata Luer & Dod
- Lepanthes brachypogon Luer
- Lepanthes brachystele Salazar & Soto Arenas
- Lepanthes bradei Schltr.
- Lepanthes branchifera Luer & R.Vásquez
- Lepanthes brasiliensis Pabst
- Lepanthes breedlovei Salazar & Soto Arenas
- Lepanthes brenneri Luer
- Lepanthes brevis Luer & R.Vásquez
- Lepanthes brunnescens Luer
- Lepanthes bustyla Luer
- Lepanthes byfieldii Hespenh.

== C ==
- Lepanthes cacique-tone Luer & R.Escobar
- Lepanthes cactoura Luer & R.Escobar
- Lepanthes caesariata Luer & R.Escobar
- Lepanthes calimae P.Ortiz
- Lepanthes calliope Luer & Hirtz
- Lepanthes callisto Luer & Hirtz
- Lepanthes calocodon Luer
- Lepanthes calodictyon Hook.
- Lepanthes calopetala Salazar & Soto Arenas
- Lepanthes calophlebia Luer & Thoerle
- Lepanthes caloptera Luer
- Lepanthes caloura Luer & Hirtz
- Lepanthes caluffii E.González & Luer
- Lepanthes calypso Luer & Hirtz
- Lepanthes calyptrata Luer
- Lepanthes campodostele Luer & Hirtz
- Lepanthes camptica Luer & Hirtz
- Lepanthes canaliculata Luer & R.Escobar
- Lepanthes candida Endres ex Luer
- Lepanthes capistrata Luer & Sijm
- Lepanthes capitana Rchb.f.
- Lepanthes caprimulgus Luer
- Lepanthes caranqui Tobar & Monteros, 2021
- Lepanthes cardiocheila Luer & R.Escobar
- Lepanthes carinata Luer & Hirtz
- Lepanthes caritensis Tremblay & Ackerman
- Lepanthes caroli-lueri Bogarín & Pupulin
- Lepanthes carunculigera Rchb.f.
- Lepanthes carvii Archila
- Lepanthes casasae Pupulin
- Lepanthes cassicula Hespenh. & Dod
- Lepanthes cassidea Rchb.f.
- Lepanthes catella Luer & R.Escobar
- Lepanthes catlingii Salazar
- Lepanthes cauda-avis Luer
- Lepanthes caudata Luer & R.Escobar
- Lepanthes caudatisepala C.Schweinf.
- Lepanthes caudigera Luer & Hirtz
- Lepanthes caveroi D.E.Benn. & Christenson
- Lepanthes celox Luer & Hirtz
- Lepanthes cerambyx Luer & R.Escobar
- Lepanthes cercion Luer & R.Escobar
- Lepanthes chameleon Ames
- Lepanthes chapina Luer & Béhar
- Lepanthes chelonion Luer & R.Escobar
- Lepanthes chiangii Salazar
- Lepanthes chilopsis Luer & Hirtz
- Lepanthes chimaera Luer & R.Escobar
- Lepanthes chinapintae Luer
- Lepanthes chiriquensis Schltr.
- Lepanthes chorista Luer & Hirtz
- Lepanthes chrysina Luer & Hirtz
- Lepanthes chrysostigma Lindl.
- Lepanthes ciliaris Luer & Hirtz
- Lepanthes ciliicampa Luer & Hirtz
- Lepanthes ciliisepala Schltr.
- Lepanthes ciliolata Luer & R.Vásquez
- Lepanthes cincinnata Luer & R.Escobar
- Lepanthes cingens Luer & R.Escobar
- Lepanthes circularis Luer
- Lepanthes cirrata Luer & Hirtz
- Lepanthes clandestina Luer & Hirtz
- Lepanthes clareae Luer & Hermans
- Lepanthes clarkii Luer
- Lepanthes clausa Luer & R.Escobar
- Lepanthes cleistogama Archila
- Lepanthes climax Luer & R.Escobar
- Lepanthes cloesii Luer
- Lepanthes cobanensis Archila
- Lepanthes cocculifera Luer & R.Escobar
- Lepanthes cochleariifolia (Sw.) Sw.
- Lepanthes cochliops Luer & R.Vásquez
- Lepanthes coeloglossa Luer
- Lepanthes cogolloi Luer & R.Escobar
- Lepanthes columbar Luer
- Lepanthes comadresina Luer
- Lepanthes complicata Luer & R.Vásquez
- Lepanthes composita Luer & R.Escobar
- Lepanthes concavella Luer & Hirtz
- Lepanthes conchilabia Luer & Hirtz
- Lepanthes conchyliata Luer
- Lepanthes conconula Luer & Hirtz
- Lepanthes condorensis Luer & Hirtz
- Lepanthes confusa Ames & C.Schweinf.
- Lepanthes confusoides Luer
- Lepanthes conjuncta Luer & Hirtz
- Lepanthes constanzae Urb.
- Lepanthes contingens Luer
- Lepanthes convexa Hespenh.
- Lepanthes cordata Luer & R.Escobar
- Lepanthes cordeliae Luer
- Lepanthes cordilabia Luer
- Lepanthes corkyae Luer & Hirtz
- Lepanthes cornualis Luer & R.Escobar
- Lepanthes cornutipetala Dod
- Lepanthes corrugata Luer & Dalström
- Lepanthes costaricensis Schltr.
- Lepanthes costata Rchb.f.
- Lepanthes cotyledon Luer
- Lepanthes cotylisca Luer & Hirtz
- Lepanthes craticia Luer
- Lepanthes cremasta Luer & Hirtz
- Lepanthes cremersii Luer
- Lepanthes cribbii Pupulin
- Lepanthes crista-piscis Luer & R.Vásquez
- Lepanthes crista-pulli Luer & R.Escobar
- Lepanthes crucipetala Hespenh. & Dod
- Lepanthes crucis Luer & Hirtz
- Lepanthes cryptostele Salazar & Soto Arenas
- Lepanthes ctenophora Luer & Hirtz
- Lepanthes cuatrecasasii Luer
- Lepanthes cubensis Hespenh.
- Lepanthes cucullata Luer & R.Escobar
- Lepanthes culex Luer & R.Escobar
- Lepanthes cuneiformis Luer & R.Escobar
- Lepanthes cunicularis Luer & R.Escobar
- Lepanthes curiosa Luer
- Lepanthes cuspidata Luer
- Lepanthes cyanoptera Rchb.f.
- Lepanthes cyclochila Luer & R.Escobar ex Viveros & W.E.Higgins
- Lepanthes cymbium Luer & R.Escobar
- Lepanthes cyrillicola Luer & Llamacho
- Lepanthes cyrtostele Luer & Hirtz

== D ==
- Lepanthes dactyla Garay
- Lepanthes dactylina Luer
- Lepanthes dalessandroi Luer
- Lepanthes darioi Luer & R.Escobar
- Lepanthes dasyura Luer & R.Escobar
- Lepanthes davidsei Luer
- Lepanthes dawsonii Ames
- Lepanthes debedoutii P.Ortiz
- Lepanthes debilis Luer & R.Escobar
- Lepanthes decipiens Ames & C.Schweinf.
- Lepanthes declivis Luer & R.Escobar
- Lepanthes decoris Luer & Llamacho
- Lepanthes decurva Luer & Hirtz
- Lepanthes decussata Dod ex Luer
- Lepanthes deficiens Luer & R.Escobar
- Lepanthes deformis Luer & Hirtz
- Lepanthes deleastes Luer
- Lepanthes delhierroi Luer & Hirtz
- Lepanthes deliciasensis Luer & R.Escobar
- Lepanthes deliqua Luer
- Lepanthes demissa Luer
- Lepanthes denticulata Luer & Béhar
- Lepanthes destituta Luer & R.Escobar
- Lepanthes detecta Luer & Hirtz
- Lepanthes deutera Luer & Thoerle
- Lepanthes dewildei Luer & R.Escobar
- Lepanthes diabolica Luer & R.Escobar
- Lepanthes diaziae Luer
- Lepanthes dichroma Luer
- Lepanthes dictydion Luer & Hirtz
- Lepanthes dictyota Luer & R.Vásquez
- Lepanthes dicycla Luer & Hirtz
- Lepanthes dicyrtopetala Luer & Hirtz
- Lepanthes didactyla Luer & R.Escobar
- Lepanthes didyma Luer & Hirtz
- Lepanthes discolor Luer & R.Escobar
- Lepanthes disjuncta Luer & Hirtz
- Lepanthes disticha (A.Rich. & Galeotti) Garay & R.E.Schult.
- Lepanthes divaricata Fawc. & Rendle
- Lepanthes dodiana Stimson
- Lepanthes dodsonii Luer
- Lepanthes doeringii Archila
- Lepanthes dolabrata Luer & R.Escobar
- Lepanthes dolabriformis Luer
- Lepanthes domingensis Hespenh. & Dod
- Lepanthes dondodii Luer
- Lepanthes dorsalis Lindl.
- Lepanthes dotae Endres ex Luer
- Lepanthes dressleri Hespenh.
- Lepanthes droseroides Luer
- Lepanthes dryades Luer & R.Escobar
- Lepanthes duidensis Ames & C.Schweinf.
- Lepanthes dumbo Luer
- Lepanthes dunstervilleorum Foldats
- Lepanthes dussii Urb.

== E ==
- Lepanthes echidion Luer & R.Escobar
- Lepanthes echidna Luer & R.Vásquez
- Lepanthes echinata Luer & Cloes
- Lepanthes echo Luer & Hirtz
- Lepanthes eciliata Schltr.
- Lepanthes ectopa Luer
- Lepanthes edentula Luer
- Lepanthes effusa Schltr.
- Lepanthes ejecta Luer & Hirtz
- Lepanthes ekmanii Schltr. in I.Urban
- Lepanthes elaeanorae Foldats
- Lepanthes elaminata Luer & Hirtz
- Lepanthes elata Rchb.f.
- Lepanthes electilis Luer
- Lepanthes elegans Luer
- Lepanthes elegantula Schltr.
- Lepanthes elephantina Luer & R.Escobar
- Lepanthes elliptica Fawc. & Rendle
- Lepanthes elongata Luer & Hirtz
- Lepanthes eltoroensis Stimson
- Lepanthes elytrifera Luer & L.Jost
- Lepanthes embreei Luer & Hirtz
- Lepanthes empticia Luer & Béhar
- Lepanthes enca-barcenae Archila
- Lepanthes epibator Luer & R.Vásquez
- Lepanthes equicalceolata Luer & R.Escobar
- Lepanthes equus-frisiae Pupulin & H.Medina
- Lepanthes erepsis Luer & Hirtz
- Lepanthes erinacea Rchb.f.
- Lepanthes eriocampa Luer & Hirtz
- Lepanthes eros Luer & R.Escobar
- Lepanthes eruca Luer & Hirtz
- Lepanthes erucifera Luer & Sijm
- Lepanthes erythrocles Luer & R.Escobar
- Lepanthes erythrostanga Hespenh. & Dod
- Lepanthes erythroxantha Salazar & Soto Arenas
- Lepanthes escifera Luer & R.Escobar
- Lepanthes escobariana Garay
- Lepanthes esmeralda Luer & Hirtz
- Lepanthes estrellensis Ames
- Lepanthes eumeces Luer
- Lepanthes evansiae Luer & Hirtz
- Lepanthes exaltata Luer & R.Escobar
- Lepanthes excavata Dod ex Luer
- Lepanthes excedens Ames & Correll
- Lepanthes exigua Luer & L.Jost
- Lepanthes exilis C.Schweinf.
- Lepanthes eximia Ames
- Lepanthes exogena Luer & Hirtz
- Lepanthes exotica Hespenh. & Dod
- Lepanthes expansa Luer & Hirtz
- Lepanthes exposita Luer
- Lepanthes exserta Luer & Hirtz

== F ==
- Lepanthes falcata Luer & R.Vásquez
- Lepanthes falcifera Luer
- Lepanthes fascinata Luer
- Lepanthes felis Luer & R.Escobar
- Lepanthes ferax Luer & R.Escobar
- Lepanthes ferrelliae Luer
- Lepanthes fibulifera Luer & R.Escobar
- Lepanthes filamentosa Luer & Hirtz
- Lepanthes fimbriata Ames
- Lepanthes fiskei Luer
- Lepanthes fissa Luer & Hirtz
- Lepanthes flaccida Luer & Hirtz
- Lepanthes flexuosa Luer
- Lepanthes florencia Dod ex Luer
- Lepanthes floresii Luer & Hirtz
- Lepanthes focalis Luer
- Lepanthes fonnegrae Luer & R.Escobar
- Lepanthes forceps Luer & R.Escobar
- Lepanthes forcipifera Luer
- Lepanthes foreroi P.Ortiz
- Lepanthes foveata Luer & R.Escobar
- Lepanthes fractiflexa Ames & C.Schweinf.
- Lepanthes fratercula Luer & Béhar
- Lepanthes frigida Luer
- Lepanthes fuchsii Luer
- Lepanthes fuertesii Hespenh. & Dod
- Lepanthes fugiens Luer
- Lepanthes fulva Lindl.
- Lepanthes furcata Luer & R.Escobar
- Lepanthes furcatipetala Garay
- Lepanthes fusiformis Luer

== G ==
- Lepanthes gabriellae Salazar & Soto Arenas
- Lepanthes gaileana Luer & Hirtz
- Lepanthes galeottiana Salazar & Soto Arenas
- Lepanthes garayi T.Hashim.
- Lepanthes gargantua Rchb.f.
- Lepanthes gargoyla Luer & Hirtz
- Lepanthes gelata Luer & R.Escobar
- Lepanthes gemina Luer & R.Escobar
- Lepanthes geminipetala Luer & J.Portilla
- Lepanthes gemmula Luer & Hirtz
- Lepanthes generi Luer & Hirtz
- Lepanthes geniculata Luer & Béhar
- Lepanthes georgii Luer & R.Escobar
- Lepanthes gerardensis M.A.Blanco
- Lepanthes gibberosa Ames
- Lepanthes gin-ganii Luer & Thoerle
- Lepanthes giraldoi Luer
- Lepanthes glabella Luer & Hirtz
- Lepanthes glaberrima Luer & R.Vásquez
- Lepanthes glacensis Dod
- Lepanthes glicensteinii Luer
- Lepanthes glochidea Luer
- Lepanthes glomerulosa Luer & Hirtz
- Lepanthes gloris Luer & Hirtz
- Lepanthes glossites Luer
- Lepanthes gnoma Luer & Hirtz
- Lepanthes golbasto Luer & Hirtz
- Lepanthes golondrina Luer & R.Escobar
- Lepanthes gossamera Luer & Hirtz
- Lepanthes gracillima Endres ex Luer
- Lepanthes grandiflora Ames & C.Schweinf.
- Lepanthes gratiosa Pupulin & D.Jiménez
- Lepanthes greenwoodii Salazar & Soto Arenas
- Lepanthes grildrig Luer & R.Escobar
- Lepanthes grisebachiana Hespenh.
- Lepanthes grossiradix Luer & Hirtz
- Lepanthes grypha Luer
- Lepanthes guaduasensis Luer & R.Escobar
- Lepanthes guanacasensis Luer & R.Escobar
- Lepanthes guanacastensis Ames & C.Schweinf.
- Lepanthes guardiana Endres ex Luer
- Lepanthes guatemalensis Schltr.
- Lepanthes guerrerensis Salazar & Soto Arenas
- Lepanthes gustavo-romeroi Archila
- Lepanthes gustavoi Luer & R.Escobar
- Lepanthes gutula-sanguinis Luer & R.Escobar

== H ==
- Lepanthes habenifera Luer & R.Escobar
- Lepanthes hagsateri Salazar & Soto Arenas
- Lepanthes hamiltonii Luer
- Lepanthes hamulifera Luer
- Lepanthes hastata Luer
- Lepanthes helcium Luer & Hirtz
- Lepanthes helgae Luer & R.Escobar
- Lepanthes helicocephala Rchb.f.
- Lepanthes helleri A.D.Hawkes
- Lepanthes hemirhoda Garay
- Lepanthes heptapus Luer & R.Escobar
- Lepanthes hermansii Luer
- Lepanthes herpaga Hespenh. & Dod
- Lepanthes herrerae Luer & Béhar
- Lepanthes herzogii Luer
- Lepanthes hexapus Luer & R.Escobar
- Lepanthes hippocrepica Luer & R.Escobar
- Lepanthes hirpex Luer & R.Escobar
- Lepanthes hirsuta Hespenh. & Dod
- Lepanthes hirsutula Luer & Hirtz
- Lepanthes hirtzii Luer
- Lepanthes hispidosa Luer & L.Jost
- Lepanthes hoeijeri Luer
- Lepanthes hollymountensis Luer & H.P.Jesup
- Lepanthes homotaxis Luer & R.Escobar
- Lepanthes hondurensis Ames
- Lepanthes horichii Luer
- Lepanthes horribilis Luer & Hirtz
- Lepanthes horrida Rchb.f.
- Lepanthes hortensis Luer & R.Escobar
- Lepanthes hotteana Hespenh. & Dod
- Lepanthes hubeinii Luer
- Lepanthes huehuetenangensis Archila
- Lepanthes hughsonii Hespenh. & Dod
- Lepanthes hurgo Luer & Béhar
- Lepanthes hydrae Luer & L.Jost
- Lepanthes hymenoptera Luer & Hirtz
- Lepanthes hyphosa Luer & R.Escobar
- Lepanthes hystrix Luer & Hirtz

== I ==
- Lepanthes ibanezii Luer & Béhar
- Lepanthes ictalurus Luer
- Lepanthes ilensis Dodson
- Lepanthes illex Luer
- Lepanthes illinizae Luer & Hirtz
- Lepanthes imbricans Luer & R.Escobar
- Lepanthes imitator Luer & Hirtz
- Lepanthes implexa Luer & Hirtz
- Lepanthes imposita Luer & R.Escobar
- Lepanthes impotens Luer & R.Escobar
- Lepanthes inaequalis Schltr.
- Lepanthes inaequisepala Luer & J.J.Portilla
- Lepanthes inamoena Luer
- Lepanthes incantata Luer
- Lepanthes incisa Luer & R.Vásquez
- Lepanthes incredibilis Luer & R.Vásquez
- Lepanthes incurva Dod ex Luer
- Lepanthes inescata Luer
- Lepanthes ingridiana Luer
- Lepanthes inornata Schltr.
- Lepanthes insolita Luer & R.Escobar
- Lepanthes interiorubra Hespenh.
- Lepanthes intonsa Luer
- Lepanthes intricata Luer
- Lepanthes ionoptera Rchb.f.
- Lepanthes iricolor Luer
- Lepanthes irrasa Luer & R.Escobar
- Lepanthes isabeliae Archila
- Lepanthes isochila Luer
- Lepanthes isosceles Luer & R.Escobar

== J ==
- Lepanthes jackinpyxa Luer & Hirtz
- Lepanthes jamboeensis Luer & Hirtz
- Lepanthes jamesonii Lindl. ex Rchb.f.
- Lepanthes janitor Luer & R.Escobar
- Lepanthes janus Luer & R.Escobar
- Lepanthes jardinensis Luer & R.Escobar
- Lepanthes javieri Archila
- Lepanthes jayandella Luer
- Lepanthes jesupii Luer
- Lepanthes jimburae Luer & Hirtz
- Lepanthes jimenezii Schltr.
- Lepanthes johnsonii Ames
- Lepanthes josei Hespenh. & Dod
- Lepanthes jostii Luer
- Lepanthes jubata Luer
- Lepanthes jugum Luer
- Lepanthes juninensis Schltr.

== K ==
- Lepanthes katleri Luer
- Lepanthes koehleri Schltr.
- Lepanthes kuijtii Luer & Hirtz
- Lepanthes kokonuko J.S. Moreno & Pisso-Florez

== L ==
- Lepanthes labiata Luer
- Lepanthes laevis Luer
- Lepanthes lanceolata Hespenh.
- Lepanthes lancifolia Schltr.
- Lepanthes lappacea Luer
- Lepanthes larvina Luer & R.Escobar
- Lepanthes lasiopetala Garay & Dunst.
- Lepanthes latisepala Ames & C.Schweinf.
- Lepanthes laxa Luer & J.Portilla
- Lepanthes laxiflora Luer
- Lepanthes lehmannii Schltr.
- Lepanthes lenticularis Luer & Béhar
- Lepanthes ligiae Luer & R.Escobar
- Lepanthes ligulata Luer & Hirtz
- Lepanthes lilijae Foldats
- Lepanthes lilliputae Luer & R.Escobar
- Lepanthes limbata Luer & R.Escobar
- Lepanthes limbellata Endres ex Luer
- Lepanthes lindleyana Oerst. & Rchb.f. in H.G.Reichenbach
- Lepanthes linealis Luer & R.Escobar
- Lepanthes linguifera Garay & Dunst.
- Lepanthes lingulosa Luer & R.Escobar
- Lepanthes llamachoi Luer
- Lepanthes llanganatensis Luer & Hirtz
- Lepanthes llipiensis Luer
- Lepanthes lloensis Luer
- Lepanthes loboauriculatus Archila
- Lepanthes loddigesiana Rchb.f.
- Lepanthes longiacuminata Luer & Hirtz
- Lepanthes longiloba Dod ex Luer
- Lepanthes longipedicellata C.Schweinf.
- Lepanthes longiracemosa Foldats
- Lepanthes lophius Luer
- Lepanthes lucifer Luer & Hirtz
- Lepanthes luisii Archila
- Lepanthes lunaris Luer
- Lepanthes lupula Luer & Hirtz
- Lepanthes lycocephala Luer & R.Escobar
- Lepanthes lymphosa Luer & Hermans
- Lepanthes lynniana Luer

== M ==
- Lepanthes macalpinii Luer
- Lepanthes maccolmiana Luer
- Lepanthes machogaffensis Pupulin & D.Jiménez
- Lepanthes machorroi Salazar & Soto Arenas
- Lepanthes macrantha Garay
- Lepanthes macrostylis Luer & R.Escobar
- Lepanthes macrotica Luer & Dalström
- Lepanthes maduroi Luer
- Lepanthes magnifica Luer
- Lepanthes magnipetala Dod ex Luer
- Lepanthes mairae D.E.Benn. & Christenson
- Lepanthes maldonadoae Soto Arenas
- Lepanthes mammillata Luer
- Lepanthes manabina Dodson
- Lepanthes marahuacensis Carnevali & I.Ramírez
- Lepanthes marcanoi Hespenh. & Dod
- Lepanthes mariae Salazar
- Lepanthes mariposa Luer
- Lepanthes marshana Luer & L.Jost
- Lepanthes martae Luer
- Lepanthes marthae Luer & R.Escobar
- Lepanthes martineae Luer & Cloes
- Lepanthes martinezii Salazar & Soto Arenas
- Lepanthes mastix Luer & Hirtz
- Lepanthes matudana Salazar & Soto Arenas
- Lepanthes maxillaris Luer & Hirtz
- Lepanthes maxima Salazar & Soto Arenas
- Lepanthes maxonii Schltr.
- Lepanthes mayordomoensis L.Jost & Luer
- Lepanthes mazatlanensis Solano & Reynaud
- Lepanthes medusa Luer & R.Escobar
- Lepanthes mefueensis Luer & R.Escobar
- Lepanthes megalocephala Luer & R.Vásquez
- Lepanthes megalostele Luer
- Lepanthes meganthera Luer & Hirtz
- Lepanthes mekynochila Garay & Dunst.
- Lepanthes melanocaulon Schltr. in I.Urban
- Lepanthes meleagris Luer & R.Escobar
- Lepanthes melpomene Luer & Hirtz
- Lepanthes membranacea Luer & Hirtz
- Lepanthes menatoi Luer & R.Vásquez
- Lepanthes mendozae Luer & D'Aless.
- Lepanthes meniscophora Luer & Hirtz
- Lepanthes meniskos Garay & Dunst.
- Lepanthes mentosa Luer
- Lepanthes mephistopheles Luer & Hirtz
- Lepanthes micellilabia Luer & R.Escobar
- Lepanthes microdonta Dod ex Luer
- Lepanthes microglottis Schltr.
- Lepanthes micronyx Luer & R.Escobar
- Lepanthes micropetala L.O.Williams
- Lepanthes microprosartima Tobar & M.J.Gavil., 2021
- Lepanthes microscopica Luer & R.Escobar
- Lepanthes migueliana Luer & Béhar
- Lepanthes mimetica Garay & Dunst.
- Lepanthes miniflora Dod ex Luer
- Lepanthes minima Salazar & Soto Arenas
- Lepanthes minutilabia Ames & C.Schweinf.
- Lepanthes minutipetala C.Schweinf.
- Lepanthes minutissima Endres ex Luer
- Lepanthes minyglossa Luer
- Lepanthes mirabilis Ames
- Lepanthes miraculum Luer & R.Vásquez
- Lepanthes mirador Luer & Hirtz
- Lepanthes mittelstaedtii Luer & Béhar
- Lepanthes mixe Salazar & Soto Arenas
- Lepanthes mollis Luer
- Lepanthes monilia Luer & R.Escobar
- Lepanthes monitor Luer
- Lepanthes mononeura Luer & Hermans
- Lepanthes monoptera Lindl.
- Lepanthes monteverdensis Luer & R.Escobar
- Lepanthes montis-narae Pupulin
- Lepanthes montis-rotundi P.Ortiz
- Lepanthes mooreana Luer & L.Jost
- Lepanthes moorei C.Schweinf.
- Lepanthes morleyi Luer & Dalström
- Lepanthes mornicola Urb.
- Lepanthes moscosoi Hespenh. & Dod
- Lepanthes motozintlensis Salazar & Soto Arenas
- Lepanthes mucronata Lindl.
- Lepanthes mulleriana Luer
- Lepanthes multiflora C.D.Adams & Hespenh.
- Lepanthes muscula Luer & R.Escobar
- Lepanthes myiophora Luer
- Lepanthes myoxophora Luer & R.Escobar
- Lepanthes mystax Luer & R.Escobar

== N ==
- Lepanthes nagelii Salazar & Soto Arenas
- Lepanthes nana Luer & H.P.Jesup
- Lepanthes nanegalensis Rchb.f.
- Lepanthes narcissus Luer & Hirtz
- Lepanthes nasariana J.S.Moreno & Hazzi
- Lepanthes nautilus Luer & R.Escobar
- Lepanthes navicularis Luer
- Lepanthes nebulina Luer & R.Vásquez
- Lepanthes necae Archila
- Lepanthes necopina Luer & Hirtz
- Lepanthes neillii L.Jost
- Lepanthes nematodes Luer & R.Escobar
- Lepanthes nematostele Luer
- Lepanthes nicolasii Luer & R.Escobar
- Lepanthes nidiagongorana Gal.-Tar., J.S.Moreno, Zuluaga & Sierra-Ariza
- Lepanthes niesseniae Luer
- Lepanthes nigriscapa R.E.Schult. & Dillon
- Lepanthes niphas Luer & R.Escobar
- Lepanthes nitida Luer & Hirtz
- Lepanthes nivea Luer
- Lepanthes noelii Luer & Béhar
- Lepanthes nontecta Luer
- Lepanthes norae Foldats
- Lepanthes nubicola Rchb.f.
- Lepanthes nulla Luer & R.Escobar
- Lepanthes nummularia Rchb.f.
- Lepanthes nutanticaulis Hespenh. & Dod
- Lepanthes nycteris Luer & R.Vásquez
- Lepanthes nymphalis Luer

== O ==
- Lepanthes oaxacana Salazar
- Lepanthes obliquiloba Hespenh.
- Lepanthes obovata Luer & R.Escobar
- Lepanthes obtusa Fawc. & Rendle
- Lepanthes obtusipetala (Fawc. & Rendle) Fawc. & Rendle
- Lepanthes occidentalis Hespenh.
- Lepanthes octavioi Luer & R.Escobar
- Lepanthes octocornuta Luer
- Lepanthes octopus Luer & R.Escobar
- Lepanthes odobenella Luer & Hirtz
- Lepanthes odontocera Luer & Hirtz
- Lepanthes odontolabis Luer
- Lepanthes ollaris Luer & R.Escobar
- Lepanthes olmosii Bogarín
- Lepanthes omnifera Luer & Hirtz
- Lepanthes opetidion Luer & R.Escobar
- Lepanthes ophelma Luer & R.Escobar
- Lepanthes ophioglossa Luer
- Lepanthes ophiostele Luer
- Lepanthes orbella Luer
- Lepanthes orchestris Luer & R.Vásquez
- Lepanthes ordonezii Luer & Béhar
- Lepanthes oreibates Luer & R.Escobar
- Lepanthes oreocharis Schltr.
- Lepanthes oreophila Catling & V.R.Catling
- Lepanthes orion Luer & R.Escobar
- Lepanthes ornithocephala L.Jost & Luer
- Lepanthes oro-lojaensis Tobar & M.F.Lopez, 2021
- Lepanthes ortegae Luer & Hirtz
- Lepanthes oscarii Archila
- Lepanthes oscarrodrigoi Archila & Chiron
- Lepanthes oscillifera Luer & R.Escobar
- Lepanthes osiris Luer & R.Escobar
- Lepanthes ostraconopetala Luer & Hirtz
- Lepanthes otara Luer
- Lepanthes oteroi Luer
- Lepanthes otopetala Luer
- Lepanthes ova-rajae Luer
- Lepanthes ovalis (Sw.) Fawc. & Rendle
- Lepanthes oxapampaensis D.E.Benn. & Christenson
- Lepanthes oxybaphon Luer & R.Escobar
- Lepanthes oxypetala Luer & Hirtz
- Lepanthes oxyphylla Luer & R.Vásquez

== P ==
- Lepanthes pachoi Luer & R.Escobar
- Lepanthes pachyglossa Luer
- Lepanthes pachyphylla Luer & Béhar
- Lepanthes paivaeana Rchb.f.
- Lepanthes palaga Luer & R.Escobar
- Lepanthes palatoflora Hespenh. & Dod
- Lepanthes palpebralis Luer
- Lepanthes pan Luer & Dalström
- Lepanthes panicellus Luer & R.Vásquez
- Lepanthes panisca Luer & R.Vásquez
- Lepanthes panope Luer & R.Escobar
- Lepanthes pantomima Luer & Dressler
- Lepanthes papallactae Luer & Hirtz
- Lepanthes papilio Luer & R.Vásquez
- Lepanthes papilionacea Salazar
- Lepanthes papillipetala Dressler
- Lepanthes papyrophylla Rchb.f.
- Lepanthes paradoxa Luer
- Lepanthes pariaensis Foldats
- Lepanthes parmata Luer & R.Escobar
- Lepanthes parvilabia Luer
- Lepanthes parvula Dressler
- Lepanthes pastoensis Schltr.
- Lepanthes pastorellii D.E.Benn. & Christenson
- Lepanthes pectinata Luer
- Lepanthes pecunialis Luer & Hirtz
- Lepanthes pedunculata Luer & Sijm
- Lepanthes pelorostele Luer & Hirtz
- Lepanthes pelvis Pupulin & D.Jiménez
- Lepanthes pelyx Luer & Hirtz
- Lepanthes pendens Garay
- Lepanthes pendula Luer & L.Jost
- Lepanthes penicillata Hespenh. & Dod
- Lepanthes penicillifera Luer
- Lepanthes pentoxys Luer
- Lepanthes perdita Luer & Hirtz
- Lepanthes pergracilis Schltr. in I.Urban
- Lepanthes persimilis Luer & Sijm
- Lepanthes petalolenta Luer & R.Escobar
- Lepanthes petalopteryx Luer & R.Escobar
- Lepanthes pexa Luer
- Lepanthes phalloides Luer & R.Escobar
- Lepanthes pholeter Luer
- Lepanthes phrixothrix Luer & Hirtz
- Lepanthes pictilis Luer & Hirtz
- Lepanthes piepolis Dod
- Lepanthes pileata Luer & R.Vásquez
- Lepanthes pilosa Luer & R.Vásquez
- Lepanthes pilosella Rchb.f.
- Lepanthes pilosiaures Luer & R.Escobar
- Lepanthes pinnatula Luer & R.Escobar
- Lepanthes planadensis Luer & R.Escobar
- Lepanthes platysepala Luer & R.Escobar
- Lepanthes plectilis Luer & Hirtz
- Lepanthes pleurorachis Luer
- Lepanthes pleurothallopsis Luer & R.Escobar
- Lepanthes plumifera Luer
- Lepanthes poasensis Luer
- Lepanthes politilabia Dod ex Luer
- Lepanthes pollardii Hespenh.
- Lepanthes polytricha Luer
- Lepanthes popayanensis Luer & R.Escobar
- Lepanthes porracea Luer & R.Escobar
- Lepanthes portillae Luer
- Lepanthes posadae Luer & R.Escobar
- Lepanthes posthon Luer
- Lepanthes praemorsa Luer & R.Escobar
- Lepanthes pretiosa Luer & Hirtz
- Lepanthes privigna Luer & L.Jost
- Lepanthes proboscidis Luer & Hirtz
- Lepanthes proctorii Garay & Hespenh.
- Lepanthes prolifera Foldats
- Lepanthes prora Luer
- Lepanthes protuberans Luer & P.Jesup
- Lepanthes pseudocaulescens L.B.Sm. & S.K.Harris
- Lepanthes pseudomucronata L.Jost & Luer
- Lepanthes psomion Luer & Hirtz
- Lepanthes psyche Luer
- Lepanthes pteroglossa Dod ex Luer
- Lepanthes pteropogon Rchb.f.
- Lepanthes pterygion Luer & R.Escobar
- Lepanthes ptyxis Luer & R.Vásquez
- Lepanthes pubes Luer & R.Escobar
- Lepanthes pubescens Luer
- Lepanthes pubicaulis C.Schweinf.
- Lepanthes puck Luer & R.Vásquez
- Lepanthes pulchella (Sw.) Sw.
- Lepanthes pulcherrima Endrés ex Bogarín & Pupulin
- Lepanthes pumila C.Schweinf.
- Lepanthes purpurata L.O.Williams
- Lepanthes purpurea Luer
- Lepanthes purulhaensis Archila
- Lepanthes pycnogenia Luer
- Lepanthes pygmaea Luer
- Lepanthes pyramidalis Luer & R.Escobar

== Q ==
- Lepanthes quadrata Fawc. & Rendle
- Lepanthes quadricornis Luer & R.Escobar
- Lepanthes quadrispatulata Dod
- Lepanthes quandi Luer & R.Escobar
- Lepanthes quasimodo Luer
- Lepanthes quaternaria Luer
- Lepanthes quetzalensis Luer & Béhar
- Lepanthes quisqueyana Hespenh. & Dod

== R ==
- Lepanthes rabei Foldats
- Lepanthes racemosa Luer & Hirtz
- Lepanthes rafaeliana Pupulin
- Lepanthes ramonensis Schltr.
- Lepanthes ramosii Luer
- Lepanthes rauhii Luer
- Lepanthes recurva Luer & Hirtz
- Lepanthes refracta Luer
- Lepanthes regularis Luer
- Lepanthes rekoi R.E.Schult.
- Lepanthes renzii Luer
- Lepanthes repens Luer
- Lepanthes reticulata Luer & R.Escobar
- Lepanthes retusa Luer & Hermans
- Lepanthes reventador Luer & Hirtz
- Lepanthes revoluta Luer & Cloes
- Lepanthes rhodophylla Schltr.
- Lepanthes rhynchion Luer
- Lepanthes ribes Luer
- Lepanthes ricaurtensis Luer & R.Escobar
- Lepanthes ricii Luer & R.Vásquez
- Lepanthes ricina Luer & Dalström
- Lepanthes ridicula Luer
- Lepanthes rigidigitata Luer & Hirtz
- Lepanthes ringens Luer & R.Vásquez
- Lepanthes rodrigogonzalesii Archila
- Lepanthes rodrigoi Luer
- Lepanthes roezliana Luer & R.Escobar
- Lepanthes rosoria Luer & Hirtz
- Lepanthes rostrata Ames
- Lepanthes rotundata Griseb.
- Lepanthes rotundifolia L.O.Williams
- Lepanthes rubripetala Stimson
- Lepanthes rubrolineata Luer & Hirtz
- Lepanthes rudicula Luer & Hirtz
- Lepanthes rudipetala Hespenh. & Dod
- Lepanthes rupestris Stimson
- Lepanthes rupicola Schltr.
- Lepanthes ruscifolia Rchb.f.
- Lepanthes ruthiana Luer & L.Jost
- Lepanthes rutkisii Foldats
- Lepanthes rutrum Luer & R.Escobar

== S ==
- Lepanthes saccata Luer & R.Escobar
- Lepanthes salazarii Archila
- Lepanthes salpiginosa Luer & Sijm
- Lepanthes saltator Luer
- Lepanthes saltatrix Luer & Hirtz
- Lepanthes samacensis Ames
- Lepanthes sanguinea Hook.
- Lepanthes sannio Luer & R.Escobar
- Lepanthes satyrica Luer & Hirtz
- Lepanthes scalaris Luer
- Lepanthes scansor Luer & R.Escobar
- Lepanthes scapha Luer & Hirtz
- Lepanthes schiedei Rchb.f.
- Lepanthes schizix Luer
- Lepanthes schizocardia Luer
- Lepanthes schizura Luer
- Lepanthes schnitteri Schltr.
- Lepanthes schugii Pupulin
- Lepanthes schultesii Salazar & Soto Arenas
- Lepanthes scolex Luer
- Lepanthes scolops Luer & R.Vásquez
- Lepanthes scopula Schltr.
- Lepanthes scopulifera Luer & R.Escobar
- Lepanthes scrotifera Luer & Hirtz
- Lepanthes seegeri Luer
- Lepanthes selenitepala Rchb.f.
- Lepanthes selliana Endres ex Luer
- Lepanthes semilaminata Luer & Hirtz
- Lepanthes semperflorens Dod ex Luer
- Lepanthes serialina Luer & L.Jost
- Lepanthes sericinitens Luer & R.Escobar
- Lepanthes series Luer & Hirtz
- Lepanthes serriola Luer & R.Vásquez
- Lepanthes setifera Luer & R.Escobar
- Lepanthes sigsigensis Luer & Hirtz
- Lepanthes sijmii Luer & Sijm
- Lepanthes silenus Luer & Hirtz
- Lepanthes sillarensis Schltr.
- Lepanthes silvae H.Dietr.
- Lepanthes silverstonei Luer
- Lepanthes similis Luer
- Lepanthes simplex Hespenh.
- Lepanthes singularis Luer & Hirtz
- Lepanthes sinuosa Luer & R.Escobar
- Lepanthes skeleton Luer & R.Escobar
- Lepanthes smaragdina Luer & R.Escobar
- Lepanthes sobrina Luer & Hirtz
- Lepanthes solicitor Luer & R.Escobar
- Lepanthes sororcula Luer & Hirtz
- Lepanthes sotoana Pupulin
- Lepanthes sotoi Archila
- Lepanthes sousae Salazar & Soto Arenas
- Lepanthes spadariae Pupulin
- Lepanthes speciosa Luer & Hirtz
- Lepanthes spelynx Luer & R.Escobar
- Lepanthes splendida Luer & Hirtz
- Lepanthes spruceana L.Jost & Luer
- Lepanthes staatsiana Luer & L.Jost
- Lepanthes stalactites Luer & Hirtz
- Lepanthes standleyi Ames
- Lepanthes stefaniae Archila
- Lepanthes stegastes Luer & Hirtz
- Lepanthes stelidantha Garay & Dunst.
- Lepanthes stelidilabia Luer & R.Escobar
- Lepanthes stelidipetala Luer
- Lepanthes stellaris Luer & Hirtz
- Lepanthes stenophylla Schltr.
- Lepanthes stenorhyncha Luer
- Lepanthes stenoscleros Schltr.
- Lepanthes × stenosepala Luer & Béhar
- Lepanthes steyermarkii Foldats
- Lepanthes stimsonii Luer
- Lepanthes striatifolia Hespenh. & Dod
- Lepanthes strumosa Luer & R.Escobar
- Lepanthes stupenda Luer
- Lepanthes suarezii Salazar & Soto Arenas
- Lepanthes suavium Luer & Hirtz
- Lepanthes subalpina Urb.
- Lepanthes subdimidiata Ames & C.Schweinf.
- Lepanthes subulata Luer & R.Escobar
- Lepanthes sucumbiensis Luer & Hirtz
- Lepanthes sulcata Luer & Hirtz
- Lepanthes superposita Schltr.
- Lepanthes surrogata Luer & Hirtz
- Lepanthes sybax Luer & Hirtz
- Lepanthes synema Luer & Hirtz
- Lepanthes systole Luer

== T ==
- Lepanthes tachirensis Foldats
- Lepanthes tactiquensis Archila
- Lepanthes tamaensis Foldats
- Lepanthes tanekes Luer & R.Escobar
- Lepanthes teaguei Luer
- Lepanthes tecpanica Luer & Béhar
- Lepanthes tectorum Luer & Hirtz
- Lepanthes telipogoniflora Schuit. & A.de Wilde
- Lepanthes tentaculata Luer & Hirtz
- Lepanthes tenuiloba R.E.Schult. & Dillon
- Lepanthes tenuis Schltr. in I.Urban
- Lepanthes terborchii Luer & Sijm
- Lepanthes teres Luer
- Lepanthes teretipetala Hespenh. & Dod
- Lepanthes terpsichore Luer & Hirtz
- Lepanthes tetrachaeta Luer & L.Jost
- Lepanthes tetracola Luer & R.Escobar
- Lepanthes tetroptera Luer
- Lepanthes thalia Luer & Hirtz
- Lepanthes thoerleae Luer
- Lepanthes thoracica Luer & Hirtz
- Lepanthes thurstoniorum Salazar
- Lepanthes thylax Luer & Hirtz
- Lepanthes thysanota Luer & Hirtz
- Lepanthes tibouchinicola Luer & R.Escobar
- Lepanthes tigrina Luer & Thoerle
- Lepanthes tipulifera Rchb.f.
- Lepanthes titanica Luer & Hirtz
- Lepanthes tomentosa Luer
- Lepanthes tonduziana Schltr.
- Lepanthes tortilis Luer & Hirtz
- Lepanthes tortuosa Luer & Hirtz
- Lepanthes totontepecensis Salazar & Soto Arenas
- Lepanthes tracheia Rchb.f.
- Lepanthes transparens Luer
- Lepanthes triangularis Luer
- Lepanthes trichidion Luer
- Lepanthes trichocaulis Luer & R.Escobar
- Lepanthes trichodactyla Lindl.
- Lepanthes tricuspidata Luer & Sijm
- Lepanthes tricuspis Schltr.
- Lepanthes tridactyla Luer
- Lepanthes tridens Ames
- Lepanthes tridentata (Sw.) Sw.
- Lepanthes trifurcata Luer & R.Escobar
- Lepanthes trimerinx Luer
- Lepanthes trinaria Luer & R.Escobar
- Lepanthes triura (Lindl.) Schltr.
- Lepanthes troglodytes Luer & R.Escobar
- Lepanthes troxis Luer & R.Escobar
- Lepanthes trullifera Hespenh. & Dod
- Lepanthes truncata Luer & Dressler
- Lepanthes truncatipetala Dod ex Luer
- Lepanthes tsubotae Luer & R.Escobar
- Lepanthes tubuliflora Hespenh.
- Lepanthes tudiana Hespenh. & Dod
- Lepanthes × tuerckheimii Schltr.
- Lepanthes tungurahuae Luer & Hirtz
- Lepanthes turialvae Rchb.f.
- Lepanthes turquinoensis Schltr. in I.Urban

== U ==
- Lepanthes umbonata Luer & R.Escobar
- Lepanthes umbonifera Endres ex Luer
- Lepanthes uncifera Luer & R.Escobar
- Lepanthes unguicularis Hespenh.
- Lepanthes unijuga Luer & Dalström
- Lepanthes unitrinervis Carnevali & I.Ramírez
- Lepanthes urania Luer & Hirtz
- Lepanthes urbaniana Mansf.
- Lepanthes uribei Luer
- Lepanthes urotepala Rchb.f.
- Lepanthes ursula Luer & R.Escobar
- Lepanthes usitata Luer & R.Vásquez
- Lepanthes uvallensis Archila
- Lepanthes uxoria Luer & Hirtz

== V ==
- Lepanthes vaginans Luer & Hirtz
- Lepanthes vaginosa Luer & Hirtz
- Lepanthes valenciae Luer & R.Escobar
- Lepanthes valerioi Luer
- Lepanthes vareschii Garay
- Lepanthes vasquezii Luer
- Lepanthes vatrax Luer
- Lepanthes velata Luer & Hirtz
- Lepanthes veleziana Stimson
- Lepanthes velifera Luer & Béhar
- Lepanthes vellicata Luer & Hirtz
- Lepanthes venusta Luer & R.Escobar
- Lepanthes verapazensis Archila
- Lepanthes vermicularis Luer
- Lepanthes versicolor Luer & R.Vásquez
- Lepanthes vespa Luer & R.Vásquez
- Lepanthes vespertilio Rchb.f.
- Lepanthes vestigialis Bogarín & Pupulin
- Lepanthes via-incarum Luer & Hirtz
- Lepanthes viahoensis Luer & R.Escobar
- Lepanthes vibrissa Luer & Hirtz
- Lepanthes viebrockiana Luer & L.Jost
- Lepanthes vieirae Luer & R.Escobar
- Lepanthes villosa Løjtnant
- Lepanthes vinacea Hespenh.
- Lepanthes vivipara Salazar & Soto Arenas
- Lepanthes vogelii Luer & R.Vásquez
- Lepanthes volador Luer & Hirtz
- Lepanthes volsella Luer & R.Escobar
- Lepanthes volvox Luer & R.Escobar
- Lepanthes voodoo Tremblay & Ackerman
- Lepanthes vulpina Luer & Sijm

== W ==
- Lepanthes wageneri Rchb.
- Lepanthes wendlandii Rchb.f.
- Lepanthes wendtii Salazar & Soto Arenas
- Lepanthes werneri Luer
- Lepanthes whittenii Pupulin & Bogarín
- Lepanthes williamsii Salazar & Soto Arenas
- Lepanthes woodburyana Stimson
- Lepanthes woodfredensis Luer
- Lepanthes woodiana Fawc. & Rendle
- Lepanthes wrightii Rchb.f.
- Lepanthes wullschlaegelii Fawc. & Rendle

== X ==
- Lepanthes xenos Luer & Hirtz
- Lepanthes ximenae Luer

== Y ==
- Lepanthes yanganae Luer & Hirtz
- Lepanthes yunckeri Ames
- Lepanthes yuvilensis Catling

== Z ==
- Lepanthes zamorensis Luer & Hirtz
- Lepanthes zanklopetala Luer & Hirtz
- Lepanthes zapatae Luer & R.Escobar
- Lepanthes zapotensis Dod
- Lepanthes zelenkoi Luer & Hirtz
- Lepanthes zettleri Foldats
- Lepanthes zongoensis Luer
- Lepanthes zunagensis Luer & Hirtz
- Lepanthes zygion Luer
