= Epidendrum tridentatum =

The taxon Epidendrum tridentatum (species of orchids) refers to:

- Epidendrum tridentatum Fawc., a synonym of Epidendrum nutans,
- Epidendrum tridentatum Sw., a synonym of Lepanthes tridentata.
