= Lepanthes nidiagongorana =

Scientific classification
- Kingdom: Plantae
- Clade: Tracheophytes
- Clade: Angiosperms
- Clade: Monocots
- Order: Asparagales
- Family: Orchidaceae
- Subfamily: Epidendroideae
- Genus: Lepanthes
- Species: L. nidiagongorana

Binomial name
- Lepanthes nidiagongorana Gal.-Tar., J.S.Moreno, Zuluaga & Sierra-Ariza

Species of flowering plant

Lepanthes nidiagongorana is a species of flowering plant in the family Orchidaceae. It is an epiphyte with yellow and cream flowers. The species is native to Colombia, and was described in 2023.

== Taxonomy ==
Lepanthes nidiagongorana was named by Robinson Galindo-Tarazona, Juan Sebastián Moreno, Alejandro Zuluaga, and Mario Alexei Sierra-Ariza in 2023. The name was initially published invalidly, as a holotype herbarium was not specified. The same authors published the name validly in 2024.

== Distribution ==
Lepanthes nidiagongorana is native to the wet tropical biome of Colombia.

== Description ==
Lepanthes nidiagongorana is an epiphyte. It grows 3.6–4.1 centimetres (1.4–1.6 in) high. The roots are slender. The stems are slender, and 1.6–2.1 centimetres (0.63–0.83 in) long.

The leaves are dark purple, leathery, and 1.73–1.97 centimetres (0.68–0.78 in) by 3.60–4.16 centimetres (1.42–1.64 in) in size. The leaf stem is 2.6–3.18 millimetres (0.102–0.125 in) long.

The inflorescence is a distichous raceme measuring 1.51–2.16 centimetres (0.59–0.85 in) long. The flower stems are 0.86–1.21 millimetres (0.034–0.048 in) long. The dorsal sepal is narrowly ovate, 4.26–4.42 millimetres (0.168–0.174 in) long, around 0.97 millimetres (0.038 in) wide, pale yellow, and has a purplish-red centre. The lateral sepals are narrowly ovate, 3.75–4.06 millimetres (0.148–0.160 in) long, 0.72–0.88 millimetres (0.028–0.035 in) wide, and cream. The petals are light yellow. The lip is slightly depressed in the centre, 1.19–1.42 millimetres (0.047–0.056 in) long, 0.39–0.48 millimetres (0.015–0.019 in) wide, cream, and has narrowly oblong blades with rounded ends. The column is yellow.

Lepanthes nidiagongorana is similar to Lepanthes filamentosa.

== Etymology ==
The specific epithet nidiagongorana honours singer-songwriter Nidia Góngora.
