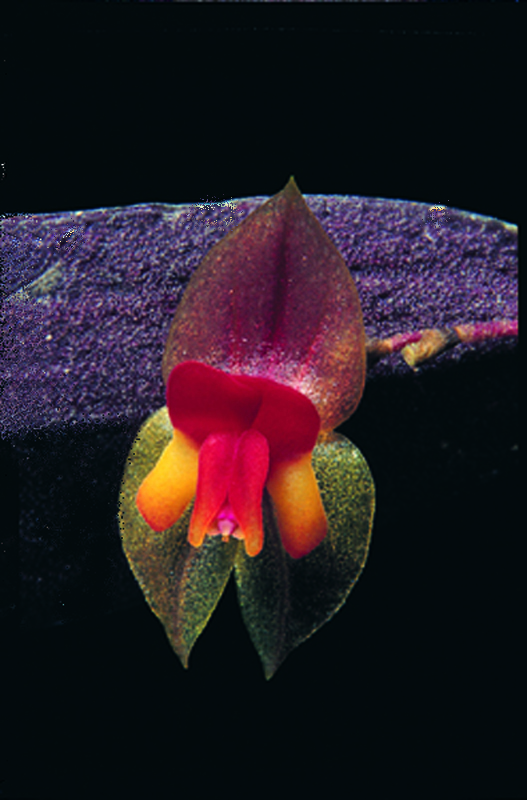

Scientific classification
- Kingdom: Plantae
- Clade: Tracheophytes
- Clade: Angiosperms
- Clade: Monocots
- Order: Asparagales
- Family: Orchidaceae
- Subfamily: Epidendroideae
- Genus: Lepanthes
- Species: L. stenophylla

Binomial name
- Lepanthes stenophylla Schltr.

Synonyms
- Lepanthes inaequalis Schltr.; Lepanthes archilae Luer & Béhar

= Lepanthes stenophylla =

Species of orchid

Lepanthes stenophylla is a species of orchid found from Mexico (Chiapas) to Venezuela.
