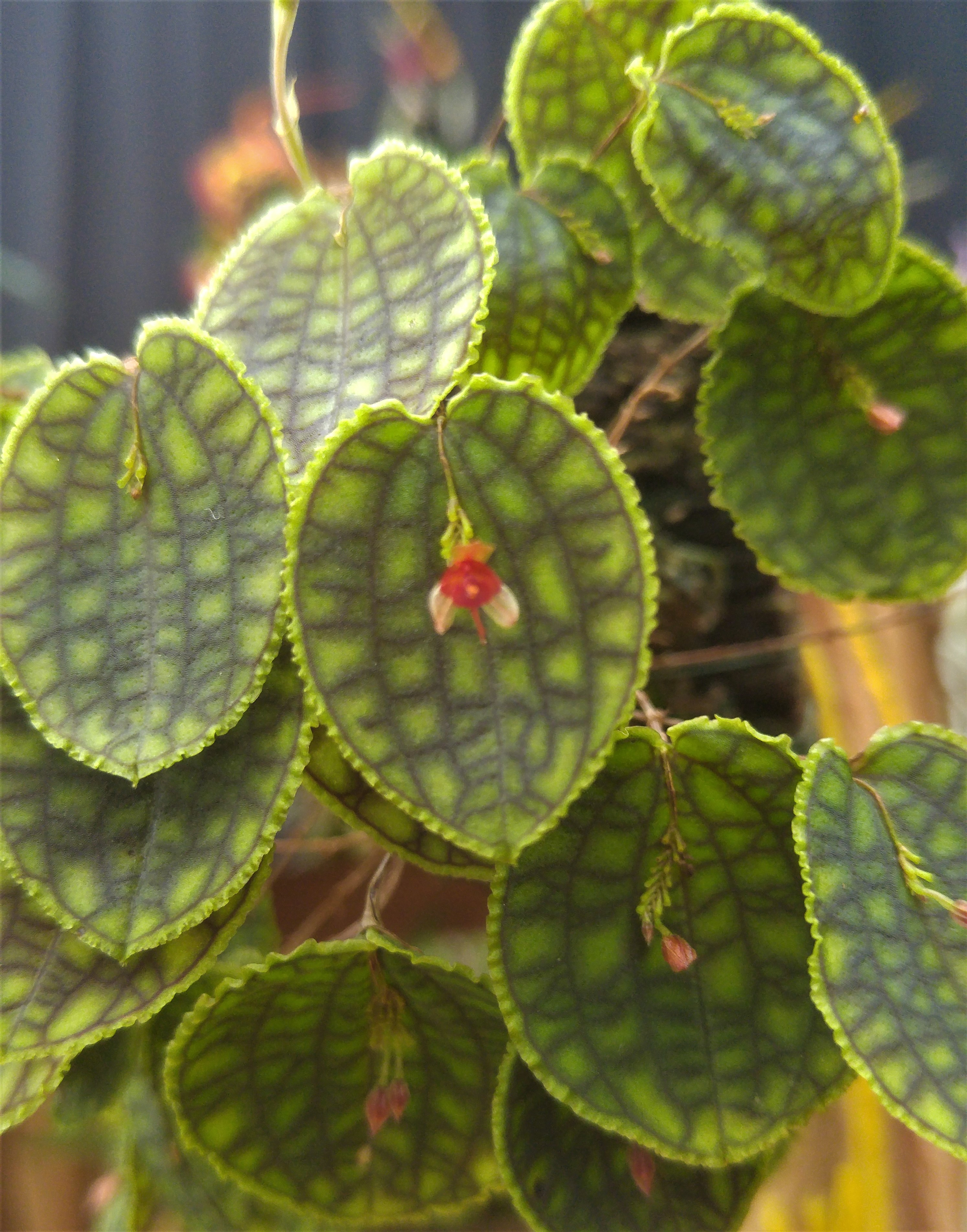

Scientific classification
- Kingdom: Plantae
- Clade: Tracheophytes
- Clade: Angiosperms
- Clade: Monocots
- Order: Asparagales
- Family: Orchidaceae
- Subfamily: Epidendroideae
- Genus: Lepanthes
- Species: L. calodictyon

Binomial name
- Lepanthes calodictyon Hook.

= Lepanthes calodictyon =

Species of orchid

Lepanthes calodictyon is a small epiphytic orchid native to the montane forest of Ecuador and Colombia, commonly found at elevations ranging from 450 to 1,500 metres (1,480 to 4,920 ft). This orchid practices pseudocopulation, with the flower resembling a female insect to the extent of initially fooling entomologists) the flower grows out of the leaf. The leaves have a checkerboard pattern of two shades of green on the upper surface, and red stripes on white underneath.
