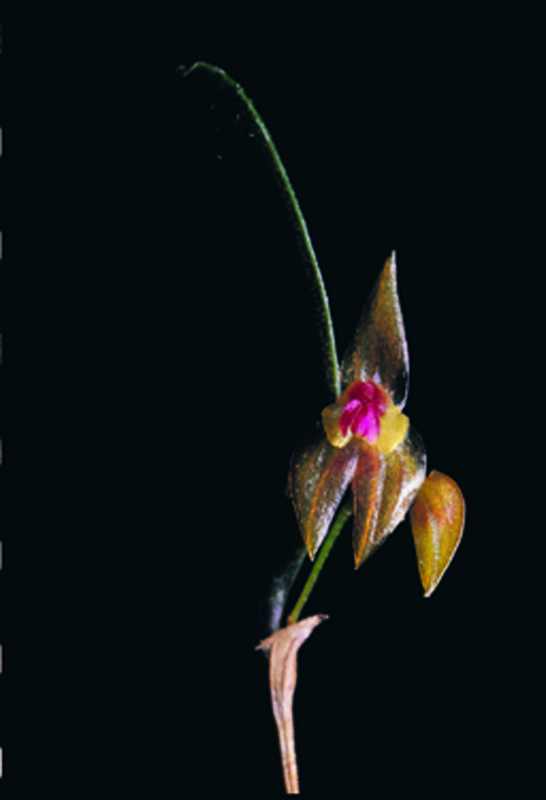

Scientific classification
- Kingdom: Plantae
- Clade: Tracheophytes
- Clade: Angiosperms
- Clade: Monocots
- Order: Asparagales
- Family: Orchidaceae
- Subfamily: Epidendroideae
- Genus: Lepanthes
- Species: L. excedens

Binomial name
- Lepanthes excedens Ames & Correll, Bot. Mus. Leafl., 10: 72, tab. 6, fig. 1-5, 1942

Synonyms
- Lepanthes empis Luer, 1984; Lepanthes camposii Salazar & Soto Arenas, 1996

= Lepanthes excedens =

Species of orchid

Lepanthes excedens is a species of orchid native to Central America.
