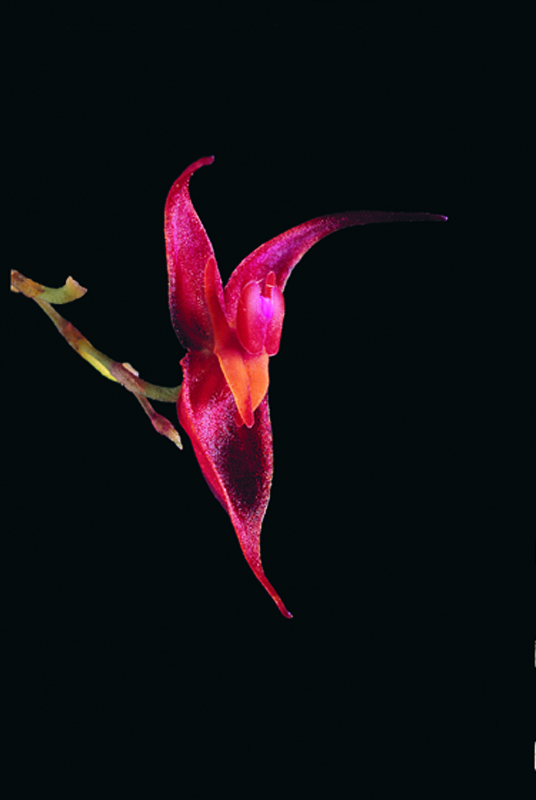

Scientific classification
- Kingdom: Plantae
- Clade: Tracheophytes
- Clade: Angiosperms
- Clade: Monocots
- Order: Asparagales
- Family: Orchidaceae
- Subfamily: Epidendroideae
- Genus: Lepanthes
- Species: L. × stenosepala

Binomial name
- Lepanthes × stenosepala Luer & Béhar

= Lepanthes × stenosepala =

Species of orchid

Lepanthes × stenosepala is a species of orchid native to Central America.

Found in Guatemala, El Salvador and Honduras at elevations around 1600 to 1800 meters as a miniature sized, cool growing epiphyte. This species is a natural hybrid between Lepanthes enca-barcenae and L. tactiquensis and is intermediate in habit and flowers between the two.
