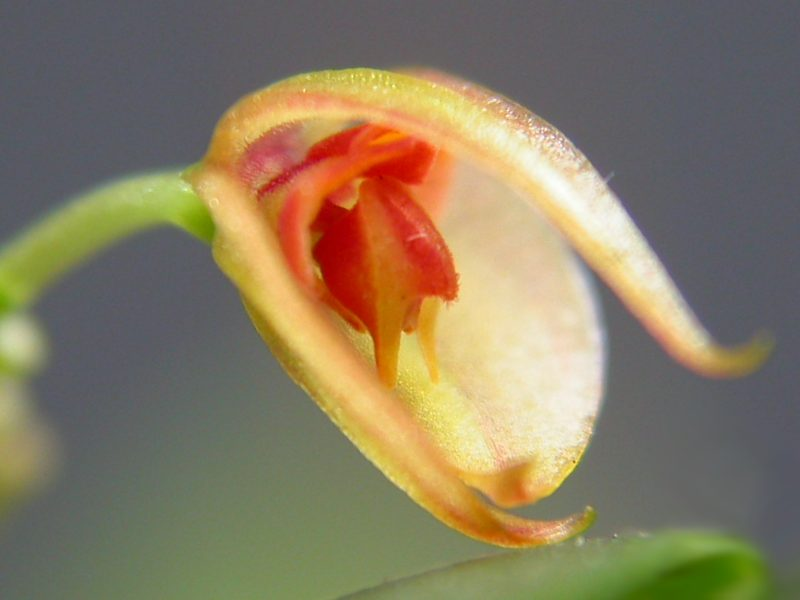

Scientific classification
- Kingdom: Plantae
- Clade: Tracheophytes
- Clade: Angiosperms
- Clade: Monocots
- Order: Asparagales
- Family: Orchidaceae
- Subfamily: Epidendroideae
- Genus: Lepanthes
- Species: L. helicocephala

Binomial name
- Lepanthes helicocephala Rchb.f.

= Lepanthes helicocephala =

Species of orchid

Lepanthes helicocephala is a species of orchid native to the Neotropics.
