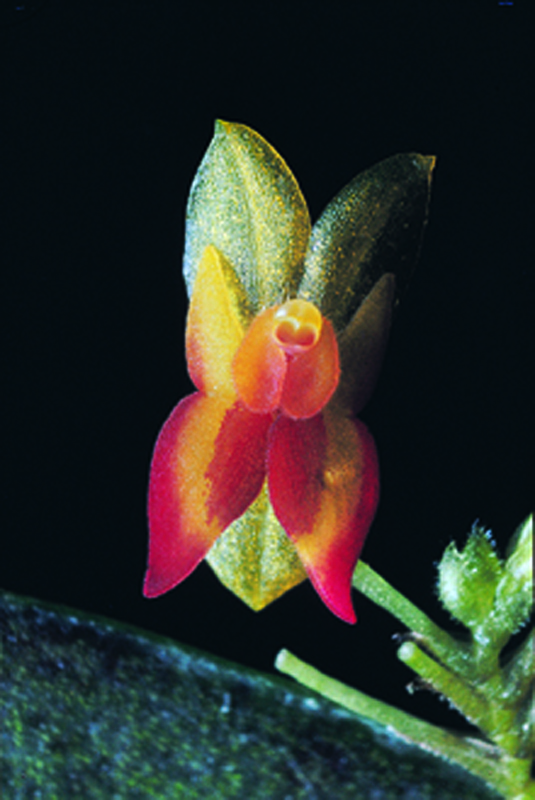

Scientific classification
- Kingdom: Plantae
- Clade: Tracheophytes
- Clade: Angiosperms
- Clade: Monocots
- Order: Asparagales
- Family: Orchidaceae
- Subfamily: Epidendroideae
- Genus: Lepanthes
- Species: L. scopula

Binomial name
- Lepanthes scopula Schltr.

Synonyms
- Lepanthes quetzalensis Luer & Béhar

= Lepanthes scopula =

Species of orchid

Lepanthes scopula is a species of orchid found from Mexico (Oaxaca and Chiapas) to Central America.
