= Lepanthes nasariana =

Scientific classification
- Kingdom: Plantae
- Clade: Tracheophytes
- Clade: Angiosperms
- Clade: Monocots
- Order: Asparagales
- Family: Orchidaceae
- Subfamily: Epidendroideae
- Genus: Lepanthes
- Species: L. nasariana

Binomial name
- Lepanthes nasariana J.S.Moreno & Hazzi

Species of flowering plant

Lepanthes nasariana is a species of flowering plant in the family Orchidaceae. It is an epiphyte with purple leaves, and yellow and reddish flowers. The species is native to Colombia, and was described in 2025.

Lepanthes nasariana is named after the protagonist of the novel Chronicle of a Death Foretold, in reference to its predicted extinction.

== Taxonomy ==
The species was described by Juan Sebastián Moreno and Nicolas A. Hazzi in 2025. It is part of the section Lepanthes and the subsection Breves.

== Distribution ==
Lepanthes nasariana is native to the wet tropical biome of Colombia. Its extent of occurrence is around 27,502 square kilometres (10,619 sq mi).

The species is found in cloud forests and páramos, at elevations of 2,800–3,600 metres (9,200–11,800 ft). It grows on moss-covered branches in shaded areas.

== Description ==
Lepanthes nasariana is an epiphyte. It grows 4.5–5.0 centimetres (1.8–2.0 in) tall. The roots and stems are slender. The stems are 18–23 millimetres (0.71–0.91 in) long.

The leaves are purple, leathery, oblong-lanceolate, 15.7–20.3 millimetres (0.62–0.80 in) long, and 3.3–4.7 millimetres (0.13–0.19 in) long. The leaf stem is 2–3 millimetres (0.079–0.118 in) long.

The inflorescence is a raceme with twelve to twenty flowers, that grows up to 18 millimetres (0.71 in) long. The flower stems are up to 1 millimetre (0.039 in) long. The dorsal sepals are 2.6–2.7 millimetres (0.10–0.11 in) long, 1.4–1.5 millimetres (0.055–0.059 in) wide, ovate, dark red, and have yellow edges. The lateral sepals are ovate, 2.5–2.6 millimetres (0.098–0.102 in) long, 0.9–1.0 millimetre (0.035–0.039 in) wide, yellow, and reddish-purple around the midvein. The petals are 0.5–0.6 millimetres (0.020–0.024 in) long, 1.4–1.6 millimetres (0.055–0.063 in) wide, sickle-shaped, and have an orange-red upper lobe and a yellow lower lobe. The lip is 0.88–0.90 millimetres (0.035–0.035 in) long, 0.24–0.31 millimetres (0.0094–0.0122 in) wide, narrowly ovate, and crimson with a yellow apex. The column is 0.9–1.0 millimetre (0.035–0.039 in) long, and crimson and white in colour.

Lepanthes nasariana is most similar to Lepanthes mefueensis.

== Etymology ==
The specific epithet nasariana refers to Santiago Nasar, protagonist of Colombian author Gabriel García Márquez's novel Chronicle of a Death Foretold. In the novel, Nasar's impending death is known to everyone but himself. This inspired the concept of the "Nasar effect", where a newly described species is already at high risk of extinction. The describing authors expect Lepanthes nasariana to become extinct due to climate change.
