= Lepanthes helleri =

Scientific classification
- Kingdom: Plantae
- Clade: Tracheophytes
- Clade: Angiosperms
- Clade: Monocots
- Order: Asparagales
- Family: Orchidaceae
- Subfamily: Epidendroideae
- Genus: Lepanthes
- Species: L. helleri

Binomial name
- Lepanthes helleri A.D.Hawkes

Species of orchid

Lepanthes helleri is a miniature orchid (family Orchidaceae) endemic to the cloud forests of Costa Rica in which the leaf is curled into a tube, with the solitary flower emerging directly from the leaf, facing the inside of the tube.
