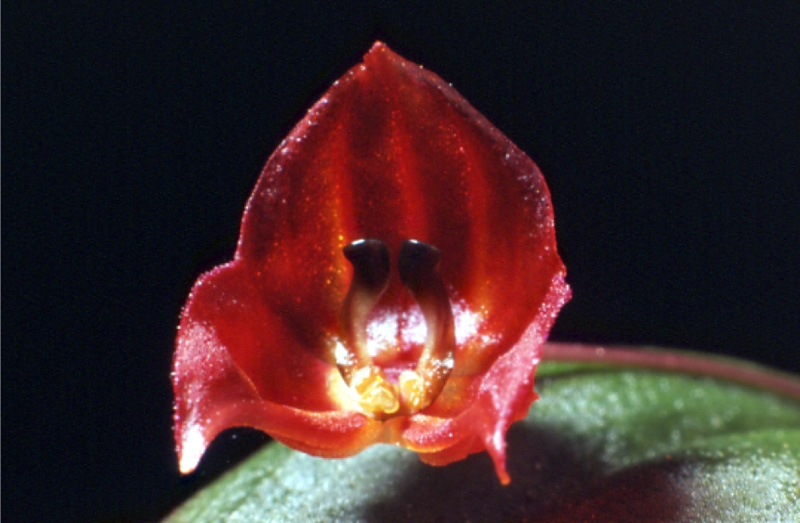

Scientific classification
- Kingdom: Plantae
- Clade: Tracheophytes
- Clade: Angiosperms
- Clade: Monocots
- Order: Asparagales
- Family: Orchidaceae
- Subfamily: Epidendroideae
- Genus: Lepanthes
- Species: L. lucifer

Binomial name
- Lepanthes lucifer Luer & Hirtz

= Lepanthes lucifer =

Species of orchid

Lepanthes lucifer is a species of orchid endemic to Ecuador.
