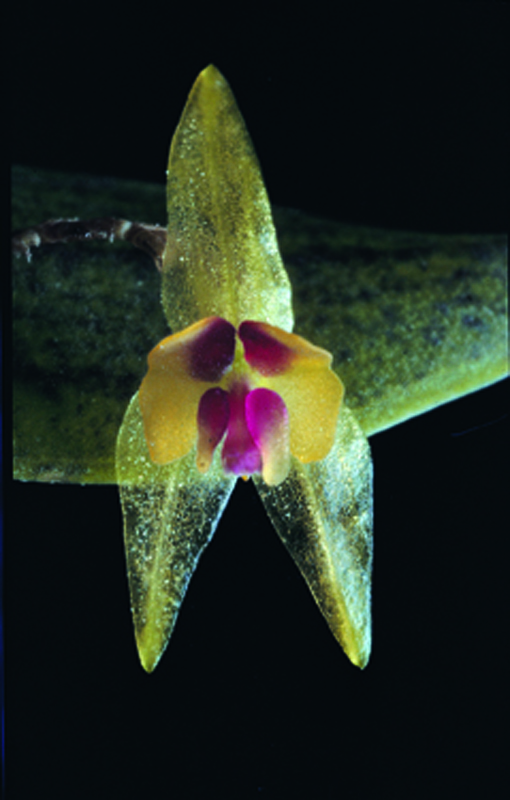

Scientific classification
- Kingdom: Plantae
- Clade: Tracheophytes
- Clade: Angiosperms
- Clade: Monocots
- Order: Asparagales
- Family: Orchidaceae
- Subfamily: Epidendroideae
- Genus: Lepanthes
- Species: L. acuminata

Binomial name
- Lepanthes acuminata Schltr.

= Lepanthes acuminata =

Species of orchid

Lepanthes acuminata is a species of orchid that occurs from Mexico to northern Venezuela.
