= Lepanthes oscarrodrigoi =

Scientific classification
- Kingdom: Plantae
- Clade: Tracheophytes
- Clade: Angiosperms
- Clade: Monocots
- Order: Asparagales
- Family: Orchidaceae
- Subfamily: Epidendroideae
- Genus: Lepanthes
- Species: L. oscarrodrigoi

Binomial name
- Lepanthes oscarrodrigoi Archila & Chiron

Species of orchid

Lepanthes oscarrodrigoi is an orchid species from Guatemala. It is the smallest known orchid. The stem is 2.5 to 3 mm long and bears a single leaf, 5 mm long and 5.5 mm wide.
