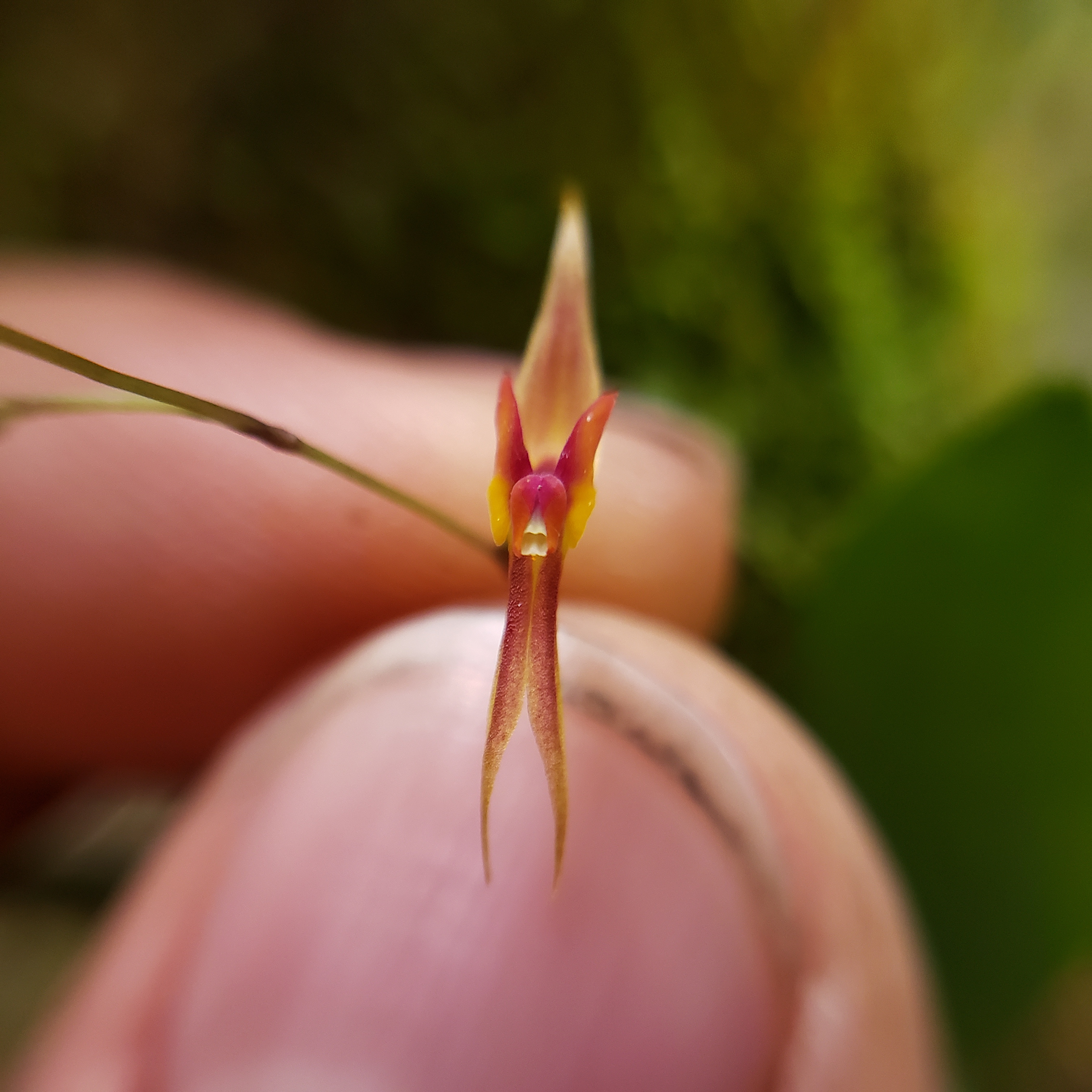
- Lepanthes kokonuko flower

Scientific classification
- Kingdom: Plantae
- Clade: Tracheophytes
- Clade: Angiosperms
- Clade: Monocots
- Order: Asparagales
- Family: Orchidaceae
- Subfamily: Epidendroideae
- Genus: Lepanthes
- Species: L. kokonuko

Binomial name
- Lepanthes kokonuko J.S. Moreno & Pisso-Florez

= Lepanthes kokonuko =

Species of orchid

Lepanthes kokonuko is a species of orchid from southern Colombia. L. kokonuko can be easily recognized by its caespitose medium-sized plants, elliptical coriaceous leaves, long loosely, flexuous and distichous inflorescences; strongly revolute lateral sepals, transversely bilobed petals with the upper lobe lanceolate (hornlike), and a bilaminate lip with the blades ovoid–lanceolate with a bipartite appendix.

== Description ==
The plant is epiphytic, medium in size, caespitose, erect to suberect, up to 11.5 cm tall. Roots slender, flexuous, filiform, ca. 1 mm in diameter. Ramicauls slender, erect to suberect, stout, up to 8 cm long, enclosed by 2–6 lepanthiform sheaths, furrowed, microscopically ciliate along the margins, with a dilated ostia, acuminate. Leaves erect, coriaceous, elliptical, acute, the apex emarginate with an abaxial apiculum in the middle, 1.5–3.5 × 1.0–1.5 cm, the base cuneate contracted into a petiole 4–6 mm long. Inflorescence 2–3 congested, successively few-flowered racemes up to 7 cm long including the peduncle, loose, distichous, flexuous positioned below the leaf by a filiform peduncle up to 2.5 cm long; floral bract deltoid, acute, 1.5–3.6 mm long; pedicel terete, persistent, 3–4 mm long. Ovary with 3 fringed wings, costate, 1.0–1.3 mm long. Flowers with sepals light yellow, the lateral medially suffused with burgundy, petals yellow with the upper lobes suffused with burgundy towards the base and orange along the margins, lip saffron marginally suffused with orange, the base of the blades crimson, column white, anther cap pink. Sepals similar in shape and size, ovate, attenuate, carinate abaxially along the veins. Dorsal sepal 3-veined, slightly concave, 1.0– 1.3 × 0.3 cm, connate to the lateral sepals for 2 mm. Lateral sepals 2-veined, strongly revolute in natural position, 1.0 × 0.4 cm, connate for 6 mm. Petals microscopically pubescent, transversely bilobed, with a small, marginal angle between the lobes, 1.0 × 4.5– 5.0 mm, the upper lobe narrowly triangular, acute, recurved, 3.0–3.5 mm long, the lower lobe ovate to triangular, slightly falcate, acute, with a retuse inner margin, 1.0–1.5 mm long. Lip bilaminate, the blades ovate-lanceolate with rounded ends, microscopically pubescent, 2 × 1 mm long, the connectives cuneate, the body, connate to the base of the column, the sinus broad with a bipartite appendix composed of two linear, clavate processes. Column terete, 1.5 mm long, the anther dorsal and the stigma apical. Anther cap orbicular to cordate, cucullate, 0.25 mm wide. Pollinia yellow, two, pyriform, 0.3 mm long.

== Distribution and ecology ==
Lepanthes kokonuko is found in the Colombian Massif of the western slope in Central Andes at Piedra León village in the municipality of Sotará and Rio Negro village in the municipality of Puracé, both in the Cauca department, between 3172 and 3235 m in elevation. It has been found growing as an epiphyte next to Lepanthes cyrtostele Luer & Hirtz, Lepanthes mucronata Lindl., and Lepanthes arbuscula Luer & R. Escobar, in a high Andean forest with arboreal species like Clusia multiflora Kunth and Weinmannia pubescens Kunth. The species has been observed flowering in December to February, typically dry seasons in that region.

== Taxonomy ==
Lepanthes kokonuko was described by J. S. Moreno and G. A. Pizzo-Florez, and first published in Lankesteriana 229–239. 2020.

Etymology

see: Lepanthes

kokonuko: epithet The name Kokonuko, which means “Mountain people”, refers to the Kokonukos indigenous community that inhabit the area where the species was found. Also, in reference to the Kokonukos volcanic chain, a sacred place protected by the Puracé National Natural Park and its local communities.
