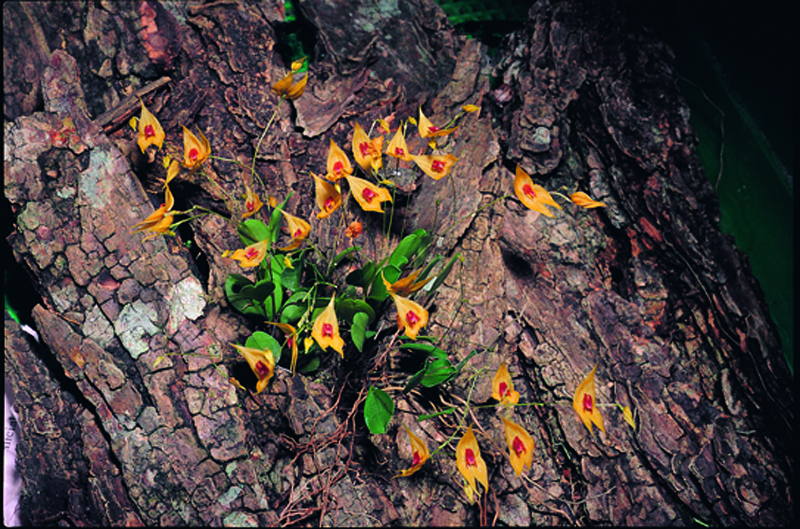

Scientific classification
- Kingdom: Plantae
- Clade: Tracheophytes
- Clade: Angiosperms
- Clade: Monocots
- Order: Asparagales
- Family: Orchidaceae
- Subfamily: Epidendroideae
- Genus: Lepanthes
- Species: L. guatemalensis

Binomial name
- Lepanthes guatemalensis Schltr.

Synonyms
- Lepanthes tuerckheimii Schltr.; Lepanthes gibberosa Ames

= Lepanthes guatemalensis =

Species of orchid

Lepanthes guatemalensis is a species of orchid found from Mexico (Chiapas) to El Salvador.
