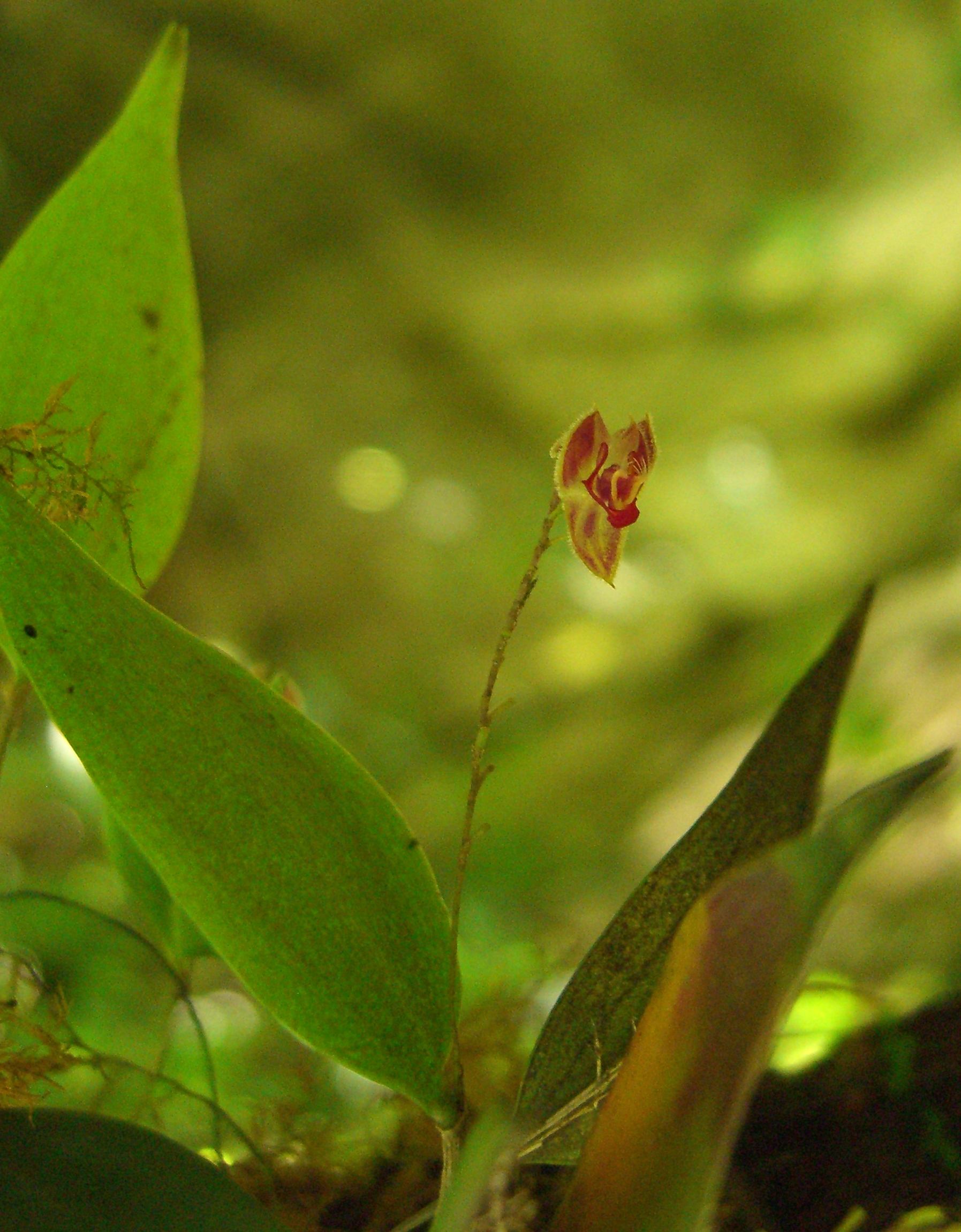

Scientific classification
- Kingdom: Plantae
- Clade: Tracheophytes
- Clade: Angiosperms
- Clade: Monocots
- Order: Asparagales
- Family: Orchidaceae
- Subfamily: Epidendroideae
- Genus: Lepanthes
- Species: L. pteropogon

Binomial name
- Lepanthes pteropogon Rchb.f.

Synonyms
- Lepanthes pollex Luer

= Lepanthes pteropogon =

Species of orchid

Lepanthes pteropogon is a species of orchid found from Colombia to El Salvador.
