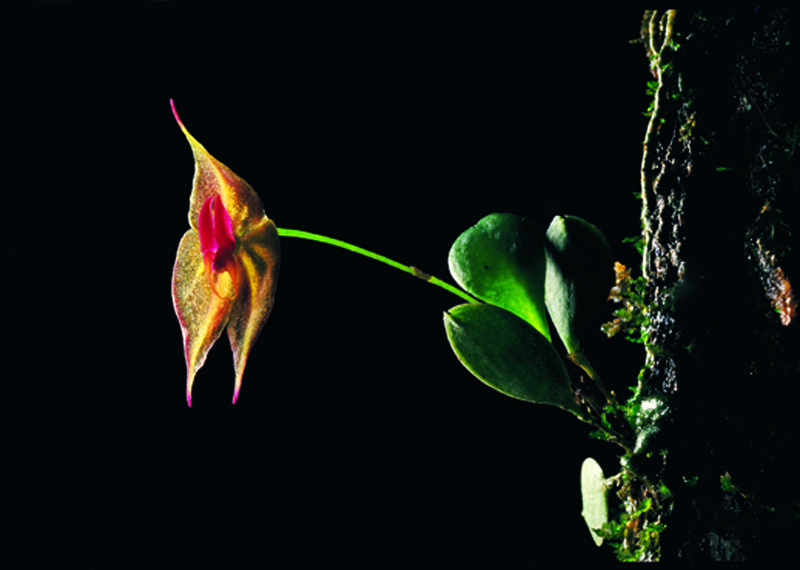

Scientific classification
- Kingdom: Plantae
- Clade: Tracheophytes
- Clade: Angiosperms
- Clade: Monocots
- Order: Asparagales
- Family: Orchidaceae
- Subfamily: Epidendroideae
- Genus: Lepanthes
- Species: L. johnsonii

Binomial name
- Lepanthes johnsonii Ames

= Lepanthes johnsonii =

Species of orchid

Lepanthes johnsonii is a species of orchid found from Mexico (Chiapas) to Guatemala. It has a subspecies, L. johnsonii subsp. costaricensis.
