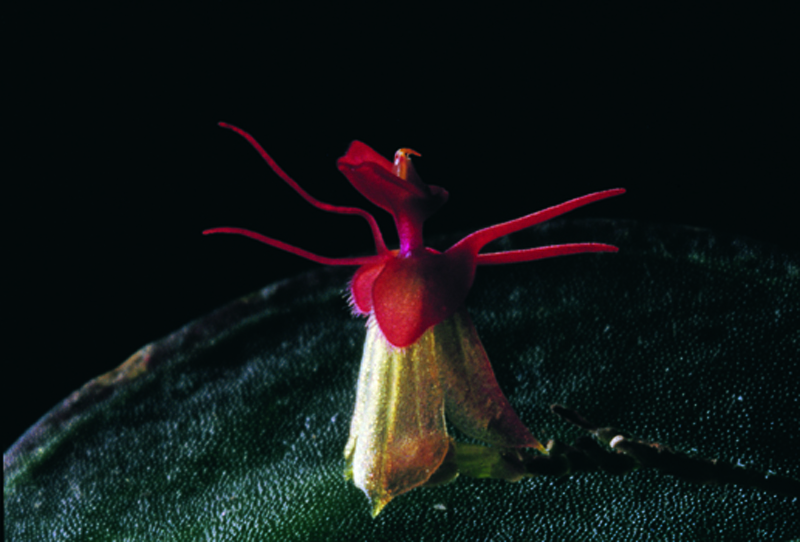

Scientific classification
- Kingdom: Plantae
- Clade: Embryophytes
- Clade: Tracheophytes
- Clade: Angiosperms
- Clade: Monocots
- Order: Asparagales
- Family: Orchidaceae
- Subfamily: Epidendroideae
- Genus: Lepanthes
- Species: L. pantomima

Binomial name
- Lepanthes pantomima Luer & Dressler

Synonyms
- Lepanthes arachnion Luer & Dressler

= Lepanthes pantomima =

Species of orchid

Lepanthes pantomima, synonym Lepanthes arachnion, is a species of orchid that occurs from Mexico (Chiapas) to Central America.
