= Lepanthes papillipetala =

Scientific classification
- Kingdom: Plantae
- Clade: Tracheophytes
- Clade: Angiosperms
- Clade: Monocots
- Order: Asparagales
- Family: Orchidaceae
- Subfamily: Epidendroideae
- Genus: Lepanthes
- Species: L. papillipetala

Binomial name
- Lepanthes papillipetala Dressler

Species of orchid

Lepanthes papillipetala is a species of orchid found from Mexico (Chiapas) to El Salvador.
