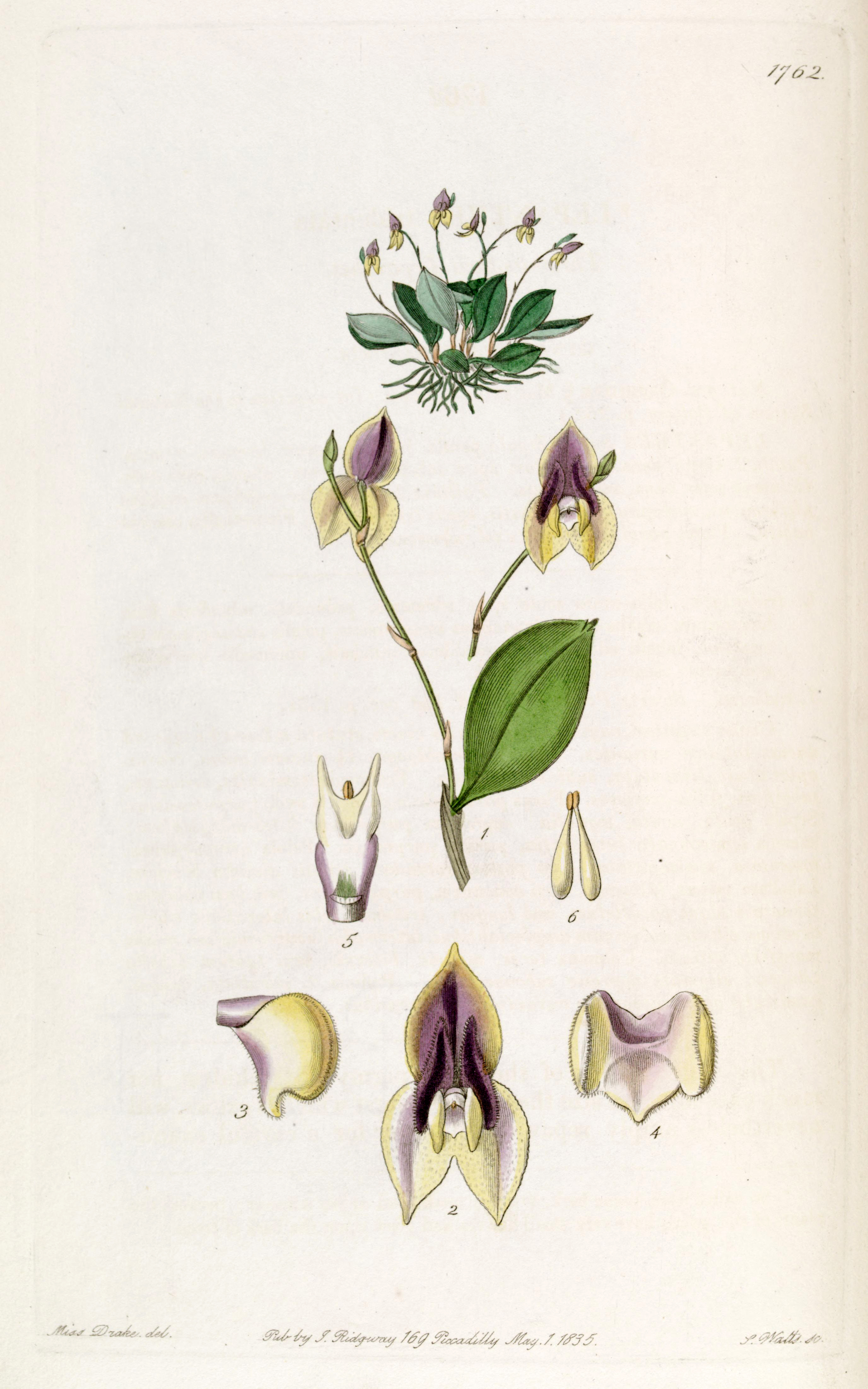

Conservation status
- Endangered (IUCN 3.1)

Scientific classification
- Kingdom: Plantae
- Clade: Tracheophytes
- Clade: Angiosperms
- Clade: Monocots
- Order: Asparagales
- Family: Orchidaceae
- Subfamily: Epidendroideae
- Genus: Lepanthes
- Species: L. tridentata

Binomial name
- Lepanthes tridentata (Sw.) Sw.

Synonyms
- Epidendrum tridentatum Sw. (basionym)

= Lepanthes tridentata =

Species of orchid

Lepanthes tridentata is a species of orchid native to Central America.
