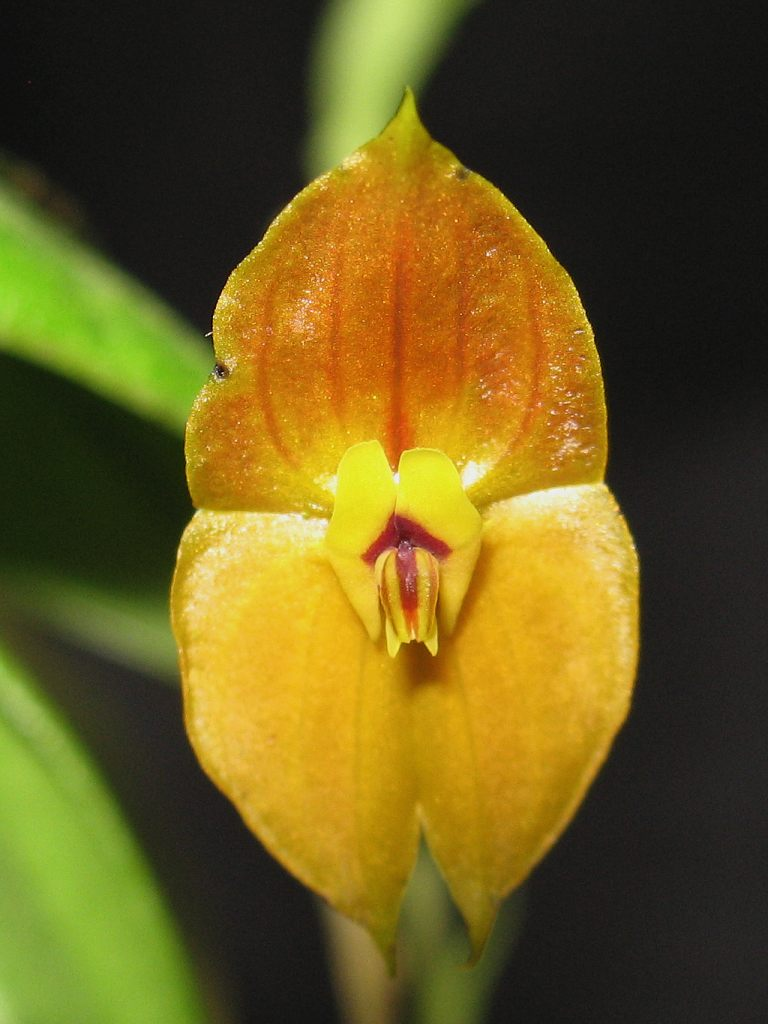

Scientific classification
- Kingdom: Plantae
- Clade: Tracheophytes
- Clade: Angiosperms
- Clade: Monocots
- Order: Asparagales
- Family: Orchidaceae
- Subfamily: Epidendroideae
- Genus: Lepanthes
- Species: L. ophelma

Binomial name
- Lepanthes ophelma Luer & R. Escobar

= Lepanthes ophelma =

Species of orchid

Lepanthes ophelma is a species of orchid endemic to Colombia.
