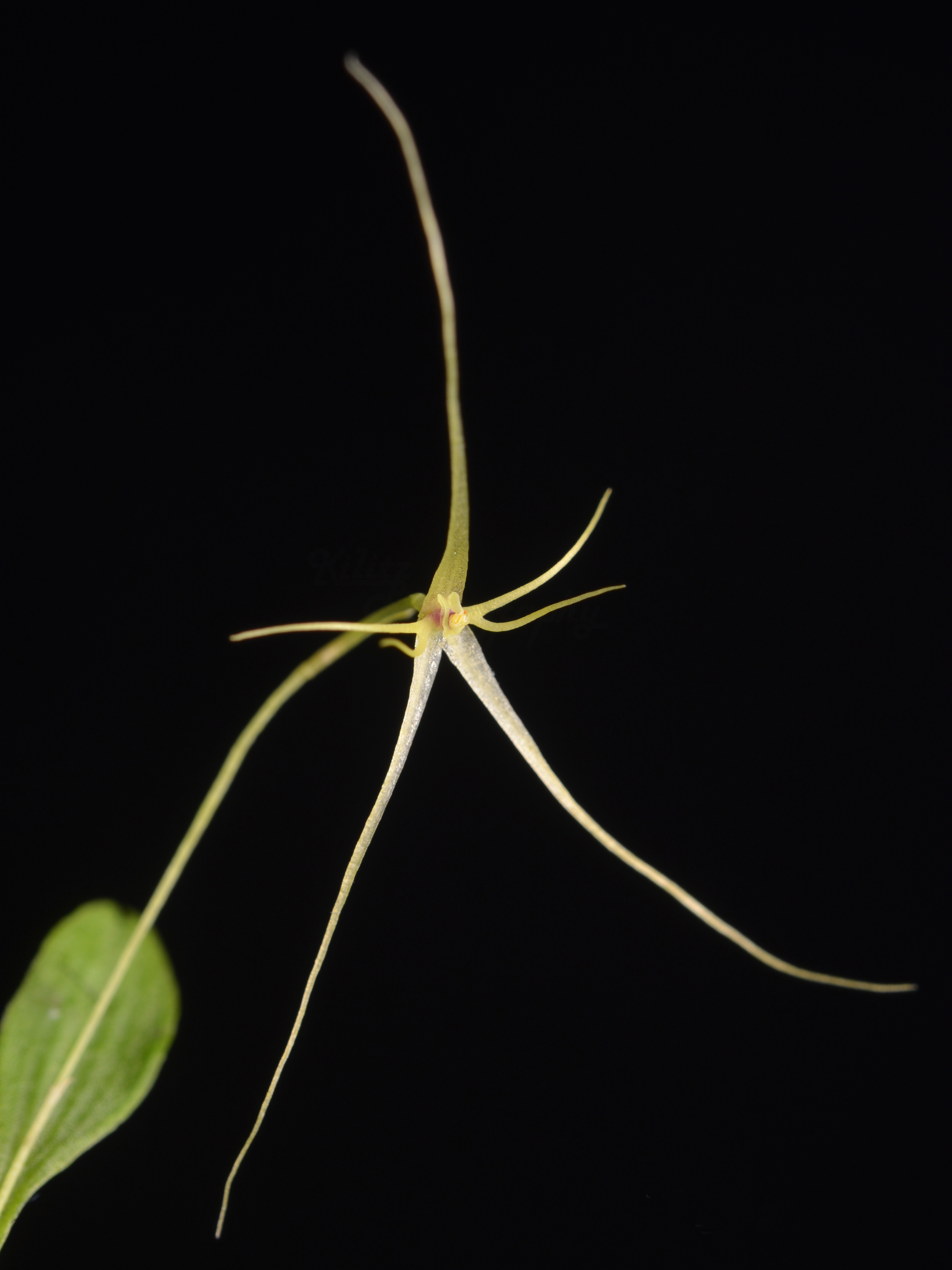

Scientific classification
- Kingdom: Plantae
- Clade: Tracheophytes
- Clade: Angiosperms
- Clade: Monocots
- Order: Asparagales
- Family: Orchidaceae
- Subfamily: Epidendroideae
- Genus: Lepanthes
- Species: L. filamentosa

Binomial name
- Lepanthes filamentosa Luer & Hirtz, 1993

= Lepanthes filamentosa =

Species of orchid

Lepanthes filamentosa is a species of orchid native to Colombia and Ecuador.
