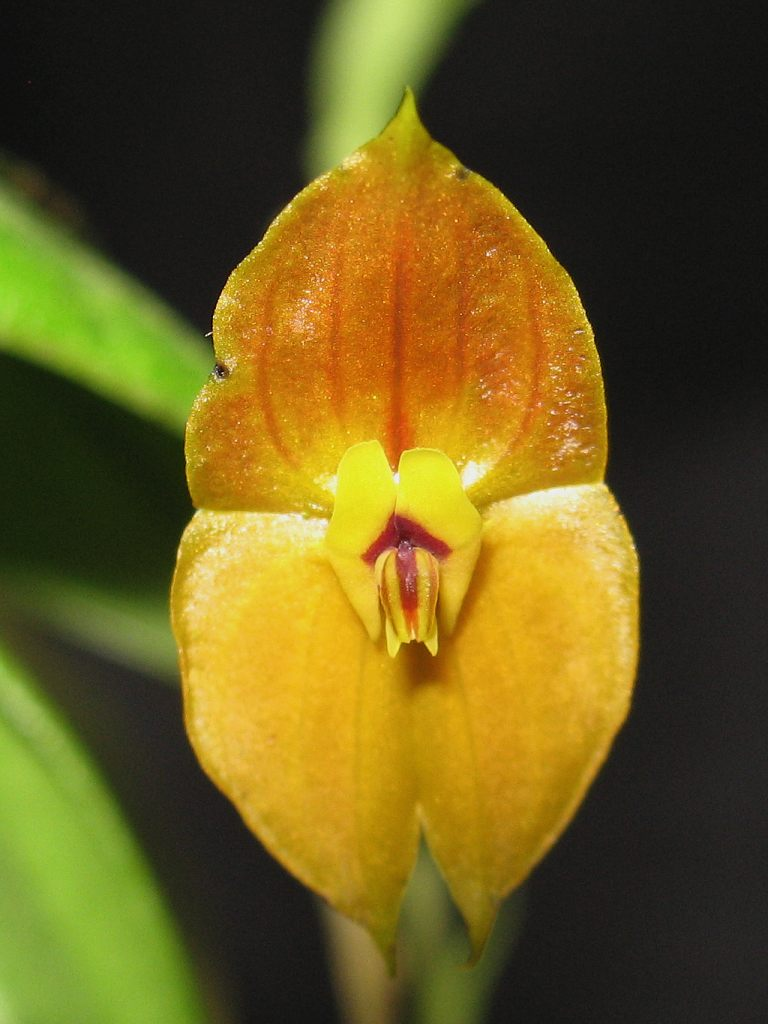
- Lepanthes ophelma

Scientific classification
- Kingdom: Plantae
- Clade: Tracheophytes
- Clade: Angiosperms
- Clade: Monocots
- Order: Asparagales
- Family: Orchidaceae
- Subfamily: Epidendroideae
- Tribe: Epidendreae
- Subtribe: Pleurothallidinae
- Genus: Lepanthes; Sw.

Species
- 800–1000

Synonyms
- Brachycladium (Luer) Luer 2005, illegitimate homonym of 1838 name; Neooreophilus Archila; Oreophilus W.E.Higgins & Archila; Penducella Luer & Thoerle

= Lepanthes =

Genus of orchids

Lepanthes (from Greek "scaled-flower") is a large genus of orchids with about 800–1000 species, distributed in the Antilles and from Mexico through Bolivia (with very few species in Brazil). The genus is abbreviated in horticultural trade as Lths. Almost all the species in the genus are small and live in cloud forests. Babyboot orchid is a common name.

== See also ==
- Draconanthes
- List of Lepanthes species
- List of the largest genera of flowering plants
