= Tuberous begonia =

Group of plant cultivars

Tuberous Begonia
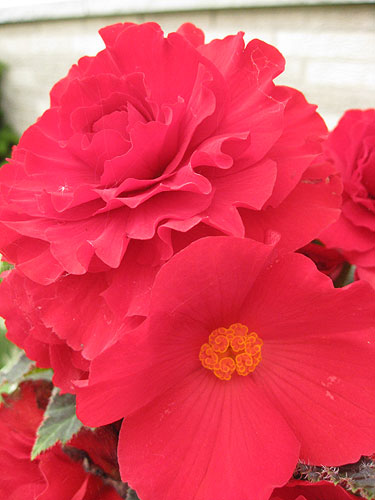
- Male and female flowers of Begonia × tuberhybrida
- Genus: Begonia

Tuberous is an informal classification of Begonias named for the tubers that lie dormant after the plants dies back in the fall or winter, from which the plant regrows in the spring or fall. This type of begonia is usually grown for the flowers they produce, sometimes regarded as some of the most spectacular of the genus. They can be as small as half an inch to as big around as dinner plates. They come in all shades but blue, and some have different colored edges, or are scented. They vary in growth habit, some kinds trailing with pendulant flowers, others with sturdy, upright stalks.

Tuberous begonias were one of the first types of begonias ever to be hybridized. One of the first hybrids produced was B. x sedenii in 1870, a cross between B. boliviensis, collected by botanist Richard Pearce, and a species from the Andes. Another species from Peru, B. davisii (named after Walter Davis), was also used in early breeding.

== Types ==
The classification of begonias is not based on formal taxonomic groupings or phylogeny, but can still be useful for grouping species with similar characteristics. Brad Thompson lists five subdivisions in the group in his book Brad's Begonia World.

=== Species ===
There are a few dozen (non-hybrid) species of tuberous begonias, including Begonia grandis, Begonia boliviensis, Begonia sutherlandii, Begonia davisii, Begonia pearcei, Begonia socotrana and Begonia veitchii. These can be tender, and somewhat difficult to grow.

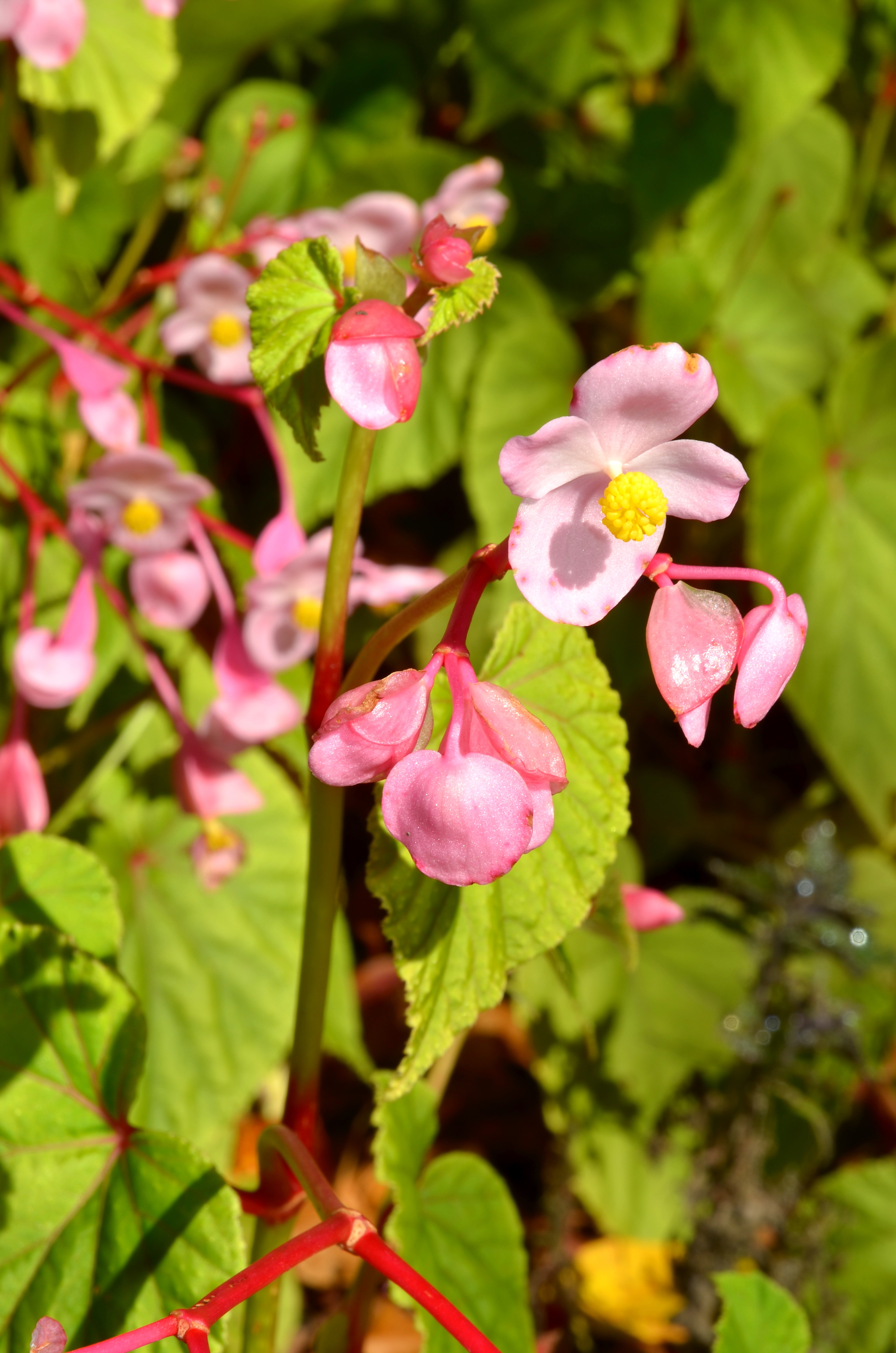
Begonia grandis

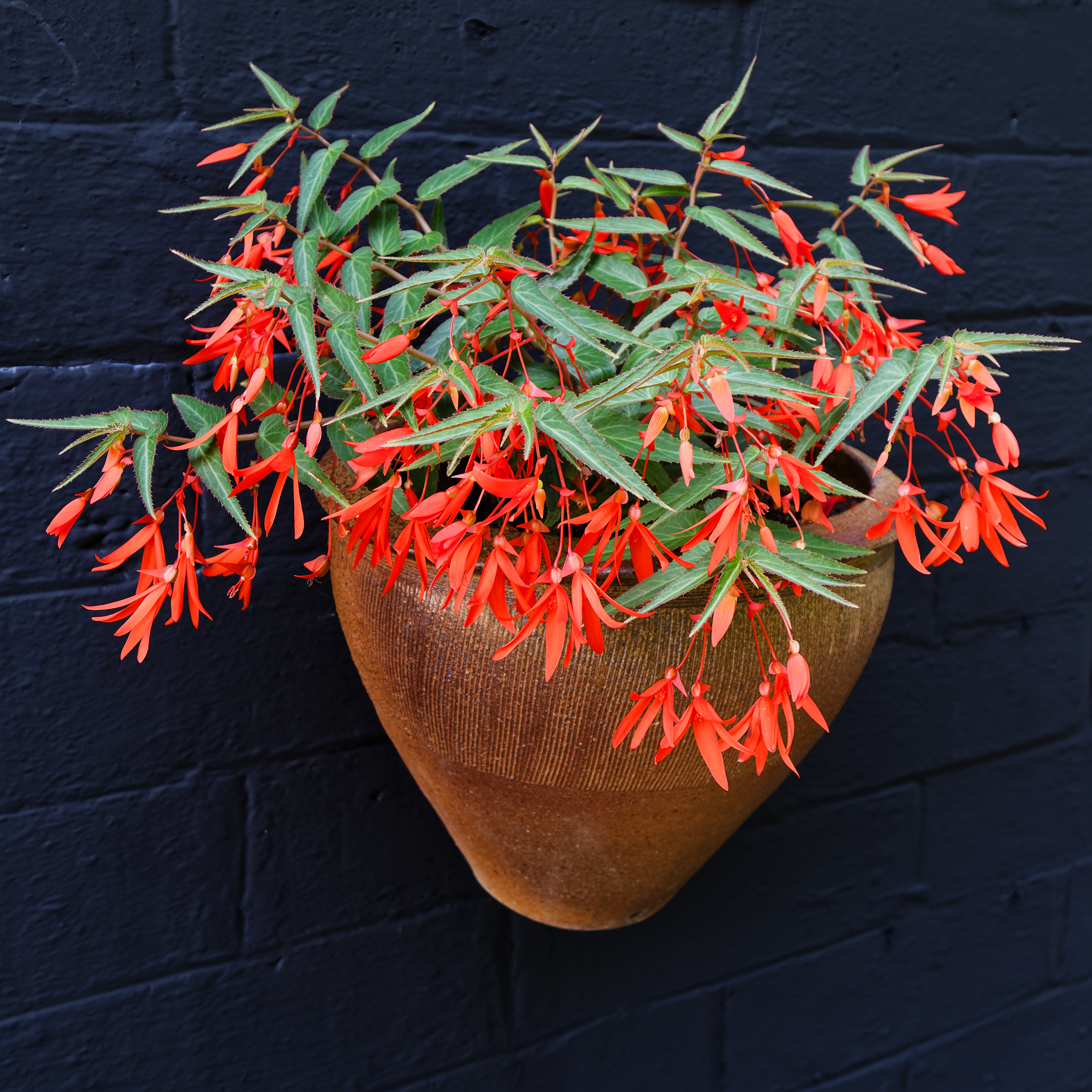
Begonia boliviensis

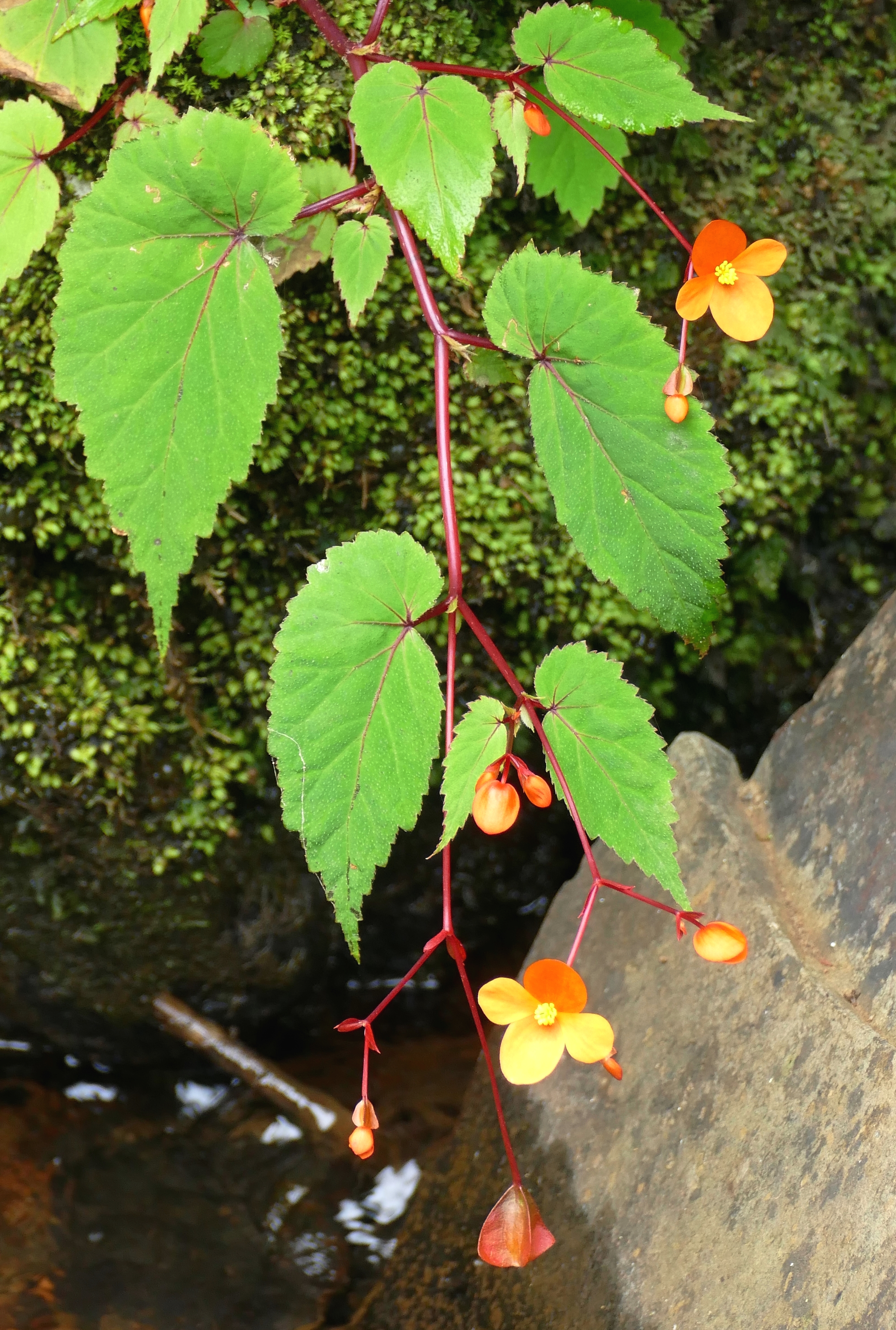
Begonia sutherlandii

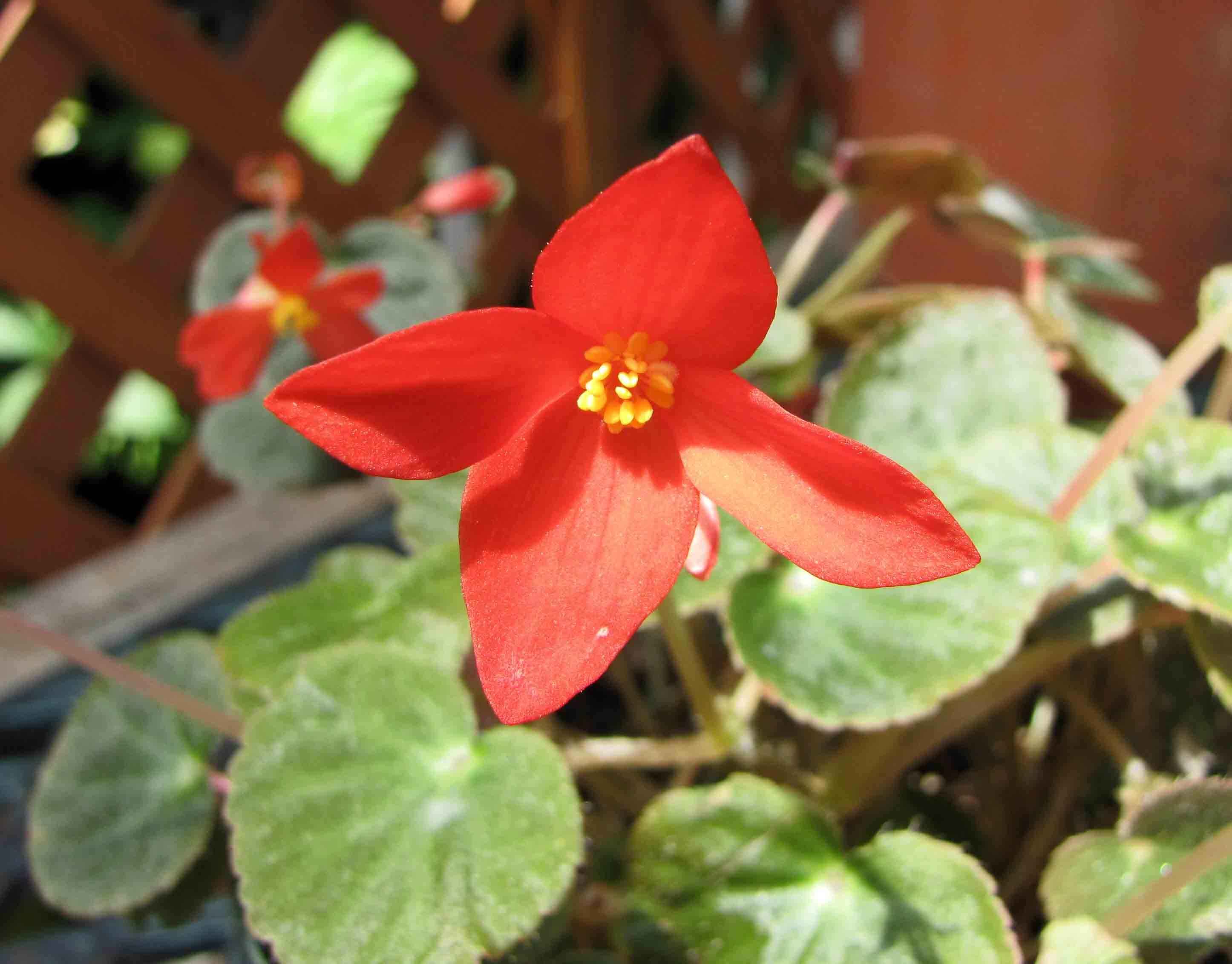
Begonia davisii

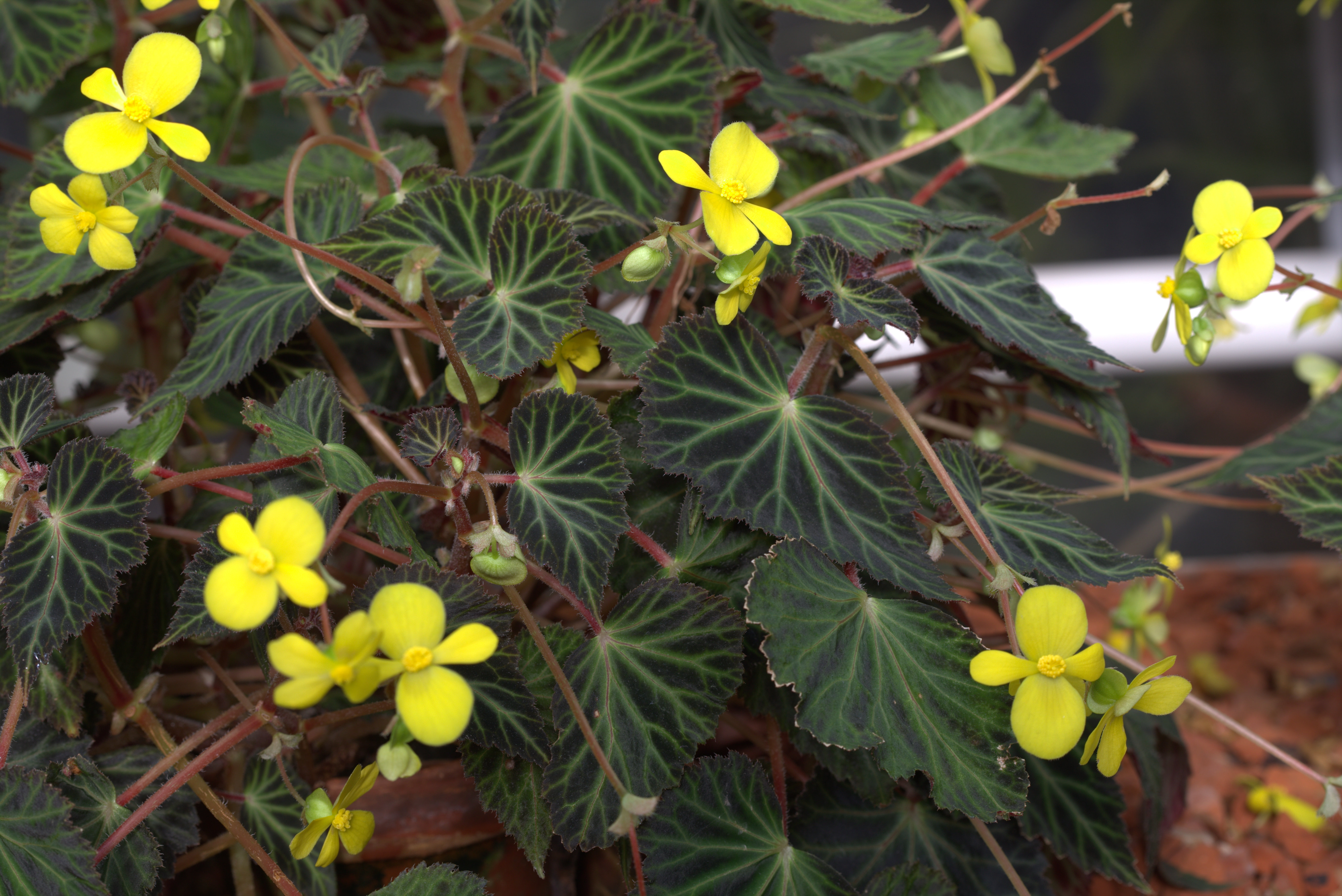
Begonia pearcei

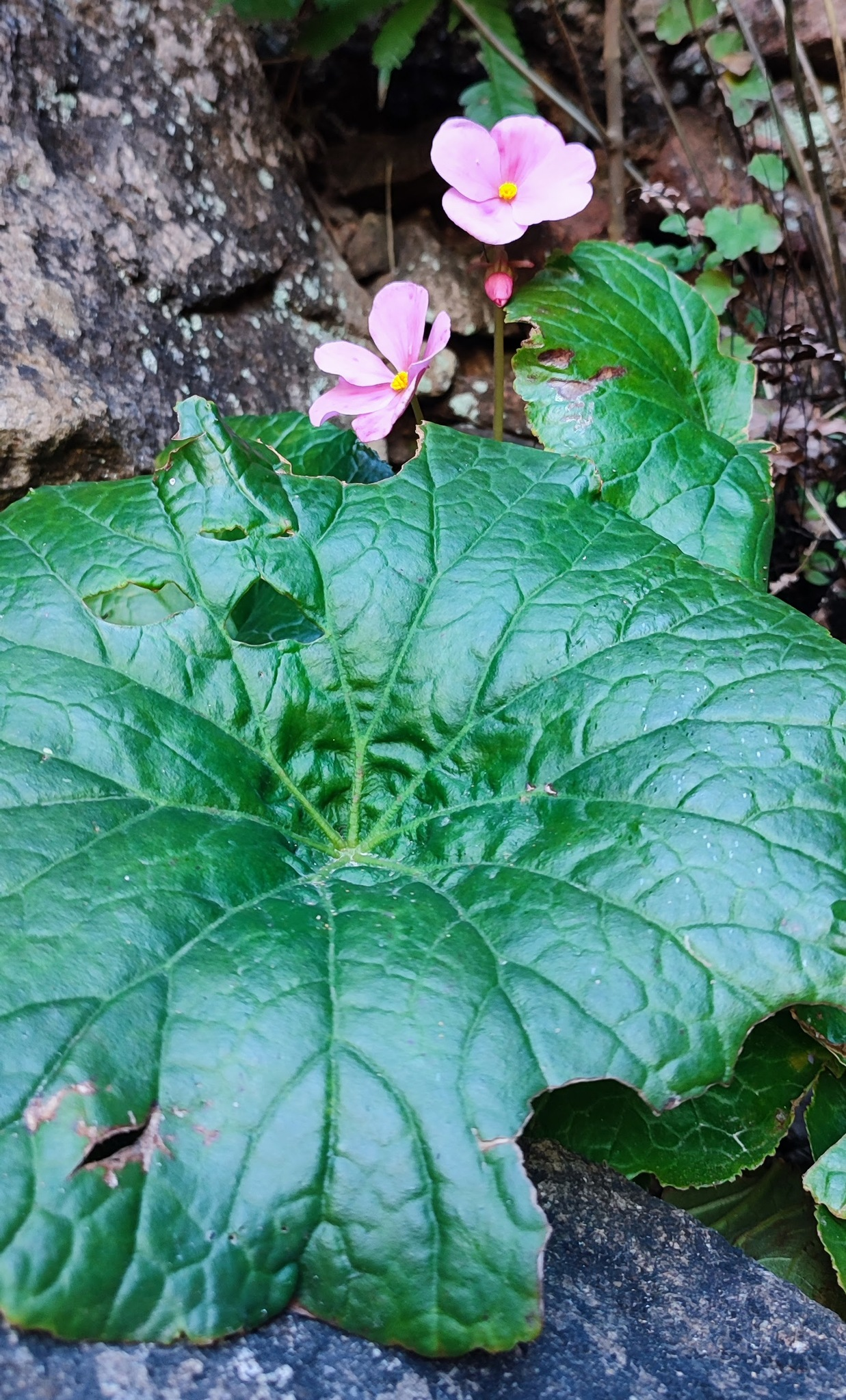
Begonia socotrana

=== Tuberhybrida ===
Begonia × tuberhybrida is one of the most popular types of begonia grown worldwide. They are the complex result of decades of hybridizing for specific species traits, such as flowers and cold-hardiness. They are created primarily from high altitude Latin-American species. All tuberhybrida go dormant for the winter, and upright varieties benefit from staking to support the flowers.

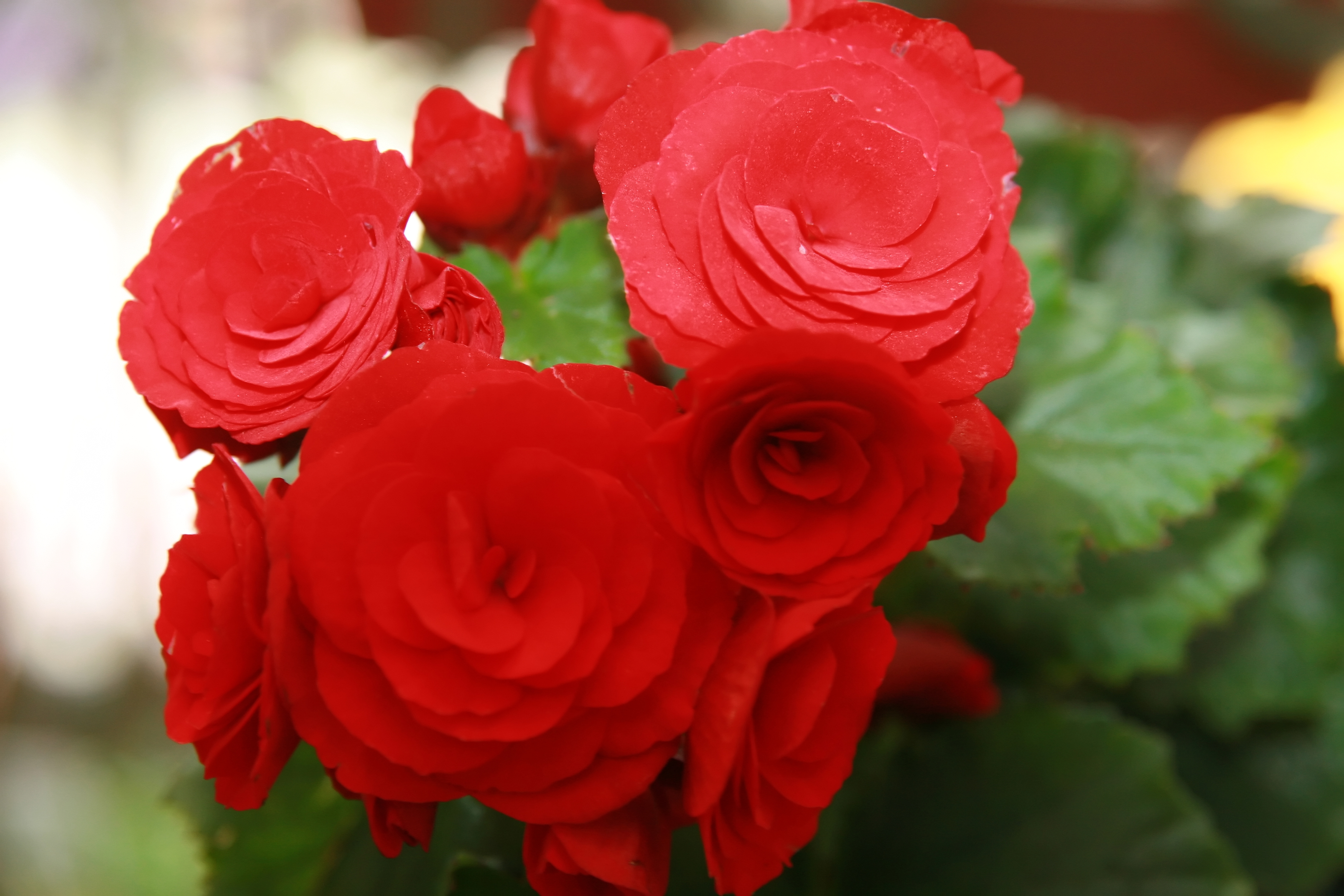
Rieger begonias

=== Semi-Tuberous (Caudex Forming) ===
Also called Thick-Stemmed, and caudiciform would also be an apt designation. Instead of tubers, these plants grow a large caudex which store water and energy. If that plant is stressed, it might die back almost completely to the caudex. If the caudex has not rotted from too much water, it can grow back once conditions improve. The stems are stout and usually unbranched, and lower leaves drop as the stem grows. Nearly all of the begonias in this group are variations or hybrids of Begonia dregei. Caudiciform begonias do well in clay or shallow bonsai pots to avoid waterlogging and highlight the natural tree-like growth of the plant.

=== Hiemalis ===
While these types sometimes have tuberous parentage and/or tuberous qualities(such as a double flower), many of them lack actual tubers. They may tuberous x rhizomatous hybrids, for example, that look much like a tuberous begonia, but grow year-round. Rieger begonias is the most common type.

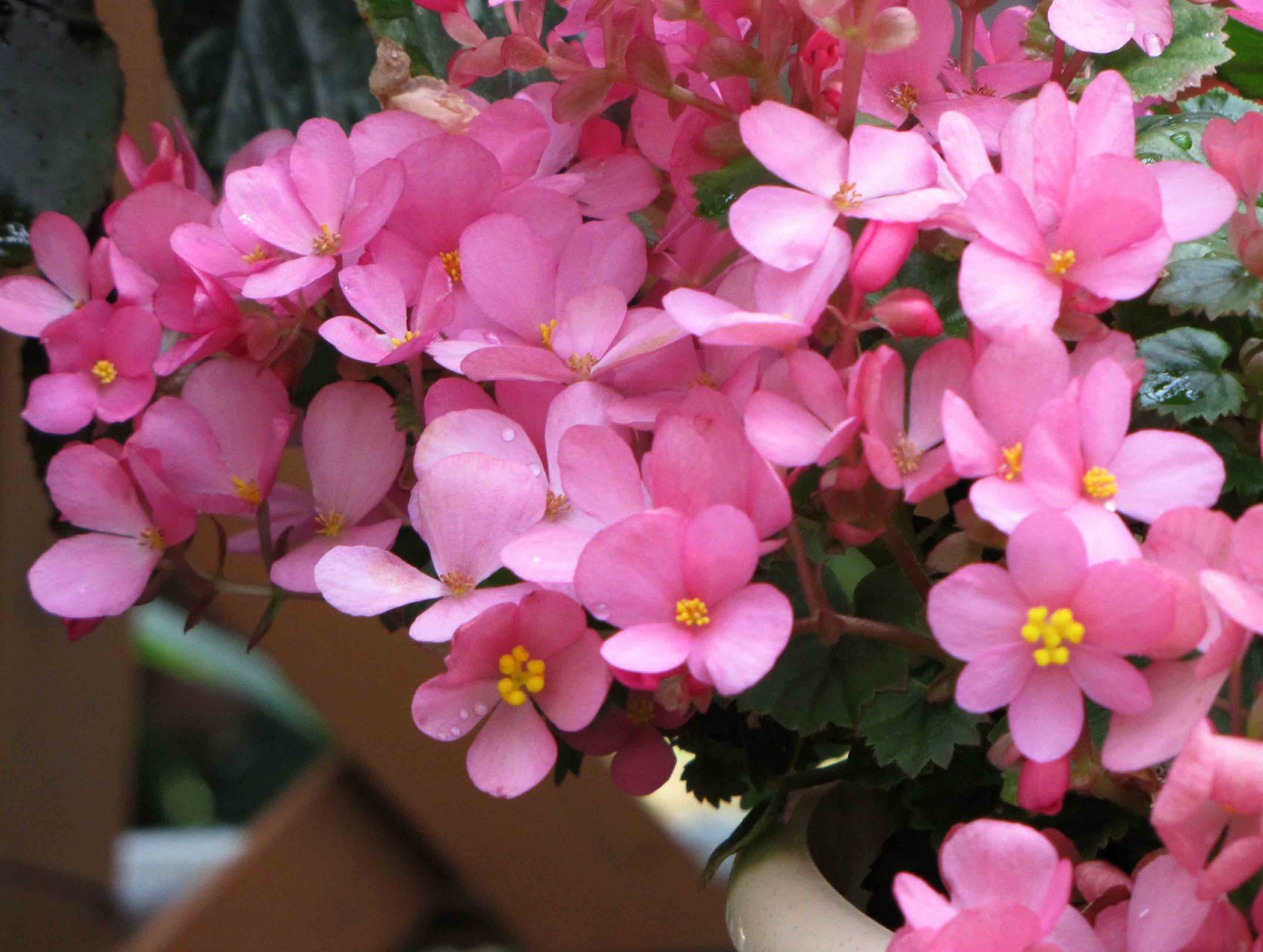
Begonia x cheimantha 'Love Me'

=== Cheimantha ===
Also called bulbous begonias, these are hybrids between B. dregei and B. socotrana.

== See also ==
- Begonia × tuberhybrida
