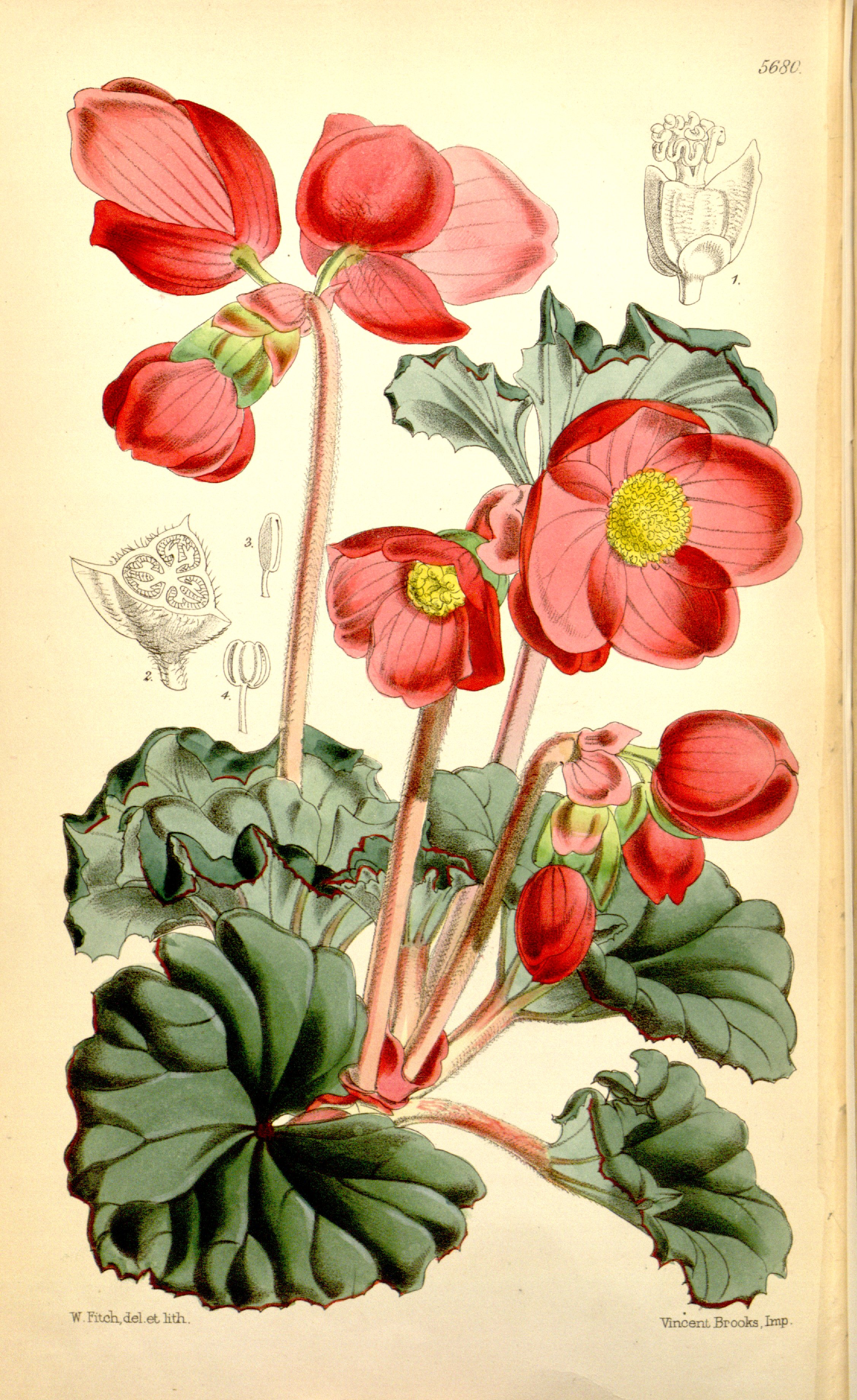

Scientific classification
- Kingdom: Plantae
- Clade: Tracheophytes
- Clade: Angiosperms
- Clade: Eudicots
- Clade: Rosids
- Order: Cucurbitales
- Family: Begoniaceae
- Genus: Begonia
- Species: B. veitchii

Binomial name
- Begonia veitchii Hook.f.

= Begonia veitchii =

Species of plant

Begonia veitchii is a plant in the begonia family, Begoniaceae, which was introduced to Europe in 1866 by Richard Pearce who discovered it in the Peruvian Andes near Cusco at an elevation of from 10,000 feet (3,000 m) and 12,000 feet (3,700 m). It was named after Pearce's employers, James Veitch & Sons of Chelsea, London. It can be found today in the mountains around Machu Picchu. A later plant collector, Walter Davis, found Begonia veitchii inhabiting rocky positions by waterfalls, in company with Masdevallia veitchiana.

Begonia veitchii played an important role in the development of today's popular hybrid cultivars and, together with Pearce's other introductions, B. boliviensis and B. pearcei, was subsequently hybridized to produce the Begonia × tuberhybrida cultivar group.

== Description ==
The flowers are bright red-orange. They have rounded petals and are displayed on strong erect stalks well above the foliage.

According to Hortus Veitchii, Sir Joseph Dalton Hooker, writing in the Botanical Magazine, described this as "the finest species then known", saying:

"Of all the species of Begonia known, this is, I think, the finest. With the habit of Saxifraga ciliata, immense flowers of a vivid vermilion cinnabar-red, that no colorist can reproduce, it adds the novel feature of being hardy in certain parts of England at any rate, if not in all."
