= Walter Davis (botanist) =

English plant collector and botanist

Walter Davis (14 September 1847 – 18 November 1930) was an English plant collector, who collected in South America for James Veitch & Sons of Chelsea, London.

== Career ==
=== Early life ===
Davis was born at Sarson Street, now part of Amport, near Andover, Hampshire. According to Hortus Veitchii, he "inherited from his father a taste for Natural History and outdoor pursuits, which later took the form of a love of gardening". At 12 years old, he left school and started work in the gardens of the Marquess of Winchester at Amport House; the house had been rebuilt in 1857, and the gardens were being re-modelled. He then moved to Wilton Park Gardens, at Beaconsfield where he stayed for four years, rising to the rank of departmental foreman.

His travels then took him to work for Mr. C. Ryder at Slade, Kent followed by a spell at the gardens of Mr. T. W. Evans at Allestree Hall, Derby, before, in 1870, he joined James Veitch & Sons at Chelsea, London.

=== James Veitch & Sons ===
At Chelsea, he worked under John Dominy in the "New Plant Department" and eventually became foreman in charge of the Nepenthes and fine foliage plants. In 1873, following the departures of George Downton and A. R. Endres, Harry Veitch was looking for a plant collector to travel to South America to locate and collect a quantity of the orchid, Masdevallia veitchiana, which had been introduced to England in 1867, following its discovery by Richard Pearce but was still scarce. Veitch selected Davis, and on 2 August 1873 he departed for South America.

He remained in South America for three years, during which time he crossed the Andean Cordilleras in Peru, Colombia and Bolivia at least twenty times, at elevations of up to 17,000 feet (5,200 m) and, like his predecessor Gustav Wallis he traversed the continent, travelling the entire length of the Amazon River.

During his trip, he was successful not only in collecting M. veitchiana but several other species of the genus, including the graceful violet-blue M. ionocharis (which he found in the Andean valley of Sandia, in the province of Carabaya, Peru, at 9,000 ft (2,700 m) elevation) and the golden-yellow M. davisii (the Incas' Qoriwaqanki or "golden waqanki"), which Davis discovered in the vicinity of Cusco, Peru. He sent flowers to Heinrich Reichenbach for identification; in The Gardeners' Chronicle, Reichenbach described this new species as "M. davisii", saying:

"This is a beautiful thing, much like M. harryana and veitchiana.... The other parts of the flower are yellowish, white and of the deepest splendid orange inside; so that it would appear to give a most welcome contrast in a group of the scarlet and vermillion and white Masdevallias. It was discovered by a, most probably new collector, Mr. W. Davis... I have a very good opinion of this collector, who was introduced to me by a set of new dried Orchids; so I thought it my duty to attach the name of such a promising collector to such a welcome Masdevallia."

Near Arequipa in Peru, he also discovered a new species of tuberous begonia, Begonia davisii, which was also named after him. B. davisii was later used in the early days of breeding Begonia × tuberhybrida cultivars by John Seden in the Veitch Nurseries at Coombe Wood.

=== Return to England ===
On his return to England in 1877, Davis was selected to conduct a botanical analysis of herbage on the experimental plots at Rothamsted. He returned to Chelsea on the termination of this engagement and re-commenced employment for Veitch Nurseries, working in the plant propagation department. He became a specialist in this field, and wrote for the Exchange & Mart for many years under the pseudonyms of Charles Benett (using his mother's maiden name) and Curiosus.

=== Later life ===
Davis continued to work for James Veitch & Sons until the dissolution of the business in 1914, after which he became secretary to the Geological Society and then the Royal Geographical Society. He also acted as secretary to a philanthropic society managed by American women in London.

Following a paralytic stroke which led to failing eyesight, Davis spent the last ten years of his life in retirement, in the care of his eldest daughter, in Fulham. He died on 18 November 1930, and his obituary in the Journal of Botany praised his contribution to botany: "with his passing the world of orchidology bids farewell to one of the last reminders of an elegant and exciting period in orchid discovery and cultivation".

== Publications ==
- Plant Propagation (1922) – "Description of the various methods employed by both amateur and professional gardeners."
