= Peperomia pearcei =

Scientific classification
- Kingdom: Plantae
- Clade: Tracheophytes
- Clade: Angiosperms
- Clade: Magnoliids
- Order: Piperales
- Family: Piperaceae
- Genus: Peperomia
- Species: P. pearcei

Binomial name
- Peperomia pearcei Trel.

Species of plant

Peperomia pearcei is a species of terrestrial or epiphytic herb in the genus Peperomia that is native to Peru. It grows on wet tropical biomes. Its conservation status is Threatened.

== Description ==
The type specimen were collected at Muña, Peru.

Peperomia pearcei is a slender, branching, glabrous herb. The leaves are in whorls of about 3 at the nodes. They are obovate, with a rounded apex and a cuneate base, measuring 8 mm long and 5 mm wide, and are 1-nerved. The peduncle is short. The terminal spikes are 30–40 mm long and 1 mm thick, with a peduncle about 1 cm long. The berries are ovoid, pointed, and bear a pseudocupula, with an apical stigma.

== Taxonomy and naming ==
It was described in 1936 by William Trelease in Publications of the Field Museum of Natural History, Botanical Series 13, from specimens collected by Richard Pearce.

The epithet pearcei honors Richard Pearce, the collector of the type specimen in Peru in 1863.

== Distribution and habitat ==
It is native to Peru. It grows as a terrestrial or epiphytic herb. It grows on wet tropical biomes.

== Conservation ==
This species is assessed as Threatened, in a preliminary report.
