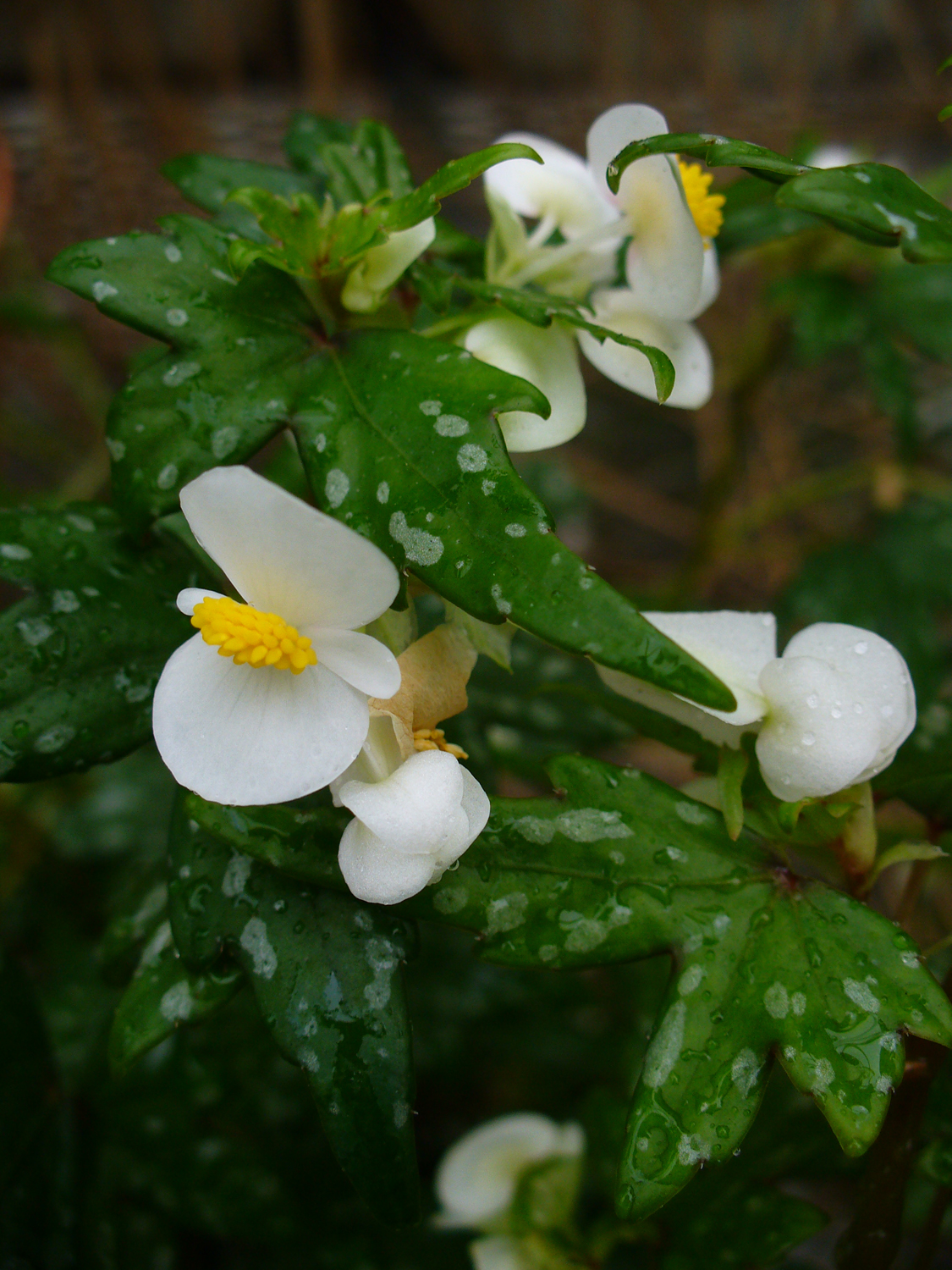

Scientific classification
- Kingdom: Plantae
- Clade: Tracheophytes
- Clade: Angiosperms
- Clade: Eudicots
- Clade: Rosids
- Order: Cucurbitales
- Family: Begoniaceae
- Genus: Begonia
- Species: B. dregei

Binomial name
- Begonia dregei Otto & A.Dietr.

Synonyms
- List: Augustia dregei (Otto & A.Dietr.) Klotzsch; Augustia natalensis Klotzsch; Augustia suffruticosa (Meisn.) Klotzsch; Begonia natalensis Hook.; Begonia partita Irmsch.; Begonia parvifolia Graham; Begonia richardsiana T.Moore; Begonia richardsoniana Houllet; Begonia rubicunda A.DC.; Begonia suffruticosa Meisn.

= Begonia dregei =

Species of flowering plant

Begonia dregei, the maple leaf begonia, grape-leaf begonia, or bonsai begonia, is a species of flowering plant in the genus Begonia native to the Eastern Cape and KwaZulu-Natal provinces of South Africa.

One of its most notable features is the swollen caudex, which stores moisture.

== Distribution and habitat ==
B. dregei is a drought-tolerant perennial herb. It grows primarily in forests near the coast, up to an altitude of 600m. They grow in small, isolated groups in the wild and cross-hybridize easily, which has historically caused some confusion.

== Plant Physiology ==
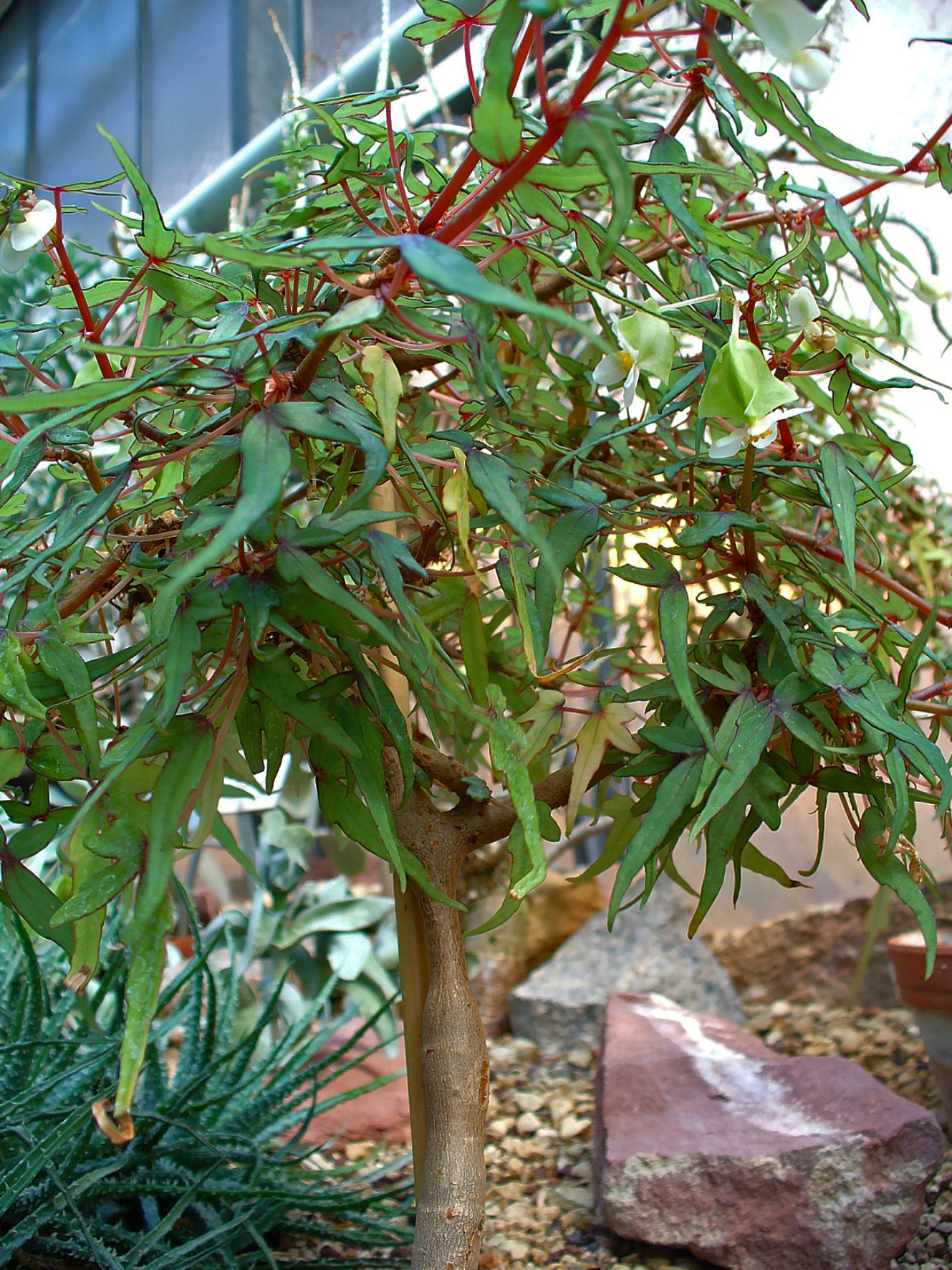
A B. dregei plant showing the woody stem

B. dregei is considered semi-tuberous, though it forms a woody caudex at its base, not a tuber. The woody caudex, small leaves, and the upright, branching growth habit makes the plant look tree-like, so B. dregei is sometimes grown as an herbaceous bonsai.

== Etymology ==
The specific epithet dregei is for Johann Franz Drège, a German horticulturist who spent lots of time is South Africa.

== History ==
B. dregei was introduced in 1800, making it one of the earliest begonias in Great Britain. It was first collected from the Cape of Good Hope.

== Horticulture ==
B. dregei is somewhat unusual in that it will hybridize with begonias of different horticultural groups. When crossed with rexes, upright plants with small leaves are usually produced. When crossed with cane begonias, the progeny are cane-like. When crossed with Begonia socotrana, cheimantha-type plants are the result. The American Begonia Society calls cheimantha-type begonias "cousins" to Rieger begonias.

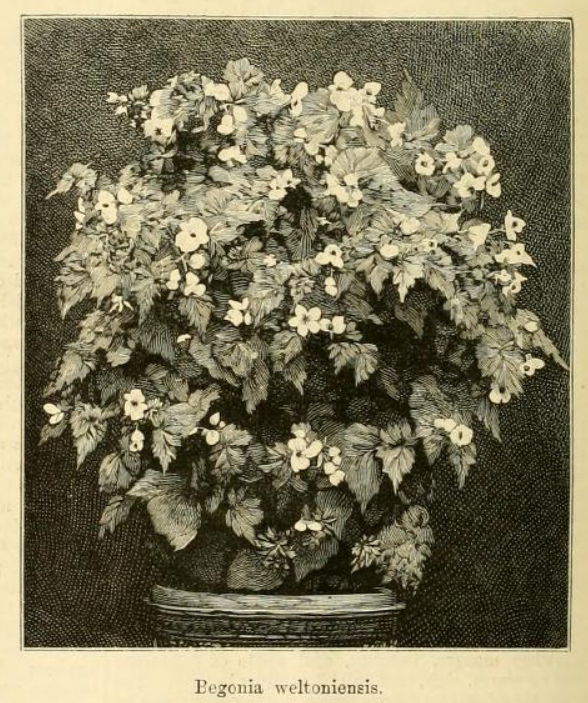
The engraving of B. 'Weltoniensis' in The Garden: an illustrated weekly journal of gardening in all its branches

Some of the more distinctive hybrids are B. 'Weltoniensis', B. 'Airy Fairy', and B. 'Richard Robinson'. B. 'Richard Robinson' is named for Alfred D. Robinson, who grew hundreds of plants from seed to prove B. dregei was a species. B. 'Weltoniensis', (which was originally spelled without the first 'i', "Weltonensis") was raised by Colonel Trevor Clark.

Plants grown from a cutting will have a much smaller caudex than plants grown from seed. In cultivation, B. dregei is prone to mealybugs and powdery mildew.

== Awards ==
It has gained the Royal Horticultural Society's Award of Garden Merit.
