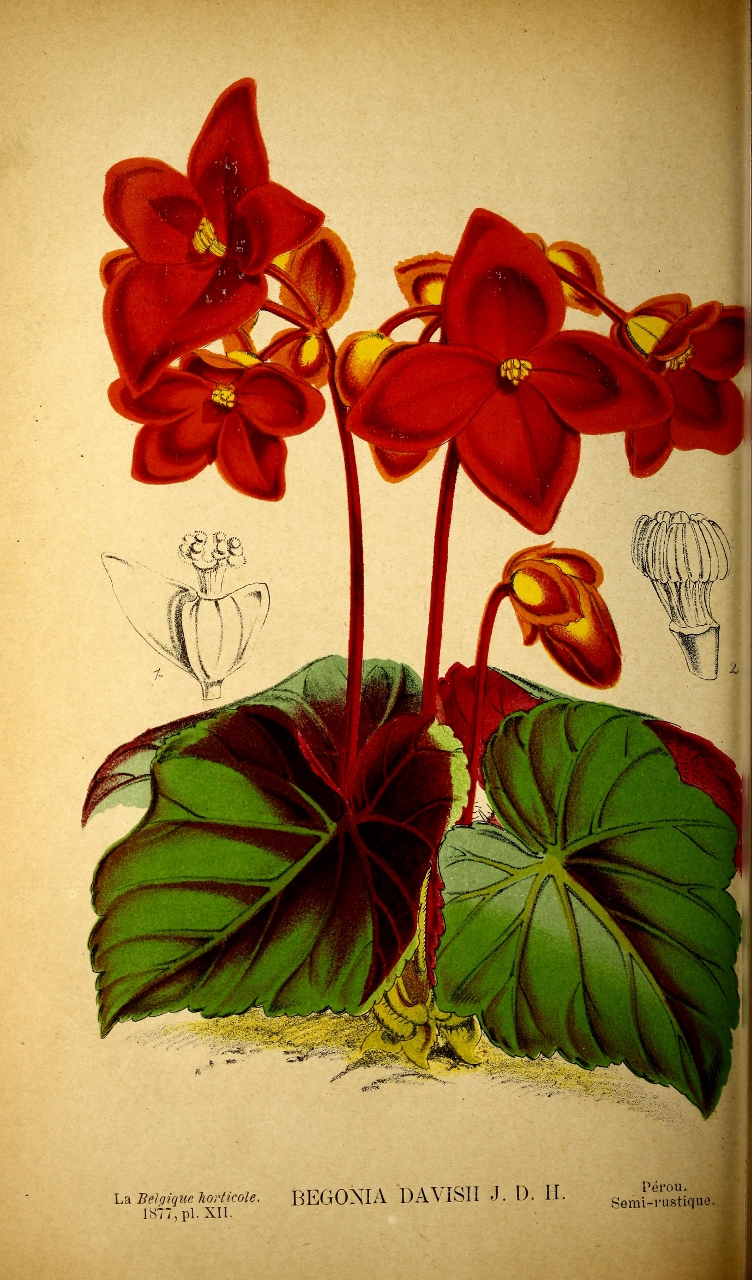

Scientific classification
- Kingdom: Plantae
- Clade: Tracheophytes
- Clade: Angiosperms
- Clade: Eudicots
- Clade: Rosids
- Order: Cucurbitales
- Family: Begoniaceae
- Genus: Begonia
- Species: B. davisii

Binomial name
- Begonia davisii Hook.f.

= Begonia davisii =

Species of plant

Begonia davisii is a plant in the begonia family, Begoniaceae, which was used in the early days of breeding Begonia × tuberhybrida cultivars.

It was discovered by the Victorian plant collector Walter Davis (after whom it was named) near Arequipa in Peru and was first introduced to England in 1877.

== Description ==
The plant has a dwarf, tufted habit with broadly ovate–cordate leaves, which are glossy bluish-green above and purplish beneath, with a slightly lobed serrated margin; the flowers are rich orange-scarlet in colour, arranged in threes on erect red-coloured scapes 6 inches (150 mm) to 8 inches (200 mm) high.

== Hybridization ==
The dwarf habit and erect flowers characteristic of this species were taken advantage of by John Seden, who rapidly evolved several garden forms, including a dwarf race of hybrids suitable for summer-bedding which became popular in Victorian England.

The cultivar, B. davisii Orangeade, which has double bright copper–orange flowers, is available commercially today.
