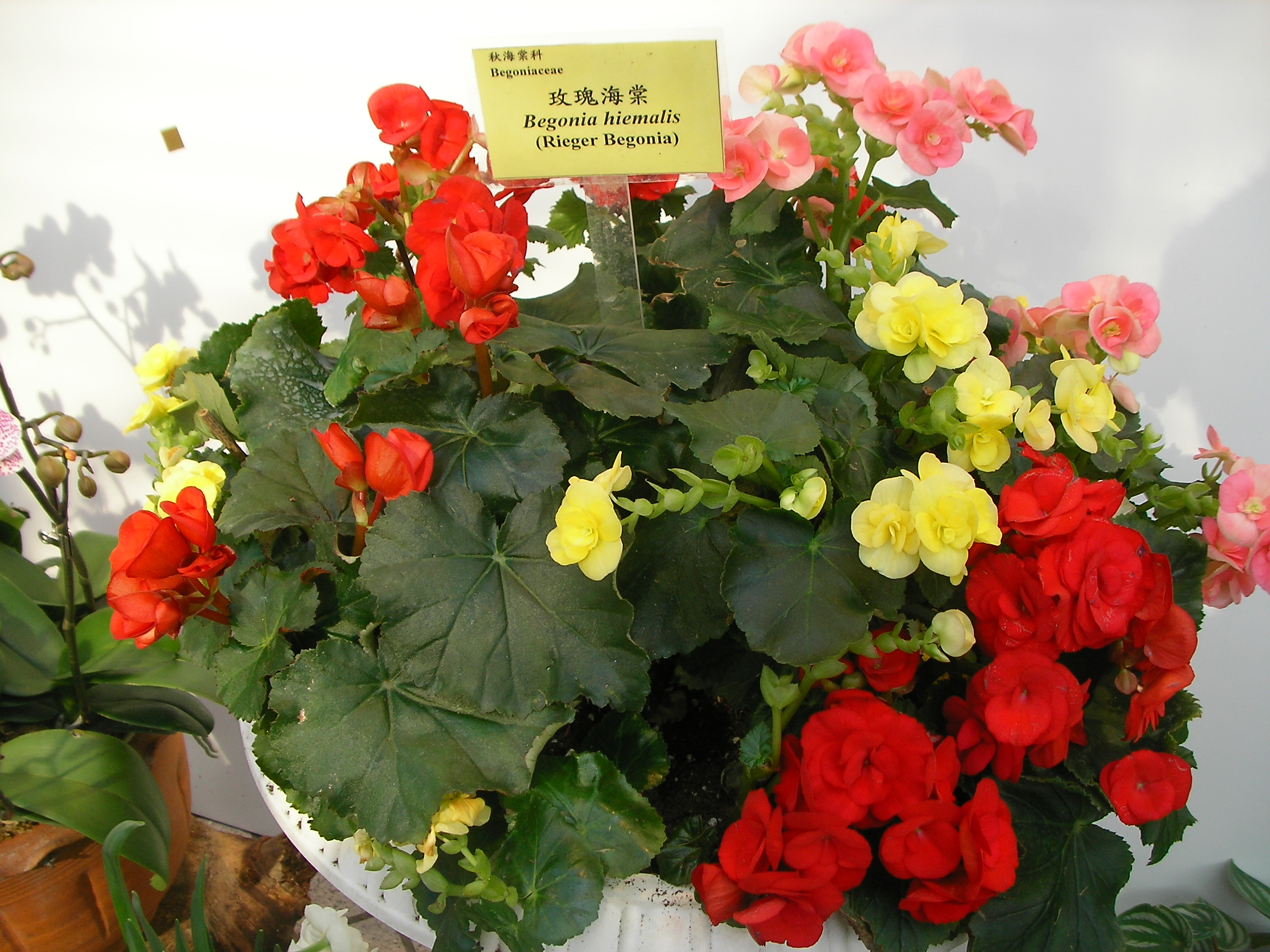
- Begonia × hiemalis sepals come in a wide variety of colors
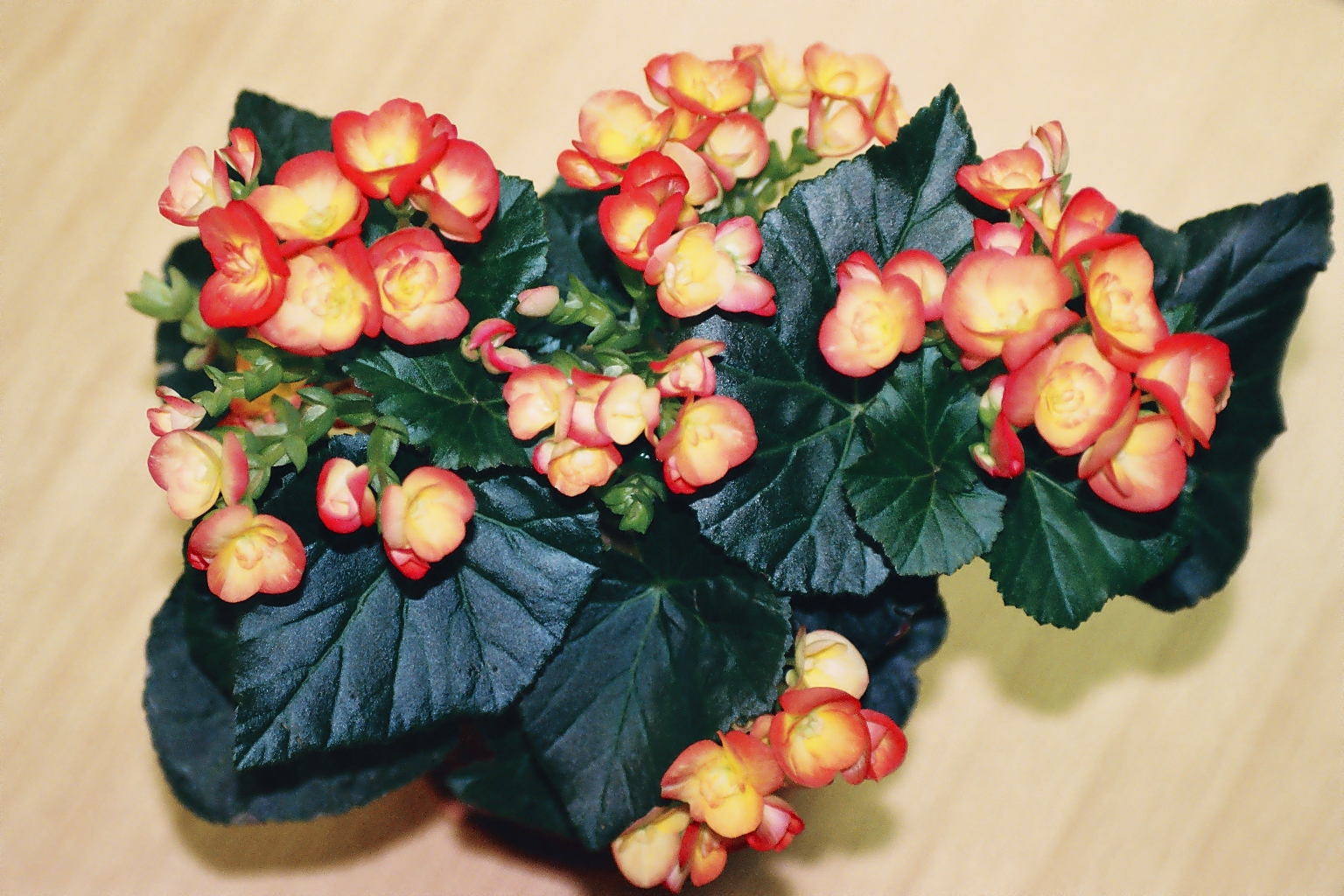
- Begonia × hiemalis 'Filur' cultivar

Scientific classification
- Kingdom: Plantae
- Clade: Tracheophytes
- Clade: Angiosperms
- Clade: Eudicots
- Clade: Rosids
- Order: Cucurbitales
- Family: Begoniaceae
- Genus: Begonia
- Species: B. × hiemalis

Binomial name
- Begonia × hiemalis Fotsch

= Begonia × hiemalis =

Species of plant

Begonia × hiemalis, the elatior begonia or Reiger begonia, is an artificial hybrid species of flowering plant in the family Begoniaceae. Its parents are Begonia socotrana and Begonia × tuberhybrida (itself a hybrid of multiple species). Hybridization efforts began in 1881, with the first cultivar named 'John Heal'. The 'Elatior' cultivar debuted in 1906, and beginning in 1950 Otto Rieger issued many new, disease-resistant cultivars, such that people began to call the group "elatior" or "Rieger" begonias. In addition to their typically doubled flowers which come in every color except blue, they are valued for their tendency to bloom in fall and winter, and in fact nearly year-round.

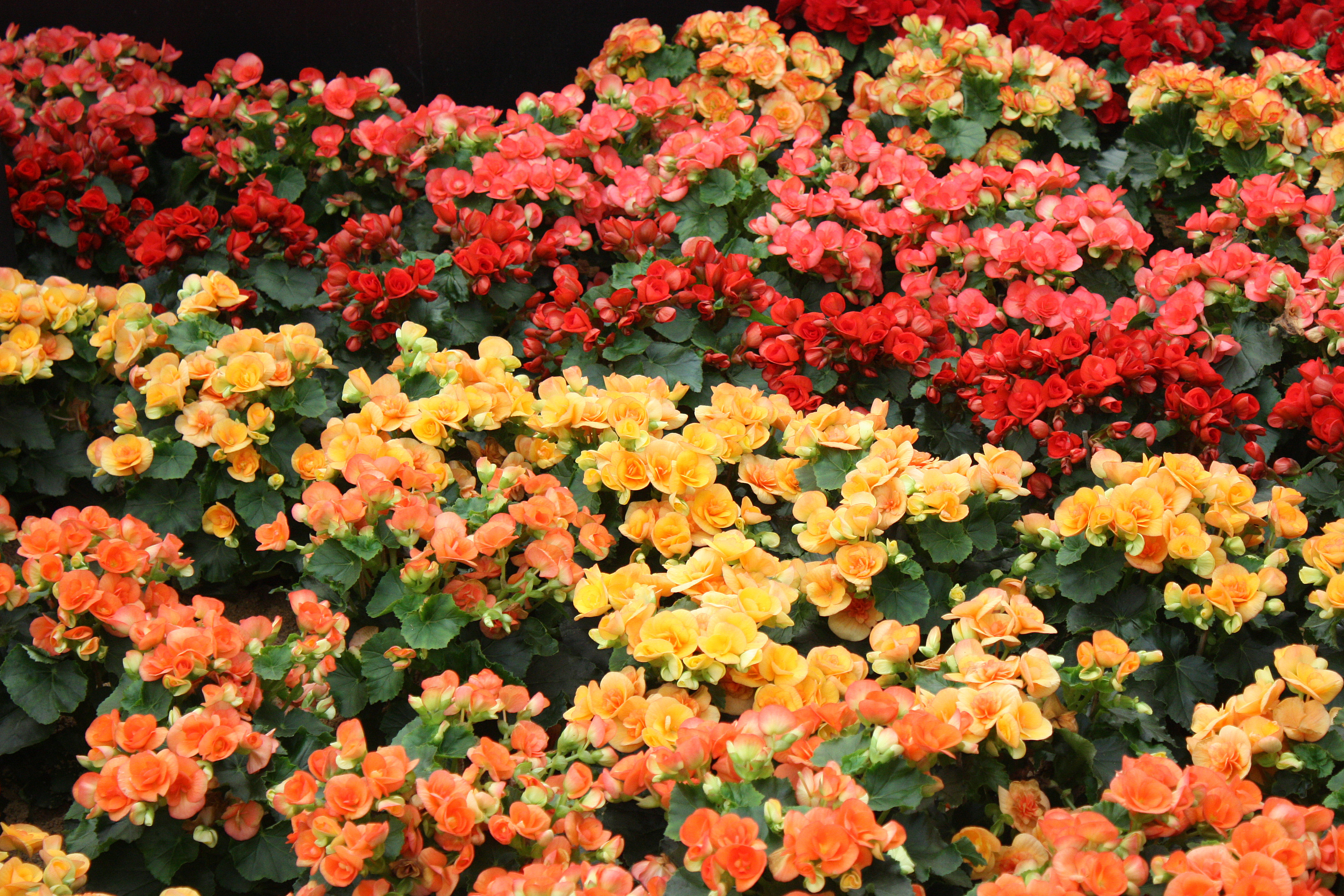
On display in Germany

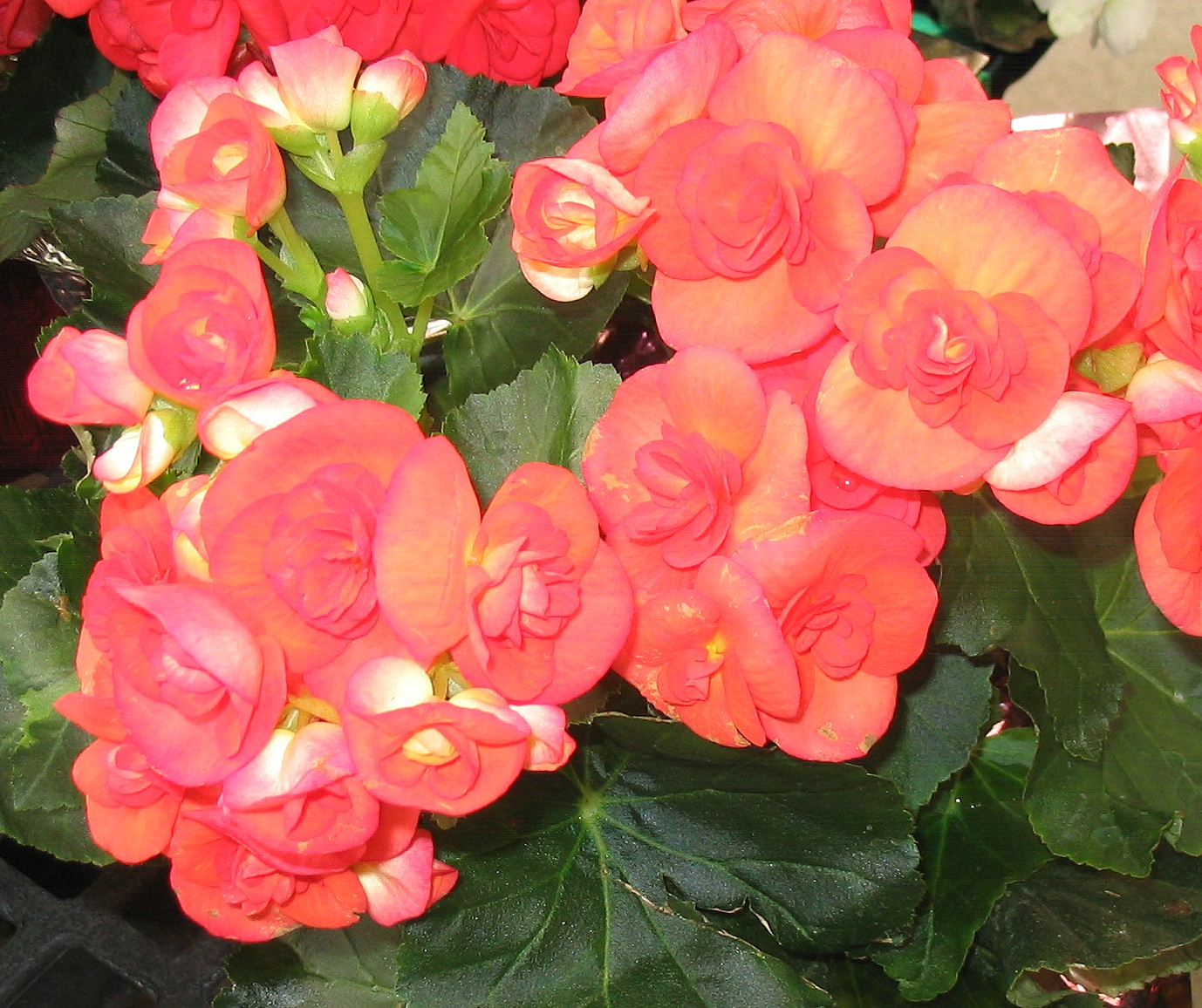
Some leaves are visible in this photo

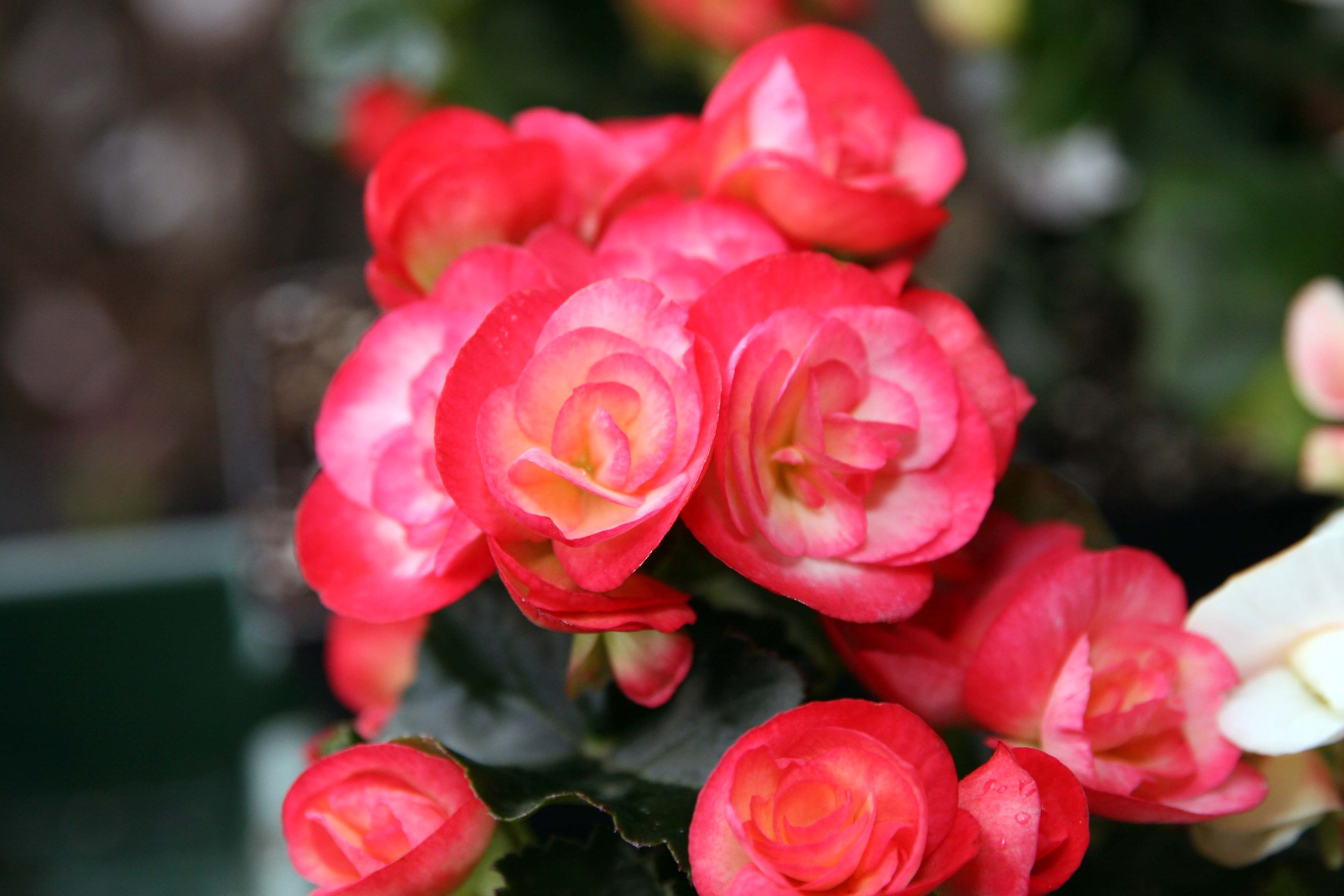
'Janny Fringed' cultivar

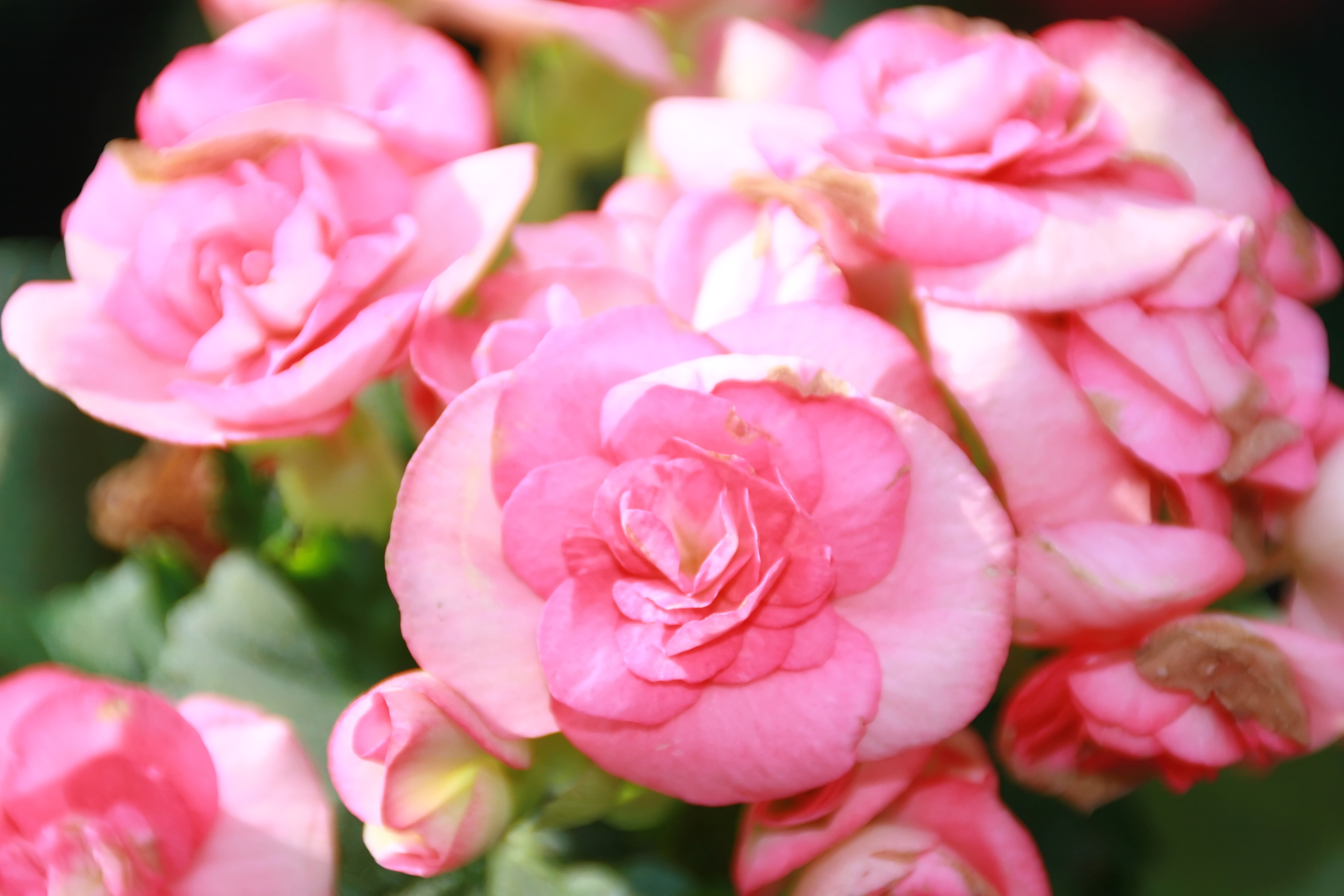
Close-up of a pink-flowered cultivar

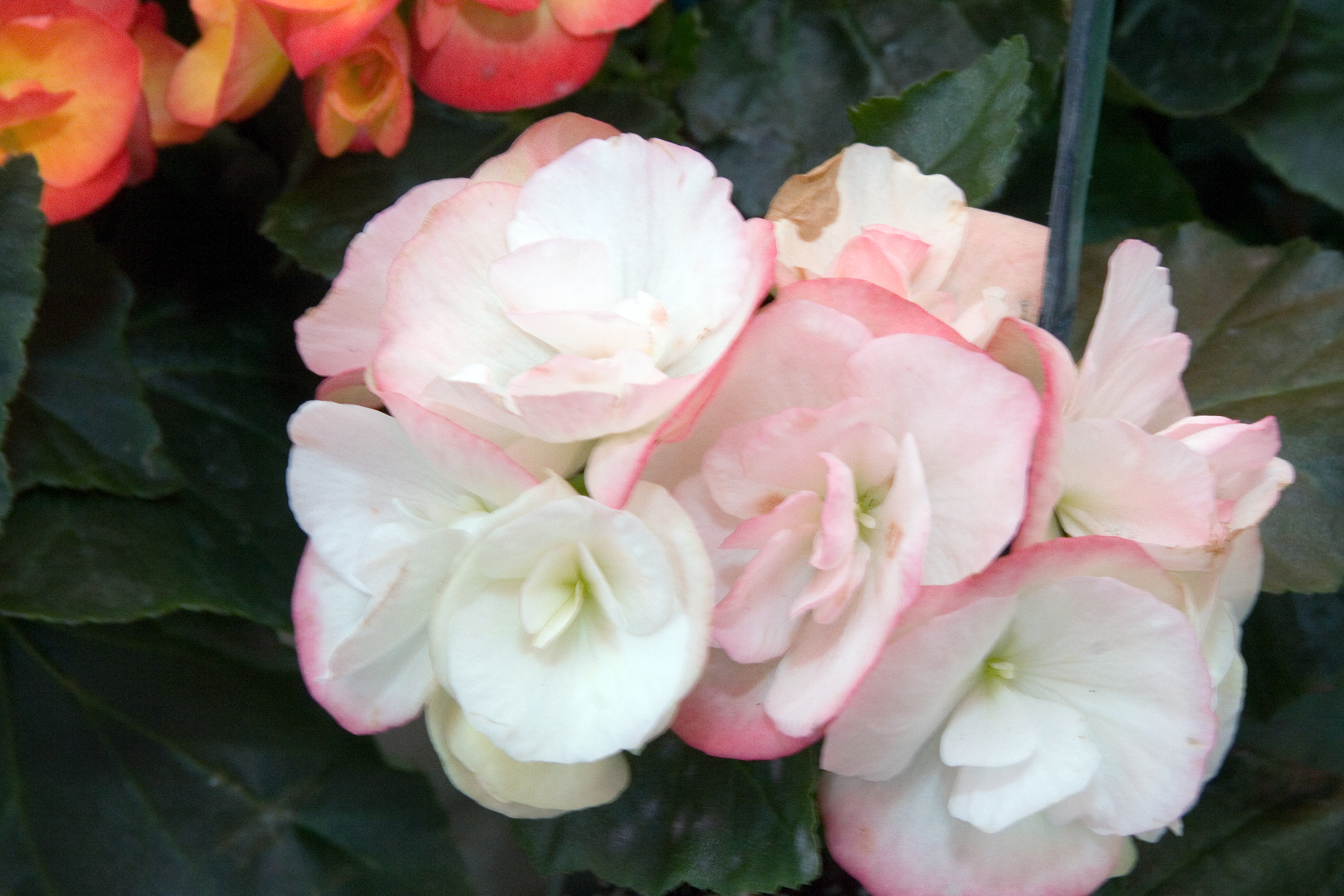
'Camilla 98' cultivar

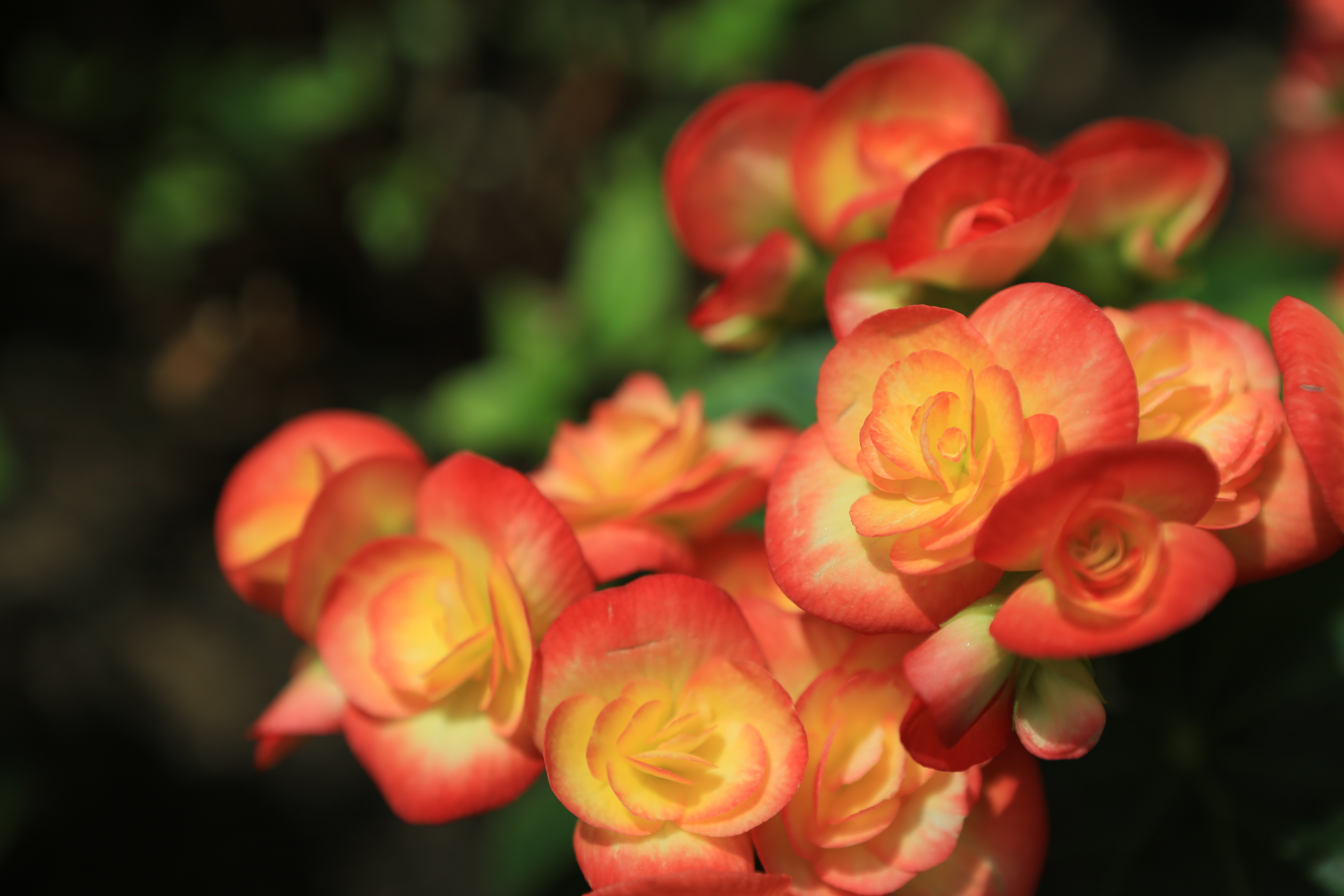
At the Gardens by the Bay, Singapore

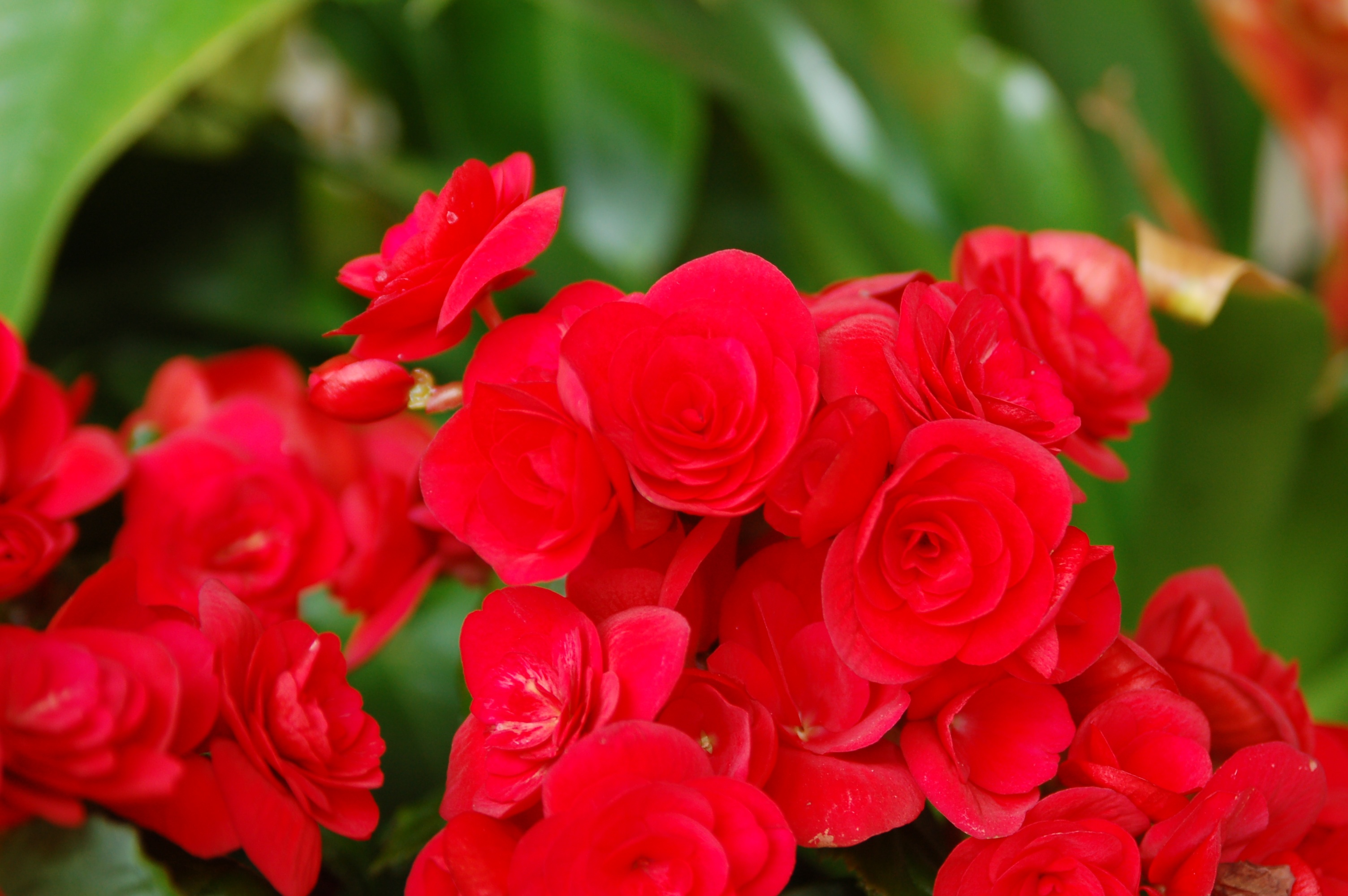
A red cultivar

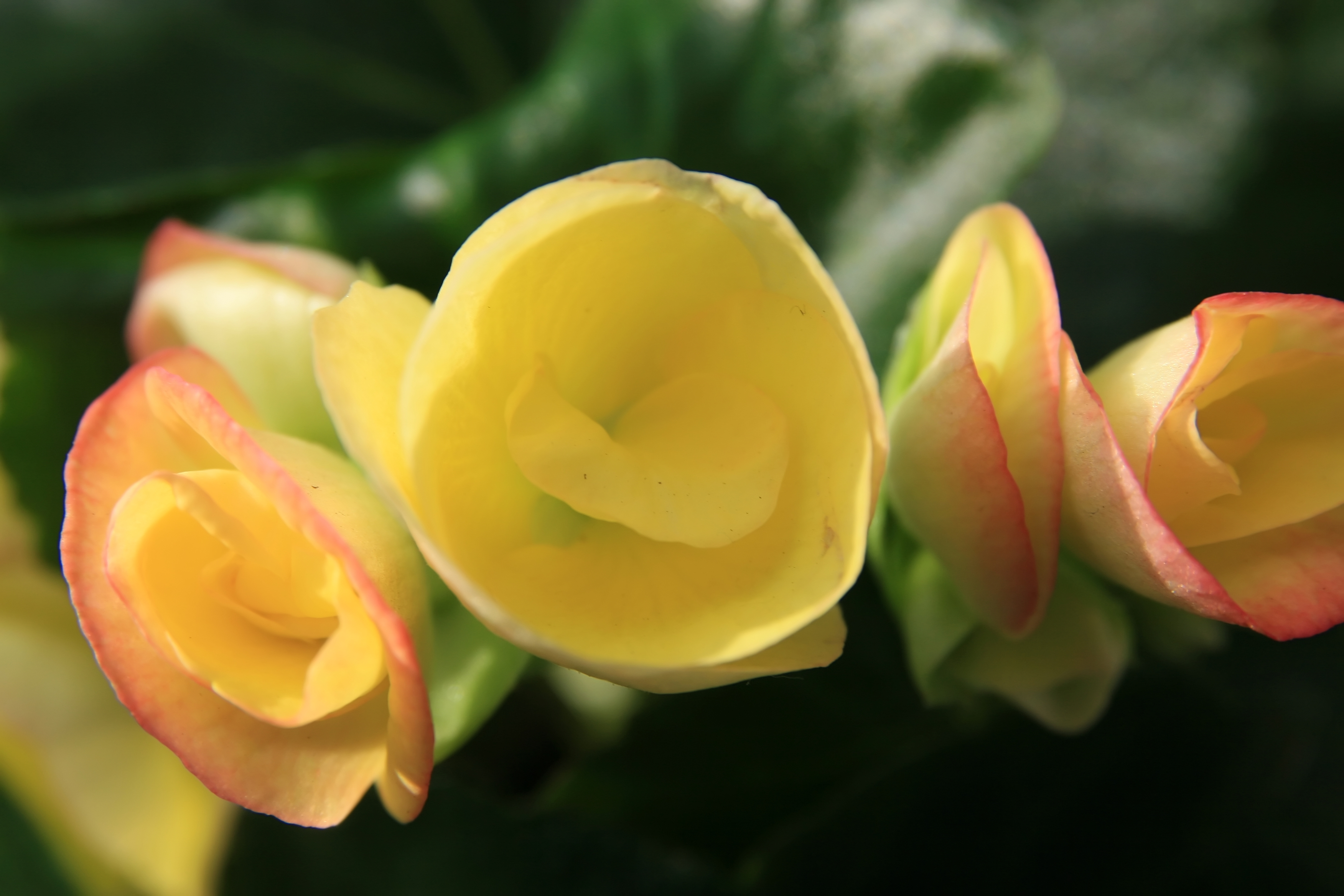
A yellow brushed with red Reiger-type cultivar

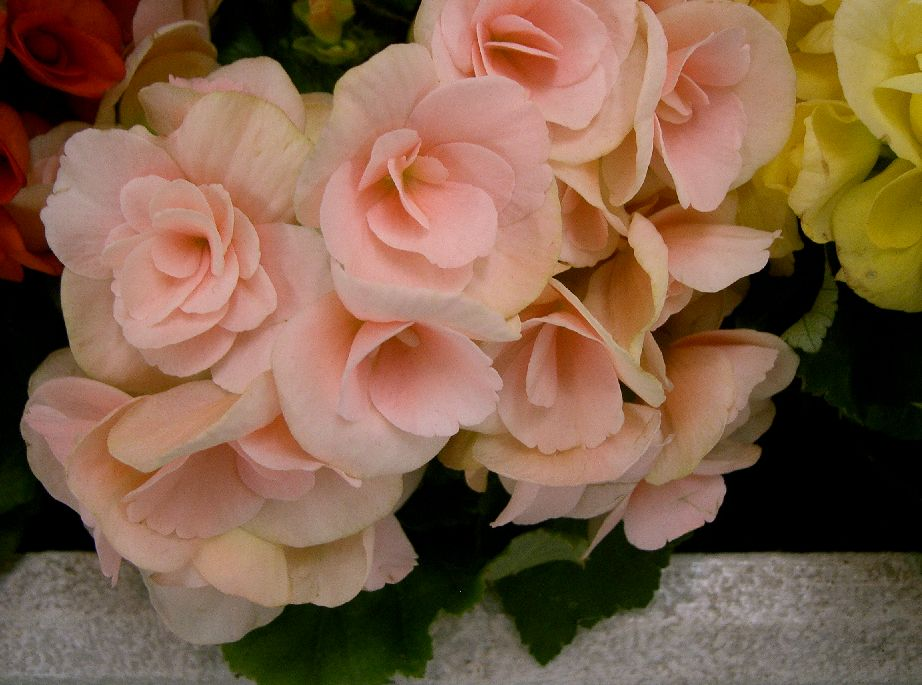
A shell-pink cultivar
