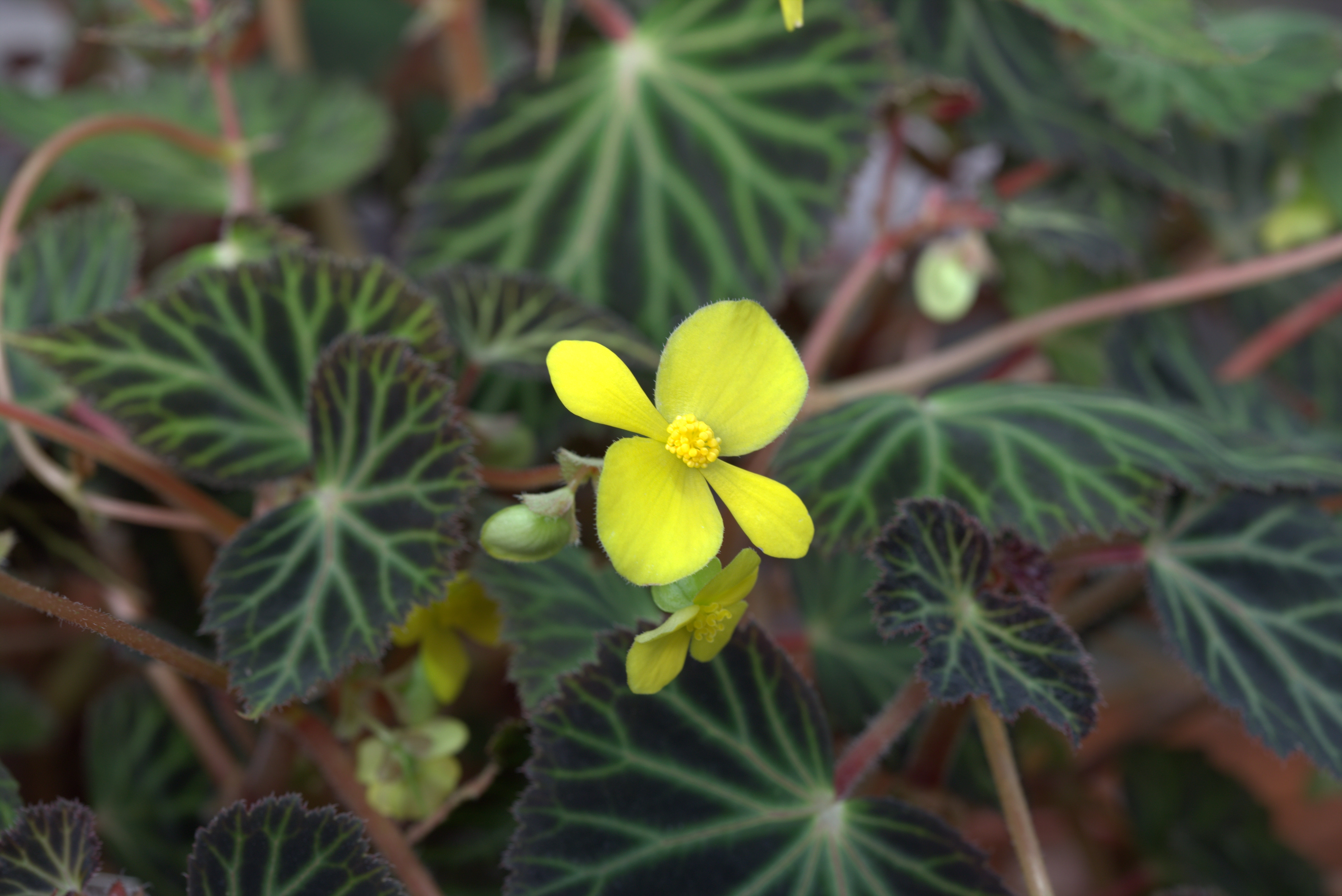

Scientific classification
- Kingdom: Plantae
- Clade: Tracheophytes
- Clade: Angiosperms
- Clade: Eudicots
- Clade: Rosids
- Order: Cucurbitales
- Family: Begoniaceae
- Genus: Begonia
- Species: B. pearcei

Binomial name
- Begonia pearcei Hook.f.

= Begonia pearcei =

Species of flowering plant

Begonia pearcei is a plant in the begonia family, Begoniaceae. It was introduced to Europe in 1864 by Richard Pearce (after whom it was named) who discovered it in the Bolivian Andes on the south-eastern altiplano, where it's likely endemic. It's a tuberous geophyte and grows primarily in seasonally dry tropical biomes.

B. pearcei is important in the hybridizing of the Begonia × tuberhybrida begonias, the first of which appeared in 1867. All B. x tuberhybrida cultivars with yellow flowers are direct descendants of B. pearcei.

== Description ==
This begonia is still grown today, and has dark green leaves with a velvety texture and very marked veins. The small, bright yellow flowers add interest, as it is the only yellow among the tuberous species. Its introduction into the breeding programmes led to today's yellow-flowered forms.

The description in Hortus Veitchii reads:

The plant is of tufted habit, has the unusual quality of possessing ornamental foliage and showy flowers. The leaves are dark velvety green above, traversed by straw-coloured veins: the under surface dark red with the exception of a prominent venation. Well above the handsome leaves are borne the bright yellow flowers, usually three in number, on slender scapes.

== Images ==
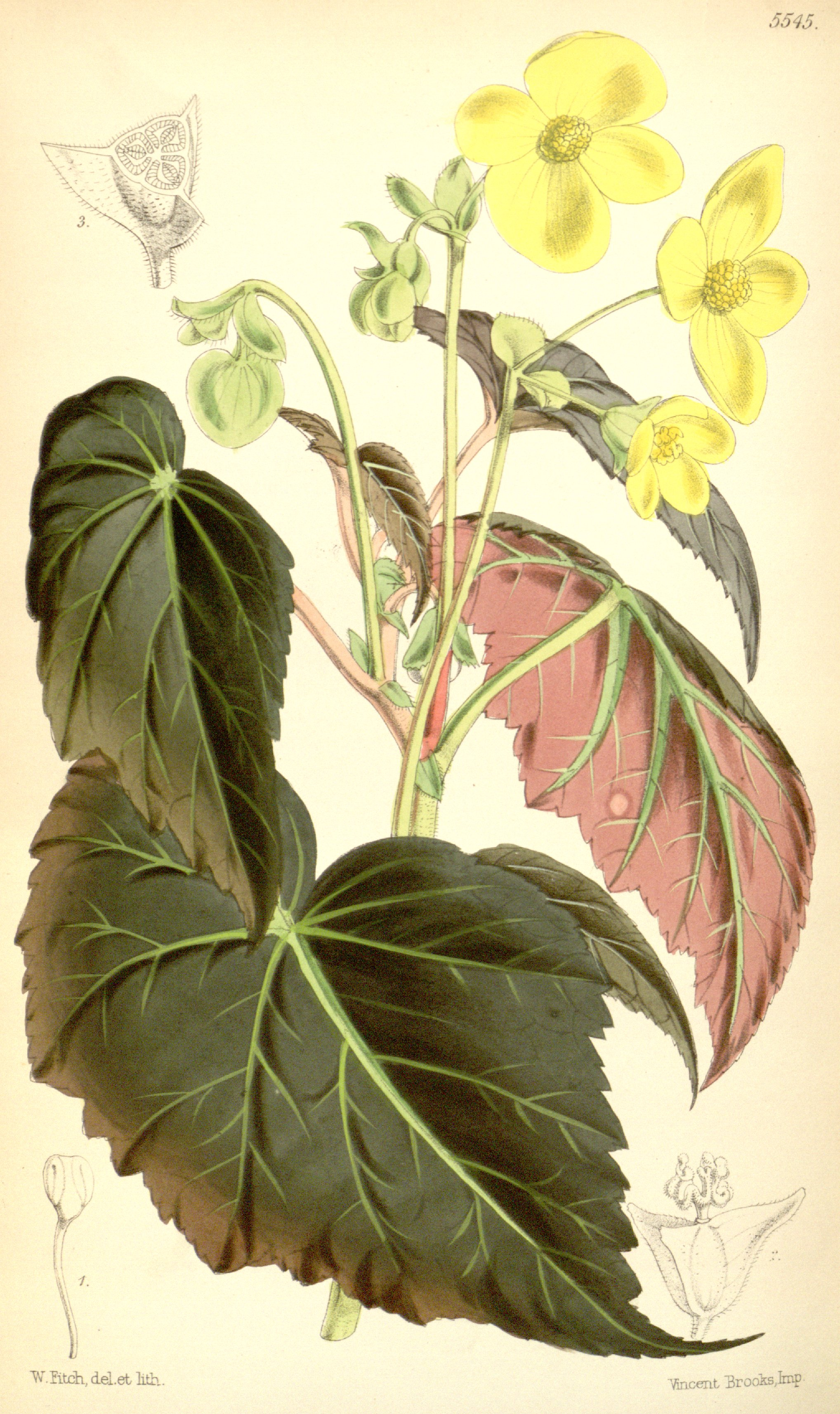
