= Richard Pearce (botanist) =

British botanist (1835–1868)

Richard Pearce (c. 1835 – 17 July 1868) was a British plant collector, who introduced the tuberous begonia to England, which led to the development of the hybrid begonias grown today.

== Early career ==
Pearce was born at Stoke, Devonport in Devon. His first employment was with Pontey's nursery in Plymouth, where he stayed until about 1858, when he went to work at the nursery of James Veitch at Mount Radford, near Exeter.

== Plant collecting ==
=== James Veitch & Sons ===
In February 1859, Pearce was sent by Veitch to South America for three years as a "collector of plants, seeds, land-shells and other objects of Natural History". Pearce travelled initially to Valparaíso, with instructions to collect in Chile and Patagonia. In particular, he was directed to collect seeds of Libocedrus tetragona, at that time supposed to be the tree which produced the famous Alerce timber. His agreement also required him to locate and collect the Chilean Bellflower, Lapageria rosea and its white variety L. alba, the Chile Pine (then known as Araucaria imbricata) and other hardy trees and shrubs as well as to collect orchids and stove (hothouse) and greenhouse flowering plants.

Pearce successfully carried out his instructions, and as well as the plants he was contracted to collect, he also obtained and introduced Prumnopitys elegans, Podocarpus nubigenus, Eucryphia glutinosa, several Bomareas, Cavendishia bracteata, Ourisia coccinea, Ourisia pearcei (a synonym of Ourisia coccinea subsp. coccinea) and quantities of ferns, the Victorian fern craze then being at its height. His researches on this trip showed that the tree that produced Alerce timber was the Patagonian Cypress, Fitzroya cupressoides and not Libocedrus tetragona as had been previously thought.

During 1860 Pearce made many journeys to the mountains and the interior of Chile. He wrote of the scenery of that part of the Chilean Cordilleras which he explored:

"It is of the most charming description: gently undulating meadows covered with a carpet of short grass, placid lakes reflecting from their smooth surface the mountains around, foaming cataracts and gentle rivulets, deep gorges and frightful precipices, over which tumble numerous dark, picturesque waterfalls reaching the bottom in a cloud of spray. High rocky pinnacles and lofty peaks, surround one on every side.

"Nor is the vegetation less beautiful and interesting. At an elevation of 4,000 ft. the vegetation exhibits a totally different character from that of the coast. Here one finds Antarctic Beeches (Fagus antarctica and F. betuloides), which constitute with Fitzroya patagonica the large forest trees. The Embothrium coccineum, Desfontainia spinosa, Philesia buxifolia, three species of Berberis, Pernettya and Gaultheria are the most abundant of the flowering shrubs, whilst the numerous pretty little rock-plants meet one at every step with their various forms and colours."

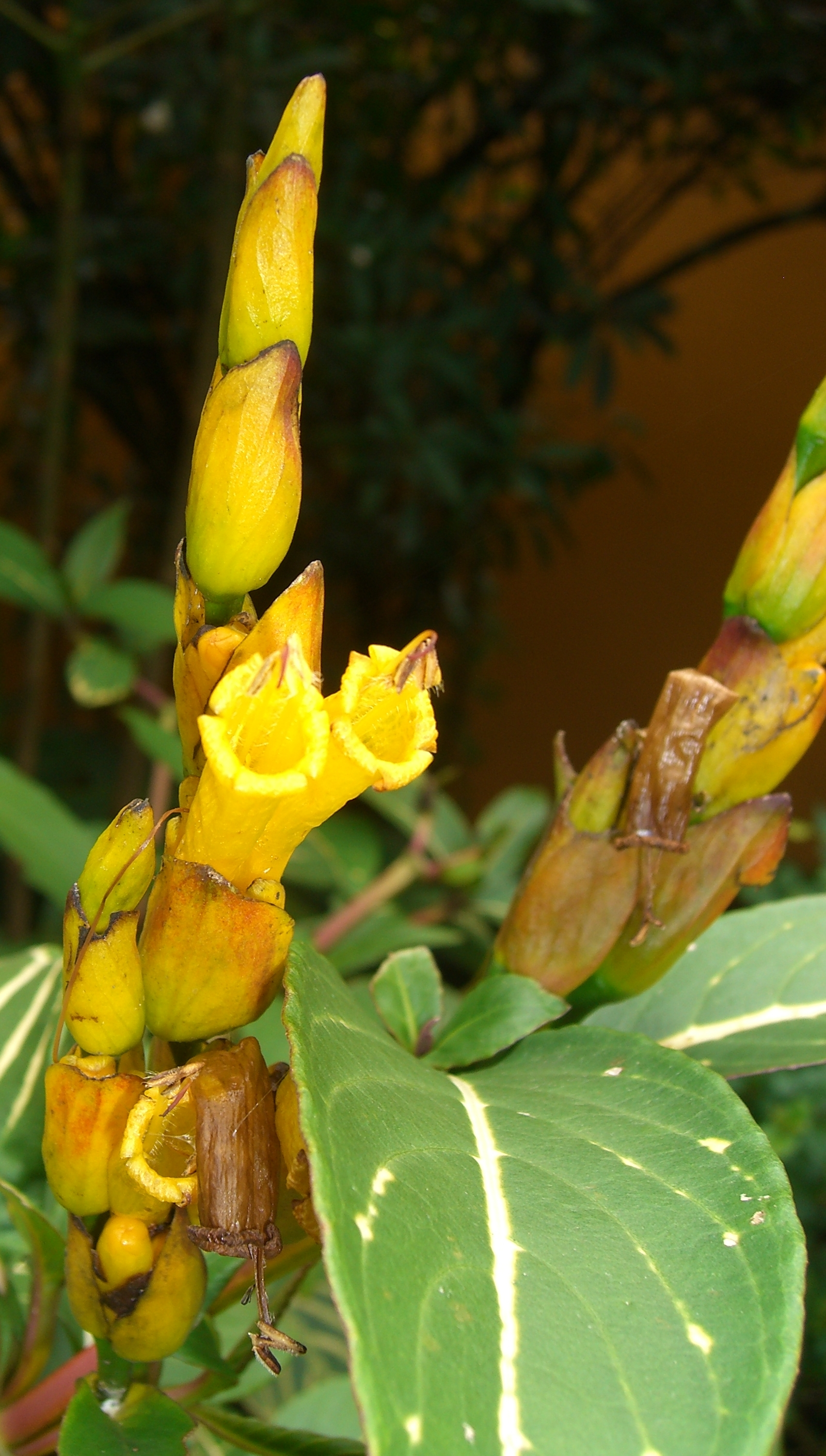
Sanchezia nobilis

Early in 1862 Pearce left Chile and travelled north to Peru and Bolivia, before moving on to Ecuador in search of stove and greenhouse plants. From Cuenca he sent seeds of many plants, including Befaria ledifolia, Lisianthus magnificus, Calceolaria ericoides, and several kinds of Tacsonia, before returning from Guayaquil to Britain with six large Wardian cases of plants, amongst which was a handsome plant of the Marantaceae, which was named Calathea veitchiana in honour of his employers.

In January 1863, James Veitch again sent him to South America on another three-year expedition "to collect plants, seeds and other objects of Natural History". He travelled initially to Lima, Peru, from where he was to travel to "such parts of South America as by written instructions to him should be determined. Particular attention was to be directed to the Tucumán Province, [Argentina] should there be facilities for reaching that country." His travels took him through Peru, Ecuador and Bolivia, before eventually reaching Tucumán. Amongst the plants that he discovered on this expedition and introduced to European hot-houses were Aphelandra nitens and Sanchezia nobilis. From Argentina, he collected Nierembergia rivularis and N. veitchii, Palava flexuosa, Mutisia decurrens and several varieties of Peperomia. On his return to La Paz, in November 1865 he also sent back to England a number of Hippeastrums, including H. pardinum and H. leopoldii and some samples of Eccremocarpus which were subsequently lost.

Pearce continued to explore the Andes; one of his final discoveries before returning to Britain was Masdevallia veitchiana, which he discovered in Peru and successfully introduced to cultivation.

=== Begonias ===
Whilst exploring in the Andes, Pearce discovered three varieties of tuberous begonia, which were introduced to Britain, and became the fore-runners of the many varieties now available:

Begonia boliviensis was discovered in the Bolivian Andes by Pearce in 1864 and shortly afterwards was introduced to Europe. Begonia boliviensis is of special historical interest to gardeners, being one of the species used by John Seden in the production of the first hybrid tuberous begonia raised in Britain, Begonia × sedenii.

Begonia pearcei, discovered in Bolivia in 1864, is also important in the hybridising of the Begonia × tuberhybrida begonias, the first of which appeared in 1867.

Begonia veitchii was introduced to Europe in 1866 after Pearce discovered it in the Peruvian Andes near Cusco at an elevation of from 10,000–12,000 feet. Begonia veitchii played an important role in the development of today's popular hybrid cultivars and, together with Pearce's other introductions, B. boliviensis and B. pearcei, was subsequently hybridized to produce the Begonia × tuberhybrida cultivar group.

Pearce also brought back from Peru a species he named Begonia rosiflora, but this has subsequently been considered to be the same as B. veitchii, since the two forms differ only slightly, mainly in flower colour.

== Later career and death ==
On returning from La Paz in 1866, Pearce's contract with James Veitch & Sons was terminated and he returned to his home at Plymouth, where he married.

In 1867 he moved to London where he was contracted by William Bull to travel back to South America in search of Masdevallia veitchiana. On arrival in Panama he set off in search of a species of Cypripedium (C. planifolium) which he had been advised was growing nearby. His search was in vain and following his return to Panama City, he was taken ill on 13 July, and died on 17 July 1867 (aged 33) of yellow fever transmitted by a mosquito bite.

According to Hortus Veitchii, "as a botanical collector Pearce was one of the best, and his untimely death was a great loss to the world of horticulture".
