= John Dominy =

British horticulturist and plant hybridiser

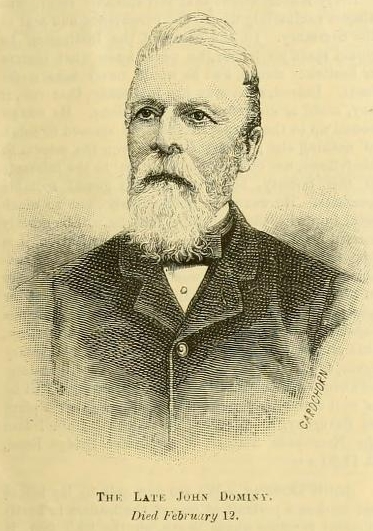
John Dominy

John Dominy (1816 – 12 February 1891) was a British horticulturist and plant hybridiser. He is best known as a gardener at the Veitch Nurseries, where he worked most of his life, first at James and James Veitch in Exeter (1834–1841) and later at the group's Chelsea-based business (c. 1846–1880). In 1856 Dominy flowered the first known manmade orchid hybrid, Calanthe Dominyi (Calanthe masuca × Calanthe triplicata). He is also noted for hybridising Nepenthes and fuchsias. During his time at the Veitch Nurseries, Dominy mentored John Seden, who would go on to become a distinguished hybridist in his own right.

== Life ==
Dominy was born in Gittisham, near Honiton in South Devon in 1816. He served his apprenticeship as a gardener for a private household before, in 1834, he joined the nursery of Lucombe, Pince & Co. in Exeter. He stayed there a few months before joining the nearby Veitch Nurseries. He remained with Veitch initially until 1841 before being appointed head gardener to J. P. Magor of Redruth in Cornwall.

After spending nearly five years at Redruth, Dominy returned to the Veitch Nurseries, working both at Exeter and the firm's new branch in Chelsea, before poor health forced his retirement in 1880.
