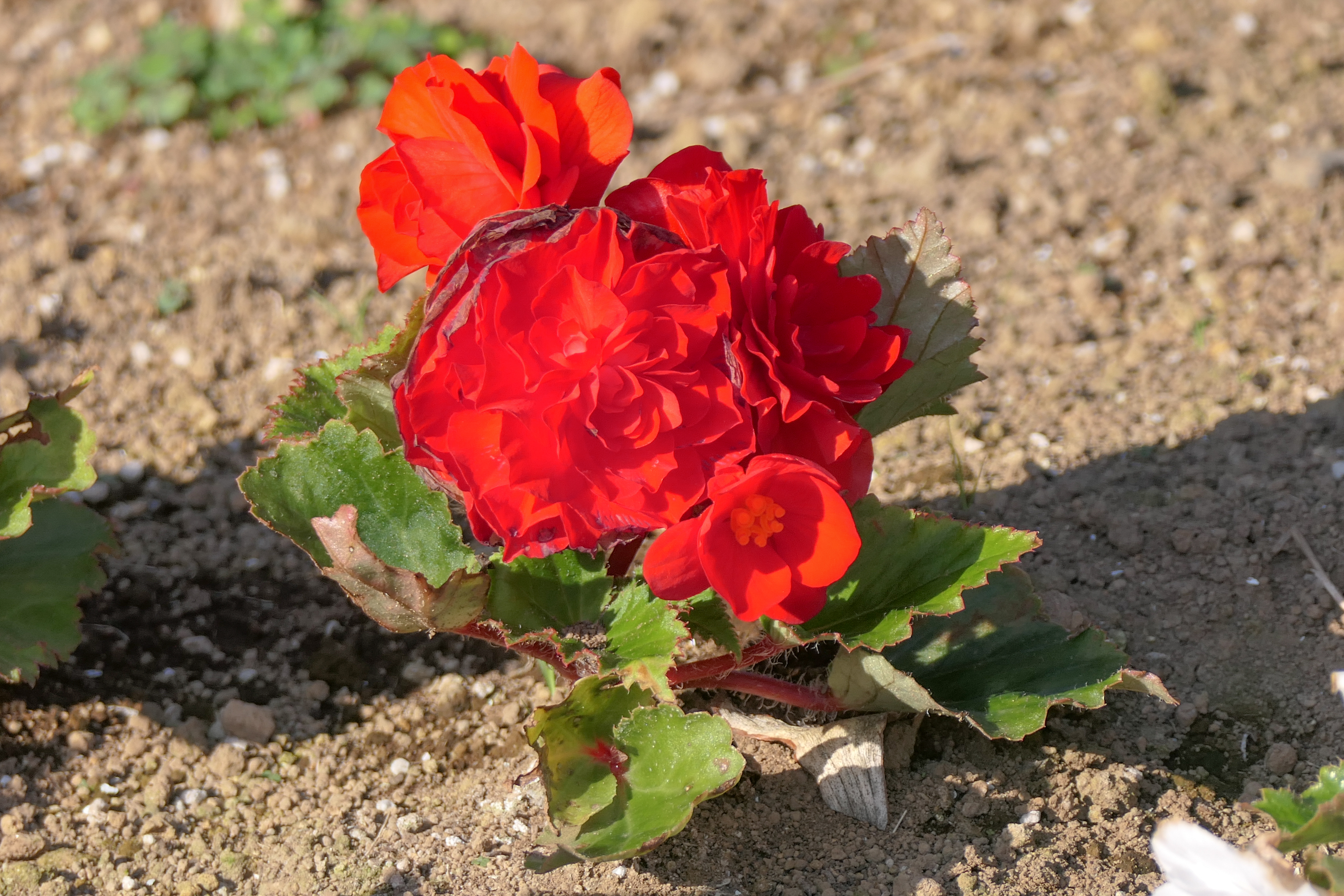

Scientific classification
- Kingdom: Plantae
- Clade: Tracheophytes
- Clade: Angiosperms
- Clade: Eudicots
- Clade: Rosids
- Order: Cucurbitales
- Family: Begoniaceae
- Genus: Begonia
- Species: B. × tuberhybrida

Binomial name
- Begonia × tuberhybrida Voss

Synonyms
- Begonia Tuberhybrida Group

= Begonia × tuberhybrida =

Genus of flowering plants

Begonia × tuberhybrida, also known as the Tuberhybrida Group or the Tuberosa Group, are a group of tuberous Begonia cultivars named for the tubers that lie dormant after the plants dies back in the fall or winter, from which the plant regrows in the spring or fall. This type of begonia is usually grown for the flowers they produce, sometimes regarded as some of the most spectacular of the genus. They can be as small as half an inch to as big around as dinner plates. They come in all shades but blue, and some have different colored edges, or are scented. They vary in growth habit, some kinds trailing with pendulant flowers, others with sturdy, upright stalks.

Tuberhybrida begonias were one of the first types of begonias ever to be hybridized. One of the first hybrids produced was B. x sedenii in 1870, a cross between B. boliviensis, collected by botanist Richard Pearce, and a species from the Andes. Another species from Peru, B. davisii (named after Walter Davis), was also used in early breeding.

Begonia × tuberhybrida is one of the most popular types of begonia grown worldwide. They are the complex result of decades of hybridizing for specific species traits, such as flowers and cold-hardiness. They are created primarily from high altitude Latin-American species. All tuberhybrida go dormant for the winter, and upright varieties benefit from staking to support the flowers.

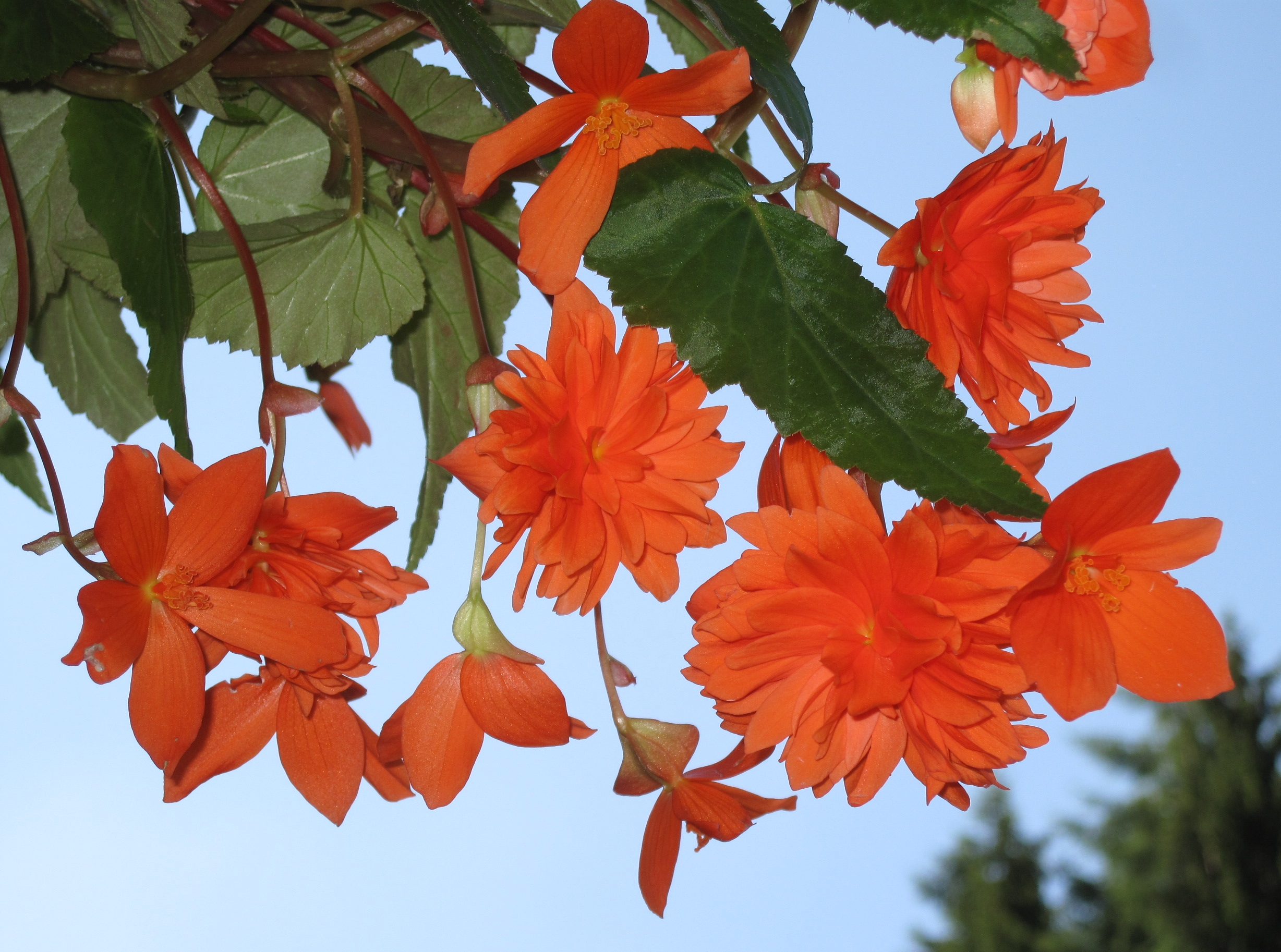
Begonia pendula is sometimes included in B. tuberhybrida

== Nomenclature ==
To describe the flower-shape of a tuberous begonia, the following abbreviations are sometimes used:

1. (S) Single – large single flowers, four usually flat tepals (flower part undistinguishable as sepal or petal)
2. (Fr) Frilled, Crispa – large single flowers, tepal margins frilled or ruffled
3. (Cr) Cristata, Crested – large single flowers, frilled or tufted center of tepals
4. (N) Narcissiflora, Daffodil-flowered – large more or less double flowers, central tepals form "trumpet"
5. (C) Camellia, Camelliflora – large double flowers resembling camellias, unruffled, solid colors
6. (RC) Ruffled Camellia – camellia flowers ruffled on edges
7. (R) Rosebud, Rosiflora – large double flowers with rose bud-like center
8. (Car) Carnation, Fimbriata Plena – large double carnation-like flowers, tepals fringed on margins
9. (P) Picotee – large usually double flowers like camellias, tepals with different color on margin blending with other color
10. (M) Marginata – like Picotee only distinct non-blending line of color on margins
11. (Mar) Marmorata, Marbled – like Camellia but rose-colored, blotched or spotted with white
12. (HB) Hanging Basket, Pendula – stems trailing or pendant, large to small flowers single or double
13. (Mul) Multiflora – low, bushy, compact plants with many small single or double flowers

Some systems confusingly use binomial nomenclature to refer to flower types, by the terms Begonia grandiflora, Begonia multiflora and Begonia pendula. The last two correspond to groups 13 and 12, respectively. The first type, grandiflora (large flowered), is then subdivided by flower form; e.g. Begonia grandiflora erecta.

== Cultivation ==
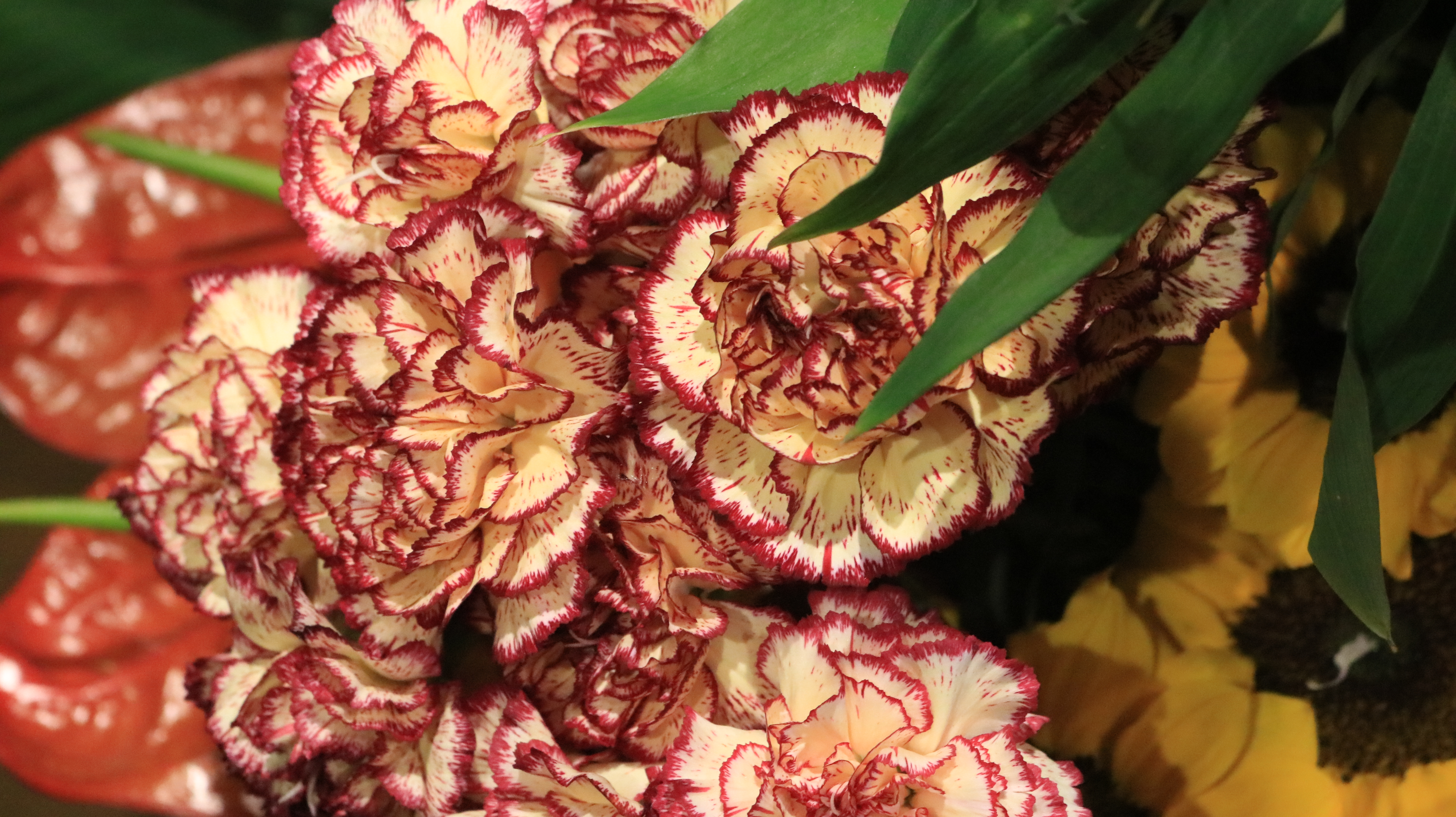
Light yellow and red Begonia tuberhybrida.

Light

Tuberous begonias grow best in partial shade or filtered sunlight. Excessive exposure to sunlight can result in burnt flowers and leaves. However, too much shade will result in compensatory growth of foliage at the expense of flowers.

Soil

Proper drainage is needed for the soil of Begonia tuberhybrida. Plant a Begonia in a pot with equal parts perlite and coarse sand. Sand consists of tiny spaces where air, water and nutrients can move freely.

Climate

These plants prefer cool temperatures.

== See also ==
- Tuberous begonia
