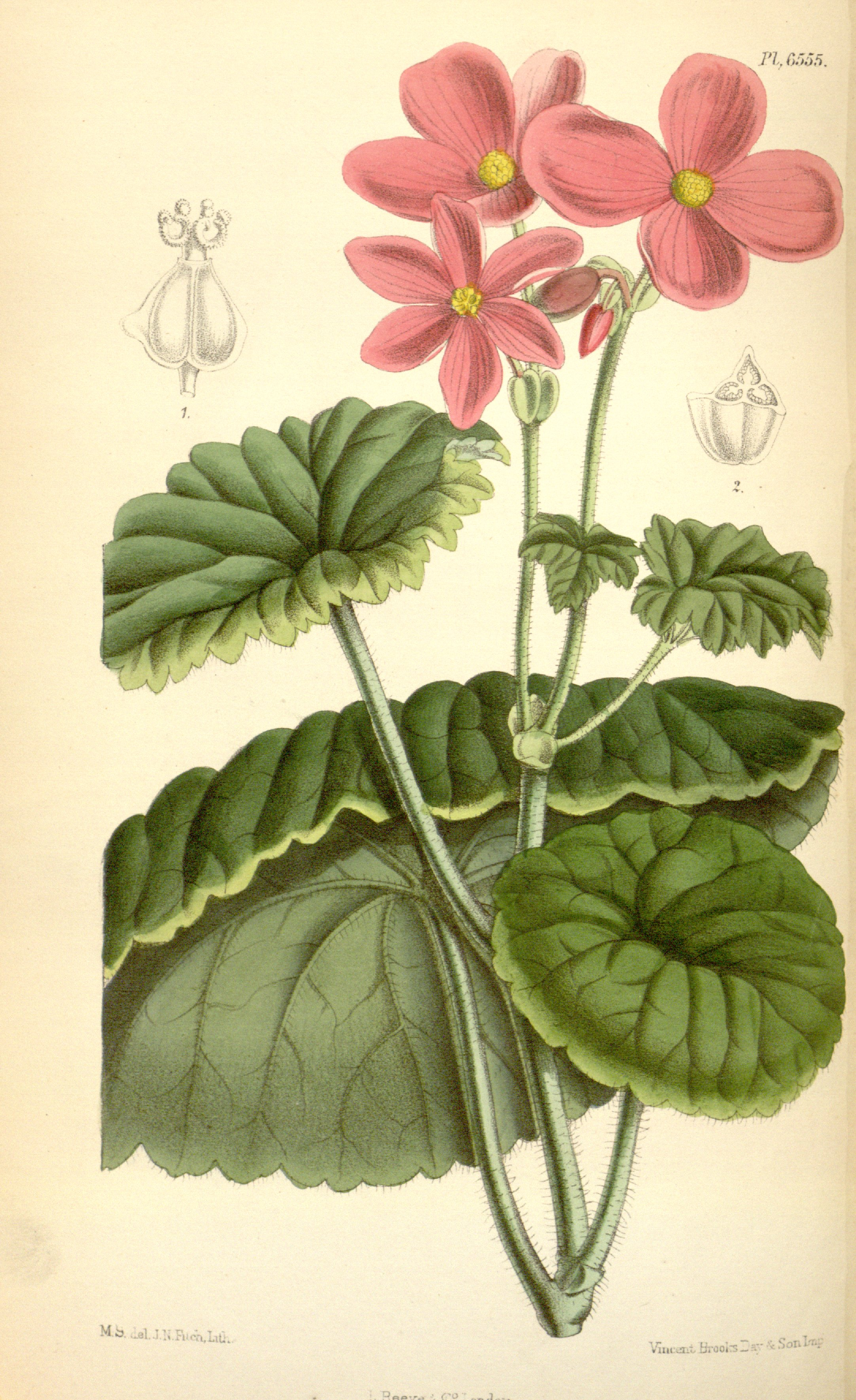

Conservation status
- Least Concern (IUCN 3.1)

Scientific classification
- Kingdom: Plantae
- Clade: Tracheophytes
- Clade: Angiosperms
- Clade: Eudicots
- Clade: Rosids
- Order: Cucurbitales
- Family: Begoniaceae
- Genus: Begonia
- Species: B. socotrana

Binomial name
- Begonia socotrana Hook.f.

= Begonia socotrana =

Species of flowering plant

Begonia socotrana is a species of plant in the family Begoniaceae. It is endemic to north-central Socotra. Its natural habitats are subtropical or tropical dry forests, subtropical or tropical dry shrubland, and rocky areas. Due to its winter-blooming tendency, it has been used in begonia hybridization efforts.
