= John Seden =

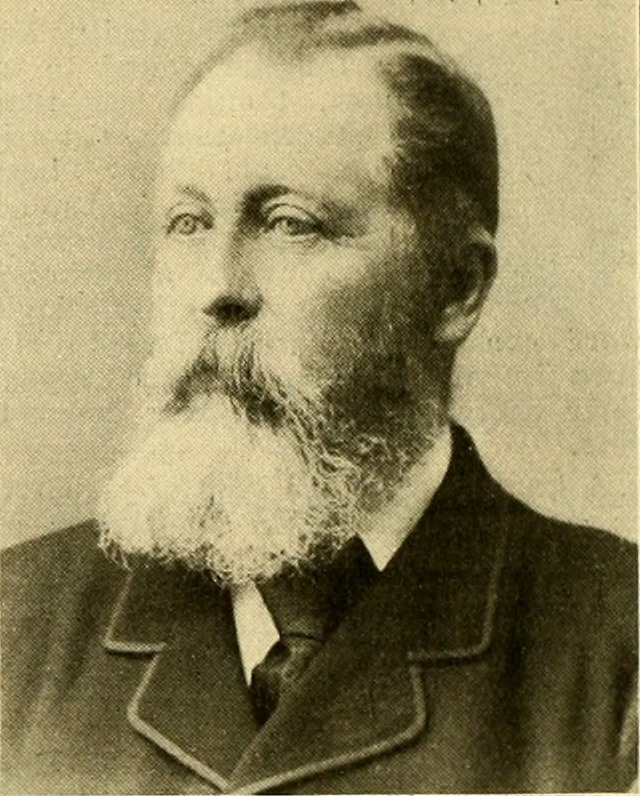
- Born: 1840; Dedham, Essex, England
- Died: 1921
- Scientific career
- Fields: Botany
- Institutions: Veitch Nurseries

John Seden (1840–1921) was a hybridist and horticulturist best known for the hybrids he created while in the employment of Veitch Nurseries. He was trained in hybridizing by John Dominy in 1861. In 1873 he began hybridizing tuberous begonias which in turn formed the basis from which modern garden begonias are derived.
