= List of Masdevallia species =

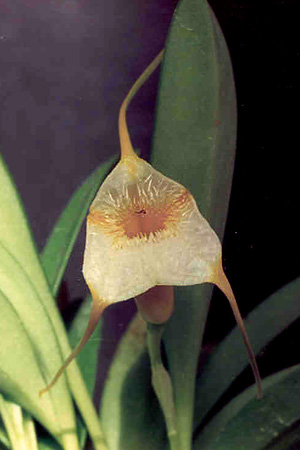
Masdevallia agaster

Masdevallia is a genus of orchids (Orchidaceae), containing about 500 species.

While several genera have been included in Masdevallia in the attempt to make it a natural monophyletic group, Jostia, Spilotantha and Teagueia have been split off in the process. Not all authors accept this decision at present, and the final consensus remains to be established on this matter.

== A ==
- Masdevallia acaroi (Ecuador)
- Masdevallia adamsii (Belize)
- Masdevallia adrianae (Ecuador)
- Masdevallia aenigma (Colombia)
- Masdevallia affinis (Venezuela to Ecuador)
- Masdevallia agaster (S Ecuador)
- Masdevallia aguirrei (Colombia)
- Masdevallia akemia (Colombia)
- Masdevallia albella (SE Ecuador to N Peru)
- Masdevallia alexandri (Ecuador)
- Masdevallia amabilis (Peru)
- Masdevallia amaluzae (Ecuador to Peru)
- Masdevallia ametroglossa (Ecuador)
- Masdevallia amoena (Ecuador)
- Masdevallia amplexa (Peru)
- Masdevallia ampullacea (S Ecuador)
- Masdevallia anachaeta (W South America)
- Masdevallia anchorifera (Costa Rica)
- Masdevallia andreettaeana (Ecuador)
- Masdevallia anemone (Ecuador)
- Masdevallia anfracta (Ecuador)
- Masdevallia angulata (S Colombia to Ecuador)
- Masdevallia angulifera (Colombia)
- Masdevallia anisomorpha (Colombia)
- Masdevallia anomala (Peru)
- Masdevallia antonii (Peru)
- Masdevallia aphanes (Ecuador to Peru)
- Masdevallia apparitio (Colombia)
- Masdevallia aptera Luer & L.O'Shaughn (Ecuador)
- Masdevallia arangoi (Colombia)
- Masdevallia ariasii (SE Ecuador to N Peru)
- Masdevallia arminii (Colombia)
- Masdevallia assurgens (Colombia)
- Masdevallia asterotricha (Peru)
- Masdevallia atahualpa (Peru)
- Masdevallia attenuata (Costa Rica to Ecuador)
- Masdevallia audax (Peru)
- Masdevallia aurea (Ecuador)
- Masdevallia aurorae (Peru)
- Masdevallia ayabacana (Peru)

== B ==
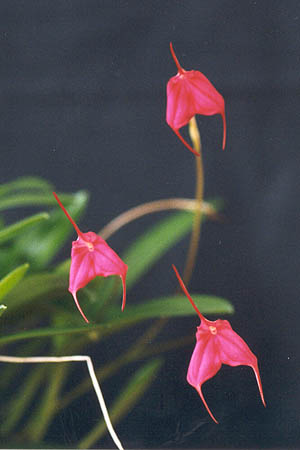
Masdevallia barlaeana

- Masdevallia bangii (Ecuador to Bolivia)
- Masdevallia barlaeana (Peru)
- Masdevallia barrowii (Ecuador)
- Masdevallia bathyschista (Colombia)
- Masdevallia belua (SE Ecuador)
- Masdevallia bennettii (Peru)
- Masdevallia berthae (Ecuador)
- Masdevallia bicolor (W South America to NW Venezuela)
- Masdevallia bicornis (SE Ecuador)
- Masdevallia blanda (Ecuador)
- Masdevallia boliviensis (Bolivia)
  - Masdevallia boliviensis ssp. boliviensis (Bolivia)
  - Masdevallia boliviensis ssp. leucophaea (Bolivia)
- Masdevallia bonplandii (E Colombia to C Peru)
- Masdevallia bottae (Ecuador)
- Masdevallia bourdetteana (Ecuador)
- Masdevallia brachyantha (Bolivia)
- Masdevallia brachyura (Ecuador)
- Masdevallia brenneri (Ecuador)
- Masdevallia brockmuelleri (Colombia)
- Masdevallia bryophila (Peru)
- Masdevallia buccinator (Colombia)
- Masdevallia bucculenta (NW Ecuador)
- Masdevallia burianii (Bolivia)
- Masdevallia burzlaffiana (Guatemala)

== C ==
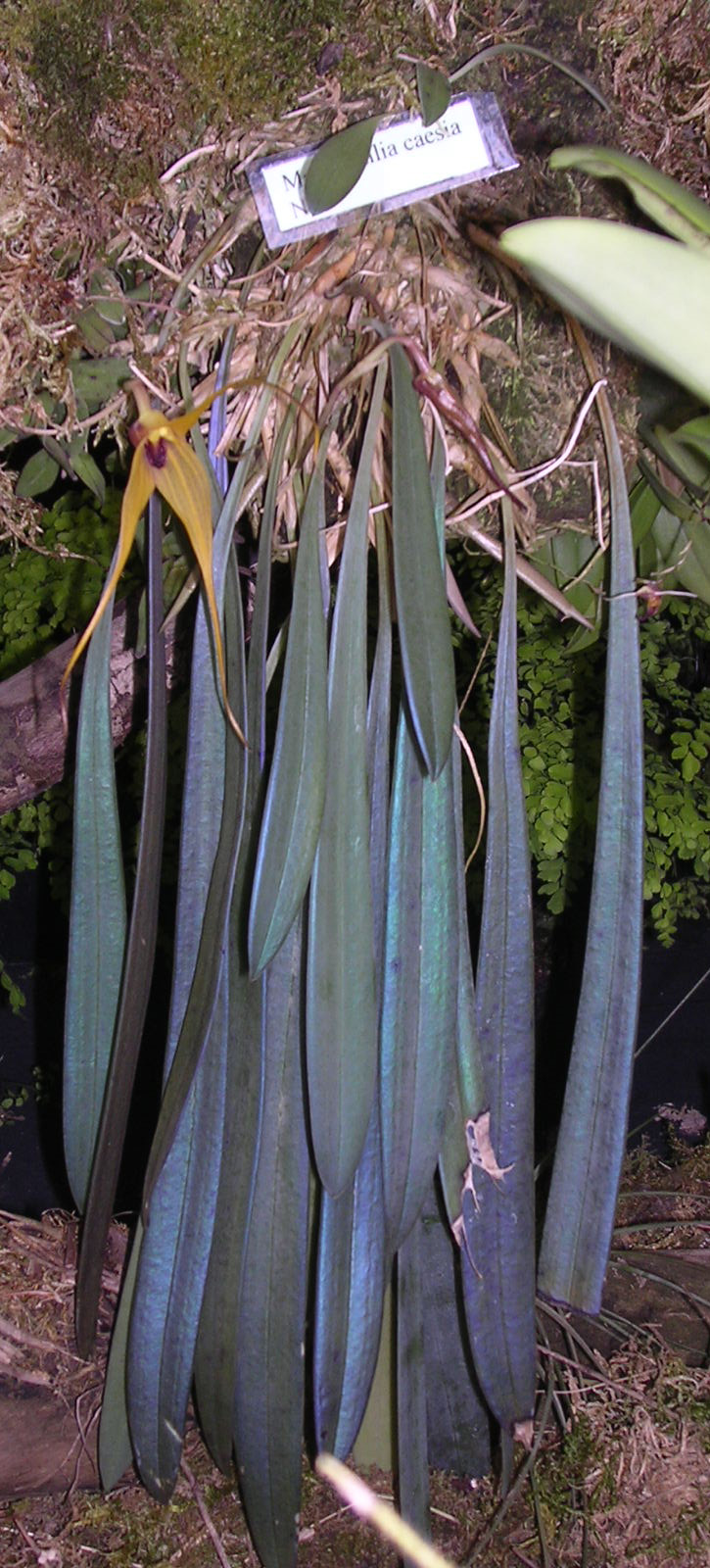
Masdevallia caesia

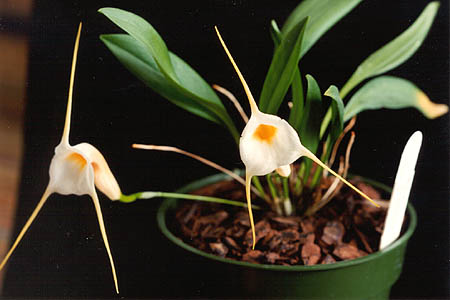
Masdevallia constricta

- Masdevallia cacodes (Colombia)
- Masdevallia caesia (W Colombia)
- Masdevallia calagrasalis (SE Ecuador)
- Masdevallia calocalix (Ecuador)
- Masdevallia calosiphon (Peru)
- Masdevallia calura (Costa Rica)
- Masdevallia campyloglossa (W South America)
- Masdevallia cardiantha (Peru)
- Masdevallia carmenensis (Ecuador)
- Masdevallia carnosa Königer (Peru)
- Masdevallia carpishica (Peru)
- Masdevallia carruthersiana (Colombia to SE Ecuador)
- Masdevallia castor (Peru)
- Masdevallia catapheres (Peru)
- Masdevallia caudata (Colombia to Venezuela)
- Masdevallia caudivolvula (Colombia)
- Masdevallia cerastes (Colombia)
- Masdevallia chaparensis (Bolivia)
- Masdevallia chasei (Costa Rica)
- Masdevallia chimboensis (Ecuador)
- Masdevallia chontalensis (C America)
- Masdevallia chuspipatae (Bolivia)
- Masdevallia cinnamomea (Peru)
- Masdevallia citrinella (Ecuador)
- Masdevallia civilis (Venezuela to Peru)
- Masdevallia clandestina (Colombia)
- Masdevallia cleistogama (Peru)
- Masdevallia cloesii (Peru)
- Masdevallia cocapatae (Bolivia)
- Masdevallia coccinea – Little Flags (Colombia)
- Masdevallia collantesii (Peru)
- Masdevallia collina (Panama)
- Masdevallia colossus (Peru)
- Masdevallia concinna (Peru)
- Masdevallia condorensis (SE Ecuador)
- Masdevallia constricta (Peru)
- Masdevallia copiosa (Colombia)
- Masdevallia cordeliana (Peru)
- Masdevallia corderoana (Ecuador)
- Masdevallia coriacea (Colombia to Ecuador
- Masdevallia corniculata (Colombia to E Ecuador)
- Masdevallia cosmia (Peru)
- Masdevallia cranion (Peru)
- Masdevallia crassicaudis (Ecuador)
- Masdevallia crescenticola (W Colombia to W Ecuador)
- Masdevallia cretata (Ecuador)
- Masdevallia cryptocopis (Costa Rica)
- Masdevallia cucullata – Widow Orchid (Colombia to Ecuador)
- Masdevallia cucutillensis (Colombia)
- Masdevallia cuprea (S Tropical America)
- Masdevallia cupularis (Costa Rica)
- Masdevallia curtipes (SE Brazil)
- Masdevallia cyclotega (Peru)
- Masdevallia cylix (Ecuador)

== D ==
- Masdevallia dalessandroi (S Ecuador)
- Masdevallia datura (Bolivia)
- Masdevallia davisii – Davis' masdevallia, Orchid of the Sun, qoriwaqanki (Quechua)
- Masdevallia deceptrix (Venezuela)
- Masdevallia decumana (S Ecuador to N Peru)
- Masdevallia deformis (SE Ecuador)
- Masdevallia delhierroi (EC Ecuador)
- Masdevallia demissa (Costa Rica)
- Masdevallia deniseana (Ecuador)
- Masdevallia descendens (SE Ecuador)
- Masdevallia discoidea (Brazil)
- Masdevallia discolor (Colombia)
- Masdevallia don-quijote (S Ecuador)
- Masdevallia dorisiae (Ecuador)
- Masdevallia draconis (Ecuador)
- Masdevallia dreisei (Ecuador)
- Masdevallia dryada (Colombia)
- Masdevallia dudleyi (Peru)
- Masdevallia dunstervillei (Venezuela)
- Masdevallia dura (Ecuador)
- Masdevallia dynastes (WC Ecuador)

== E ==
- Masdevallia eburnea (Panama)
- Masdevallia echo (Peru)
- Masdevallia ejiriana (Ecuador)
- Masdevallia elachys (Bolivia)
- Masdevallia elegans (Peru)
- Masdevallia elephanticeps (Colombia to NW Venezuela)
- Masdevallia empusa (SE Ecuador to C Peru)
- Masdevallia enallax (Costa Rica)
- Masdevallia encephala (Colombia)
- Masdevallia ensata (Colombia to NW Venezuela)
- Masdevallia ephelota (Peru)
- Masdevallia erinacea (Costa Rica to Ecuador)
- Masdevallia estradae (Colombia)
- Masdevallia eucharis (S Ecuador)
- Masdevallia eumeces (Peru)
- Masdevallia eumeliae (Peru)
- Masdevallia eurynogaster (SE Ecuador)
- Masdevallia excelsior (SE Ecuador)
- Masdevallia exilipes (Colombia)
- Masdevallia expers (SE Ecuador)
- Masdevallia exquisita (Bolivia)

== F ==
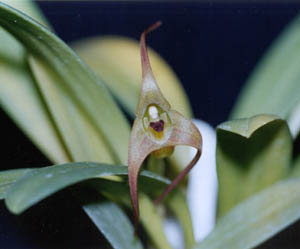
Masdevallia fractiflexa

- Masdevallia falcago (Colombia)
- Masdevallia fenestrellata Dalström & Ruíz Pérez (Peru)
- Masdevallia figueroae (S Ecuador)
- Masdevallia flaveola (Costa Rica)
- Masdevallia floribunda (Mexico to SC America)
- Masdevallia foetens (Colombia)
- Masdevallia formosa (Peru)
- Masdevallia fosterae (S America)
- Masdevallia fractiflexa (SE Ecuador)
- Masdevallia frilehmannii (Bolivia)
- Masdevallia fuchsii (Peru)
- Masdevallia fulvescens (Costa Rica to Colombia)

== G ==
- Masdevallia garciae (Venezuela)
- Masdevallia gargantua (Colombia)
- Masdevallia geminiflora (W Colombia to W Ecuador)
- Masdevallia gilbertoi (Colombia)
- Masdevallia glandulosa (S Ecuador to N Peru)
- Masdevallia glomerosa (S Ecuador)
- Masdevallia goliath (SE Ecuador to NE Peru)
- Masdevallia gloriae (Panama)
- Masdevallia gloriosa Dalström & Ruíz Pérez (Peru)
- Masdevallia goettfertiana Dalström & Ruíz Pérez (Peru)
- Masdevallia guayanensis (N South America to Brazil)
- Masdevallia guerrieroi (Ecuador)
- Masdevallia gutierrezii (Bolivia)
- Masdevallia guttulata (SE Ecuador)

== H ==
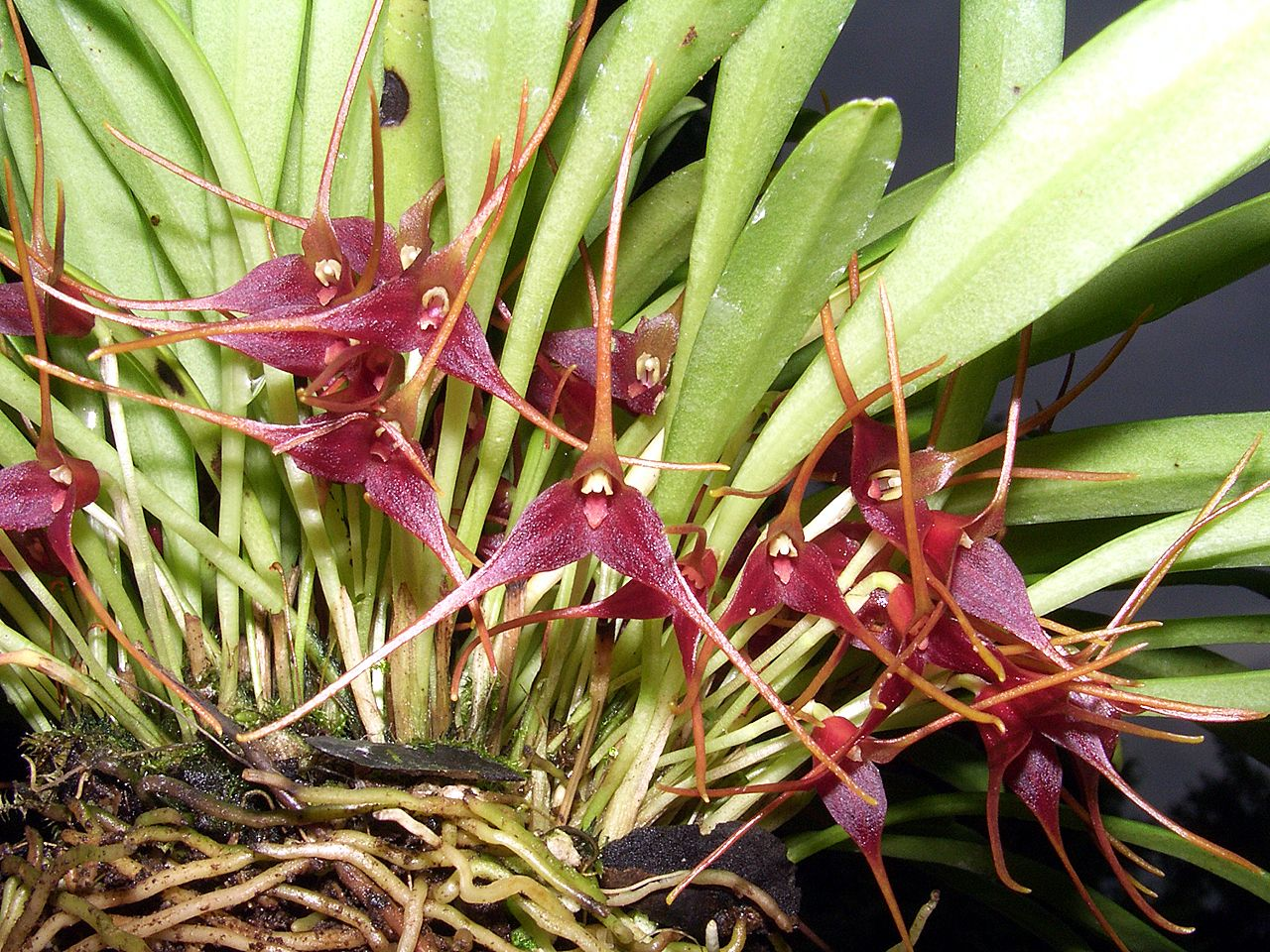
Masdevallia herradurae

- Masdevallia harlequina (Peru)
- Masdevallia hartmanii (Ecuador)
- Masdevallia heideri (Bolivia)
- Masdevallia helenae (Bolivia)
- Masdevallia henniae (S Ecuador)
- Masdevallia hercules (Ecuador)
- Masdevallia herradurae (Colombia)
- Masdevallia heteroptera (Colombia)
- Masdevallia hians (Colombia)
- Masdevallia hieroglyphica (Colombia)
- Masdevallia hirtzii (Ecuador)
- Masdevallia hoeijeri (SE Ecuador)
- Masdevallia hortensis (Colombia)
- Masdevallia hortilankesteriani Dalström & Ruíz Pérez (Peru)
- Masdevallia hubeinii (Colombia)
- Masdevallia hylodes (Colombia)
- Masdevallia hymenantha (Peru)
- Masdevallia hystrix (Ecuador)

== I ==
- Masdevallia icterina (N Peru)
- Masdevallia idae (Peru)
- Masdevallia ignea (Colombia)
- Masdevallia immensa (Peru)
- Masdevallia impostor (W Venezuela to SE Ecuador)
- Masdevallia indecora (Colombia)
- Masdevallia infracta (Brazil to Bolivia)
- Masdevallia ingridiana (Ecuador)
- Masdevallia instar (Ecuador to Peru)
- Masdevallia ionocharis – Graceful violet-blue masdevallia
- Masdevallia irapana (Venezuela)
- Masdevallia iris (Venezuela)
- Masdevallia ishikoi (Bolivia)
- Masdevallia isos (Bolivia)

== J ==
- Masdevallia jarae (Peru)
- Masdevallia josei (Ecuador)
- Masdevallia juan-albertoi (Peru)

== K ==
- Masdevallia kalbreyeri (Colombia)
- Masdevallia karelii Dalström & Ruíz Pérez (Peru)
- Masdevallia karineae (Peru)
- Masdevallia kuhnorum (Peru)
- Masdevallia kyphonantha (Venezuela)

== L ==
- Masdevallia laevis (Colombia to NW Venezuela)
- Masdevallia lamia (Ecuador)
- Masdevallia lamprotyria (S Ecuador to N Peru)
- Masdevallia lankesterana (Costa Rica)
- Masdevallia lansbergii (N Venezuela)
- Masdevallia lappifera (Ecuador)
- Masdevallia lata (Costa Rica)
- Masdevallia lauchiana (Costa Rica)
- Masdevallia lenae (Ecuador)
- Masdevallia leonardoi (Ecuador)
- Masdevallia leonii (Peru)
- Masdevallia leontoglossa (Colombia)
- Masdevallia lepida (Colombia)
- Masdevallia leucantha (Colombia to Ecuador)
- Masdevallia lewisii (Bolivia)
- Masdevallia ligiae (Colombia)
- Masdevallia lilacina (Peru)
- Masdevallia lilianae (N Peru)
- Masdevallia limax (Ecuador)
- Masdevallia lineolata (Peru)
- Masdevallia lintricula (S Ecuador to N Peru)
- Masdevallia livingstoneana (Costa Rica to Panama)
- Masdevallia loui (Ecuador)
- Masdevallia lucernula (Peru)
- Masdevallia ludibunda (Colombia)
- Masdevallia ludibundella (Colombia)
- Masdevallia luziaemariae (Bolivia)
- Masdevallia lychniphora (N Peru)
- Masdevallia lynniana Luer (Ecuador)

== M ==
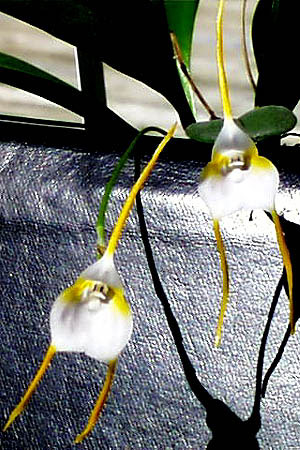
Masdevallia mejiana

- Masdevallia macrogenia (Colombia)
- Masdevallia macroglossa (NE Colombia to NW Venezuela)
- Masdevallia macropus (S Ecuador)
- Masdevallia macrura (Colombia)
- Masdevallia maculata (Colombia to Venezuela)
- Masdevallia maduroi (Panama)
- Masdevallia mallii (Ecuador)
- Masdevallia maloi (Ecuador)
- Masdevallia manchinazae (Ecuador)
- Masdevallia mandarina (Colombia)
- Masdevallia manningii (Peru)
- Masdevallia manoloi (Peru)
- Masdevallia manta (Ecuador)
- Masdevallia marginella (Costa Rica)
- Masdevallia marizae (Peru)
- Masdevallia marthae (Colombia)
- Masdevallia martineae (Bolivia)
- Masdevallia martiniana (Ecuador)
- Masdevallia mascarata (Bolivia)
- Masdevallia mastodon (Colombia)
- Masdevallia mataxa (Ecuador)
- Masdevallia maxilimax (Ecuador)
- Masdevallia mayaycu (Ecuador)
- Masdevallia medinae (Ecuador)
- Masdevallia medusa (Colombia)
- Masdevallia mejiana (Colombia)
- Masdevallia melanoglossa (Ecuador)
- Masdevallia melanoxantha (Colombia)
- Masdevallia meleagris (Colombia)
- Masdevallia menatoi (Bolivia)
- Masdevallia mendozae (Ecuador)
- Masdevallia mentosa (Ecuador)
- Masdevallia merinoi (Ecuador)
- Masdevallia mezae (Peru)
- Masdevallia microptera (N Peru)
- Masdevallia midas (Ecuador)
- Masdevallia milagroi (Ecuador)
- Masdevallia minuta (S Tropical America)
- Masdevallia misasii (Colombia)
- Masdevallia molossoides (Costa Rica)
- Masdevallia molossus (Colombia)
- Masdevallia monicana (Ecuador)
- Masdevallia monogona (Peru)
- Masdevallia mooreana (Colombia)
- Masdevallia morochoi (SE Ecuador)
- Masdevallia murex (Ecuador)
- Masdevallia mutica (Colombia)
- Masdevallia mystica (Colombia)

== N ==
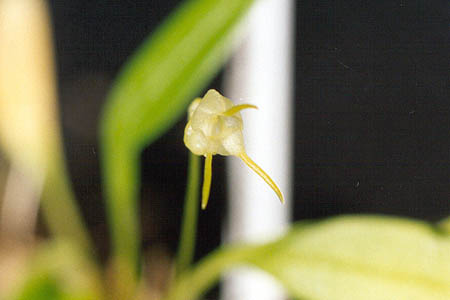
Masdevallia nidifica

- Masdevallia naranjapatae (Ecuador)
- Masdevallia navicularis (NW Venezuela)
- Masdevallia nebulina (Bolivia)
- Masdevallia newmaniana (Ecuador)
- Masdevallia nicaraguae (Nicaragua)
- Masdevallia nidifica (C America to N Peru)
- Masdevallia niesseniae Luer (Colombia)
- Masdevallia nikoleana (S Ecuador to N Peru)
- Masdevallia nitens (Bolivia)
- Masdevallia nivea (Colombia)
- Masdevallia norae (N South America)
- Masdevallia norops (E Ecuador to N Peru)
- Masdevallia notosibirica (Bolivia)

== O ==
- Masdevallia obscurans (Brazil: Pernambuco)
- Masdevallia odontocera (Colombia)
- Masdevallia odontopetala (Ecuador)
- Masdevallia omorenoi (Bolivia)
- Masdevallia ophioglossa (W Ecuador)
  - Masdevallia ophioglossa ssp. grossa
  - Masdevallia ophioglossa ssp. ophioglossa
- Masdevallia orchipayanensium P. Ortiz (Colombia)
- Masdevallia oreas (Bolivia)
- Masdevallia ortalis (Ecuador)
- Masdevallia os-draconis (Colombia)
- Masdevallia os-viperae (Ecuador)
- Masdevallia oscarii (Colombia)
- Masdevallia oscitans (Brazil)
- Masdevallia ostaurina Luer & V.N.M.Rao (Panama)
- Masdevallia oxapampaensis (Peru)

== P ==
- Masdevallia pachyantha (Colombia)
- Masdevallia pachygyne (Colombia)
- Masdevallia pachysepala (Colombia)
- Masdevallia paivaeana (Peru to Bolivia)
- Masdevallia pandurilabia (Peru)
- Masdevallia panguiensis (SE Ecuador)
- Masdevallia pantomima (Ecuador)
- Masdevallia papillosa (Ecuador)
- Masdevallia paquishae (SE Ecuador to Peru)
- Masdevallia pardina (S Colombia to N Ecuador)
- Masdevallia parvula (W South America)
- Masdevallia pastinata (Colombia)
- Masdevallia patchicutzae (SE Ecuador)
- Masdevallia patriciana (Ecuador)
- Masdevallia patula (Ecuador)
- Masdevallia paulensis (SE Brazil)
- Masdevallia peristeria (Colombia to NW Ecuador)
  - Masdevallia peristeria ssp. haematosticta (Colombia to NW Ecuador)
  - Masdevallia peristeria ssp. peristeria (NW Colombia)
- Masdevallia pernix (N Peru)
- Masdevallia persicina (Ecuador)
- Masdevallia pescadoensis (Colombia)
- Masdevallia phacopsis (Bolivia)
- Masdevallia phasmatodes (N Peru)
- Masdevallia phlogina (Peru)
- Masdevallia phoenix (Peru)
- Masdevallia picea (Peru)
- Masdevallia picta (SE Ecuador to N Peru)
- Masdevallia picturata (C & S Tropical America)
- Masdevallia pileata (Colombia)
- Masdevallia pinocchio (Ecuador)
- Masdevallia planadensis (Colombia)
- Masdevallia plantaginea (SE Ecuador to NC Peru)
- Masdevallia platyglossa (Colombia to Ecuador)
- Masdevallia pleurothalloides (Panama)
- Masdevallia plynophora (Peru)
- Masdevallia pollux (Ecuador to Peru)
- Masdevallia polychroma (Ecuador)
  - Masdevallia polysticta ssp. polysticta
  - Masdevallia polysticta ssp. spathulifolia
- Masdevallia popowiana (Peru)
- Masdevallia portillae (Ecuador)
- Masdevallia posadae (Colombia)
- Masdevallia princeps (Peru)
- Masdevallia proboscoidea Luer & V.N.M.Rao (Ecuador)
- Masdevallia prodigiosa (N Peru)
- Masdevallia prolixa (Peru)
- Masdevallia prosartema (N Peru)
- Masdevallia pterygiophora (Colombia)
- Masdevallia pumila (S Colombia to C Bolivia)
- Masdevallia purpurella (Colombia)
- Masdevallia purpurina (Peru)
- Masdevallia pygmaea (Costa Rica to NW Ecuador)
- Masdevallia pyknosepala (Peru)
- Masdevallia pyxis (Peru)

== Q ==
- Masdevallia quasimodo (Bolivia)

== R ==
- Masdevallia racemosa (Colombia)
- Masdevallia rana-aurea (Peru)
- Masdevallia receptrix (Bolivia)
- Masdevallia recurvata (Peru)
- Masdevallia regina (Peru)
- Masdevallia reichenbachiana (Costa Rica)
- Masdevallia renzii (Colombia)
- Masdevallia repanda (Ecuador)
- Masdevallia replicata (Peru)
- Masdevallia revoluta (Ecuador)
- Masdevallia rhinophora (Colombia)
- Masdevallia rhodehameliana (Peru)
- Masdevallia richardsoniana (Peru)
- Masdevallia ricii (Bolivia)
- Masdevallia rigens (Peru)
- Masdevallia rimarima-alba (Peru)
- Masdevallia robineae Dalström & Ruíz Pérez (Peru)
- Masdevallia robusta (Ecuador)
- Masdevallia rodolfoi (Peru)
- Masdevallia rolandorum (Peru)
- Masdevallia rolfeana – "black orchid" (Costa Rica)
- Masdevallia rosea (S Colombia to Ecuador)
  - Masdevallia rosea ssp. echinata (S Colombia to N Ecuador)
  - Masdevallia rosea ssp. rosea (EC & SE Ecuador)
- Masdevallia roseogena Dalström & Ruíz Pérez (Peru)
- Masdevallia roseola (SE Ecuador to N Peru)
- Masdevallia rubeola (Bolivia)
- Masdevallia rubiginosa (SE Ecuador to N Peru)
- Masdevallia rugosilabia Dalström & Ruíz Pérez (Peru)
- Masdevallia rufescens (S Ecuador to N Peru)
- Masdevallia rugulosa Königer (Peru)

== S ==
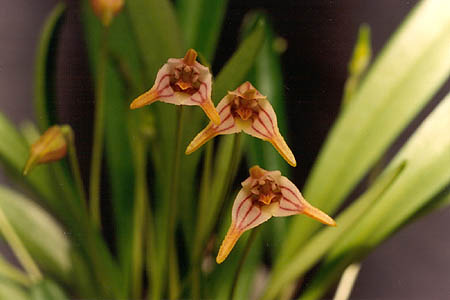
Masdevallia striatella

- Masdevallia saltatrix (Colombia)
- Masdevallia sanchezii (Ecuador)
- Masdevallia sanctae-fidei (Colombia to Venezuela)
- Masdevallia sanctae-inesae (Ecuador)
- Masdevallia sanguinea (Ecuador)
- Masdevallia scabrilinguis (Costa Rica to Panama)
- Masdevallia scalpellifera (Ecuador)
- Masdevallia scandens (Bolivia)
- Masdevallia scapha (Venezuela)
- Masdevallia sceptrum (NE Colombia to NW & N Venezuela)
- Masdevallia schildhaueri (Venezuela)
- Masdevallia schizantha (Colombia)
- Masdevallia schizopetala (Costa Rica, Bolivia)
- Masdevallia schizostigma (Peru)
- Masdevallia schlimii (Colombia to NW Venezuela)
- Masdevallia schmidt-mummii (Colombia)
- Masdevallia schoonenii (Peru)
- Masdevallia schroederae (C America)
- Masdevallia schroederiana (Costa Rica)
- Masdevallia schudelii (Ecuador)
- Masdevallia scitula (Peru)
- Masdevallia scobina (Colombia)
- Masdevallia scopaea (Bolivia)
- Masdevallia segurae (Colombia)
- Masdevallia selenites (Peru)
- Masdevallia semiteres (Peru)
- Masdevallia senghasiana (Colombia)
- Masdevallia serendipita (Bolivia)
- Masdevallia sernae (Colombia)
- Masdevallia sessilis (SE Brazil)
- Masdevallia setacea (Ecuador)
- Masdevallia setipes (Bolivia)
- Masdevallia shiraishii (Peru)
- Masdevallia siphonantha (Colombia)
- Masdevallia smallmaniana (Ecuador)
- Masdevallia soennemarkii (Bolivia)
- Masdevallia solomonii (Bolivia)
- Masdevallia speciosa (Ecuador)
- Masdevallia spilantha (N Peru)
- Masdevallia splendida (Peru)
- Masdevallia sprucei (S Venezuela to N Brazil)
- Masdevallia stenorhynchos (Colombia)
- Masdevallia stigii (Ecuador)
- Masdevallia stirpis (Venezuela)
- Masdevallia strattoniana (Ecuador)
- Masdevallia striatella (Costa Rica to NW Venezuela)
- Masdevallia strobelii (SE Ecuador)
- Masdevallia strumella (Colombia)
- Masdevallia strumifera (Colombia to NW Venezuela and N Ecuador)
- Masdevallia stumpflei (Peru)
- Masdevallia suinii (Ecuador)
- Masdevallia sulphurella (Peru)
- Masdevallia sumapazensis (Colombia)
- Masdevallia synthesis (Venezuela)

== T ==
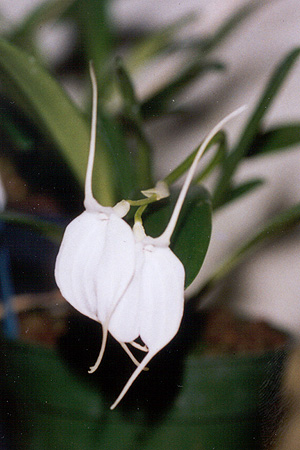
Masdevallia tovarensis

- Masdevallia tatianae Dalström & Ruíz Pérez (Peru)
- Masdevallia teaguei (Colombia to Ecuador)
- Masdevallia terborchii (Peru)
- Masdevallia theleura (Ecuador)
- Masdevallia thienii (Costa Rica to NW Ecuador)
- Masdevallia tinekeae (Bolivia)
- Masdevallia titan (Peru)
- Masdevallia tokachiorum (Panama)
- Masdevallia tonduzii (Costa Rica)
- Masdevallia torta (Colombia)
- Masdevallia tovarensis (N Venezuela)
- Masdevallia trautmanniana (Ecuador)
- Masdevallia triangularis (Venezuela to Ecuador)
- Masdevallia tricallosa (Peru)
- Masdevallia tricolor (N Venezuela)
- Masdevallia tricycla (Ecuador)
- Masdevallia trifurcata (SE Ecuador)
- Masdevallia trigonopetala (S Colombia to E Ecuador)
- Masdevallia trochilus (C Colombia to C Peru)
- Masdevallia truncata (Ecuador)
- Masdevallia tsubotae (Colombia)
- Masdevallia tubata (Bolivia)
- Masdevallia tubuliflora (Chiapas to C America)
- Masdevallia tubulosa (W South America to NW Venezuela)
  - Masdevallia tubulosa subsp. syringodes (S Ecuador to N Peru)
  - Masdevallia tubulosa subsp. tubulosa (Colombia to NW Venezuela)
- Masdevallia tuerckheimii (Chiapas to C America)

== U ==
- Masdevallia uncifera (S Colombia to N Ecuador)
- Masdevallia unguentum (Colombia)
- Masdevallia uniflora (Peru)
- Masdevallia urceolaris (Colombia)
- Masdevallia ustulata (E Colombia to N Peru)
- Masdevallia utriculata (Panama)

== V ==
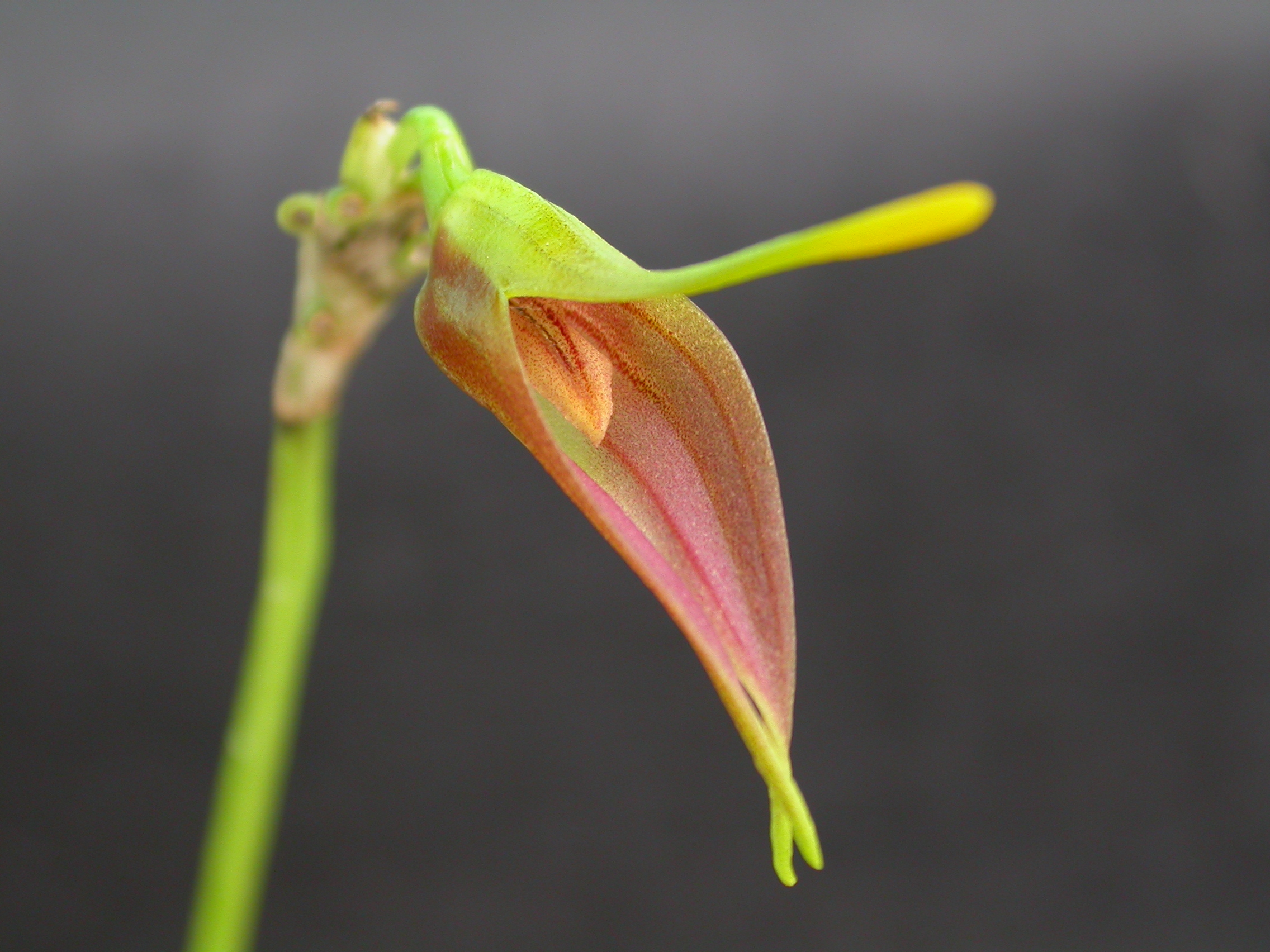
Masdevallia vargasii

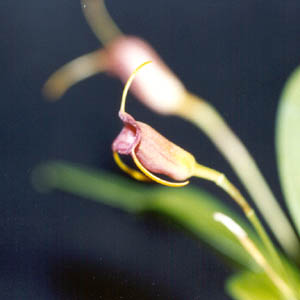
Masdevallia ventricularia

- Masdevallia valenciae (Colombia)
- Masdevallia vargasii (S Colombia to C Bolivia and N Brazil)
- Masdevallia vasquezii (Bolivia)
- Masdevallia veitchiana – Veitch's masdevallia, King of the Masdevallias, gallo-gallo (Spanish), waqanki (Quechua)
- Masdevallia velella (Colombia)
- Masdevallia velifera (Colombia)
- Masdevallia venatoria (Ecuador)
- Masdevallia venezuelana (Venezuela)
- Masdevallia ventricularia (Colombia to NW Ecuador)
- Masdevallia venus (Ecuador)
- Masdevallia verecunda (Venezuela)
- Masdevallia vexillifera (Peru)
- Masdevallia vidua (Ecuador)
- Masdevallia vieirana (Colombia)
- Masdevallia villegasii (Colombia)
- Masdevallia virens (Ecuador)
- Masdevallia virgo-cuencae (Ecuador)
- Masdevallia virgo-rosea (Colombia)
- Masdevallia vomeris (Peru)

== W ==
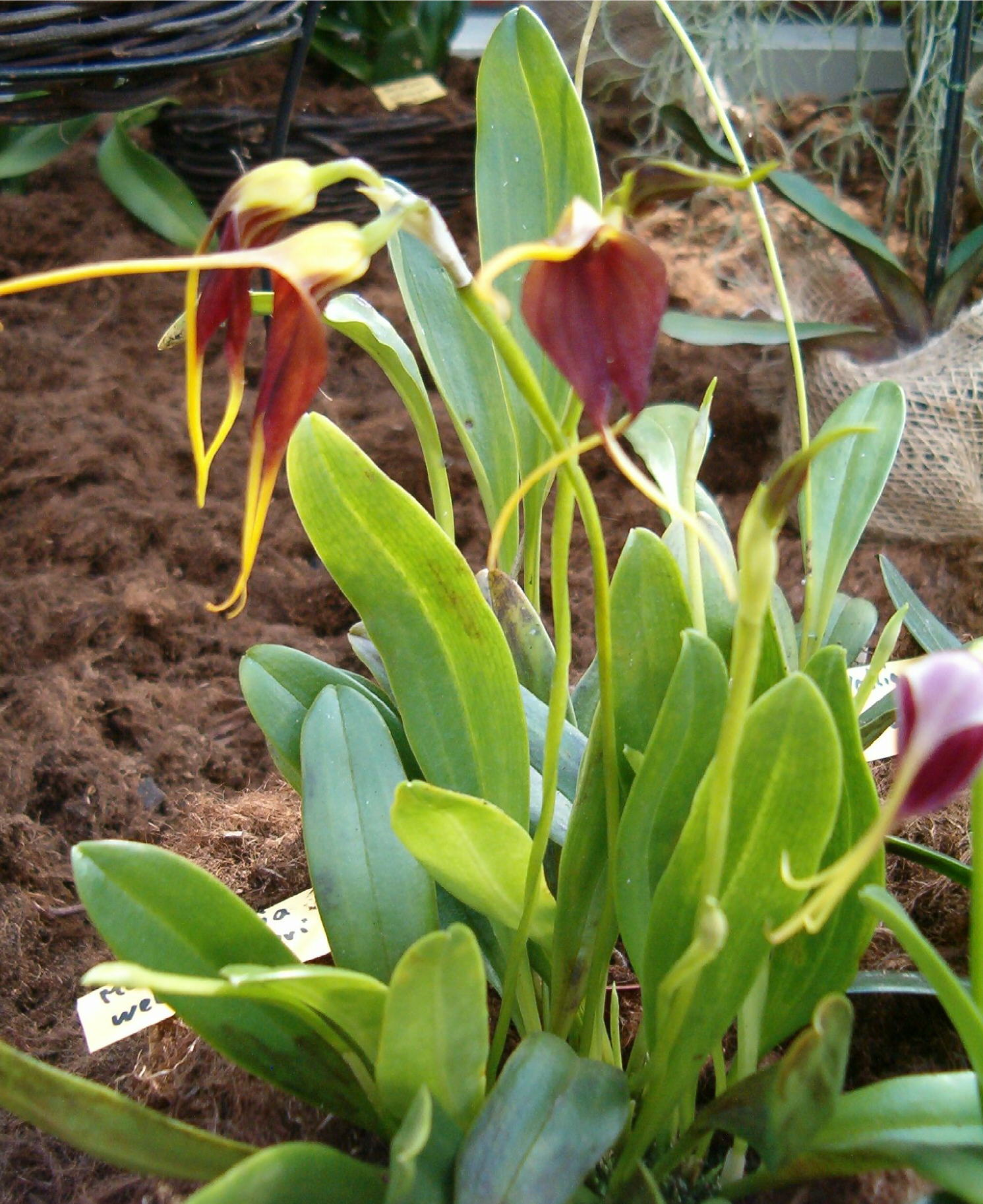
Masdevallia weberbaueri

- Masdevallia wagneriana (Colombia to N Venezuela)
  - Masdevallia wagneriana var. colombiana (Colombia)
  - Masdevallia wagneriana var. pteroglossa (Colombia)
  - Masdevallia wagneriana var. wagneriana (N Venezuela)
- Masdevallia walteri (Costa Rica)
- Masdevallia weberbaueri (S Ecuador to N Peru)
- Masdevallia welischii (Peru)
- Masdevallia wendlandiana (S Tropical America)
- Masdevallia whiteana (SE Ecuador to N Peru)
- Masdevallia wubbenii (Venezuela)
- Masdevallia wuelfinghoffiana (Ecuador)
- Masdevallia wuellneri P.Ortiz (Colombia)
- Masdevallia wuerstlei (Colombia)
- Masdevallia wurdackii (N Peru)

== X ==
- Masdevallia xanthina (Colombia to Ecuador)
  - Masdevallia xanthina ssp. klabochorum (Colombia to Ecuador)
  - Masdevallia xanthina ssp. pallida (Ecuador)
  - Masdevallia xanthina ssp. xanthina (Colombia to Ecuador)
- Masdevallia ximenae (Ecuador)
- Masdevallia xiphium (Colombia)
- Masdevallia xylina (Colombia)

== Y ==
- Masdevallia yungasensis (Bolivia)
  - Masdevallia yungasensis ssp. calocodon
  - Masdevallia yungasensis ssp. yungasensis

== Z ==
- Masdevallia zahlbruckneri (C America to W Ecuador)
- Masdevallia zamorensis (Ecuador)
- Masdevallia zapatae (Colombia)
- Masdevallia zebracea (N Peru)
- Masdevallia zongoensis (Bolivia)
- Masdevallia zumbae (Ecuador)
- Masdevallia zumbuehlerae (Ecuador)
