= Muisca (disambiguation) =

The Muisca are an indigenous people in Colombia.

Muisca may also refer to:

- Muisca Confederations, the former chiefdoms formed by the Muisca
- Chibcha language, the language of the Muisca, also called "Muisca", "Mosca" or "Muysccubun"
- Muisca (beetle), a checkered beetle genus
- Alabagrus muisca, a species of wasp of the genus Alabagrus
- Atelopus muisca, a species of toad of the genus Atelopus
- Brachygasterina muisca, a species of fly of the genus Brachygasterina
- Euryomma muisca, a species of fly of the genus Euryomma
