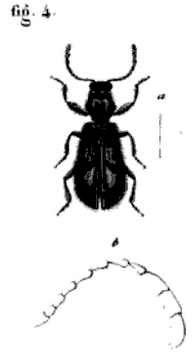
- Muisca bitaeniata

Scientific classification
- Kingdom: Animalia
- Phylum: Arthropoda
- Class: Insecta
- Order: Coleoptera
- Suborder: Polyphaga
- Infraorder: Cucujiformia
- Family: Cleridae
- Genus: Muisca
- Species: M. bitaeniata

Binomial name
- Muisca bitaeniata Spinola, 1844

= Muisca bitaeniata =

Species of beetle

Muisca bitaeniata is the accepted type species of checkered beetles of the genus Muisca in the subfamily of Clerinae or Enopliinae. It was first described by entomologist Maximilian Spinola in 1844.

== Etymology ==
The genus Muisca has been named after the Muisca from the Altiplano Cundiboyacense in central Colombia. Bitaeniata means "two-striped".

== Description ==
The description of the beetle is made in French and Spinola used for measuring the body parts of the sole specimen, which he thinks was a male, the old French unit of length ligne. One ligne corresponds to 2.2558291 millimetres (0.08881217 in).

The labium and maxilla of the genus Muisca are less wide than long. This differs from the genus Aulicus.

Antennas, body and legs are red. Eyes and extremities of the mandibles are black. Two black stripes over each elytra (forewing).

- body length - 3 1/2 ligne ~ 8 mm (0.31 in)
- prothorax - 2/3 ligne long, maximum 1/2 ligne wide ~ 1.5 mm (0.059 in) long, max 1.1 mm (0.043 in) wide
- elytra - 2 ligne long, base 1 ligne wide ~ 4.5 mm (0.18 in) long, base 2.2 mm (0.087 in) wide
- head - 1/2 ligne wide ~ 1.1 mm (0.043 in)

== See also ==
- List of flora and fauna named after the Muisca
