= Musca (disambiguation) =

Musca (The Fly, Musca Australis, Southern Fly) is a small constellation in the deep southern sky.

Musca may also refer to:

== People ==
- Tom Musca (born 1951), American filmmaker
- Xavier Musca (born 1960), French economist
- Mona Muscă (born 1949), Romanian philologist and politician

== Places ==
- Musca Borealis (Northern Fly), first described as "Musca" (The Fly), an asterism and obsolete constellation in the northern sky
- Mușca, a village in Lupșa, Alba County, Romania

== Other uses ==
- Musca, a 2021 album by music artist Herbert
- Musca (fly), a genus of flies
- Viberti Musca 1, the "Musca 1", an Italian airplane produced by Ali Verberti SpA
- The United States–Mexico–Canada Agreement, sometimes referred to as the Mexico–United States–Canada Agreement (MUSCA), an international trade agreement also known as NAFTA 2.0

== See also ==
- Fly (disambiguation) (Latin: musca, lit. 'fly', the insect)
- Musco
- Musci
- Musc (disambiguation)
- Muisca (disambiguation)
