= Neocorynura =

Scientific classification
- Domain: Eukaryota
- Kingdom: Animalia
- Phylum: Arthropoda
- Class: Insecta
- Order: Hymenoptera
- Family: Halictidae
- Tribe: Augochlorini
- Genus: Neocorynura; Schrottky, 1879

Genus of bees

Neocorynura is a genus of bees belonging to the family Halictidae.

The species of this genus are found in South America.

Species:

- Neocorynura aenigma (Gribodo, 1894)
- Neocorynura atromarginata (Cockerell, 1901)
- Neocorynura autrani (Vachal, 1904)
- Neocorynura azyx (Vachal, 1904)
- Neocorynura banarae (Ducke, 1906)
- Neocorynura brachycera (Moure, 1960)
- Neocorynura caligans (Vachal, 1904)
- Neocorynura centroamericana Smith-Pardo, 2005
- Neocorynura cercops (Vachal, 1904)
- Neocorynura chapadicola (Cockerell, 1901)
- Neocorynura chrysops (Vachal, 1904)
- Neocorynura cicur (Vachal, 1904)
- Neocorynura claviventris (Dalla Torre, 1896)
- Neocorynura codion (Vachal, 1904)
- Neocorynura colombiana Eickwort, 1979
- Neocorynura cribrita Smith-Pardo, 2005
- Neocorynura cuprifrons (Smith, 1879)
- Neocorynura cyaneon (Vachal, 1904)
- Neocorynura dilutipes (Vachal, 1904)
- Neocorynura diploon (Vachal, 1904)
- Neocorynura discolor (Smith, 1879)
- Neocorynura discolorata Smith-Pardo, 2005
- Neocorynura dittachos (Vachal, 1904)
- Neocorynura electra Engel, 1995
- Neocorynura erinnys (Schrottky, 1910)
- Neocorynura euadne (Schrottky, 1909)
- Neocorynura fumipennis (Friese, 1917)
- Neocorynura fuscipes (Packard, 1869)
- Neocorynura gaucha
- Neocorynura guarani
- Neocorynura guatemalensis Smith-Pardo
- Neocorynura hemidiodiae (Ducke, 1906)
- Neocorynura icosi (Vachal, 1904)
- Neocorynura iguaquensis Smith-Pardo & Gonzalez, 2006
- Neocorynura iopodion (Vachal, 1904)
- Neocorynura lampter (Vachal, 1904)
- Neocorynura lasipion (Vachal, 1904)
- Neocorynura lepidodes (Vachal, 1904)
- Neocorynura lignys (Vachal, 1904)
- Neocorynura marginans (Vachal, 1904)
- Neocorynura melamptera Moure, 1943
- Neocorynura miae
- Neocorynura minae Smith-Pardo
- Neocorynura monozona (Friese, 1917)
- Neocorynura muiscae Smith-Pardo & Gonzalez, 2006
- Neocorynura nean (Vachal, 1904)
- Neocorynura nictans (Vachal, 1904)
- Neocorynura nigroaenea (Packard, 1869)
- Neocorynura norops (Vachal, 1904)
- Neocorynura nossax (Vachal, 1904)
- Neocorynura notoplex (Vachal, 1904)
- Neocorynura nuda Michener, 1954
- Neocorynura oiospermi (Schrottky, 1909)
- Neocorynura panamensis Engel, 1997
- Neocorynura papallactensis Engel, 1999
- Neocorynura peruvicola (Strand, 1911)
- Neocorynura pleurites (Vachal, 1904)
- Neocorynura polybioides (Ducke, 1906)
- Neocorynura pseudobaccha (Cockerell, 1901)
- Neocorynura pubescens (Friese, 1917)
- Neocorynura pycnon (Vachal, 1904)
- Neocorynura pyrrhothrix (Vachal, 1904)
- Neocorynura rhytis (Vachal, 1904)
- Neocorynura riverai (Vachal, 1904)
- Neocorynura roxane (Schrottky, 1909)
- Neocorynura rubida Smith-Pardo, 2005
- Neocorynura rufa Michener, 1954
- Neocorynura rutilans (Vachal, 1904)
- Neocorynura sequax (Vachal, 1904)
- Neocorynura sophia
- Neocorynura spizion (Vachal, 1904)
- Neocorynura squamans (Vachal, 1904)
- Neocorynura stilborhin (Vachal, 1904)
- Neocorynura sulfurea Engel, 1997
- Neocorynura tangophyla
- Neocorynura tarpeia (Smith, 1853)
- Neocorynura tica Smith-Pardo, 2006
- Neocorynura trachycera (Vachal, 1904)
- Neocorynura triacontas (Vachal, 1904)
- Neocorynura unicincta (Friese, 1917)
- Neocorynura villosissima Michener, 1954
