= Gyalideopsis chicaque =

Scientific classification
- Kingdom: Fungi
- Division: Ascomycota
- Class: Lecanoromycetes
- Order: Graphidales
- Family: Gomphillaceae
- Genus: Gyalideopsis
- Species: G. chicaque

Binomial name
- Gyalideopsis chicaque Moncada & Lücking (2011)

Species of lichen

Gyalideopsis chicaque is a species of lichen in the family Gomphillaceae. Found at an altitude of 2,300 metres (7,500 ft) in the Eastern Ranges of the Andes in Colombia, it was described as new to science by Bibiana Moncada and Robert Lücking in 2011.

== Habitat and etymology ==
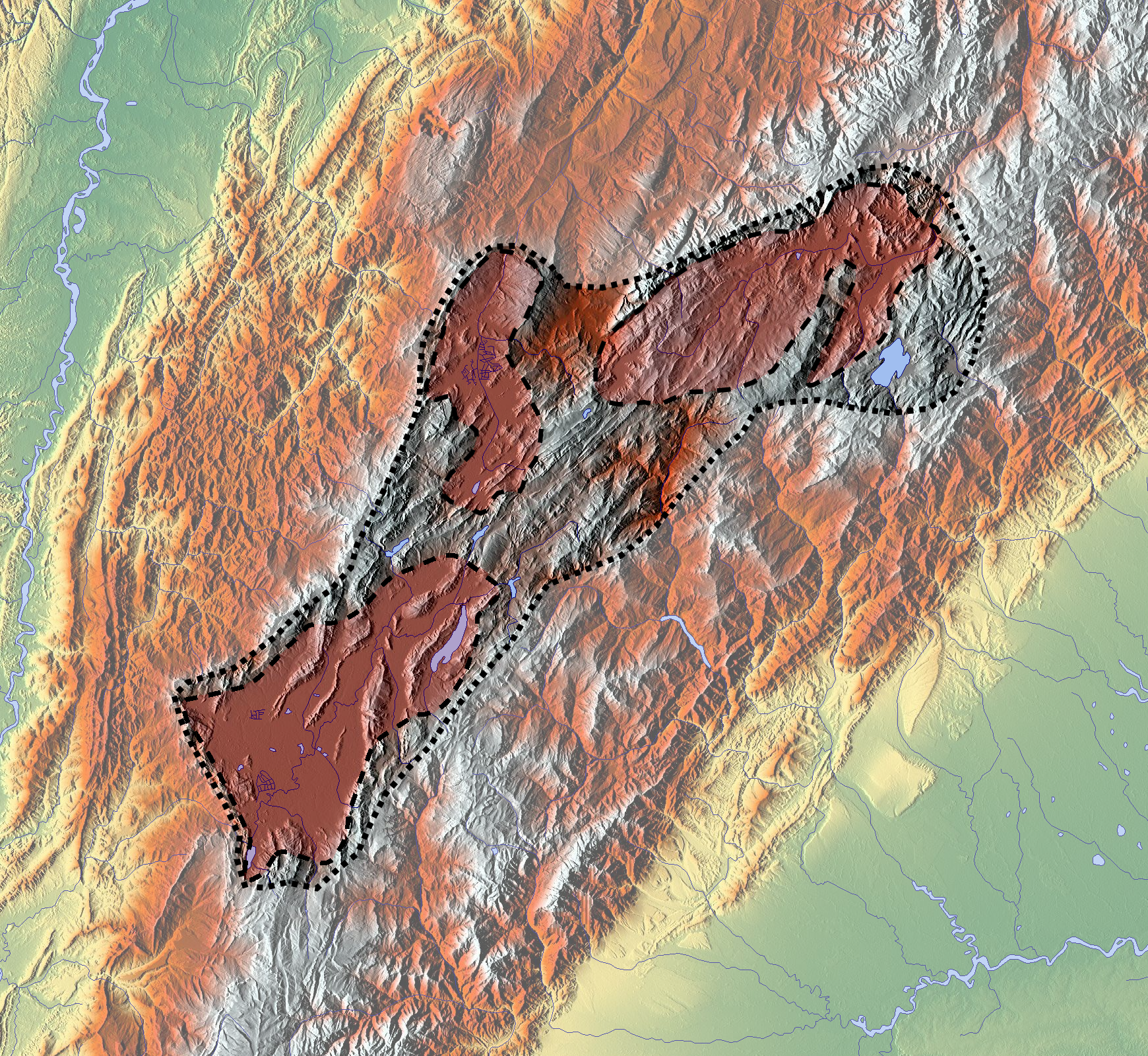
Type locality of Gyalideopsis chicaque

The lichen is only known from a single but well-developed collection found in a montane rainforest over compacted soil in Chicaque Natural Park, Altiplano Cundiboyacense in San Antonio del Tequendama, Cundinamarca, and the species epithet refers to the type locality. The park is located at 30 minutes from the Colombian capital Bogotá. Chicaque comes from Muysccubun, the language of the indigenous Muisca who inhabited the area before the Spanish conquest and means "our struggle".

== Description ==
Gyalideopsis chicaque is characterized by its small, broadly sessile, dark-brown apothecia lacking pruina and very small, submuriform ascospores. There are no similar species growing on rock or soil.

== See also ==
- List of flora and fauna named after the Muisca
