= Pegoscapus bacataensis =

Scientific classification
- Kingdom: Animalia
- Phylum: Arthropoda
- Clade: Pancrustacea
- Class: Insecta
- Order: Hymenoptera
- Family: Agaonidae
- Genus: Pegoscapus
- Species: P. bacataensis

Binomial name
- Pegoscapus bacataensis Jansen & Sarmiento, 2008

Species of wasp

Pegoscapus bacataensis is a species of fig wasp in the genus Pegoscapus which is native to Colombia. It has an obligate mutualism with Ficus andicola, the fig species it pollinates. It was first described by Sergio Jansen and Carlos Sarmiento in 2008. The egg stage of Pegoscapus bacataensis is around 130 days, longer than other pollinating fig wasps.

== Etymology ==
Pegoscapus bacataensis is named after Bacatá, the name for the Bogotá savanna in Muysccubun, the language of the indigenous Muisca.

== See also ==
- List of flora and fauna named after the Muisca
