= Adryas bochica =

Scientific classification
- Kingdom: Animalia
- Phylum: Arthropoda
- Clade: Pancrustacea
- Class: Insecta
- Order: Hymenoptera
- Family: Trichogrammatidae
- Genus: Adryas
- Species: A. bochica

Binomial name
- Adryas bochica Pinto & Owen, 2004

Species of bee

Adryas bochica is a species of bee in the genus Adryas of the family Trichogrammatidae. It was first described by Pinto and Owen in 2004. Holotypes of the species are stored in the Riverside Entomology Department collection of the University of California.

== Etymology ==
Adryas bochica is named after the mythological Bochica, messenger god in the religion of the Muisca.

== Habitat ==
Adryas bochica has been found at an altitude of 50 metres (160 ft) in Tayrona National Natural Park. The species has also been discovered in Belize, Costa Rica and Ecuador.

== See also ==
- List of flora and fauna named after the Muisca
