= Neocorynura electra =

Neocorynura electra Temporal range: Burdigalian

Scientific classification
- Kingdom: Animalia
- Phylum: Arthropoda
- Clade: Pancrustacea
- Class: Insecta
- Order: Hymenoptera
- Family: Halictidae
- Genus: Neocorynura
- Species: †N. electra

Binomial name
- †Neocorynura electra Engel, 1995

Extinct species of bee

Neocorynura electra is an extinct species of sweat bee in the Halictidae genus Neocorynura.

N. electra is named from the Latin electrum meaning "amber". The species is known from a single female specimen, the holotype, deposited in the American Museum of Natural History, and which was first studied by Dr. Michael S. Engel. He published his type description in the Journal of the New York Entomological Society volume 103 published in 1995. Extremely well preserved in early Miocene Burdigalian stage Dominican amber from the island of Hispaniola, the female individual is very slightly compressed along the legs and head but without apparent destruction of details and the specimen is free from "schimmel", a type of white mold sometimes present on arthropods in amber.

Though a fracture does cross the specimen the bee is not harmed, with the fracture running along the bee from the head down the body to the mesothorax. The wings of the female are either slightly folded or crumpled and held at an angle to the line of the thorax. Overall N. electra has a total length, not including antennae, of just over 7 millimetres (0.28 in) and a forewing length of 4.9 millimetres (0.19 in). As a whole the female has a metallic gold-green coloration to the head and thorax. The antenna and some of the region above the mouth are black while the pronotum is black with metallic green highlights. The legs are dark brown to black with strong metallic green highlights, while the wings are hyaline.

N. electra is the only species of Neocorynura known from fossils and one of only a few extinct Halictidae which are known from the amber record. N. electra can be identified from the extinct halictid genus Oligochlora by differences in the mesoscutum and carinate pronotal ridge. Although similar to the associated Dominican amber species Eickwortapis dominicana the mesoscutum is again different between the two species.

The modern Greater Antilles do not have any native species of Neocorynura. The closest living species is an undescribed species which is found on St. Vincent and Trinidad, known from specimens in the National Museum of Natural History. The relationship between N. electra, the only known species from the Greater Antilles, and species in Central and South America is not clear. The rarity of N. electra in the Dominican amber record may be in part due to the general habit of Neocorynura species bees to nest in the ground and not collect resin as other bees thus making contact and preservation unlikely.
