= Muisca togata =

Scientific classification
- Domain: Eukaryota
- Kingdom: Animalia
- Phylum: Arthropoda
- Class: Insecta
- Order: Coleoptera
- Suborder: Polyphaga
- Infraorder: Cucujiformia
- Family: Cleridae
- Genus: Muisca
- Species: M. togata

Binomial name
- Muisca togata (Chevrolat, 1874)

Synonyms
- Muisca cylindricollis Peracchi, 1962; Paracregya cylindricollis Peracchi, 1962; Cregya cylindricollis Peracchi, 1962

Species of beetles

Muisca togata is a species of checkered beetle in the family Cleridae. It is known from Brazil.

This genus is named after the Muisca from the Altiplano Cundiboyacense in central Colombia.

In research published in 2018, the species Cregya cylindricollis (Peracchi), and so Muisca cylindricollis, was synonymized with Muisca togata (Chevrolat).

== See also ==
- List of flora and fauna named after the Muisca
