= List of flora and fauna named after the Muisca =

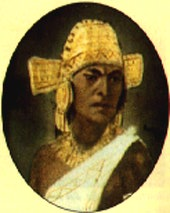
Saguamanchica was zipa of Bacatá between 1470 and 1490

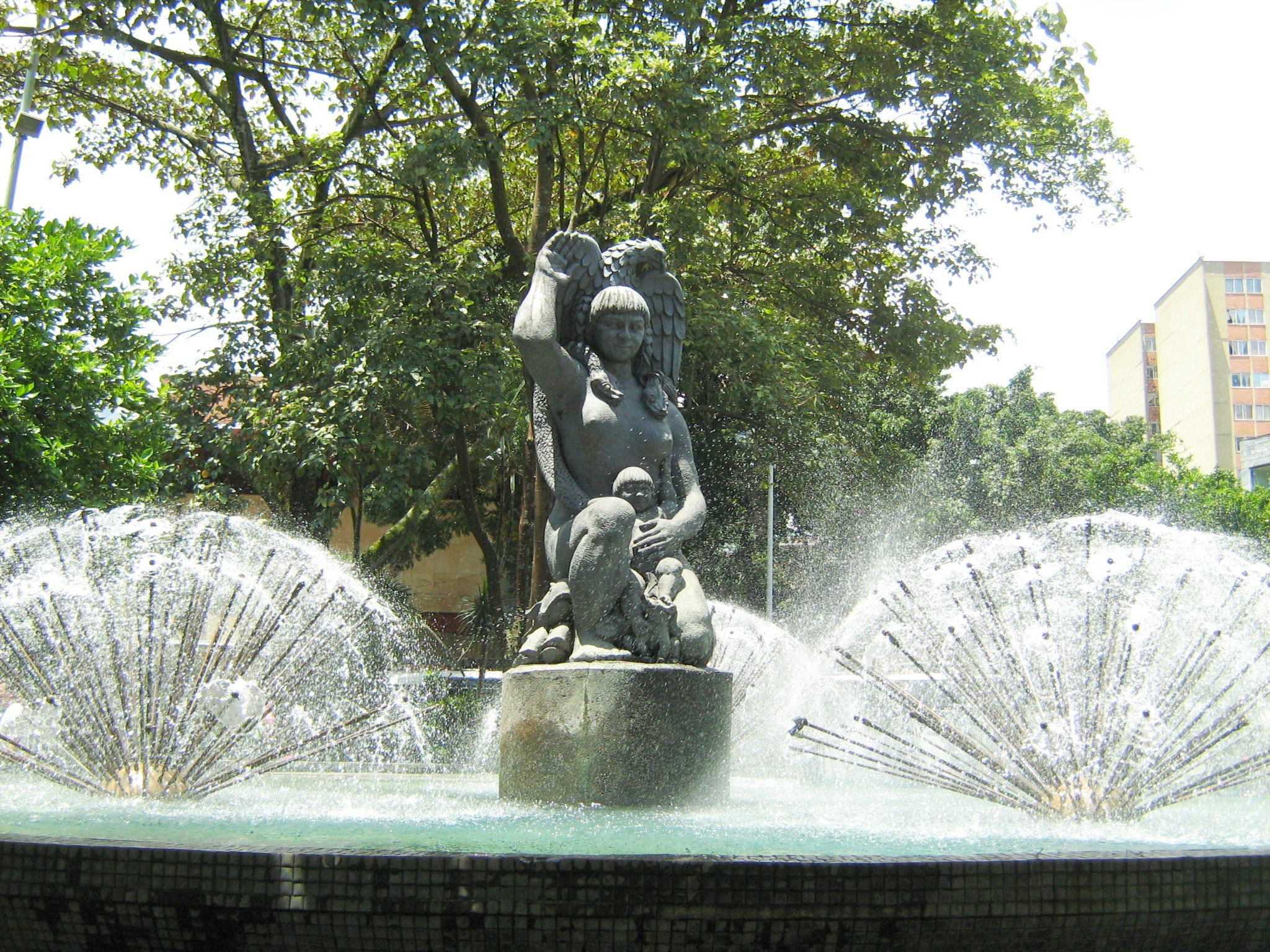
Bachué was the mother goddess of the Muisca

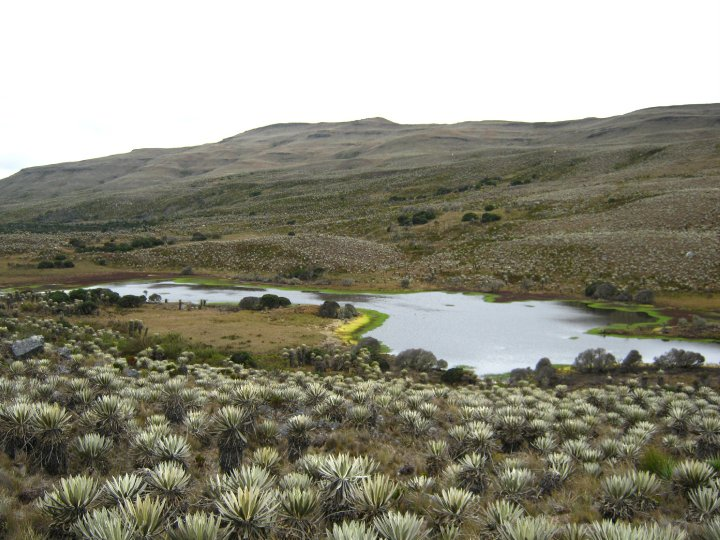
Sumapaz Páramo, to the south of Muisca territories, is the largest páramo in the world

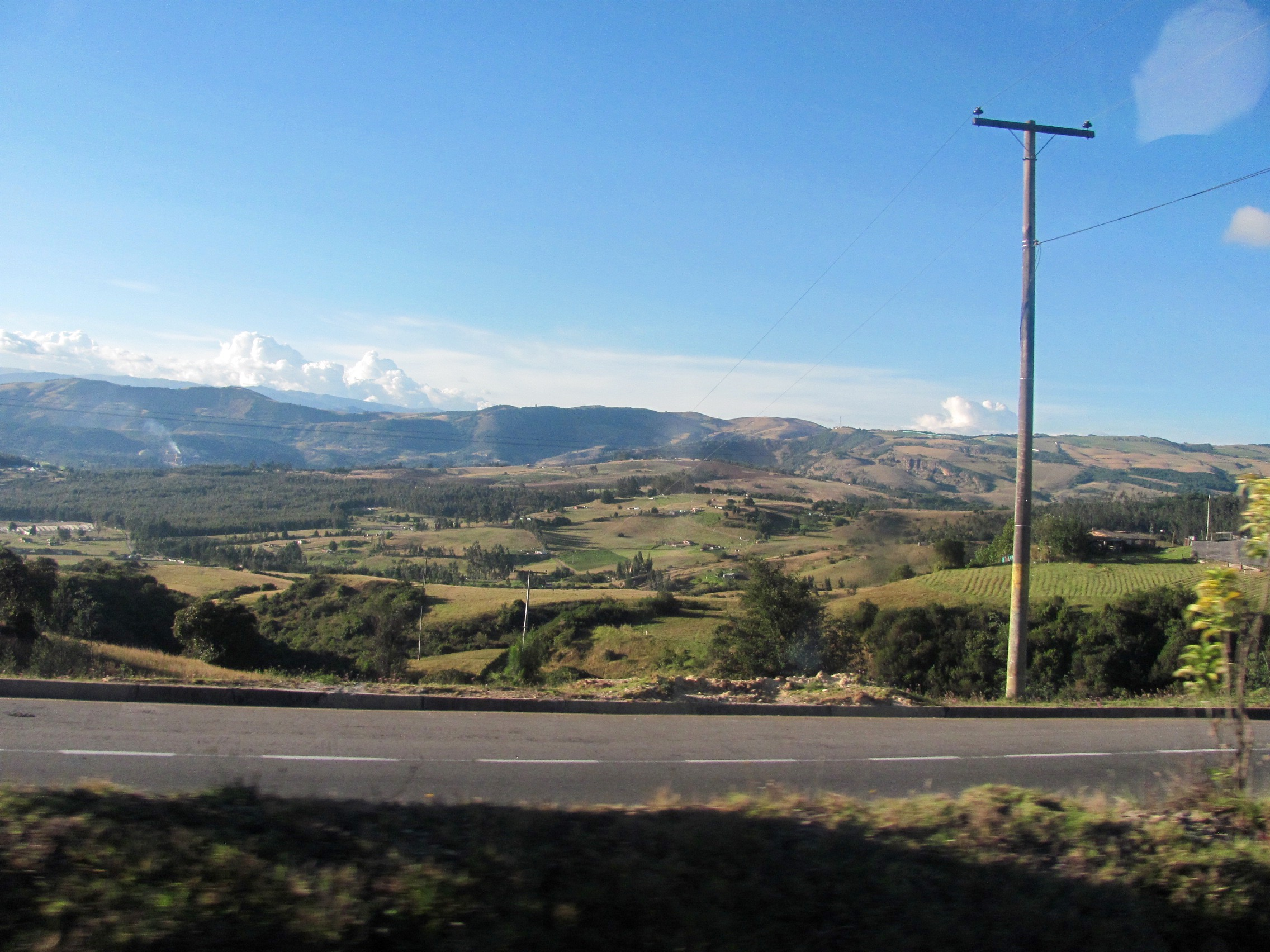
Landscape around Chocontá

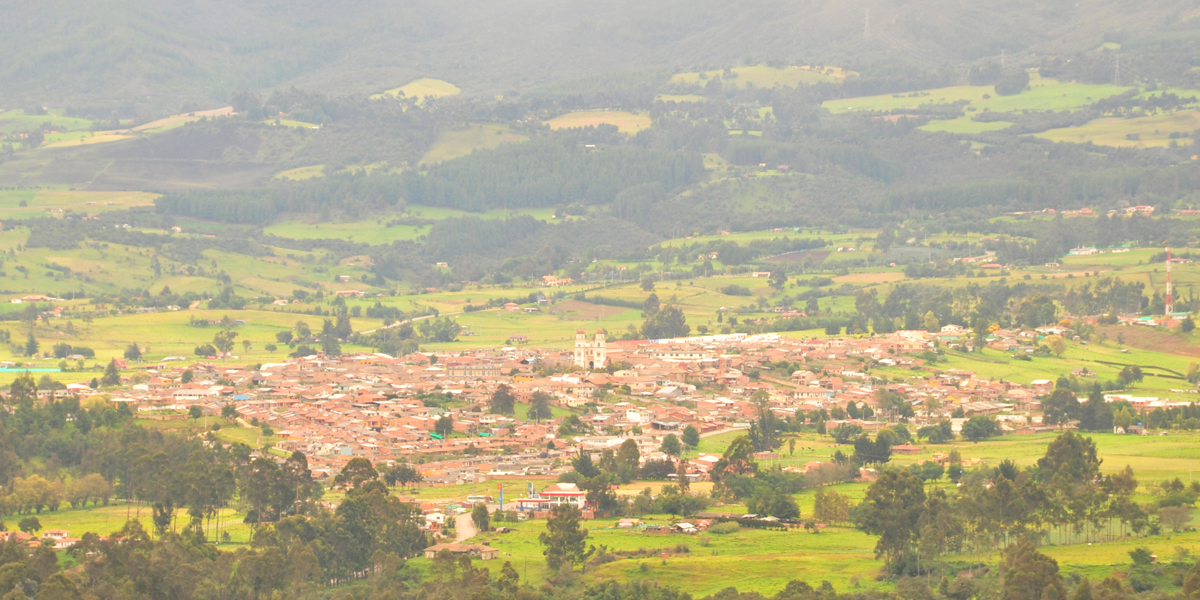
The village of Guasca is close to Chingaza National Park

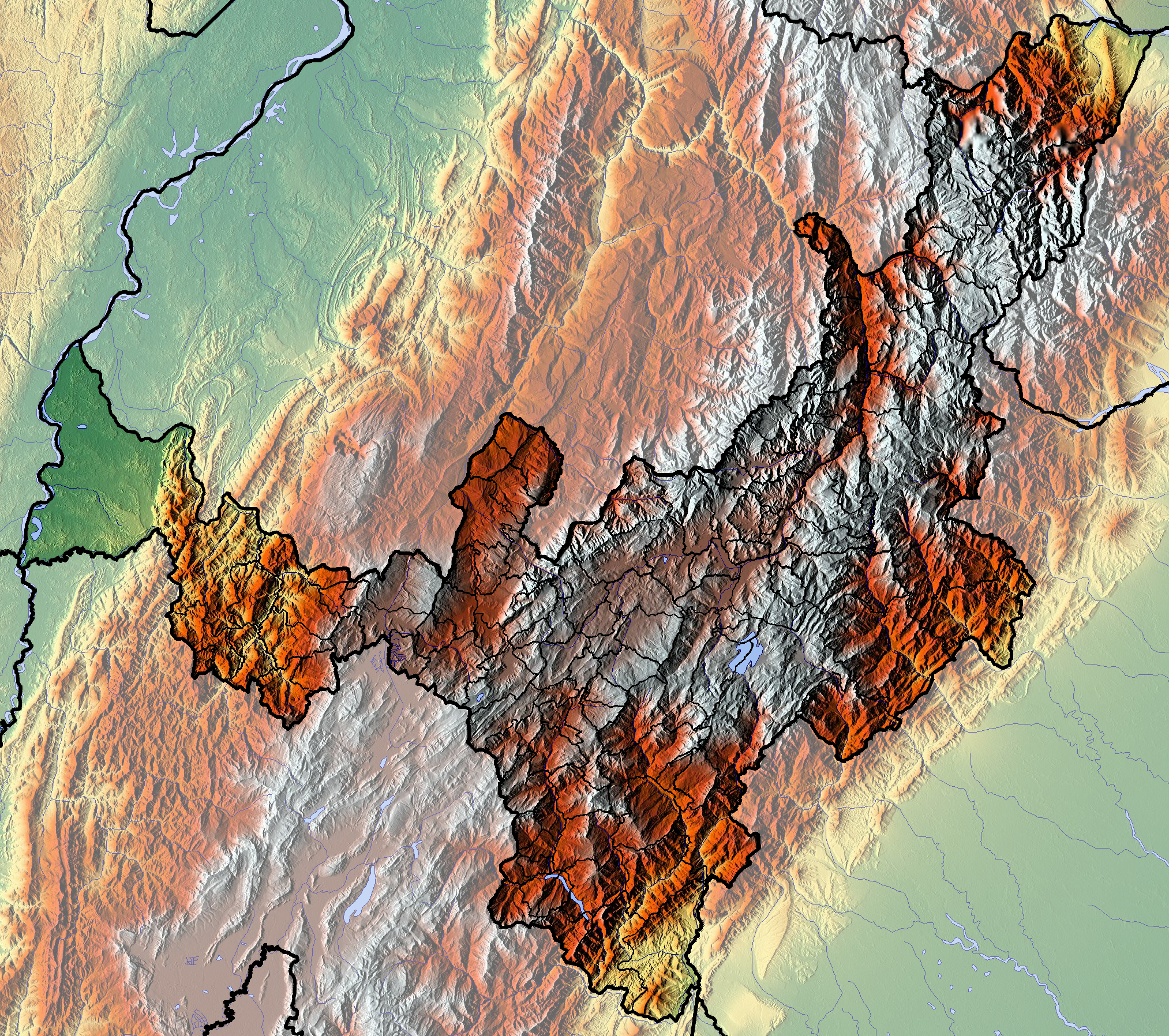
In Boyacá, northern part of the Muisca Confederation, many species have been found and named

The Muisca were a people living in the central highlands of Colombia; the Altiplano Cundiboyacense and neighbouring valleys. The variation of climates and ecozones within their territories made the Muisca excellent farmers. Over time, various species of flora and fauna have been discovered in Colombia. This list contains the living genera and species and fossils named after the Muisca, their religion or their settlements.

Three other Muisca etymologies are recognised; Thomagata Patera, named after mythological cacique Thomagata, and Bochica Patera are volcanoes on Io and BD Bacatá is the highest skyscraper of Colombia.

== List of flora and fauna named after the Muisca ==
Name	Gen/sp/fossil	Type	Named after	Topic	Image	Notes
Muisca	genus	beetle	Muisca	people		
Muisca bitaeniata	species	beetle	Muisca	people		
Muisca cylindricollis	species	beetle	Muisca	people		
Alabagrus muisca	species	wasp	Muisca	people		
Atelopus muisca	species	toad	Muisca	people		
Brachygasterina muisca	species	fly	Muisca	people		
Neocorynura muiscae	species	bee	Muisca	people		
†Muiscasaurus catheti	fossil (K)	ichthyosaur	Muisca	people		
Euryomma muisca	species	fly	Muisca	people		
Berberis muiscarum	species	shrub	Muisca	people		
Leporinus muyscorum	species	fish	Muisca	people		
Passalus quyefutynsuca	species	beetle	quye; "tree" futynsuca; "rotten	Muysccubun		
Chusquea	genus	bamboo	chusky: "ordinary reed of the Earth"	Muysccubun		
Cibyra saguanmachica	species	moth	Saguamanchica	rulers		
Adryas bochica	species	bee	Bochica	religion		
Protandrena bachue	species	bee	Bachué	religion		
Huitaca	genus	harvestmen	Huitaca	religion		
Huitaca bitaco	species	harvestmen	Huitaca	religion		
Huitaca boyacaensis	species	harvestmen	Huitaca; Boyacá	religion departments		
Huitaca caldas	species	harvestmen	Huitaca	religion		
Huitaca depressa	species	harvestmen	Huitaca	religion		
Huitaca sharkeyi	species	harvestmen	Huitaca	religion		
Huitaca tama	species	harvestmen	Huitaca	religion		
Huitaca ventralis	species	harvestmen	Huitaca	religion		
Gyalideopsis chicaque	species	lichen	Chicaque	nature		
Araneus chingaza	species	spider	Chingaza	nature		
Ischnura chingaza	species	dragonfly	Chingaza	nature		
Polylobus chingaza	species	beetle	Chingaza	nature		
Masdevallia sumapazensis	species	orchid	Sumapaz Páramo	nature		
Rhizosomichthys totae	species	catfish	Lake Tota	lakes		
Pristimantis susaguae	species	frog	Susaguá River	rivers		
†Etayoa bacatensis	fossil (Eo)	ungulate	Bacatá	settlements		
Pegoscapus bacataensis	species	wasp	Bacatá	settlements		
†Pedioceras caquesense syn. Ammonites ubaquensis	fossil (K)	ammonite	Cáqueza; Ubaque	settlements		
†Hamiticeras chipatai	fossil (K)	ammonite	Chipatá	settlements		
Choconta	genus	froghopper	Chocontá	settlements		
Choconta circulata	species	froghopper	Chocontá	settlements		
Choconta comitata	species	froghopper	Chocontá	settlements		
Choconta elliptica	species	froghopper	Chocontá	settlements		
Choconta juno	species	froghopper	Chocontá	settlements		
Choconta peruana	species	froghopper	Chocontá	settlements		
†Protexamites cucaitaense	fossil (K)	flora	Cucaita	settlements		
Dendropsophus garagoensis	species	frog	Garagoa	settlements		
Anapis guasca	species	spider	Guasca	settlements		
Dognina guasca	species	moth	Guasca	settlements		
Deinopis guasca	species	spider	Guasca	settlements		
†Platypterygius sachicarum	fossil (K)	ichthyosaur	Sáchica	settlements		
†Sachicasaurus vitae	fossil (K)	pliosaurid	Sáchica	settlements		
Zephyranthes susatana	species	fern	Susatá	settlements		
†Bacumorphomonocolpites tausae	fossil (K-Pg)	pollen	Tausa	settlements		
†Spinozonocolpites tausae	fossil (K-Pg)	pollen	Tausa	settlements		
†Pseudoosterella ubalaensis	fossil (K)	ammonite	Ubalá	settlements		
†Leptoceras ublanese	fossil (K)	ammonite	Ubalá	settlements		
†Geonomites zipaquirensis	fossil (K-Pg)	flora	Zipaquirá	settlements		
†Kronosaurus boyacensis	fossil (K)	pliosaur	Boyacá	departments		
†Subsaynella boyacaensis	fossil (K)	ammonite	Boyacá	departments		
†Archaeopaliurus boyacensis	fossil (K-Pg)	rose	Boyacá	departments		
†Cyclotrypa boyaca	fossil (D)	bryozoa	Boyacá	departments		
†Leptaena boyaca	fossil (D)	lamp shell	Boyacá	departments		
Hirtudiscus boyacensis	species	snail	Boyacá	departments		
Meteorus boyacensis	species	wasp	Boyacá	departments		
Isoetes boyacensis	species	quillwort	Boyacá	departments		
Agrostis boyacensis	species	grass	Boyacá	departments		
Lepanthes boyacensis	species	orchid	Boyacá	departments		
Senecio boyacensis	species	ragwort	Boyacá	departments		
Ageratina boyacensis	species	snakeroot	Boyacá	departments		
Aphelandra boyacensis	species	shrub	Boyacá	departments		
Festuca boyacensis	species	grass	Boyacá	departments		
Calamagrostis boyacensis	species	grass	Boyacá	departments		
Quercus boyacensis	species	oak	Boyacá	departments		
Puya boyacana	species	bromeliad	Boyacá	departments		

== See also ==
- List of Muisca toponyms
- Muisca
- Biodiversity of Colombia, Chibcha language, Bogotá savanna, Altiplano Cundiboyacense
