= Lake Iguaque =

Lake in Boyacá Department, Colombia

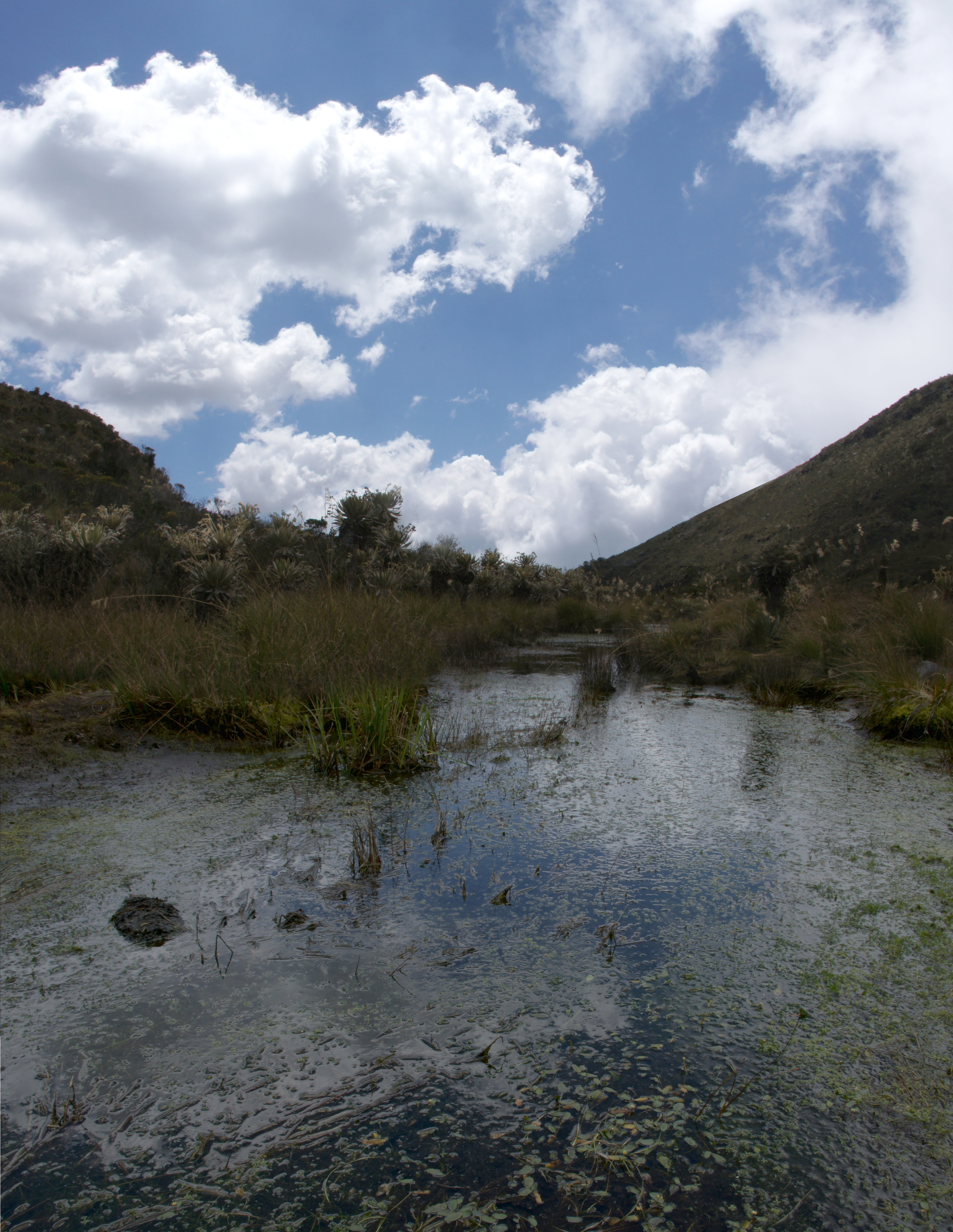
- Lake Iguaque

- Location within Colombia
- Location: Villa de Leyva, Boyacá
- Coordinates: 5°41′16″N 73°26′12″W
- Basin countries: Colombia
- Surface area: 6,750 m^{2} (72,700 sq ft)
- Max. depth: 5.2 m (17 ft)
- Surface elevation: 3,800 m (12,500 ft)

Lake Iguaque is a lake located in the Boyacá Department of Colombia. The lake and the surrounding area was declared a Flora and Fauna Sanctuary in 1977.

== Geography and climate ==
Lake Iguaque is located northeast of Villa de Leyva and is part of the SFF Iguaque. The predominant ecosystem is the páramo, with presence of frailejón plant, ferns, lichens and puyas. The average temperature is 12 °C. The route of access to the natural reservation is: Bogotá – Tunja (147 km) /Tunja – Villa de Leyva (39 km). The visitor center Furachiogua offers accommodation for up to 48 persons, and camping zone.

== Cultural value ==
Lake Iguaque was considered a sacred place for the Muisca. According to legend, mankind was originated in the Iguaque lake, when the goddess Bachué came out from the lake with a boy in her arms. When the boy grew, she married him and their children populated the Earth. They are considered the ancestors of the human race. Finally Bachué and her husband disappeared unto the lake in the shape of snakes.

== Biology ==
The in 2006 described sweat bee Neocorynura muiscae was found in the sanctuary near the lake and named after the Muisca.

== See also ==
- Muisca religion, Bachué
- Lake Guatavita, Lake Tota, Siecha Lakes
