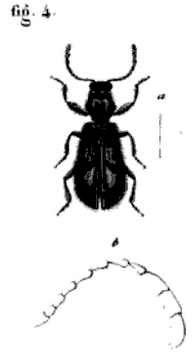
- Muisca bitaeniata

Scientific classification
- Kingdom: Animalia
- Phylum: Arthropoda
- Class: Insecta
- Order: Coleoptera
- Suborder: Polyphaga
- Infraorder: Cucujiformia
- Family: Cleridae
- Subfamily: Peloniinae
- Genus: Muisca; Spinola, 1844

Type species
- Muisca bitaeniata

Synonyms
- Paracregya

= Muisca (beetle) =

Genus of beetles

Muisca is a genus of checkered beetles of the subfamily of Clerinae or Enopliinae. The genus was first described by entomologist Maximilian Spinola in 1844.

Spinola contributed extensively to the entomological knowledge in the mid 19th century when specimens were brought to him from South America. The Muisca beetle was found in Colombia and part of the collection of Buquet.

In 1962 Brazilian zoologist Adriano Peracchi described a species Cregya cylindricollis. Peracchi later transferred this species to the genus Paracregya. Paracregya cylindricollis was then reclassified as Muisca cylindricollis by Ekis in 1975.

== Etymology ==
The genus Muisca has been named after the Muisca of central Colombia.

== Description ==
The labium and maxilla of the black-striped red Muisca beetle are less wide than long. This differs from the genus Aulicus.

== Species ==
These 33 species belong to the genus Muisca, found in Central and South America:

- Muisca adamanta (Opitz, 2018) - Brazil
- Muisca agma (Opitz, 2018) - Brazil, Venezuela
- Muisca anachyma (Opitz, 2018) - Colombia
- Muisca angulicollis (Chevrolat, 1876) - Colombia
- Muisca apicalis (Spinola, 1844) - Bolivia, Brazil
- Muisca biordinis (Opitz, 2018) - Colombia, Venezuela, Ecuador
- Muisca bitaeniata Spinola, 1844 - Panamá, Colombia, Venezuela
- Muisca dilatata ((Chevrolat, 1876)) - Bolivia, Brazil, Paraguay
- Muisca dozieri (Opitz, 2018) - Bolivia, Brazil
- Muisca fera (Wolcott, 1927) - Costa Rica
- Muisca heppneri (Opitz, 2018) - Panamá
- Muisca hexa (Opitz, 2018) - Brazil
- Muisca hirtula (Klug, 1842) - Brazil
- Muisca insigna (Chevrolat, 1874) - Brazil
- Muisca irrorata (Gorham, 1877) - Bolivia, Brazil
- Muisca lateripunctata (Schenkling, 1906) - Colombia
- Muisca maculosa (Gorham, 1877) - Brazil
- Muisca magdalena (Opitz, 2018) - Colombia
- Muisca malakela (Opitz, 2018) - Peru
- Muisca menda (Opitz, 2018) - Colombia
- Muisca mestolinea (Opitz, 2018) - Ecuador
- Muisca nigrosignata (Spinola, 1844) - Colombia, Venezuela
- Muisca octonotata (Gorham, 1883) - Costa Rica, Panamá
- Muisca omma (Opitz, 2018) - Colombia, Ecuador
- Muisca peruviana (Pic, 1952) - Peru, Bolivia
- Muisca sigilla (Opitz, 2018) - Bolivia
- Muisca signa (Opitz, 2018) - Peru
- Muisca testacea (Klug, 1842) - Brazil
- Muisca tetraspilota (Chevrolat, 1876) - Colombia
- Muisca togata (Chevrolat, 1874) - Brazil
- Muisca variabilis (Spinola, 1844) - Brazil
- Muisca xanthura (Chevrolat, 1876) - French Guiana, Bolivia, Brazil
- Muisca zona (Opitz, 2018) - Bolivia

== See also ==
- List of flora and fauna named after the Muisca
