= Aulicus femoralis =

Scientific classification
- Domain: Eukaryota
- Kingdom: Animalia
- Phylum: Arthropoda
- Class: Insecta
- Order: Coleoptera
- Suborder: Polyphaga
- Infraorder: Cucujiformia
- Family: Cleridae
- Genus: Aulicus
- Species: A. femoralis

Binomial name
- Aulicus femoralis Schaeffer, 1917

Species of beetle

Aulicus femoralis is a species of checkered beetle in the family Cleridae. It is found in North America.
