= Aulicus dentipes =

Scientific classification
- Domain: Eukaryota
- Kingdom: Animalia
- Phylum: Arthropoda
- Class: Insecta
- Order: Coleoptera
- Suborder: Polyphaga
- Infraorder: Cucujiformia
- Family: Cleridae
- Genus: Aulicus
- Species: A. dentipes

Binomial name
- Aulicus dentipes Schaeffer, 1921

Species of beetle

Aulicus dentipes is a species of checkered beetle in the family Cleridae. It is found in North America.
