= Neocorynura muiscae =

Scientific classification
- Kingdom: Animalia
- Phylum: Arthropoda
- Clade: Pancrustacea
- Class: Insecta
- Order: Hymenoptera
- Family: Halictidae
- Genus: Neocorynura
- Species: N. muiscae

Binomial name
- Neocorynura muiscae Smith-Pardo & Gonzalez, 2006

Species of bee

Neocorynura muiscae is a species of sweat bee of the genus Neocorynura in the subfamily of Halictinae of the family of Halictidae. It was first described by Allan H. Smith-Pardo and Victor H. Gonzalez in 2006.

== Etymology and habitat ==
Neocorynura muiscae is named after the Muisca, who inhabited the central highlands of the Colombian Andes (Altiplano Cundiboyacense) where four specimens of the bee have been found at an elevation of 2,850 metres (9,350 ft); in the Santuario de fauna y flora Iguaque, Boyacá.

== Nesting ==
The nesting structure of Neocorynura muiscae has an entrance of an earthen turret surrounded by an elliptical tumulus. The surfaces of the turrets are not polished but internally smooth. The exterior is rough. Main burrows are vertical in flat ground. Most of the nests have been discovered in the pasture.

== See also ==
- List of flora and fauna named after the Muisca
