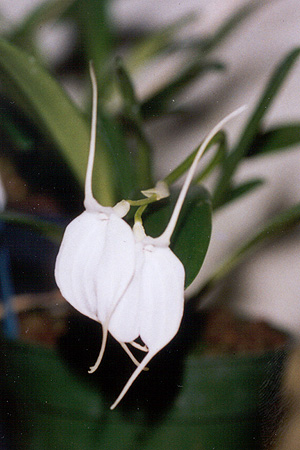

Scientific classification
- Kingdom: Plantae
- Clade: Tracheophytes
- Clade: Angiosperms
- Clade: Monocots
- Order: Asparagales
- Family: Orchidaceae
- Subfamily: Epidendroideae
- Genus: Masdevallia
- Subgenus: Masdevallia subg. Polyantha
- Section: Masdevallia sect. Alaticaules
- Species: M. tovarensis

Binomial name
- Masdevallia tovarensis Rchb.f.

Synonyms
- Masdevallia candida Klotzsch & H.Karst. ex Rchb.f.

= Masdevallia tovarensis =

Species of orchid

Masdevallia tovarensis is a species of orchid endemic to northern Venezuela.
