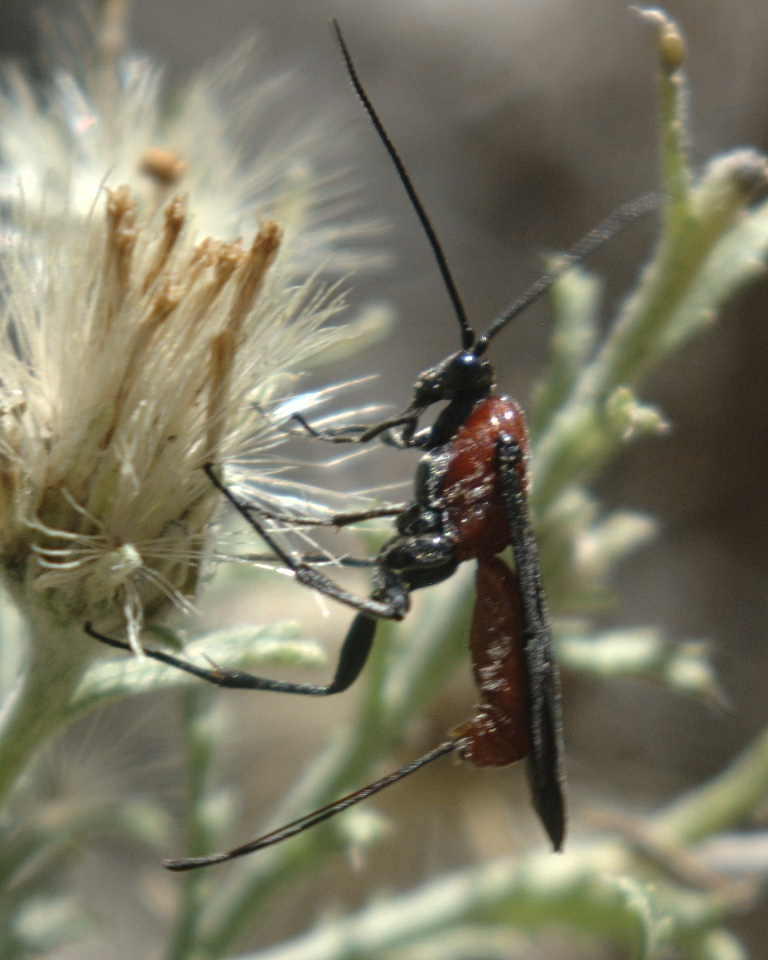

Scientific classification
- Kingdom: Animalia
- Phylum: Arthropoda
- Clade: Pancrustacea
- Class: Insecta
- Order: Hymenoptera
- Family: Braconidae
- Genus: Alabagrus
- Species: A. muisca

Binomial name
- Alabagrus muisca Sharkey, 1988

= Alabagrus muisca =

Species of wasp

Alabagrus muisca is a species of parasitoid wasp in the subfamily of Agathidinae of the family Braconidae. The wasp was described by Sharkey in 1988.

== Etymology ==
This species is named for the Muisca people, who inhabited the Altiplano Cundiboyacense in Colombia, where the wasp was found.

== Description ==
Forewing entirely and evenly black. Hind tibia black; maxillary and labial palpomeres yellowish orange; mid tarsus black.

== See also ==
- List of flora and fauna named after the Muisca
