= Euryomma muisca =

Scientific classification
- Kingdom: Animalia
- Phylum: Arthropoda
- Clade: Pancrustacea
- Class: Insecta
- Order: Diptera
- Family: Fanniidae
- Genus: Euryomma
- Species: E. muisca

Binomial name
- Euryomma muisca Grisales et al., 2012

Species of fly

Euryomma muisca is a species of fly in the genus Euryomma. It was first described by Grisales et al. in 2012.

== Etymology ==
Euryomma muisca is named after the Muisca, who inhabited the central highlands (Altiplano Cundiboyacense) of present-day Colombia where the fly has been found.

== Description ==
The fly has dark brown frontal vitta, the length of the postpedicel is 1.5 times the length of the pedicel. The wings are approximately 3 millimetres (0.12 in) long.

== See also ==
- List of flora and fauna named after the Muisca

== Bibliography ==
- Grisales, Diana; Lecheta, Melise C.; Aballay, Fernando H.; De Carvalho, Claudio J.B. (2016), "A key and checklist to the Neotropical forensically important "Little House Flies" (Diptera: Fanniidae)" (PDF), Zoologia, 33 (6): 1–16, doi:10.1590/s1984-4689zool-20160054
- Grisales, Diana; Wolff, Marta; De Carvalho, Claudio J.B. (2012), "Neotropical Fanniidae (Insecta: Diptera): new species of Euryomma Stein from Colombia", Journal of Natural History, 46 (13–14): 803–829, Bibcode:2012JNatH..46..803G, doi:10.1080/00222933.2011.651644
