= Masdevallia goliath =

Scientific classification
- Kingdom: Plantae
- Clade: Tracheophytes
- Clade: Angiosperms
- Clade: Monocots
- Order: Asparagales
- Family: Orchidaceae
- Subfamily: Epidendroideae
- Genus: Masdevallia
- Subgenus: Masdevallia subg. Masdevallia
- Section: Masdevallia sect. Coriaceae
- Species: M. goliath

Binomial name
- Masdevallia goliath Luer & Andreetta

Synonyms
- Regalia goliath (Luer & Andreetta) Luer

Species of plant

Masdevallia goliath is a species of epiphytic orchid native to northeastern Peru and southeastern Ecuador but is cultivated as an ornamental elsewhere. It grows in nature in cloud forests at elevations over 1500 m.

Masdevallia goliath is an epiphytic herb. Leaves are thick and leathery, narrow, up to 25 cm long. Inflorescence is a short raceme on a purple flowering stalk. Sepals are thick, dark reddish-purple, up to 30 mm long, tapering to a long narrow point. Lateral petals are up to 6 mm long, yellow with purple spots; lip up to 6 mm long, yellow-orange with red-purple spots.
