= Atelopus muisca =

Conservation status
- Critically Endangered (IUCN 3.1)

Scientific classification
- Kingdom: Animalia
- Phylum: Chordata
- Class: Amphibia
- Order: Anura
- Family: Bufonidae
- Genus: Atelopus
- Species: A. muisca

Binomial name
- Atelopus muisca Rueda-Almonacid & Hoyos, 1992

Extinct species of amphibian

Atelopus muisca, the La Arboleda stubfoot toad, is an extinct species of toad in the family Bufonidae. It is endemic to Colombia. Its natural habitats were subtropical or tropical moist montane forests, subtropical or tropical high-altitude grassland, and rivers. It is threatened by habitat loss.

== Etymology and habitat ==
The species name "muisca" is taken from the Muisca who inhabited the area where the toad has been found; Chingaza Natural National Park in an area of 10 square kilometres (3.9 sq mi), at altitudes between 2,900 and 3,350 metres (9,510 and 10,990 ft) above sea level.

== See also ==
- List of flora and fauna named after the Muisca
