= Brachygasterina muisca =

Scientific classification
- Kingdom: Animalia
- Phylum: Arthropoda
- Clade: Pancrustacea
- Class: Insecta
- Order: Diptera
- Family: Muscidae
- Genus: Brachygasterina
- Species: B. muisca

Binomial name
- Brachygasterina muisca Soares & De Carvalho, 2012

Species of fly

Brachygasterina muisca is a species of fly in the genus Brachygasterina of the subfamily Muscinae, described in 2012 by Soares and De Carvalho.

== Etymology ==
Brachygasterina muisca is named after the Muisca, who inhabited the central highlands of present-day Colombia where the fly has been found.

== See also ==
- List of flora and fauna named after the Muisca

== Bibliography ==
- Pérez, Sandra; Wolff, Marta; De Carvalho, Claudio J.B. (19 November 2012). "A new species of Brachygasterina Macquart from Colombia, and description of the males of B. stuebeli Röder and B. muisca Soares & Carvalho (Diptera: Muscidae) - Abstract" (PDF). Zootaxa. 3554. Magnolia Press: 45–57. doi:10.11646/zootaxa.3554.1.3. ISSN 1175-5334.
