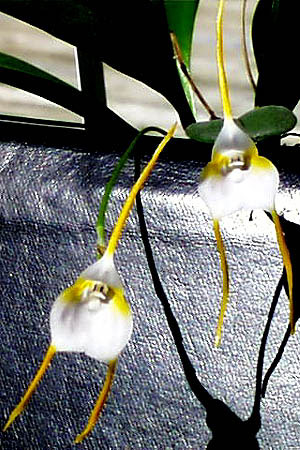

Scientific classification
- Kingdom: Plantae
- Clade: Tracheophytes
- Clade: Angiosperms
- Clade: Monocots
- Order: Asparagales
- Family: Orchidaceae
- Subfamily: Epidendroideae
- Genus: Masdevallia
- Subgenus: Masdevallia subg. Masdevallia
- Section: Masdevallia sect. Masdevallia
- Subsection: Masdevallia subsect. Masdevallia
- Species: M. mejiana

Binomial name
- Masdevallia mejiana Garay

Synonyms
- Reichantha mejiana (Garay) Luer

= Masdevallia mejiana =

Species of orchid

Masdevallia mejiana is a species of flowering plant in the Family Orchidaceae. It is endemic to Colombia.
