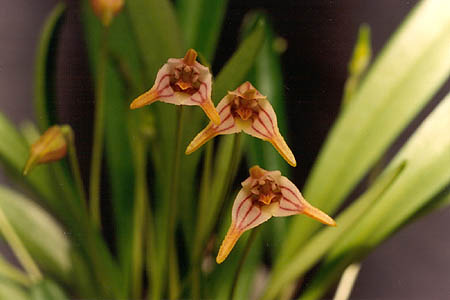

Scientific classification
- Kingdom: Plantae
- Clade: Tracheophytes
- Clade: Angiosperms
- Clade: Monocots
- Order: Asparagales
- Family: Orchidaceae
- Subfamily: Epidendroideae
- Genus: Masdevallia
- Subgenus: Masdevallia subg. Masdevallia
- Section: Masdevallia sect. Reichenbachianae
- Subsection: Masdevallia subsect. Reichenbachianae
- Species: M. striatella

Binomial name
- Masdevallia striatella Rchb.f.

Synonyms
- Masdevallia chloracra Rchb.f.; Masdevallia superflua Kraenzl.

= Masdevallia striatella =

Species of orchid

Masdevallia striatella is a species of orchid that occurs from Costa Rica to western Panama.
