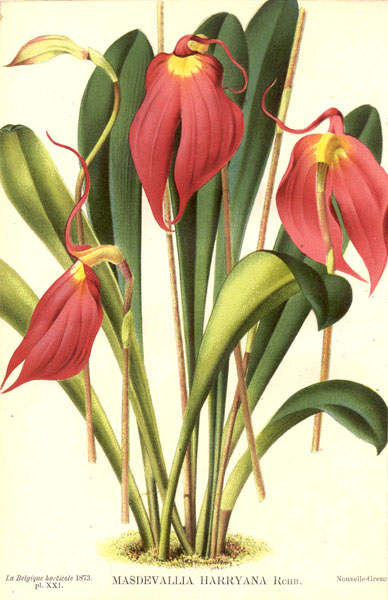

Scientific classification
- Kingdom: Plantae
- Clade: Tracheophytes
- Clade: Angiosperms
- Clade: Monocots
- Order: Asparagales
- Family: Orchidaceae
- Subfamily: Epidendroideae
- Genus: Masdevallia
- Subgenus: Masdevallia subg. Masdevallia
- Section: Masdevallia sect. Masdevallia
- Subsection: Masdevallia subsect. Coccineae
- Species: M. coccinea

Binomial name
- Masdevallia coccinea Linden ex Lindl.

Synonyms
- See text

= Masdevallia coccinea =

Species of orchid

Masdevallia coccinea, the little flag, is a species of orchid occurring at high altitudes in the Eastern Cordillera of Colombia.

== Synonyms ==
- Masdevallia coccinea var. conchiflora H.J. Veitch
- Masdevallia coccinea var. harryana (Rchb.f.) H.J. Veitch
- Masdevallia coccinea var. lindenii Stein
- Masdevallia coccinea var. militaris (Rchb.f. & Warsz.) O. Gruss & M. Wolff
- Masdevallia denisonii Dombrain
- Masdevallia harryana Rchb.f.
- Masdevallia harryana var. atrosanguinea B.S. Williams & T. Moore
- Masdevallia harryana var. decora B.S. Williams
- Masdevallia harryana var. miniata B.S. Williams & T. Moore
- Masdevallia lindenii André
- Masdevallia lindenii var. grandiflora L. Linden & Rodigas
- Masdevallia lindenii var. harryana (Rchb.f.) André
- Masdevallia militaris Rchb.f. & Warsz.
