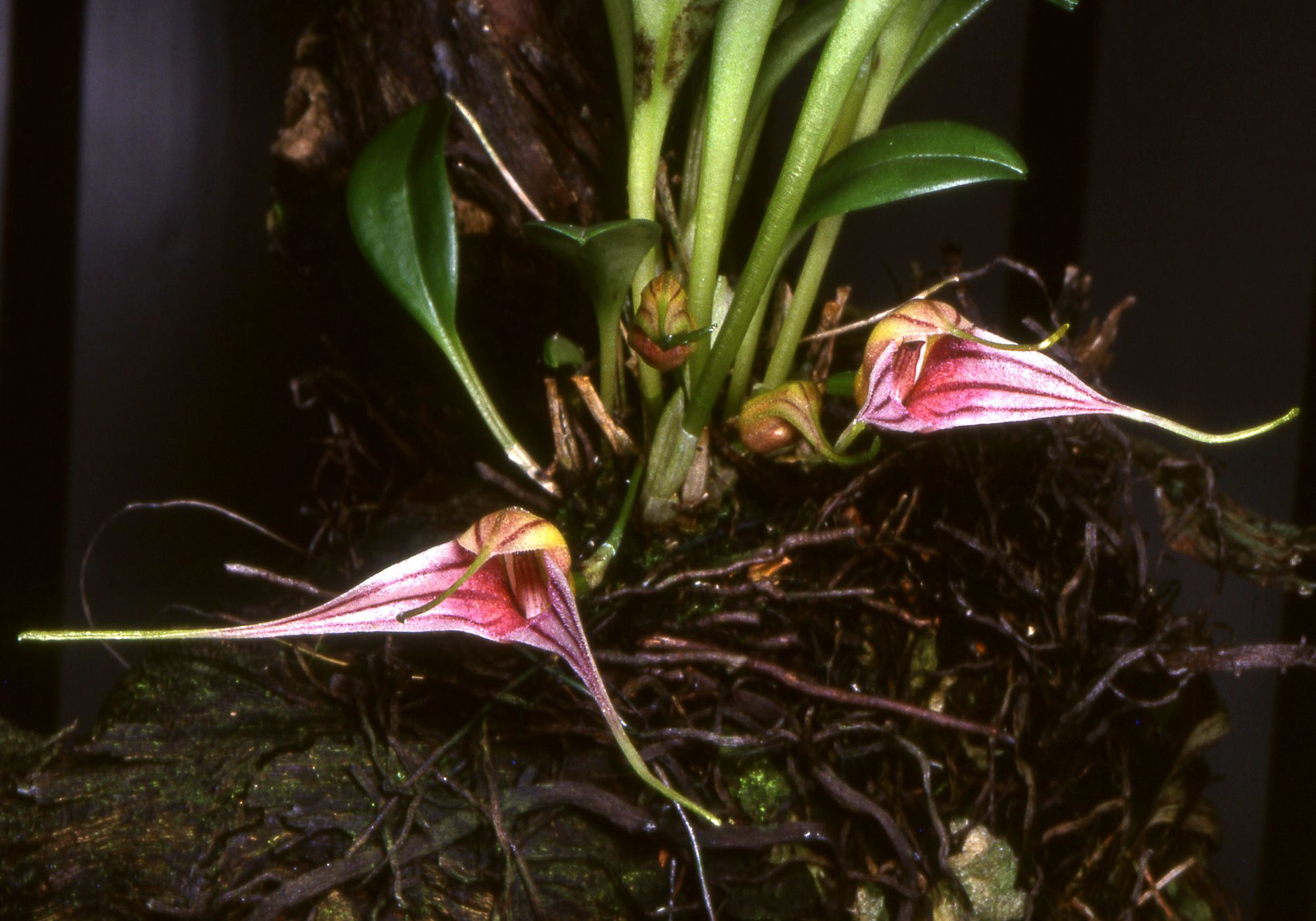

Scientific classification
- Kingdom: Plantae
- Clade: Tracheophytes
- Clade: Angiosperms
- Clade: Monocots
- Order: Asparagales
- Family: Orchidaceae
- Subfamily: Epidendroideae
- Genus: Masdevallia
- Species: M. odontocera

Binomial name
- Masdevallia odontocera (Luer & R. Escobar)

= Masdevallia odontocera =

Species of orchid

Masdevallia odontocera, the tusked masdevallia, is a species of epiphytic orchid native to the cloud forests of Colombia. The species name is derived from Greek odontoceras, meaning "a tusk". This is in reference to the appearance of the lateral sepals.
