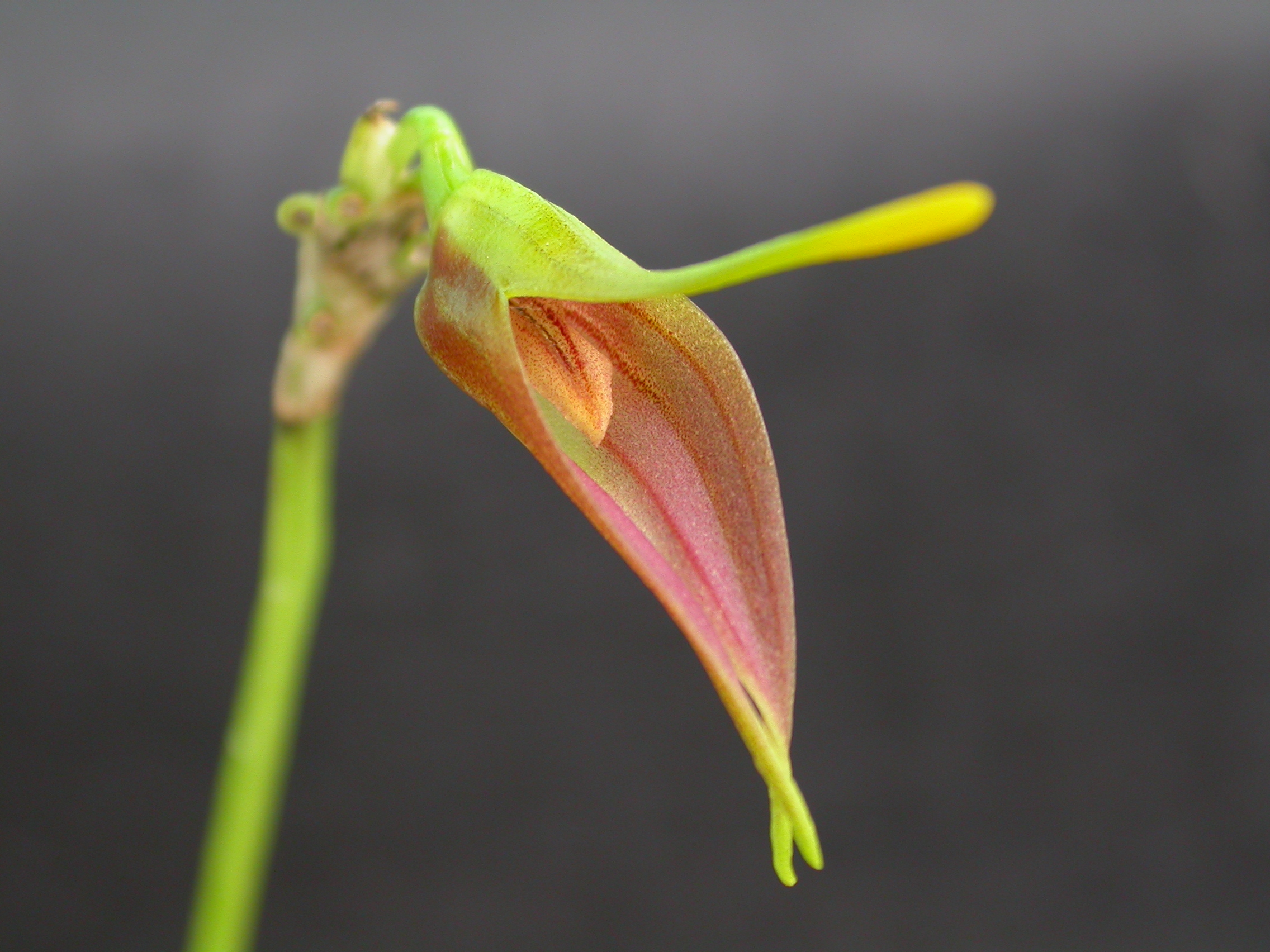

Scientific classification
- Kingdom: Plantae
- Clade: Tracheophytes
- Clade: Angiosperms
- Clade: Monocots
- Order: Asparagales
- Family: Orchidaceae
- Subfamily: Epidendroideae
- Genus: Masdevallia
- Subgenus: Masdevallia subg. Polyantha
- Section: Masdevallia sect. Alaticaules
- Species: M. vargasii

Binomial name
- Masdevallia vargasii C.Schweinf.

Synonyms
- Masdevallia richteri Pabst; Masdevallia megaloglossa Luer & R.Escobar; Masdevallia helgae Königer & J.Portilla; Alaticaulia helgae (Königer & J.Portilla) Luer; Alaticaulia vargasii (C.Schweinf.) Luer

= Masdevallia vargasii =

Species of orchid

Masdevallia vargasii is a species of orchid found in areas from southern Colombia to central Bolivia and Guyana.
