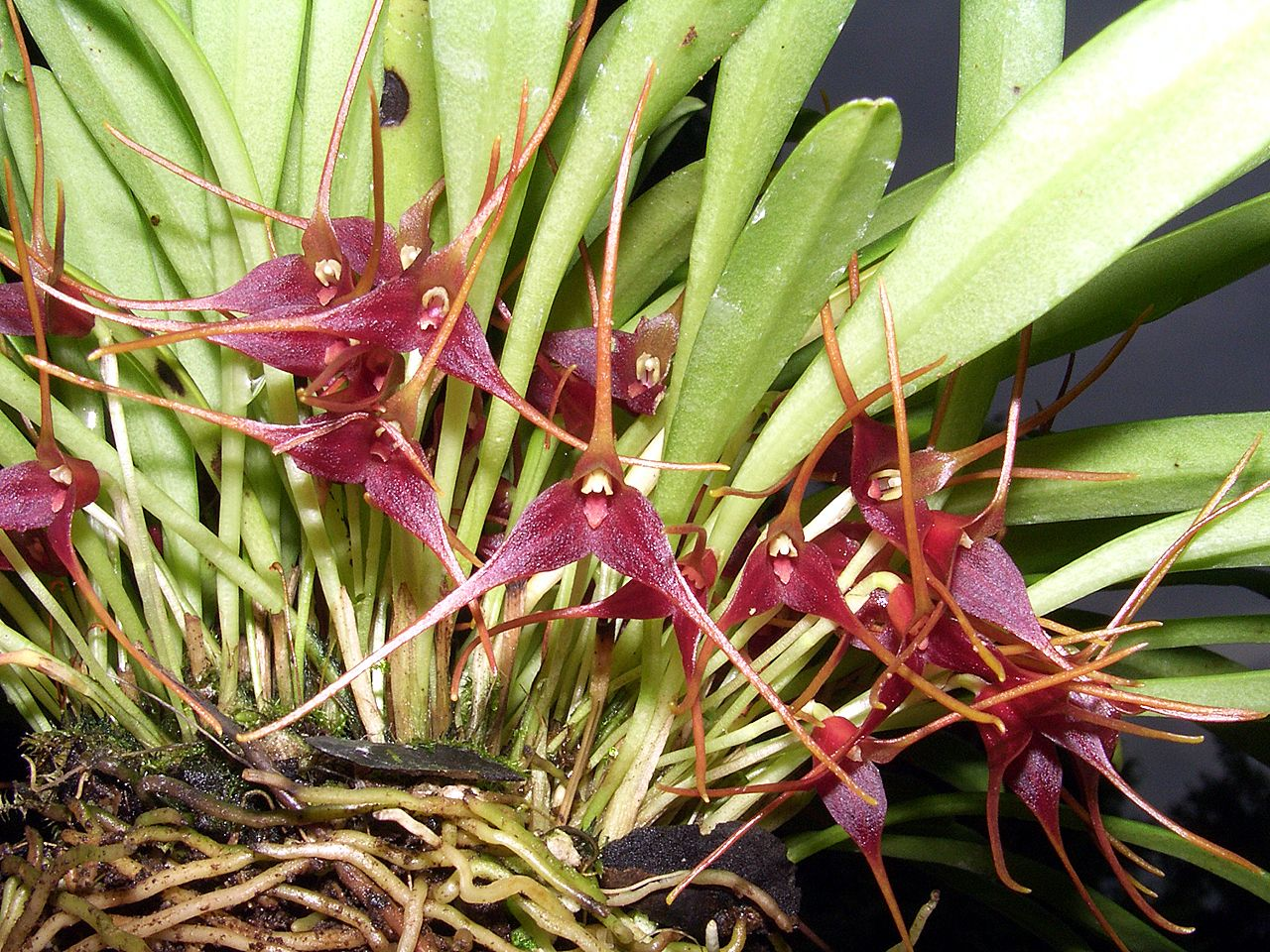

Scientific classification
- Kingdom: Plantae
- Clade: Tracheophytes
- Clade: Angiosperms
- Clade: Monocots
- Order: Asparagales
- Family: Orchidaceae
- Subfamily: Epidendroideae
- Genus: Masdevallia
- Subgenus: Masdevallia subg. Masdevallia
- Section: Masdevallia sect. Minutae
- Species: M. herradurae

Binomial name
- Masdevallia herradurae F. Lehm. & Kraenzl.

Synonyms
- Masdevallia frontinoensis Kraenzl.

= Masdevallia herradurae =

Species of orchid

Masdevallia herradurae is a species of orchid native to the Western Cordillera and Central Cordillera of Colombia.
