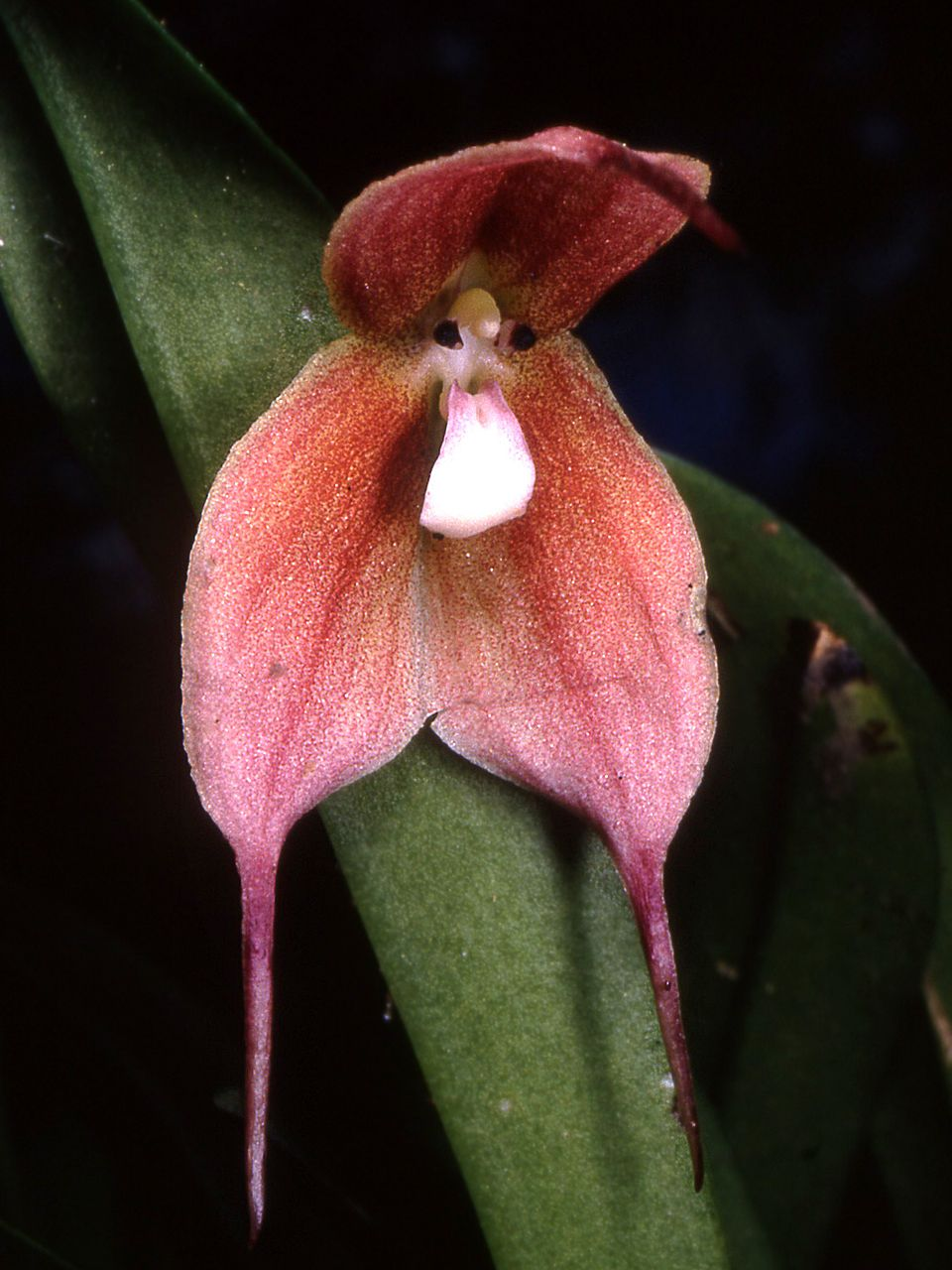

Scientific classification
- Kingdom: Plantae
- Clade: Tracheophytes
- Clade: Angiosperms
- Clade: Monocots
- Order: Asparagales
- Family: Orchidaceae
- Subfamily: Epidendroideae
- Genus: Dracula
- Species: D. trichroma

Binomial name
- Dracula trichroma (Schltr.) Hermans

Synonyms
- Masdevallia tricolor Rchb.f.; Masdevallia trichroma Schltr. (Basionym); Masdevallia iricolor Rchb.f. ex Kraenzl.; Masdevallia quilichaoensis F. Lehm. & Kraenzl.; Dracula quilichaoensis (F. Lehm. & Kraenzl.) Luer; Dracula iricolor (Rchb.f. ex Kraenzl.) Luer & R. Escobar

= Dracula trichroma =

Species of orchid

Dracula trichroma is a species of orchid found in Colombia, Western South America, Southern America and Ecuador. It is in the sub tribe of Pleurothallidinae which is within the tribe of Epidendreae. It is also in the sub family of Epidendroideae.

It has been recorded in Antioquia, Cauca, Risaralda and Putomayo departments of Colombia and Ecuador, in cloud forests at elevations of 900 to 2600 meters. It is also known as the "Tri Colored Dracula".
