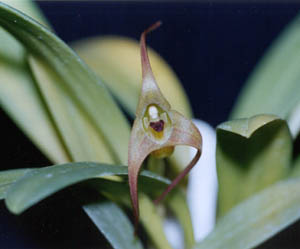

Scientific classification
- Kingdom: Plantae
- Clade: Tracheophytes
- Clade: Angiosperms
- Clade: Monocots
- Order: Asparagales
- Family: Orchidaceae
- Subfamily: Epidendroideae
- Genus: Masdevallia
- Subgenus: Masdevallia subg. Masdevallia
- Section: Masdevallia sect. Coriaceae
- Subsection: Masdevallia subsect. Coriaceae
- Species: M. fractiflexa

Binomial name
- Masdevallia fractiflexa F. Lehm. & Kraenzl.

= Masdevallia fractiflexa =

Species of orchid

Masdevallia fractiflexa is a species of orchid endemic to southeastern Ecuador. It blooms in the winter with a single 2.5 cm wide flower.
