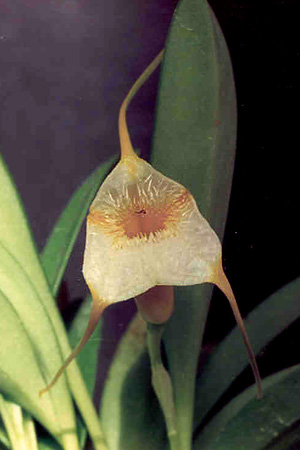

Scientific classification
- Kingdom: Plantae
- Clade: Tracheophytes
- Clade: Angiosperms
- Clade: Monocots
- Order: Asparagales
- Family: Orchidaceae
- Subfamily: Epidendroideae
- Genus: Masdevallia
- Subgenus: Masdevallia subg. Masdevallia
- Section: Masdevallia sect. Masdevallia
- Subsection: Masdevallia subsect. Masdevallia
- Species: M. agaster

Binomial name
- Masdevallia agaster Luer

= Masdevallia agaster =

Species of orchid

Masdevallia agaster is a species of epiphytic orchid endemic to southern Ecuador.
