= Masdevallia teaguei =

Scientific classification
- Kingdom: Plantae
- Clade: Tracheophytes
- Clade: Angiosperms
- Clade: Monocots
- Order: Asparagales
- Family: Orchidaceae
- Subfamily: Epidendroideae
- Genus: Masdevallia
- Species: M. teaguei

Binomial name
- Masdevallia teaguei Luer

Synonyms
- Jostia teaguei (Luer) Luer; Masdevallia braasii H.Mohr

Species of orchid

Masdevallia teaguei is a species of orchid in the genus Masdevallia. It occurs from Colombia to Ecuador.
