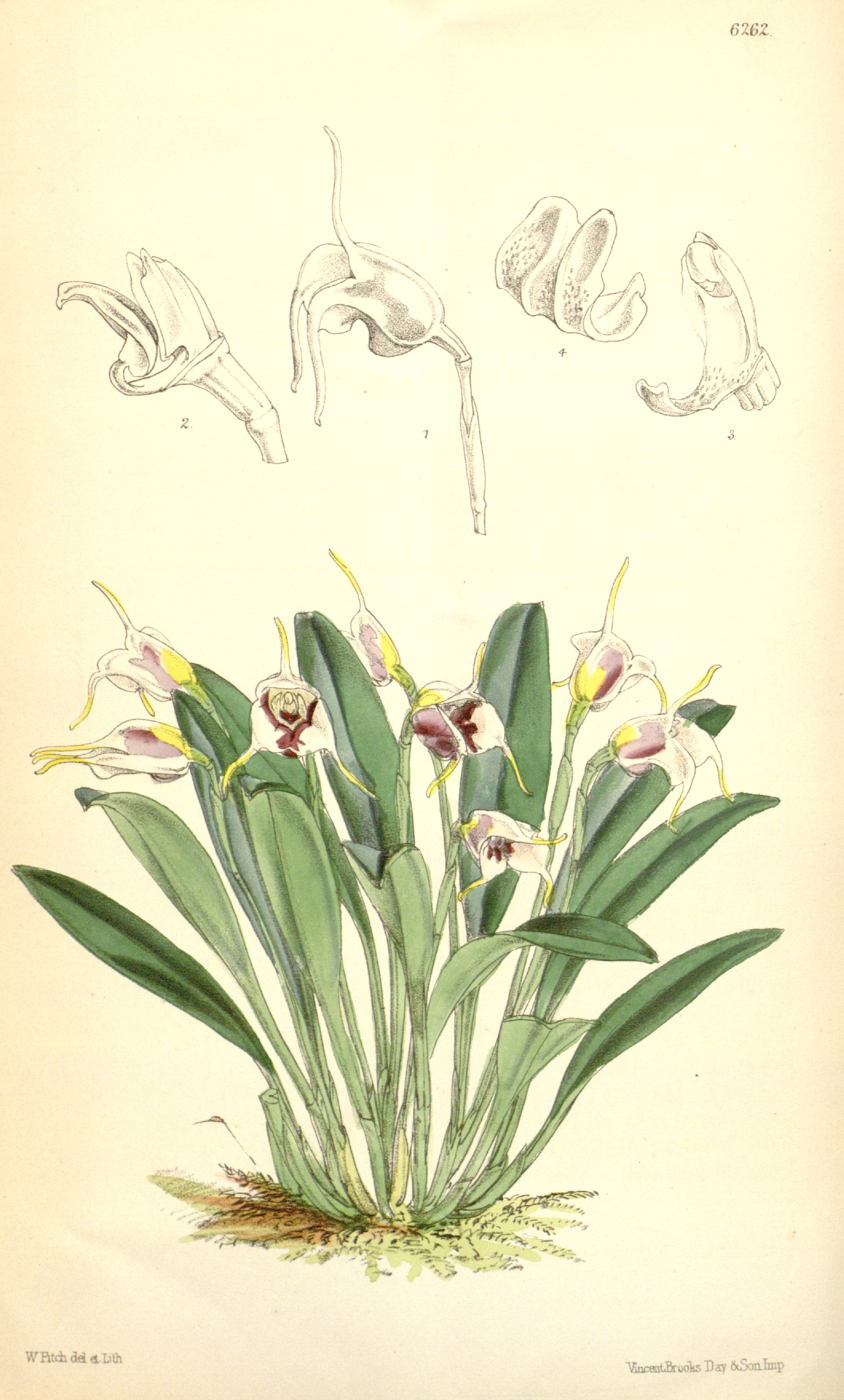

Scientific classification
- Kingdom: Plantae
- Clade: Tracheophytes
- Clade: Angiosperms
- Clade: Monocots
- Order: Asparagales
- Family: Orchidaceae
- Subfamily: Epidendroideae
- Genus: Masdevallia
- Species: M. ionocharis

Binomial name
- Masdevallia ionocharis Rchb.f. 1875

= Masdevallia ionocharis =

Species of plant

Masdevallia ionocharis, the graceful violet-blue masdevallia, is an epiphytic orchid in the Masdevallia genus of orchids. Its name is derived from the Greek words ion meaning violet and charis meaning grace.

It occurs in the Andean region, from Peru to Bolivia.

== Description ==
Masdevallia ionocharis is a medium-sized plant with paddle shaped leaves and flowers held on erect peduncles at or just above the level of the leaves, which blooms in the summer with a single 2.5 cm wide flower.

== Cultivation ==
Masdevallia ionocharis should be grown in cool temperatures. It can be grown potted in sphagnum moss, with the potting medium being kept moist.

== Discovery ==
Masdevallia ionocharis was found in 1875 by Walter Davis in the Andean valley of Sandia, in the province of Carabaya, Peru, at 9,000 ft (2,700 m) elevation), where he was collecting plants for James Veitch & Sons.
