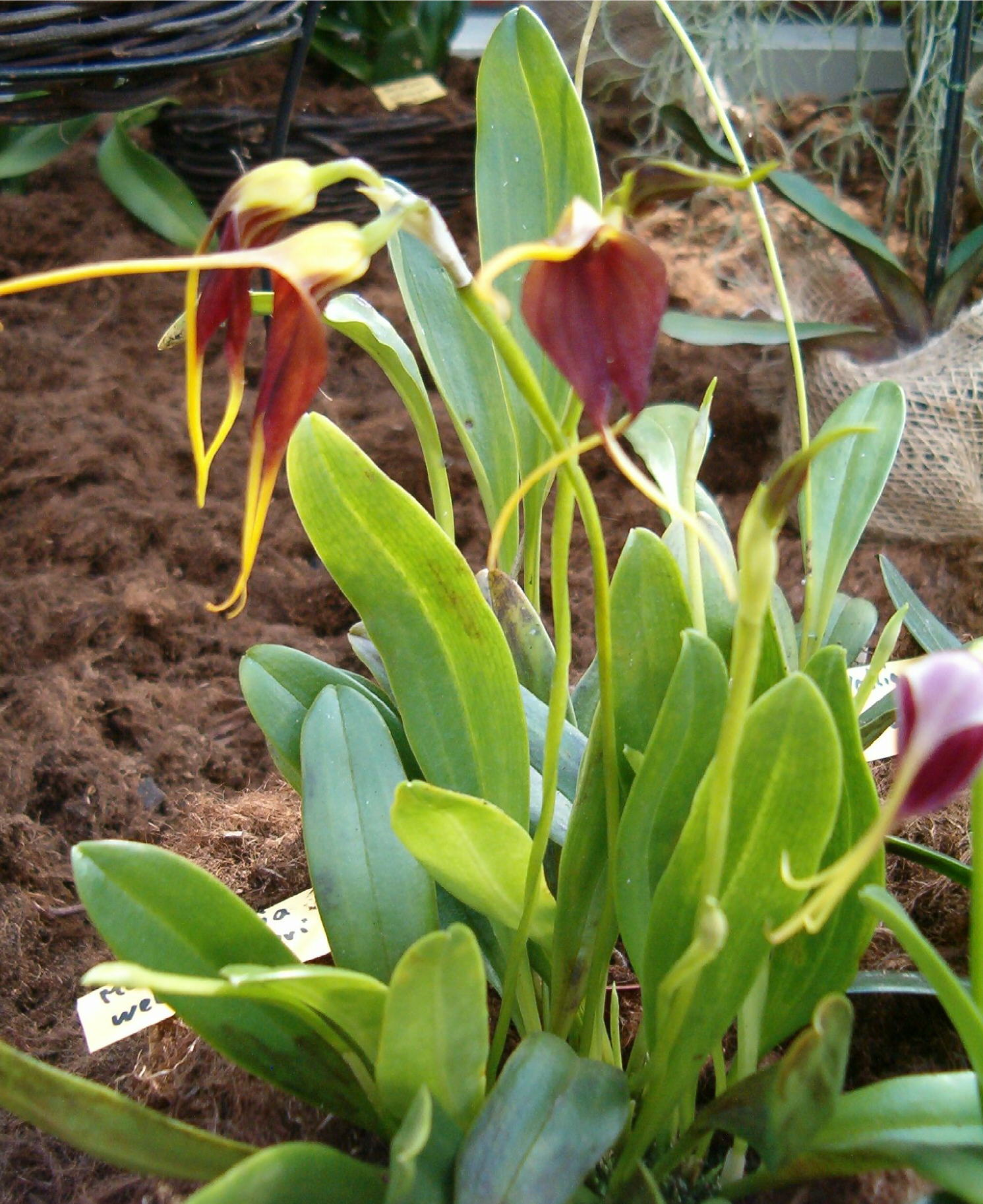

Scientific classification
- Kingdom: Plantae
- Clade: Embryophytes
- Clade: Tracheophytes
- Clade: Spermatophytes
- Clade: Angiosperms
- Clade: Monocots
- Order: Asparagales
- Family: Orchidaceae
- Subfamily: Epidendroideae
- Genus: Masdevallia
- Subgenus: Masdevallia subg. Polyantha
- Section: Masdevallia sect. Alaticaules
- Species: M. weberbaueri

Binomial name
- Masdevallia weberbaueri Schltr.

Synonyms
- Masdevallia moyobambae Königer

= Masdevallia weberbaueri =

Species of plant

Masdevallia weberbaueri is a species of orchid found from southern Ecuador into northern Peru.
