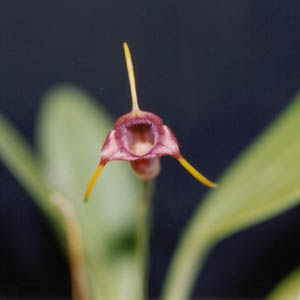

Scientific classification
- Kingdom: Plantae
- Clade: Tracheophytes
- Clade: Angiosperms
- Clade: Monocots
- Order: Asparagales
- Family: Orchidaceae
- Subfamily: Epidendroideae
- Genus: Masdevallia
- Subgenus: Masdevallia subg. Masdevallia
- Section: Masdevallia sect. Masdevallia
- Subsection: Masdevallia subsect. Saltatrices
- Species: M. ventricularia

Binomial name
- Masdevallia ventricularia Rchb.f.

Synonyms
- Masdevallia filaria Luer & R.Escobar

= Masdevallia ventricularia =

Species of orchid

Masdevallia ventricularia is a species of orchid occurring from Colombia to northwestern Ecuador.
