= Aulicus =

Scientific classification
- Domain: Eukaryota
- Kingdom: Animalia
- Phylum: Arthropoda
- Class: Insecta
- Order: Coleoptera
- Suborder: Polyphaga
- Infraorder: Cucujiformia
- Family: Cleridae
- Subfamily: Clerinae
- Genus: Aulicus; Spinola, 1841

Synonyms
- Serriger Spinola, 1841; Xenoclerus Schenkling, 1902

Genus of beetles

Aulicus is a genus of checkered beetles in the family Cleridae. There are about 14 described species in Aulicus.

== Species ==
These 14 species belong to the genus Aulicus:

- Aulicus antennatus Schaeffer, 1921
- Aulicus apachei
- Aulicus bicinctus Linsley, 1936
- Aulicus dentipes Schaeffer, 1921
- Aulicus edwardsi (Horn, 1880)
- Aulicus edwardsii
- Aulicus femoralis Schaeffer, 1917
- Aulicus fissipes Schaeffer, 1921
- Aulicus humeralis Linsley, 1936
- Aulicus monticola Gorham, 1882
- Aulicus nero Spinola, 1844
- Aulicus nigriventris Schaeffer, 1921
- Aulicus reichei (Spinola, 1844)
- Aulicus terrestris Linsley, 1933
