= M. floribunda =

M. floribunda may refer to:

- Maackia floribunda, a legume native to East Asia
- Maerua floribunda, an African plant
- Magnolia floribunda, a plant with flower buds in enclosed bracts
- Malus floribunda, a plant native to East Asia
- Manilkara floribunda, a manilkara tree
- Maniltoa floribunda, a legume endemic to Fiji
- Masdevallia floribunda, a North American orchid
- Michelia floribunda, an evergreen plant
- Myrciaria floribunda, a fruit tree
