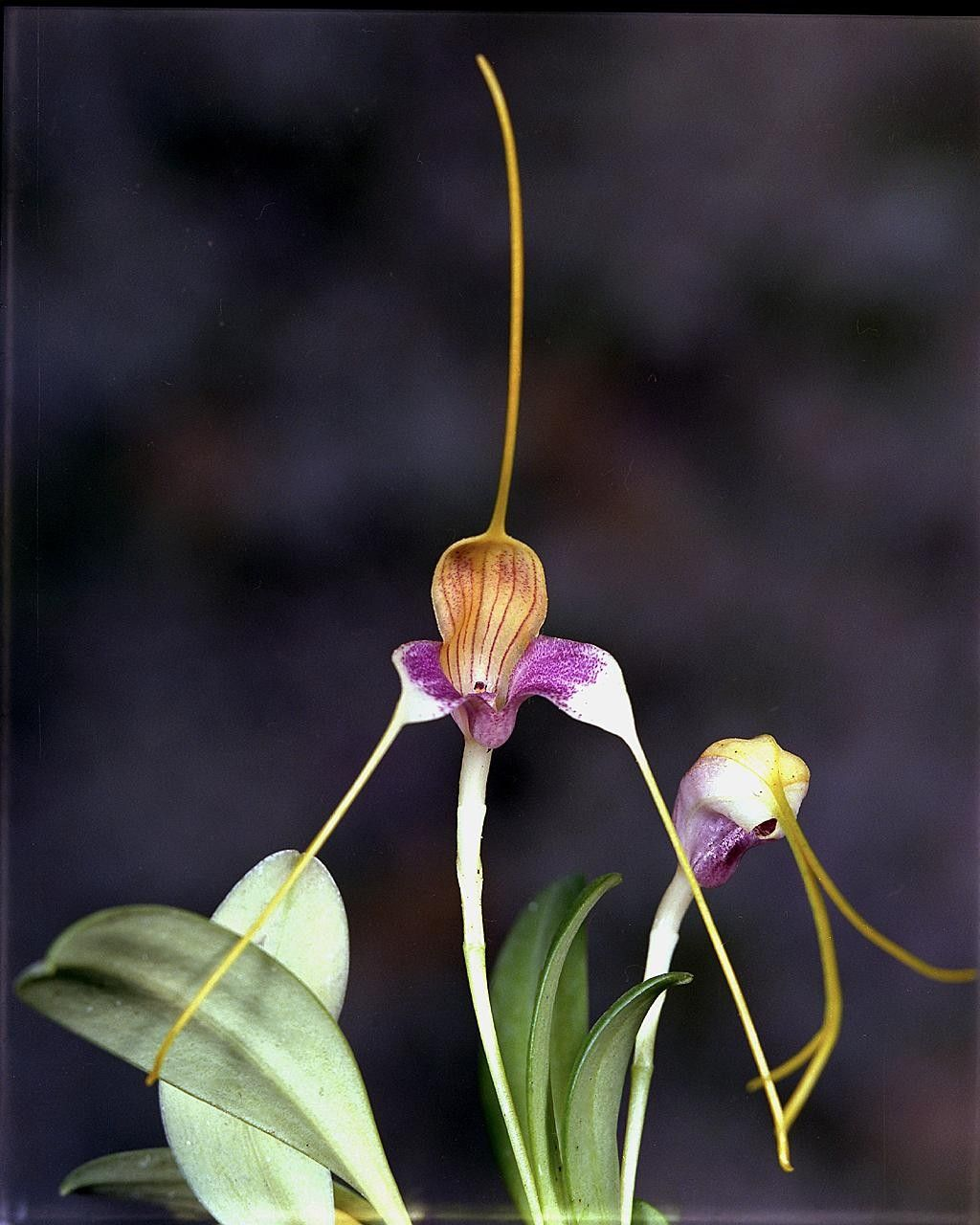
- Masdevallia caudata

Scientific classification
- Kingdom: Plantae
- Clade: Tracheophytes
- Clade: Angiosperms
- Clade: Monocots
- Order: Asparagales
- Family: Orchidaceae
- Subfamily: Epidendroideae
- Tribe: Epidendreae
- Subtribe: Pleurothallidinae
- Genus: Masdevallia; Ruiz & Pav.

Subgenera
- About one dozen, see text

Diversity
- About 500 species

Synonyms
- Acinopetala Luer; Alaticaulia Luer; Rodrigoa Braas; Portillia Königer; Jostia Luer; Buccella Luer; Byrsella Luer; Fissia (Luer) Luer; Luzama Luer; Megema Luer; Petalodon Luer; Regalia Luer; Reichantha Luer; Spectaculum Luer; Spilotantha Luer; Streptoura Luer; Triotosiphon Schltr. ex Luer; Zahleria Luer

= Masdevallia =

Genus of orchids

Masdevallia, abbreviated Masd in horticultural trade, is a large genus of flowering plants of the Pleurothallidinae, a subtribe of the orchid family (Orchidaceae). There are over 500 species, grouped into several subgenera. The genus is named for Jose Masdevall (?-1801), a physician and botanist in the court of Charles III of Spain.

== Range and morphology ==
These plants are found from Mexico to southern Brazil, but mostly in the higher regions (2,500-4,000 m ASL) of the Andes of Ecuador and Colombia, Peru and Bolivia. They may be epiphytes, terrestrials or growing as lithophytes on damp rocks.

The plants are characterized by an abbreviated to elongate and creeping rhizome that gives rise to stems that lack pseudobulbs. The stem bears a single, fleshy, erect to pendent, ovate to lanceolate leaf. The flowers are triangular and occur singly or in racemose inflorescences. They are characterized by a showy calyx and reduced corolla. The sepals are fused at the base and frequently caudate. The petals flank the semiterete column and the tongue-shaped lip is flexibly hinged to a free column foot.

== Cultivation ==
The species are sensitive to inappropriate cultural conditions and will show signs of stress by leaf spotting or dropping. They can generally be grown in pots with sphagnum or seedling grade wood chips although a few species produce descending inflorescences and are best accommodated in baskets. In both cases the rhizome should remain at the surface of the medium in order to prevent rot.

Most of these plants are from high altitude cloud forests and require very cool conditions and abundant moisture throughout the year. They cannot tolerate dryness, low humidity, or excessive temperatures and the plants are very easy to kill. They will simply drop all their leaves and suddenly collapse if allowed to dry completely or are exposed to high temperatures. Many members of this genus from very high altitude cloud forests defy cultivation. Most of the species from this genus are considered less difficult in cultivation than plants from the genus Dracula, and some of them are very easy to cultivate and have a 'weedy' habit such as Veitch's masdevallia, but the majority of these species are usually very difficult to maintain in cultivation unless the plants can be kept cool and moist all the time.

Low humidity conditions or watering the plants with a water source which contains high levels of dissolved salts will result in the leaves yellowing and rapidly dying from the tips back to the rhizome. The plants should be provided with rain water or distilled water or a very pure water source. The medium should always remain moist as the plants do not have any significant storage structures like most orchids.

== Selected species ==
- Masdevallia antonii
- Masdevallia davisii – Davis' masdevallia, orchid of the sun, qoriwaqanki (Quechua)
- Masdevallia pinocchio
- Masdevallia unguentum
- Masdevallia veitchiana – Veitch's masdevallia, king of the masdevallias, gallo-gallo (Spanish), waqanki (Quechua)

== Taxonomy ==
Masdevallia was found to be polyphyletic and the taxonomy of the group is unresolved but the currently accepted taxonomy proceeds as follows:

=== Subgenera ===
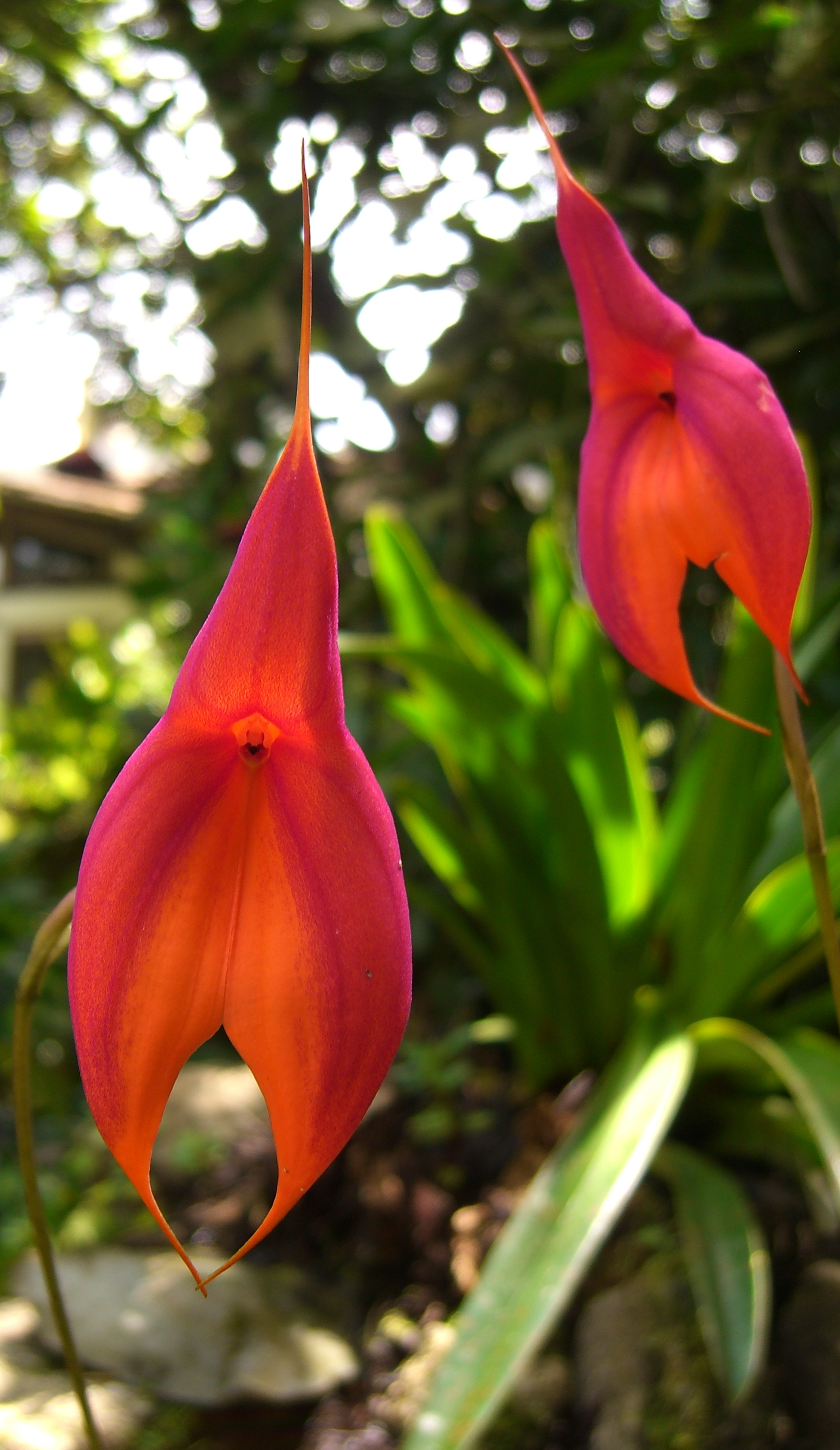
Veitch's masdevallia, Masdevallia (Masdevallia) veitichiana, is in section Masdevallia, subsection Coccineae

- Subgenus Amanda (≡Spilotantha)
  - Section Amandae: 28+ species, e.g. M. amanda, M. bulbophyllopsis, M. melanopus, M. polysticta. Separated in Spilotantha.
  - Section Ophioglossae: 1-2 species – M. ophioglossa, M. ophioglossa ssp. grossa
- Subgenus Cucullatia: (≡Megema)4 species – M. cerastes, M. corniculata, M. cucullata, M. macrura
- Subgenus Fissia: (≡Fissia) 3 species – M. mutica, M. picturata, M. pleurothalloides
- Subgenus Masdevallia
  - Section Amaluzae: (≡Luzama) 6 species, e.g. M. amaluzae, M. carmenensis, M. patula
  - Section Aphanes: (≡Pteroon) 3 species – M. aphanes, M. capillaris, M. scopaea
  - Section Coriaceae :
    - Subsection Coriaceae: (≡Byrsella) ~35 species, e.g. M. angulata, M. caesia, M. civilis, M. elephanticeps, M. foetens, M. fractiflexa
    - Subsection Durae: (≡Regalia) 4 species – M. ayabacana, M. dura, M. panguiensis, M. utriculata
  - Section Ligiae: Monotypic – M. ligiae
  - Section Masdevallia:
    - Subsection Caudatae: ~28 species, e.g. M. bottae, M. caudata, M. decumana, M. lychniphora, M. triangularis, M. xanthina
    - Subsection Coccineae: 12 species, e.g. M. amabilis, M. barlaeana, M. coccinea, M. ignea, M. veitchiana
    - Subsection Masdevallia: ~58 species, e.g. M. agaster, M. calocodon, M. mejiana, M. pumila, M. uniflora
    - Subsection Oscillantes: ~11 species, e.g. M. andreettana, M. wageneriana (including M. pteroglossa)
    - Subsection Saltatrices: 14 species, e.g. M. angulifera, M. constricta, M. limax, M. saltatrix, M. urosalpinx, M. ventricularia
    - Subsection Tubulosae: 7 species, e.g. M. bangii, M. irapana, M. tubulosa
  - Section Mentosae: Monotypic – M. mentosa
  - Section Minutae: ~21 species, e.g. M. floribunda, M. herradurae, M. minuta, M. nicaraguae, M. wendlandiana
  - Section Racemosae: (≡Spectaculum) Monotypic – M. racemosa
  - Section Reichenbachianae:
    - Subsection Dentatae : (≡Petalodon) 2 species – M. collina, M. macrogenia
    - Subsection Reichenbachianae: (≡Reichantha) ~11 species, e.g. M. rolfeana, M. schroderiana, M. striatella
- Subgenus Meleagris: (≡Rodrigoa) 7 species, e.g. M. anisomorpha, M. heteroptera, M. meleagris
- Subgenus Nidifica: (≡Buccella) 4-5 species: e.g. M. dynastes, M. nidifica (including M. ventricosa)
- Subgenus Polyantha (≡Alaticaulia)
  - Section Alaticaules: 97 species, e.g. M. bicolor, M. infracta, M. scobina, M. stenorrhynchos, M. tovarensis, M. vargasii, M. weberbaueri
  - Section Polyanthae: 7 species, e.g. M. discoidea, M. lata, M. polyantha, M. schlimii
- Subgenus Scabripes (≡Portilla)
- Subgenus Volvula (≡Streptoura)
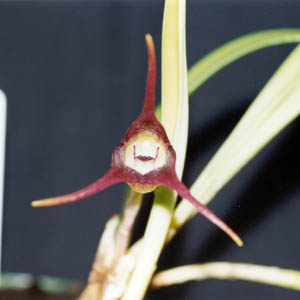
Masdevallia (Masdevallia) sect. Coriaceae subsect. Coriaceae:
Masdevallia civilis

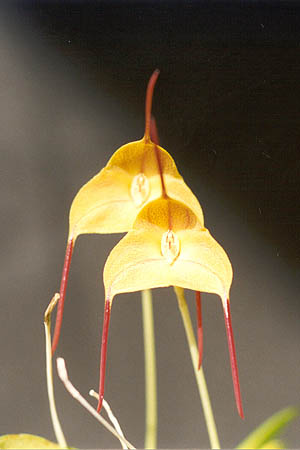
Masdevallia (Masdevallia) sect. Masdevallia subsect. Caudatae:
Masdevallia triangularis

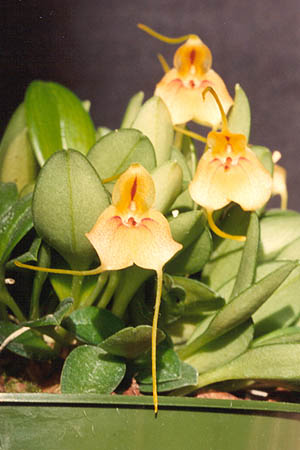
Masdevallia (Masdevallia) sect. Masdevallia subsect. Oscillantes:
Masdevallia wageneriana var. pteroglossa

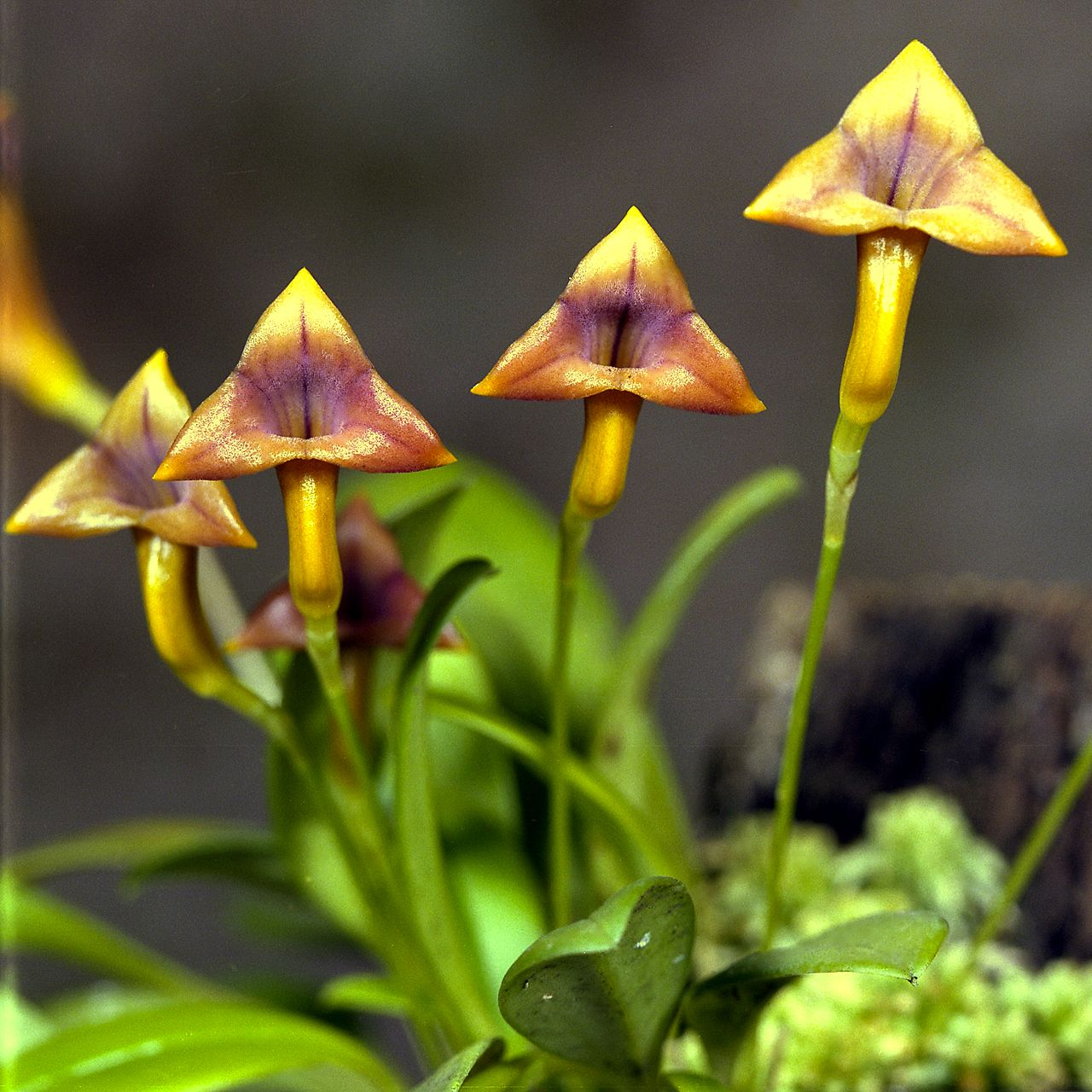
Masdevallia (Masdevallia) sect. Masdevallia subsect. Saltatrices:
Masdevallia angulifera

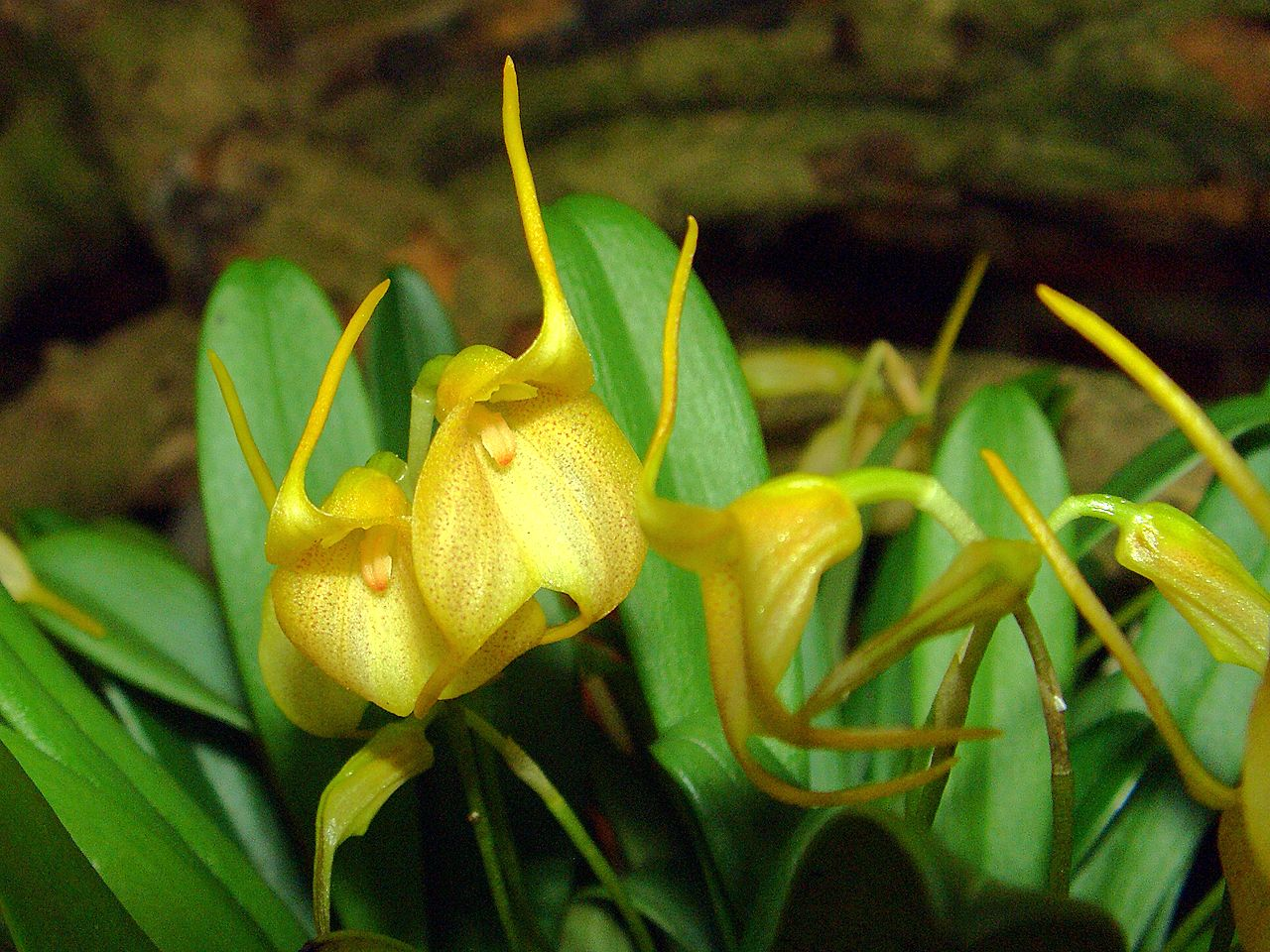
Masdevallia (Masdevallia) sect. Minutae:
Masdevallia floribunda

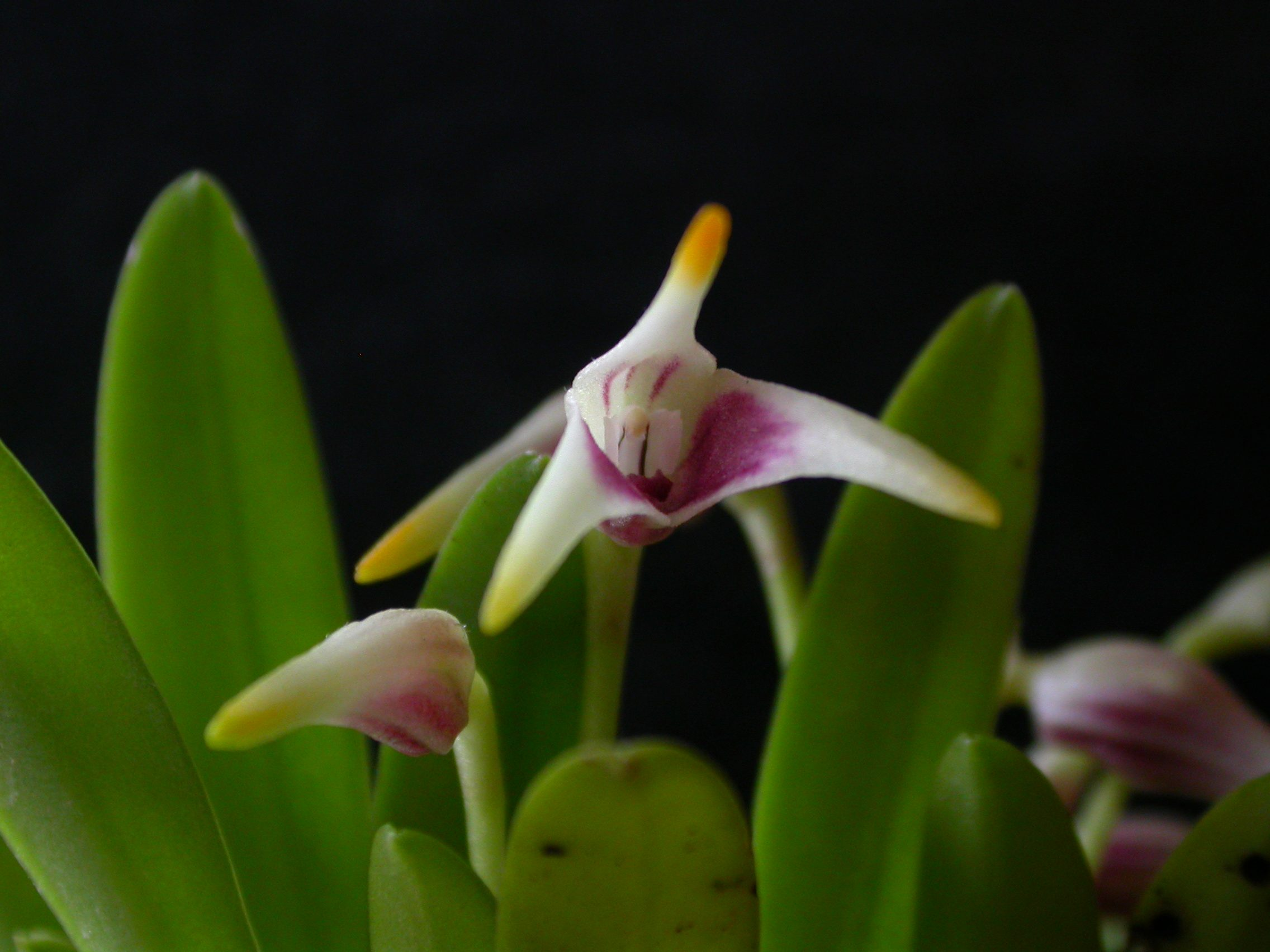
Masdevallia (Masdevallia) sect. Minutae:
Masdevallia wendlandiana

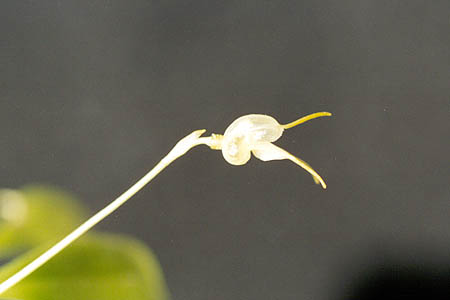
Masdevallia (Nidifica):
Masdevallia nidifica

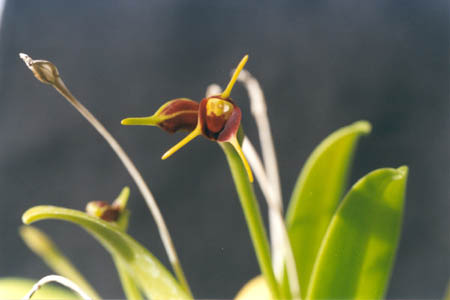
Masdevallia (Polyantha) sect. Alaticaules:
Masdevallia bicolor

== Footnotes ==
- Gerritsen, Mary E. & Parsons, Ron (2005): Masdevallias, Gems of the Orchid World. Timber Press.
- Luer, Carlyle A.: Icones Pleurothallidinarum, Systematics of Masdevallia (multiple volumes). Missouri Botanical Garden Press. (1984–2003)
- Pridgeon, A.M., Solano, R., & Chase, M.W. (2001): Phylogenetic relationships in Pleurothallidinae (Orchidaceae): combined evidence from nuclear and plastid DNA sequences. American Journal of Botany 88: 2286–2308.
