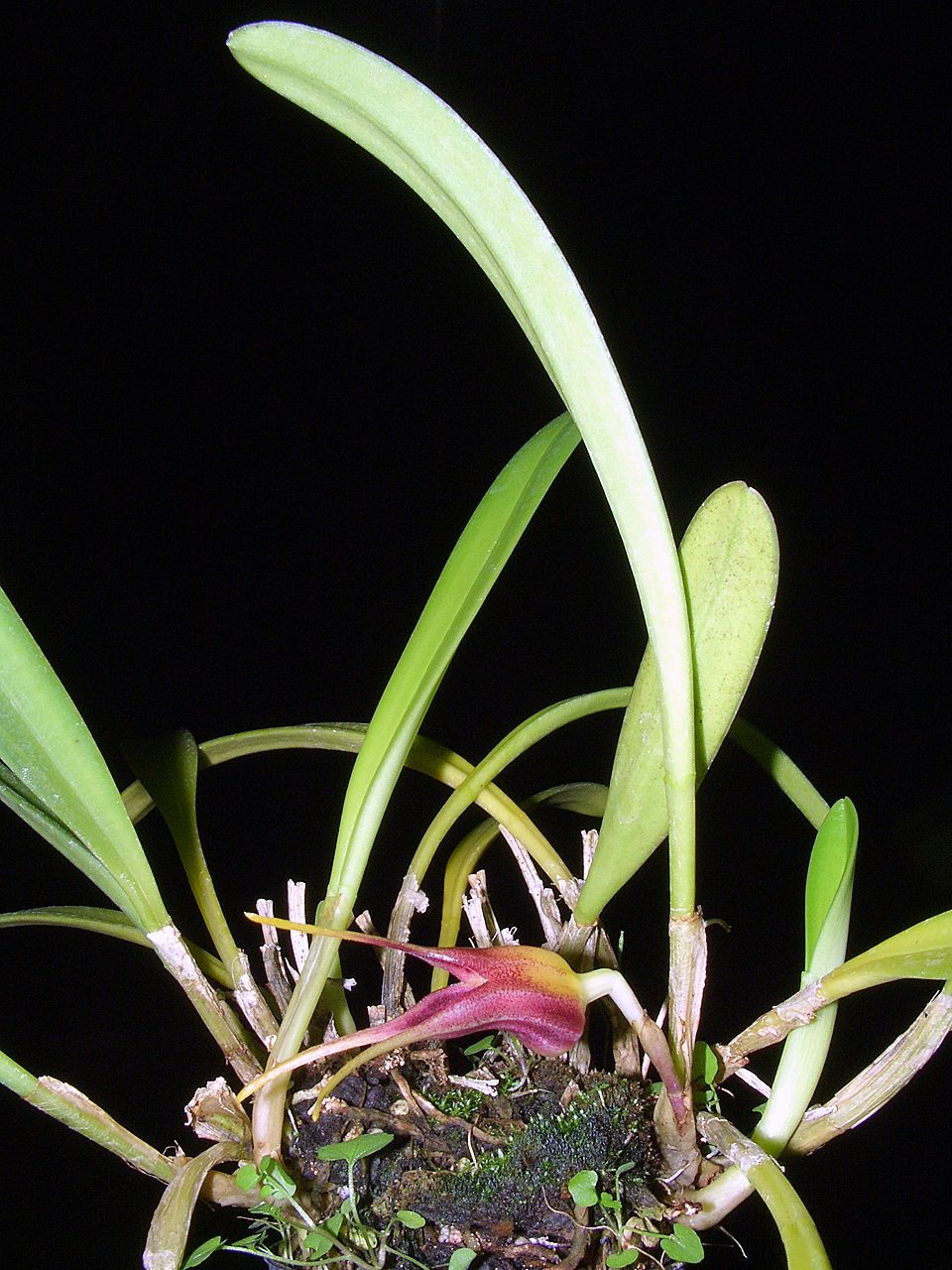

Scientific classification
- Kingdom: Plantae
- Clade: Tracheophytes
- Clade: Angiosperms
- Clade: Monocots
- Order: Asparagales
- Family: Orchidaceae
- Subfamily: Epidendroideae
- Genus: Masdevallia
- Subgenus: Masdevallia subg. Masdevallia
- Section: Masdevallia sect. Coriaceae
- Subsection: Masdevallia subsect. Coriaceae
- Species: M. civilis

Binomial name
- Masdevallia civilis Rchb.f. & Warsz.

Synonyms
- Masdevallia leontoglossa Rchb.f.; Masdevallia aequiloba Regel; Masdevallia fragrans Woolward

= Masdevallia civilis =

Species of plant

Masdevallia civilis is a species of orchid occurring from Venezuela to Peru.
