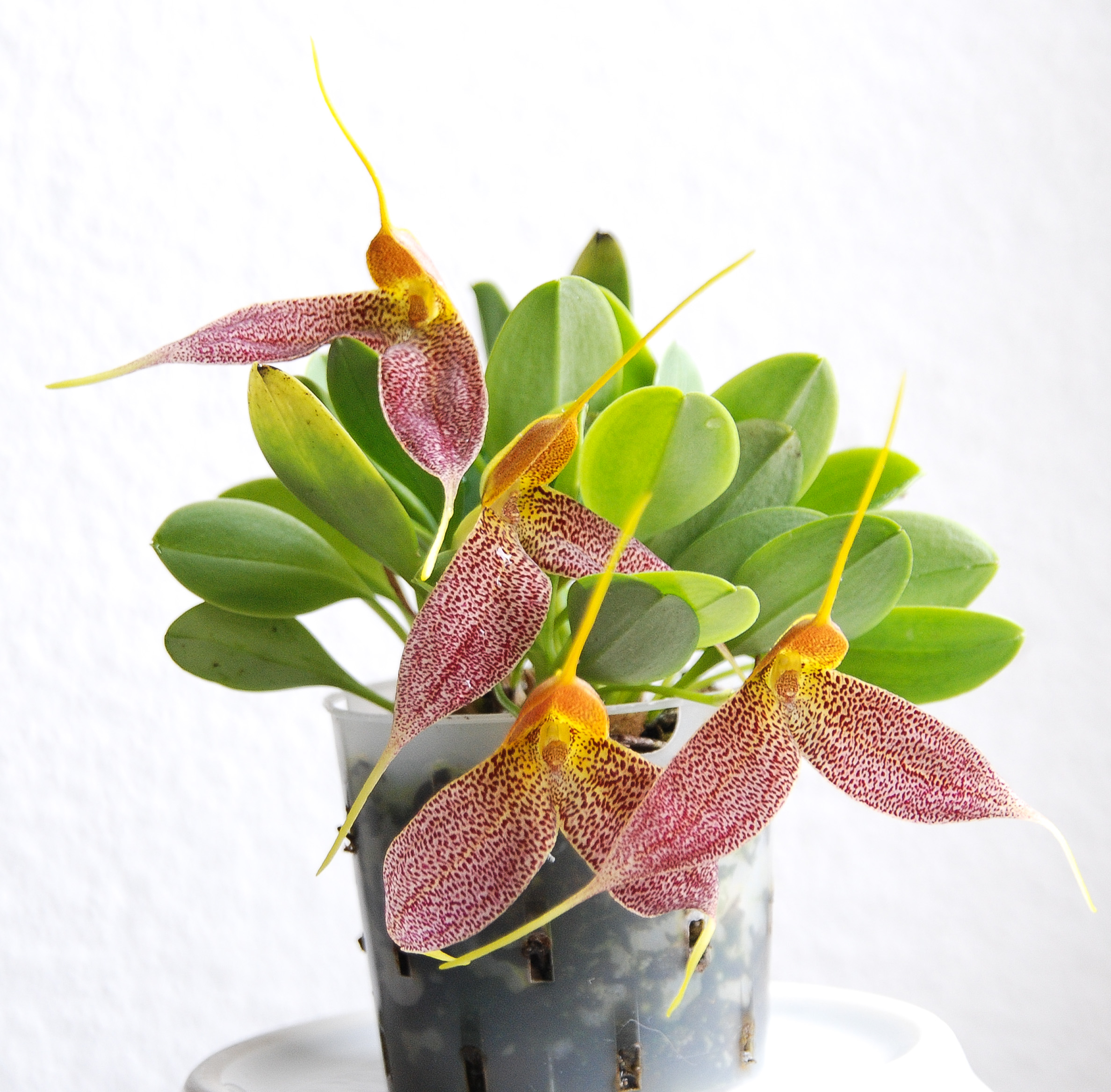

Scientific classification
- Kingdom: Plantae
- Clade: Tracheophytes
- Clade: Angiosperms
- Clade: Monocots
- Order: Asparagales
- Family: Orchidaceae
- Subfamily: Epidendroideae
- Genus: Masdevallia
- Subgenus: Masdevallia subg. Masdevallia
- Section: Masdevallia sect. Masdevallia
- Subsection: Masdevallia subsect. Caudatae
- Species: M. decumana

Binomial name
- Masdevallia decumana Königer

= Masdevallia decumana =

Species of orchid

Masdevallia decumana, the good-looking masdevallia, is a species of orchid in the genus Masdevallia.
