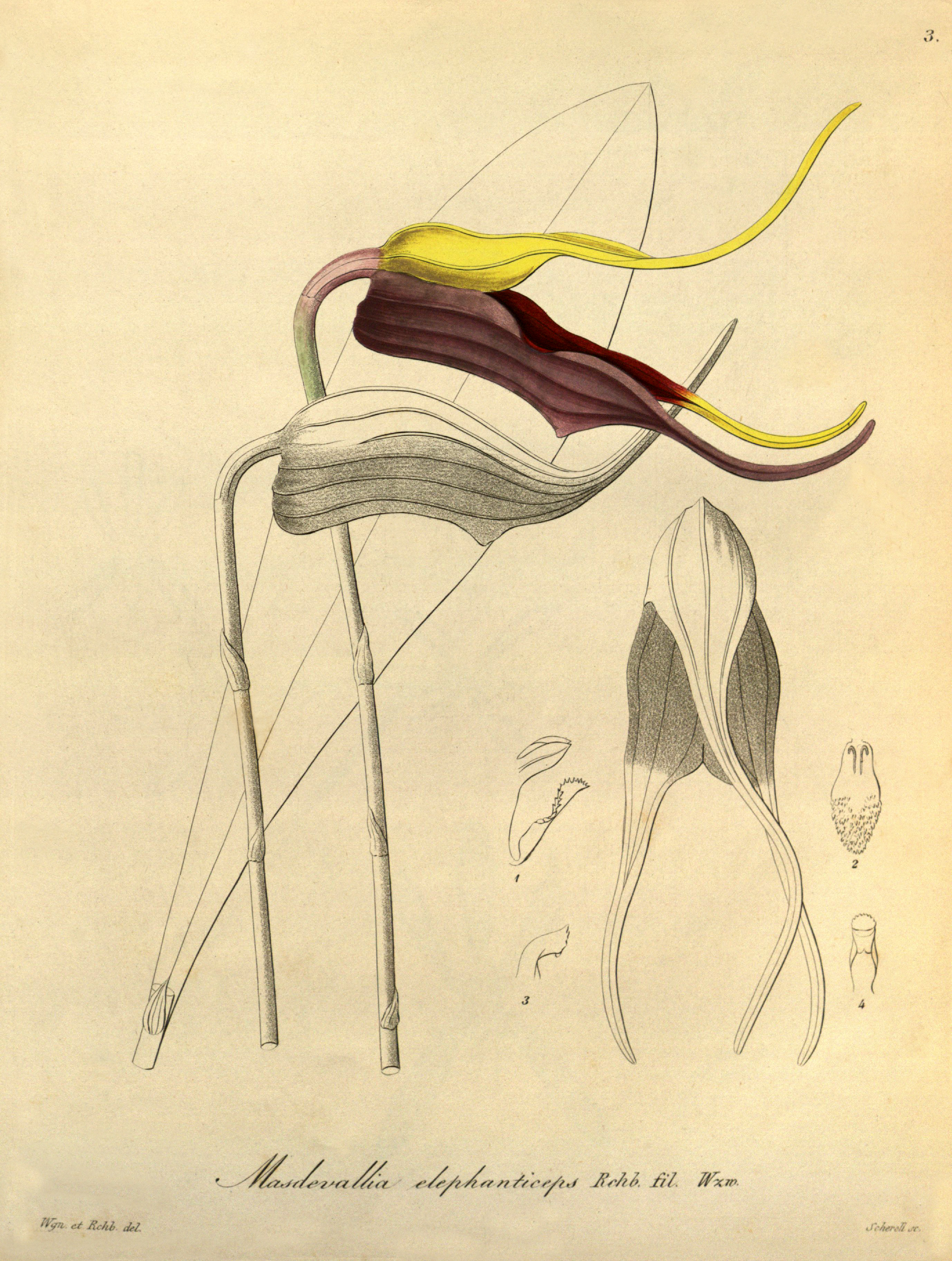

Scientific classification
- Kingdom: Plantae
- Clade: Tracheophytes
- Clade: Angiosperms
- Clade: Monocots
- Order: Asparagales
- Family: Orchidaceae
- Subfamily: Epidendroideae
- Genus: Masdevallia
- Subgenus: Masdevallia subg. Masdevallia
- Section: Masdevallia sect. Coriaceae
- Subsection: Masdevallia subsect. Coriaceae
- Species: M. elephanticeps

Binomial name
- Masdevallia elephanticeps Rchb.f. & Warsz.

Synonyms
- Byrsella elephanticeps (Rchb.f. & Warsz.) Luer

= Masdevallia elephanticeps =

Species of orchid

Masdevallia elephanticeps is a species of orchid occurring at high elevations in the Cordillera Oriental of Colombia.
