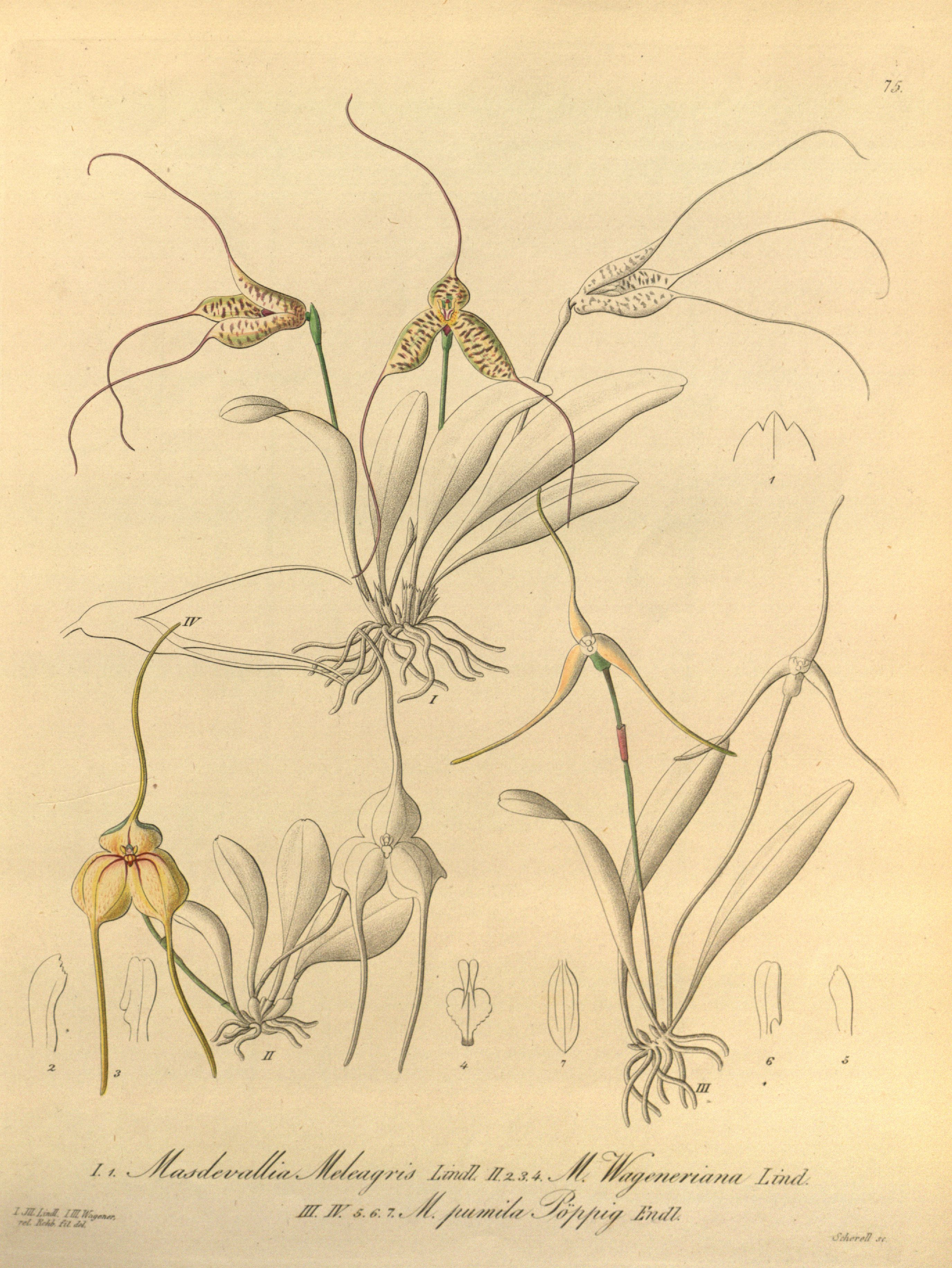

Scientific classification
- Kingdom: Plantae
- Clade: Tracheophytes
- Clade: Angiosperms
- Clade: Monocots
- Order: Asparagales
- Family: Orchidaceae
- Subfamily: Epidendroideae
- Genus: Masdevallia
- Subgenus: Masdevallia subg. Meleagris
- Species: M. meleagris

Binomial name
- Masdevallia meleagris Lindl.

Synonyms
- Rodrigoa meleagris (Lindl.) Braas

= Masdevallia meleagris =

Species of orchid

Masdevallia meleagris is a species of orchid endemic to Colombia.
