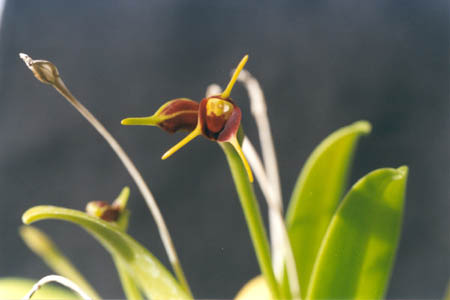

Scientific classification
- Kingdom: Plantae
- Clade: Tracheophytes
- Clade: Angiosperms
- Clade: Monocots
- Order: Asparagales
- Family: Orchidaceae
- Subfamily: Epidendroideae
- Genus: Masdevallia
- Subgenus: Masdevallia subg. Polyantha
- Section: Masdevallia sect. Alaticaules
- Species: M. bicolor

Binomial name
- Masdevallia bicolor Poepp. & Endl.

Synonyms
- Masdevallia auropurpurea Rchb.f. & Warsz.; Masdevallia atropurpurea Rchb.f.; Masdevallia biflora E.Morren; Masdevallia peruviana Rolfe; Masdevallia herzogii Schltr.; Masdevallia subumbellata Kraenzl.; Masdevallia xanthura Schltr.

= Masdevallia bicolor =

Species of orchid

Masdevallia bicolor is a South American species of Masd in the family Orchidaceae. It is found from Western South America to Northwestern Venezuela.
