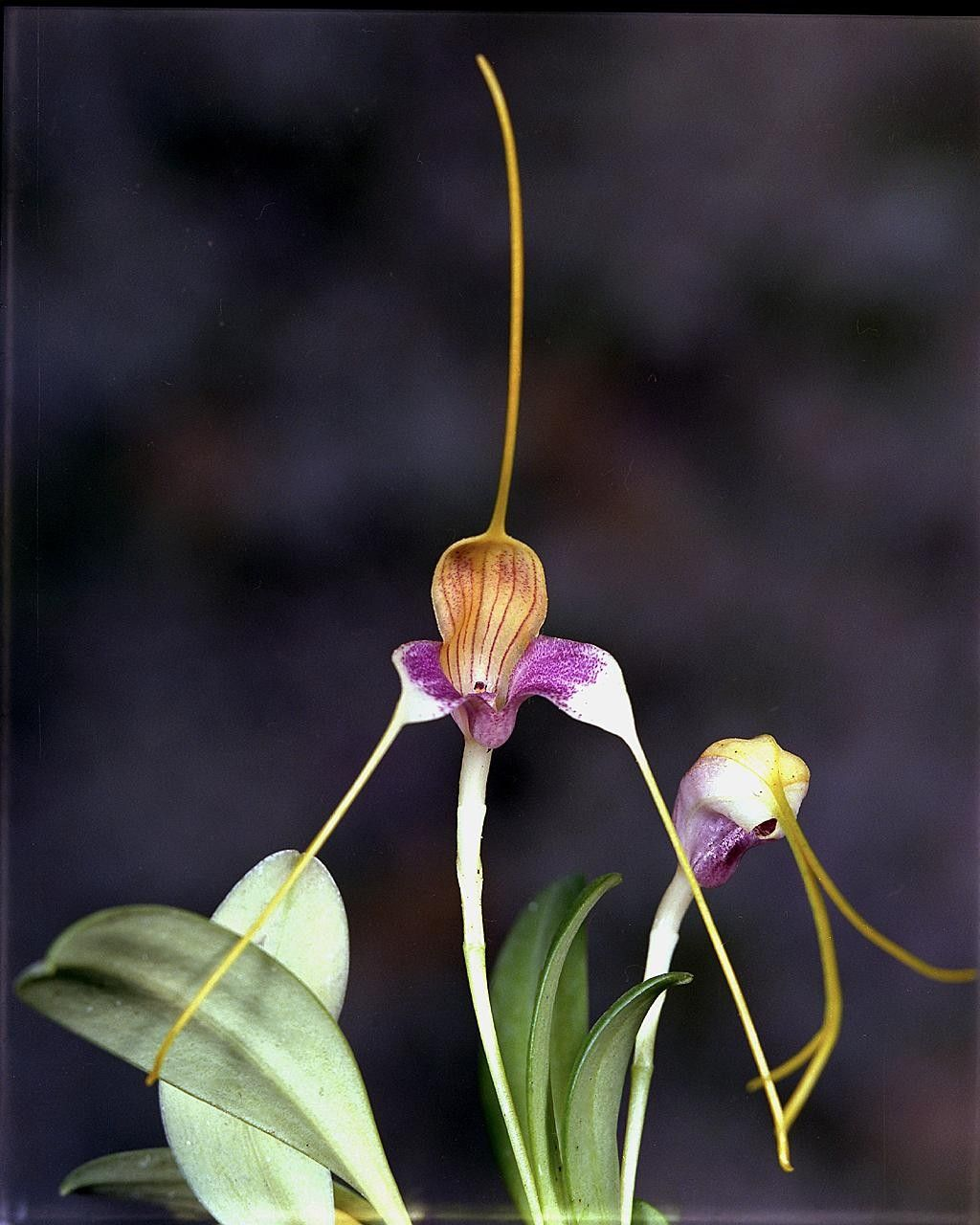

Scientific classification
- Kingdom: Plantae
- Clade: Tracheophytes
- Clade: Angiosperms
- Clade: Monocots
- Order: Asparagales
- Family: Orchidaceae
- Subfamily: Epidendroideae
- Genus: Masdevallia
- Subgenus: Masdevallia subg. Masdevallia
- Section: Masdevallia sect. Masdevallia
- Subsection: Masdevallia subsect. Caudatae
- Species: M. caudata

Binomial name
- Masdevallia caudata Lindl.

Synonyms
- Masdevallia shuttleworthii Rchb.f.; Masdevallia expansa Rchb.f.

= Masdevallia caudata =

Species of orchid

Masdevallia caudata is a species of orchid endemic to easternmost Colombia and adjacent Venezuela.
