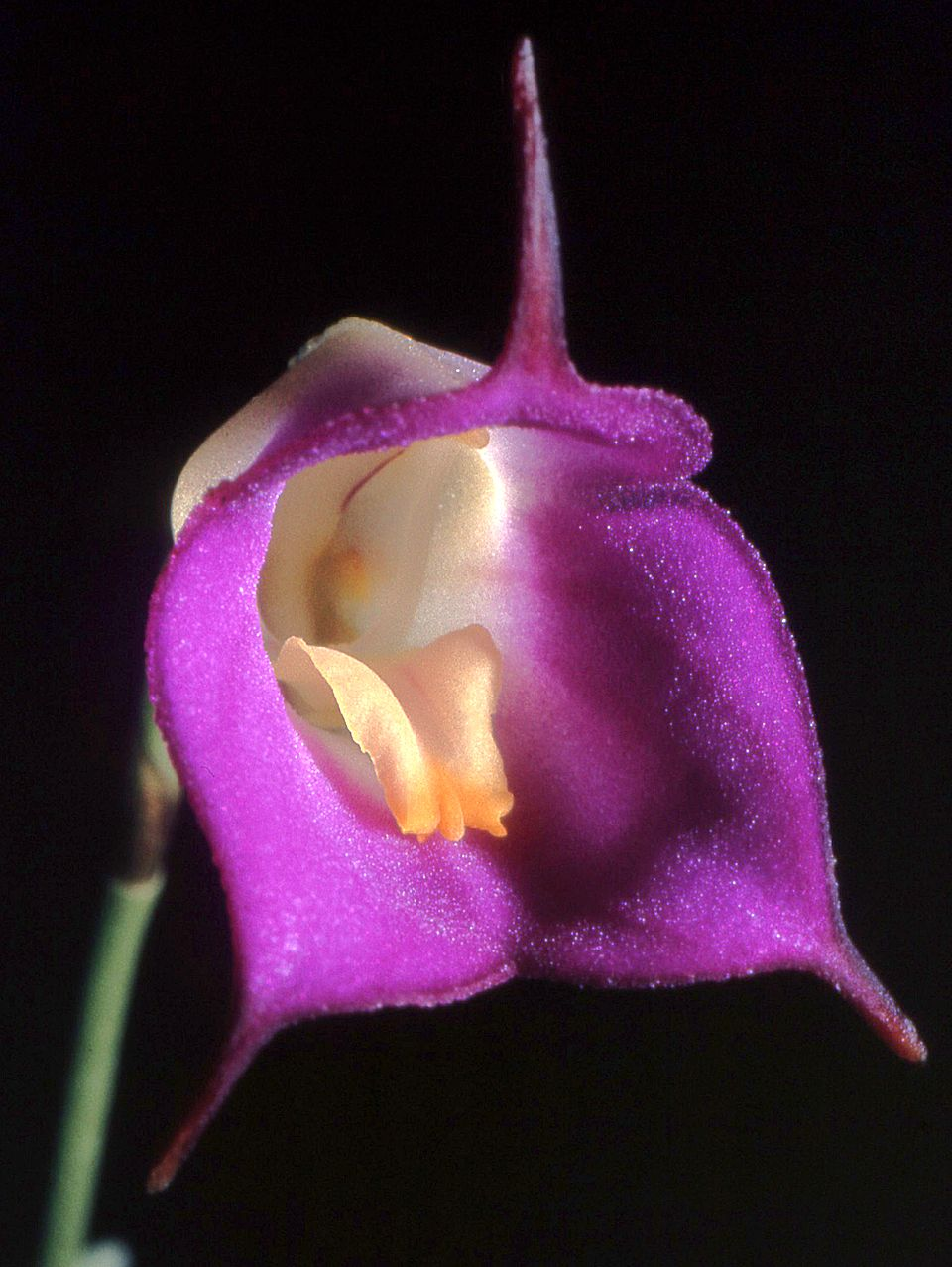

Scientific classification
- Kingdom: Plantae
- Clade: Tracheophytes
- Clade: Angiosperms
- Clade: Monocots
- Order: Asparagales
- Family: Orchidaceae
- Subfamily: Epidendroideae
- Genus: Masdevallia
- Subgenus: Masdevallia subg. Masdevallia
- Section: Masdevallia sect. Masdevallia
- Subsection: Masdevallia subsect. Masdevallia
- Species: M. uniflora

Binomial name
- Masdevallia uniflora Ruiz & Pav.

= Masdevallia uniflora =

Species of orchid

Masdevallia uniflora is a species of orchid in the family Orchidaceae. It is endemic to Peru (Junín). It is the type species of the genus Masdevallia.
