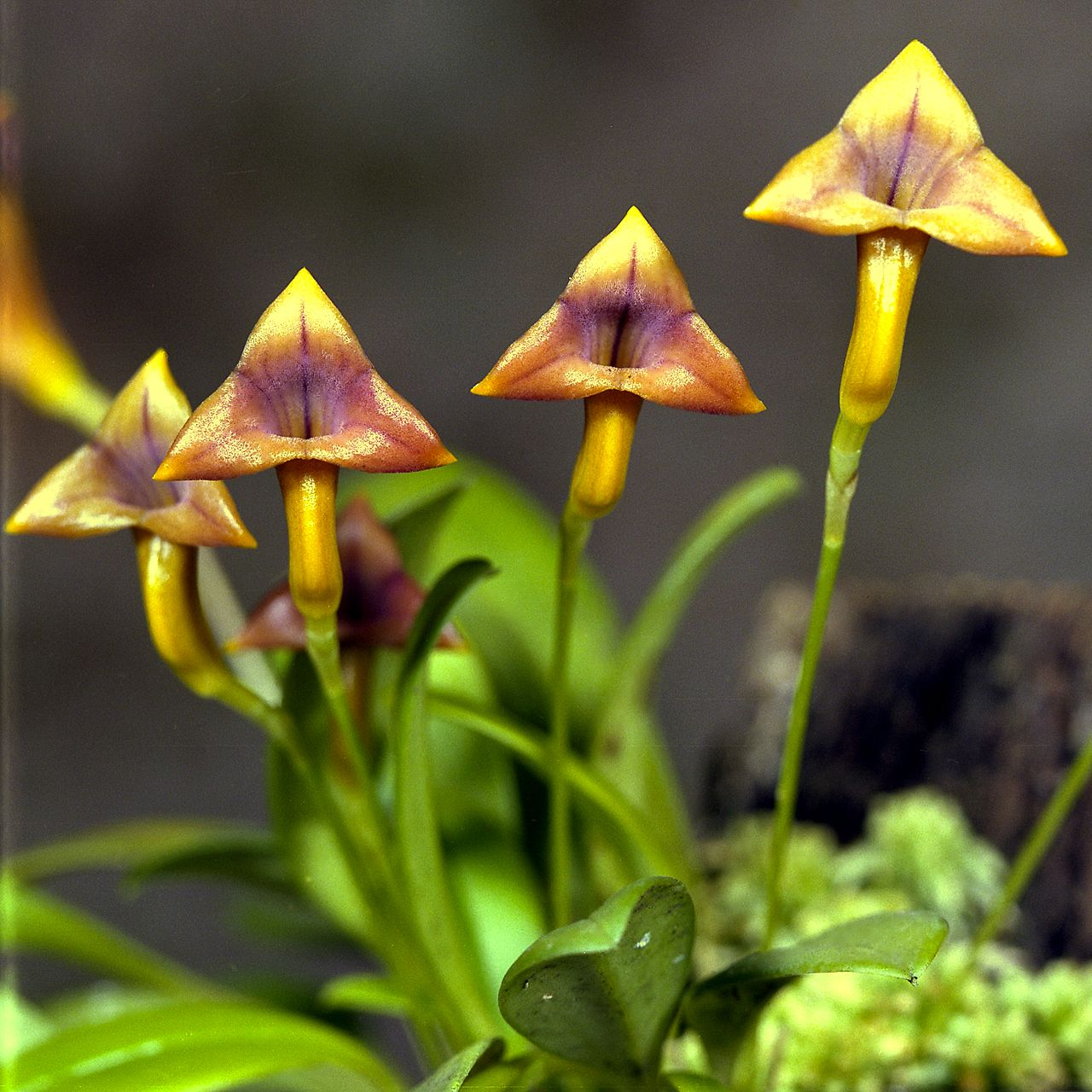

Scientific classification
- Kingdom: Plantae
- Clade: Tracheophytes
- Clade: Angiosperms
- Clade: Monocots
- Order: Asparagales
- Family: Orchidaceae
- Subfamily: Epidendroideae
- Genus: Masdevallia
- Subgenus: Masdevallia subg. Masdevallia
- Section: Masdevallia sect. Masdevallia
- Subsection: Masdevallia subsect. Saltatrices
- Species: M. angulifera

Binomial name
- Masdevallia angulifera Rchb.f. ex Kraenzl.

Synonyms
- Masdevallia olivacea Kraenzl.

= Masdevallia angulifera =

Species of orchid

Masdevallia angulifera is a species of orchid endemic to the Western Cordillera and the Central Cordillera of Colombia in northern South America.
