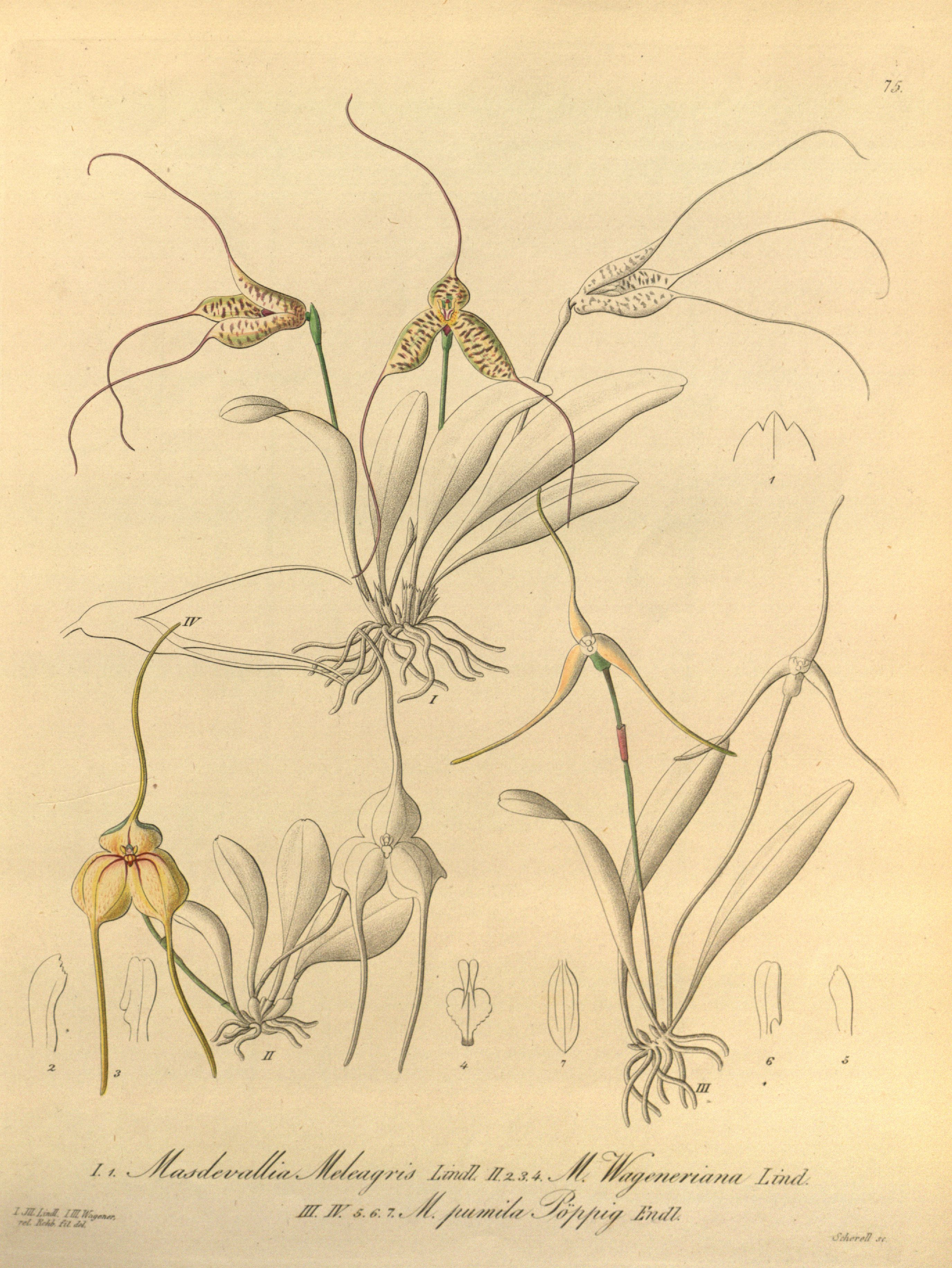
- Masdevallia wageneriana (II)

Scientific classification
- Kingdom: Plantae
- Clade: Tracheophytes
- Clade: Angiosperms
- Clade: Monocots
- Order: Asparagales
- Family: Orchidaceae
- Subfamily: Epidendroideae
- Genus: Masdevallia
- Subgenus: Masdevallia subg. Masdevallia
- Section: Masdevallia sect. Masdevallia
- Subsection: Masdevallia subsect. Oscillantes
- Species: M. wageneriana

Binomial name
- Masdevallia wageneriana Linden ex Lindl.

= Masdevallia wageneriana =

Species of orchid

Masdevallia wageneriana is a species of orchid found from Colombia into northern Venezuela.

Media related to Masdevallia wageneriana at Wikimedia Commons
