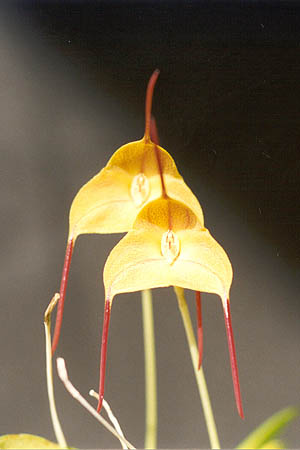

Scientific classification
- Kingdom: Plantae
- Clade: Tracheophytes
- Clade: Angiosperms
- Clade: Monocots
- Order: Asparagales
- Family: Orchidaceae
- Subfamily: Epidendroideae
- Genus: Masdevallia
- Subgenus: Masdevallia subg. Masdevallia
- Section: Masdevallia sect. Masdevallia
- Subsection: Masdevallia subsect. Caudatae
- Species: M. triangularis

Binomial name
- Masdevallia triangularis Lindl.

Synonyms
- Masdevallia maculigera Schltr.; Masdevallia affinis ssp. maculigera (Schltr.) Luer

= Masdevallia triangularis =

Species of orchid

Masdevallia triangularis is a species of orchid found from Venezuela to Ecuador. It grows to approximately 10 cm tall, and bears flat, solitary flowers above the leaves. It is more warmth tolerant than many other species in subsection Caudatae, and can be cultivated successfully in intermediate conditions.
