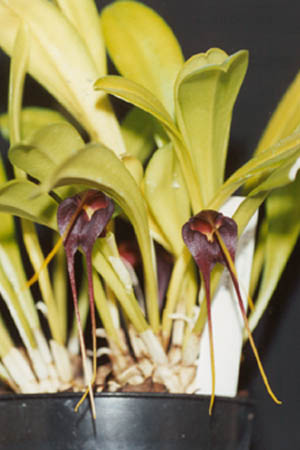

Scientific classification
- Kingdom: Plantae
- Clade: Tracheophytes
- Clade: Angiosperms
- Clade: Monocots
- Order: Asparagales
- Family: Orchidaceae
- Subfamily: Epidendroideae
- Genus: Masdevallia
- Subgenus: Masdevallia subg. Masdevallia
- Section: Masdevallia sect. Reichenbachianae
- Subsection: Masdevallia subsect. Reichenbachianae
- Species: M. rolfeana

Binomial name
- Masdevallia rolfeana Kraenzl.

= Masdevallia rolfeana =

Species of orchid

Masdevallia rolfeana is a species of orchid endemic to Costa Rica.

It is in the Epidendreae family, the reed orchids.
