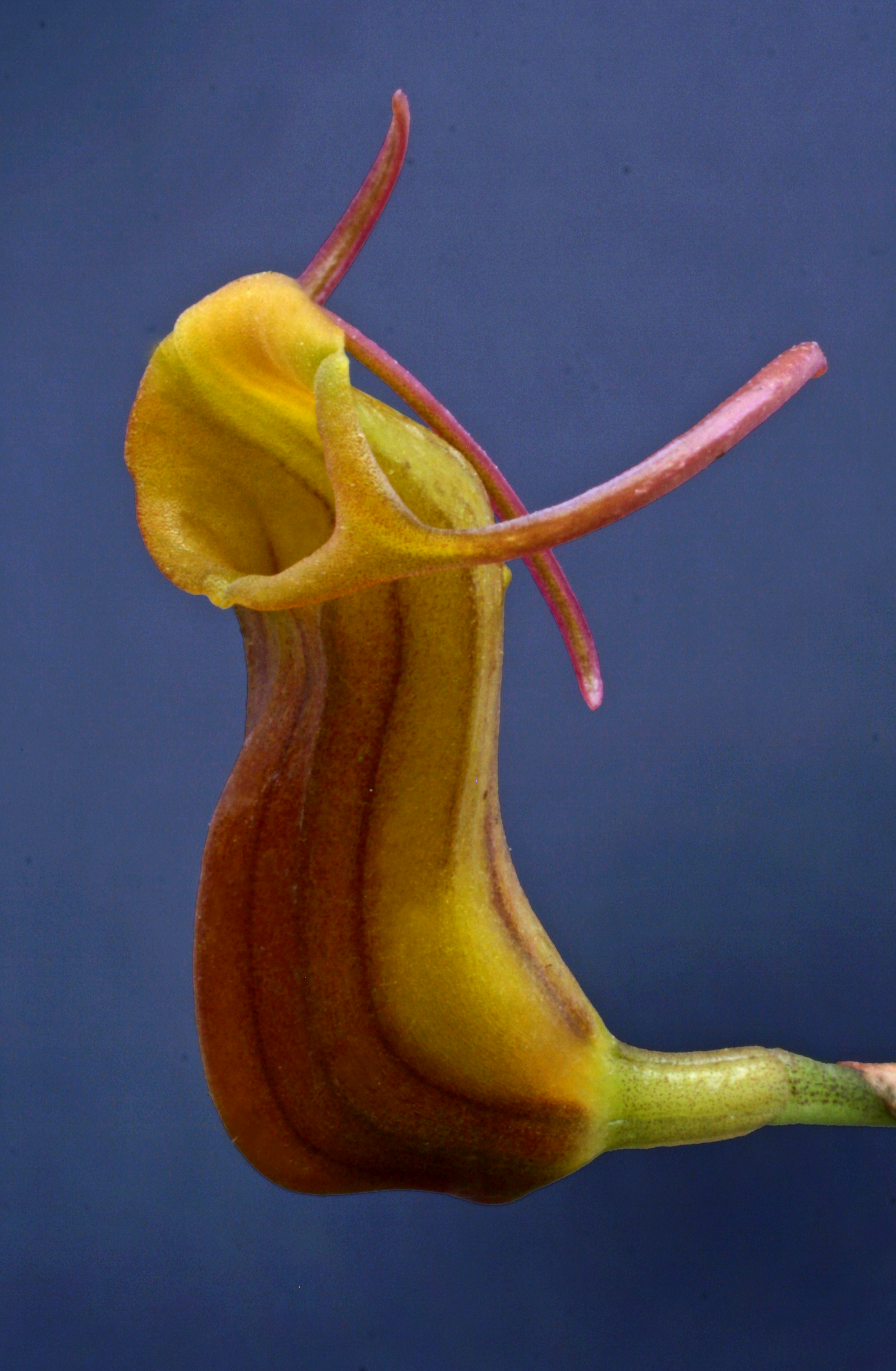
- Masdevallia unguentum flower

Scientific classification
- Kingdom: Plantae
- Clade: Tracheophytes
- Clade: Angiosperms
- Clade: Monocots
- Order: Asparagales
- Family: Orchidaceae
- Subfamily: Epidendroideae
- Genus: Masdevallia
- Species: M. unguentum

Binomial name
- Masdevallia unguentum A.Doucette

= Masdevallia unguentum =

Species of orchid

Masdevallia unguentum was discovered in 2010 in the collection of Finca Dracula and is reported from Colombia. It is morphologically similar to Masdevallia marthae which was also discovered in cultivation without collection data but was later re-discovered in 1993 on the road to a television tower in the Department of Risaralda, Colombia Both are members of the subsection Saltatrices which is characterized by flowers with a tubular calyx.

== Etymology ==
From the Latin "unguentum", an ointment used to perfume the body. The name alludes to the aromatic flowers and their similarity to Masdevallia saltatrix, a species named for female dancers.

Pronunciation: "u - ng - w - ə - nt- (ə) - m"

== Description ==
Masdevallia unguentum is from an unknown origin but most likely originates from Colombia. The species is a miniature, presumably epiphytic, herb with erect, elliptic leaves. The flowers are born singly on thin stems as long as the leaf and emit a spicy fragrance. The species keys out to Masdevallia saltatrix but can easily be distinguished by the odor, striped rather than spotted calyx, and the tail that rests against the back of the tube.

== Cultivation ==
The species can be cultivated like other intermediate to cool (day: 56–64 F; night: 48–56 F) growing masdevallias. They require high humidity (65–95%) with strong air movement to prevent bacterial and fungal infections. Light should be medium to bright shade (600–1400 footcandles). The plants should be reported before the medium breaks down in either a bark based mix or in sphagnum moss. They should be fertilized with a half-strength mixture of a balanced fertilizer once a month and a high nitrogen fertilizer can be used for single applications in the spring and fall.

The plants can be propagated by division or sexually. After pollination the capsule will require about 90 days to mature and the seeds can be grown under aseptic conditions using G & B Orchid Laboratories' Mother Flask Medium V with charcoal or Phytamax Orchid Maintenance Medium. Seedlings require high humidity and should be fertilized every two weeks and may produce their first flowers in 1 to 4 years.
