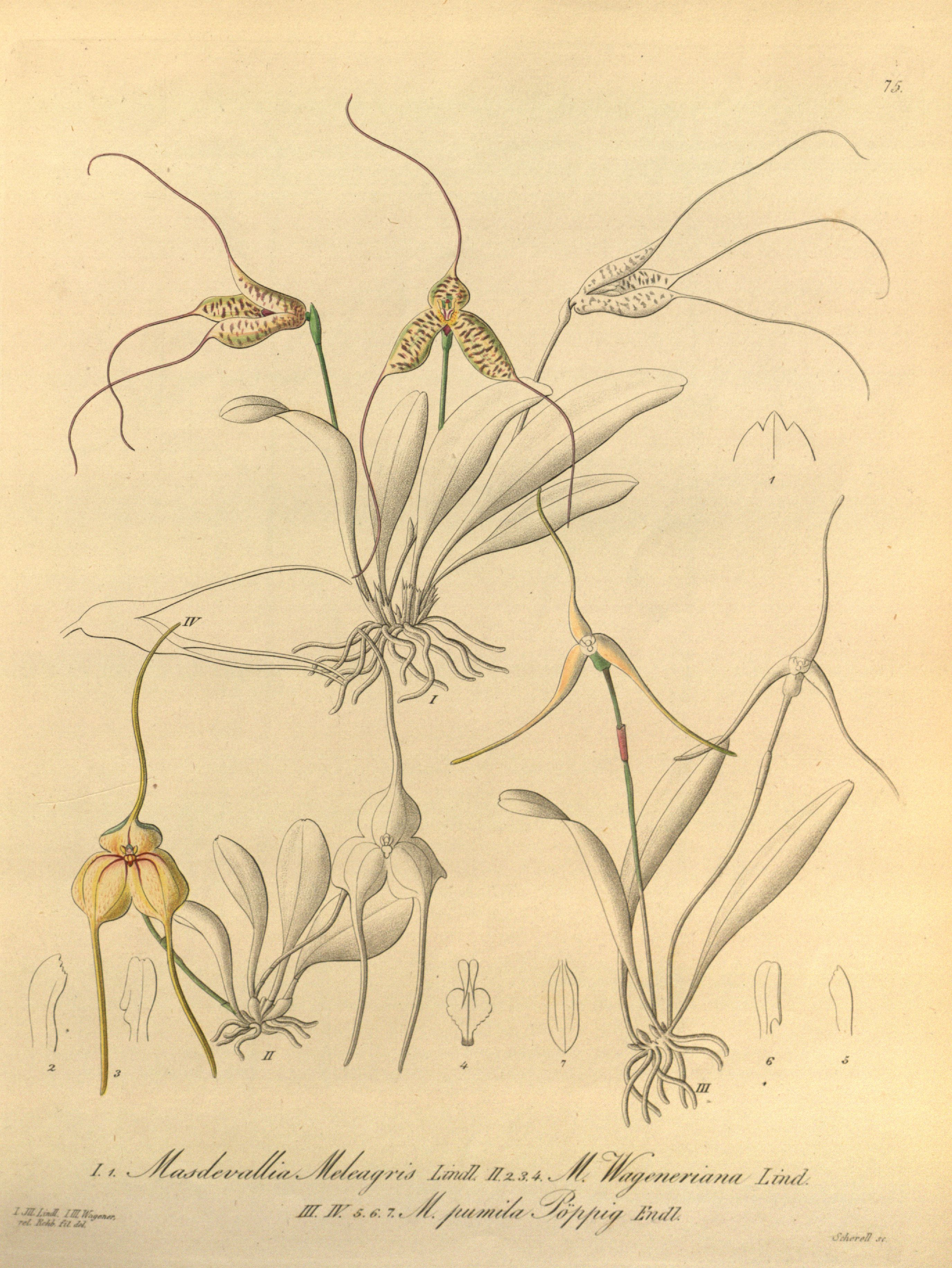
- Masdevallia pumila (III, IV)

Scientific classification
- Kingdom: Plantae
- Clade: Tracheophytes
- Clade: Angiosperms
- Clade: Monocots
- Order: Asparagales
- Family: Orchidaceae
- Subfamily: Epidendroideae
- Genus: Masdevallia
- Subgenus: Masdevallia subg. Masdevallia
- Section: Masdevallia sect. Masdevallia
- Subsection: Masdevallia subsect. Masdevallia
- Species: M. pumila

Binomial name
- Masdevallia pumila Poepp. & Endl.

Synonyms
- Masdevallia filamentosa Kraenzl.; Masdevallia grandiflora C. Schweinf.

= Masdevallia pumila =

Species of orchid

Masdevallia pumila is a species of orchid found from southern Colombia into central Bolivia.
