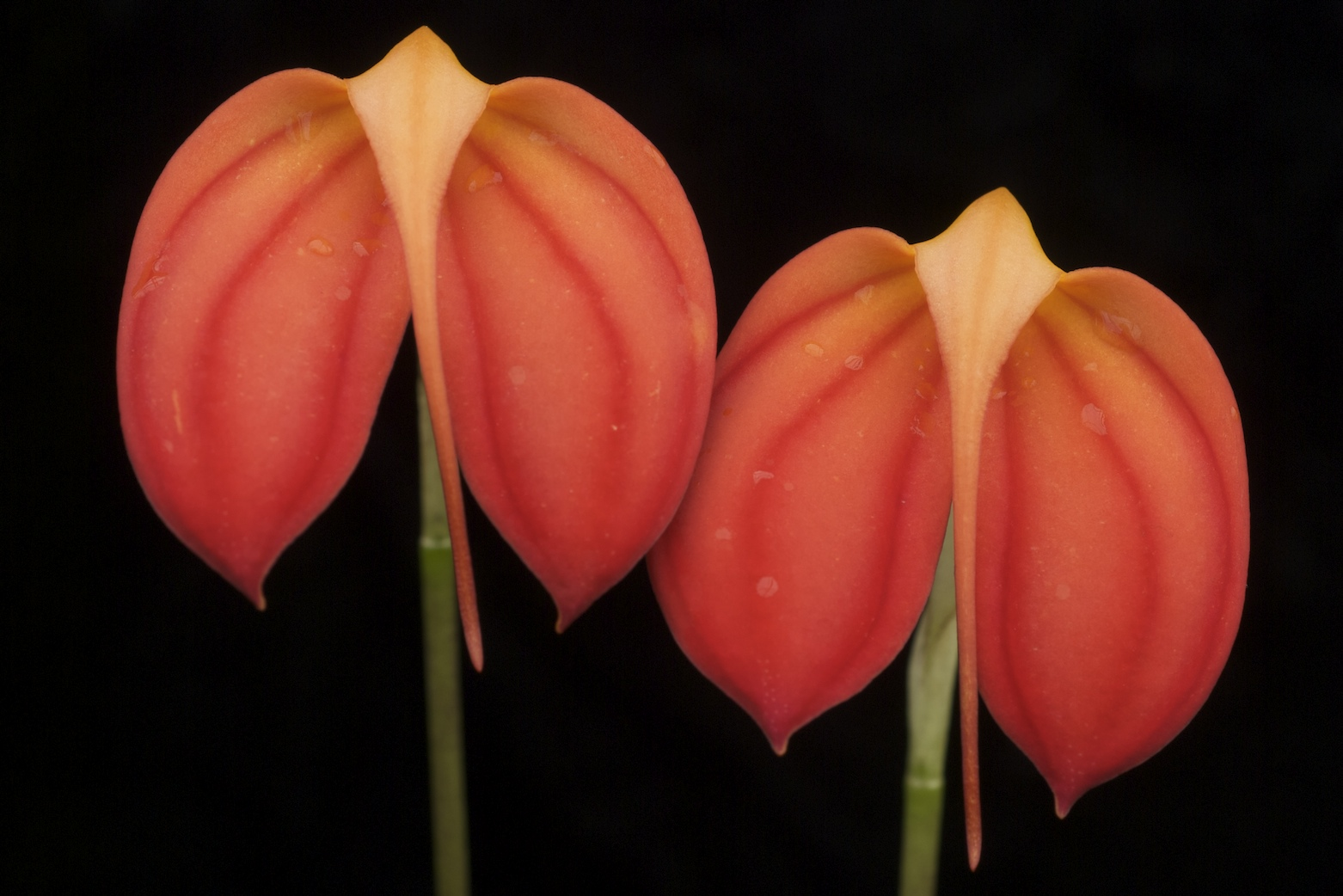

Scientific classification
- Kingdom: Plantae
- Clade: Tracheophytes
- Clade: Angiosperms
- Clade: Monocots
- Order: Asparagales
- Family: Orchidaceae
- Subfamily: Epidendroideae
- Genus: Masdevallia
- Subgenus: Masdevallia subg. Masdevallia
- Section: Masdevallia sect. Masdevallia
- Subsection: Masdevallia subsect. Coccineae
- Species: M. ignea

Binomial name
- Masdevallia ignea Rchb.f.

= Masdevallia ignea =

Species of orchid

Masdevallia ignea is a species of orchid endemic to Colombia.
