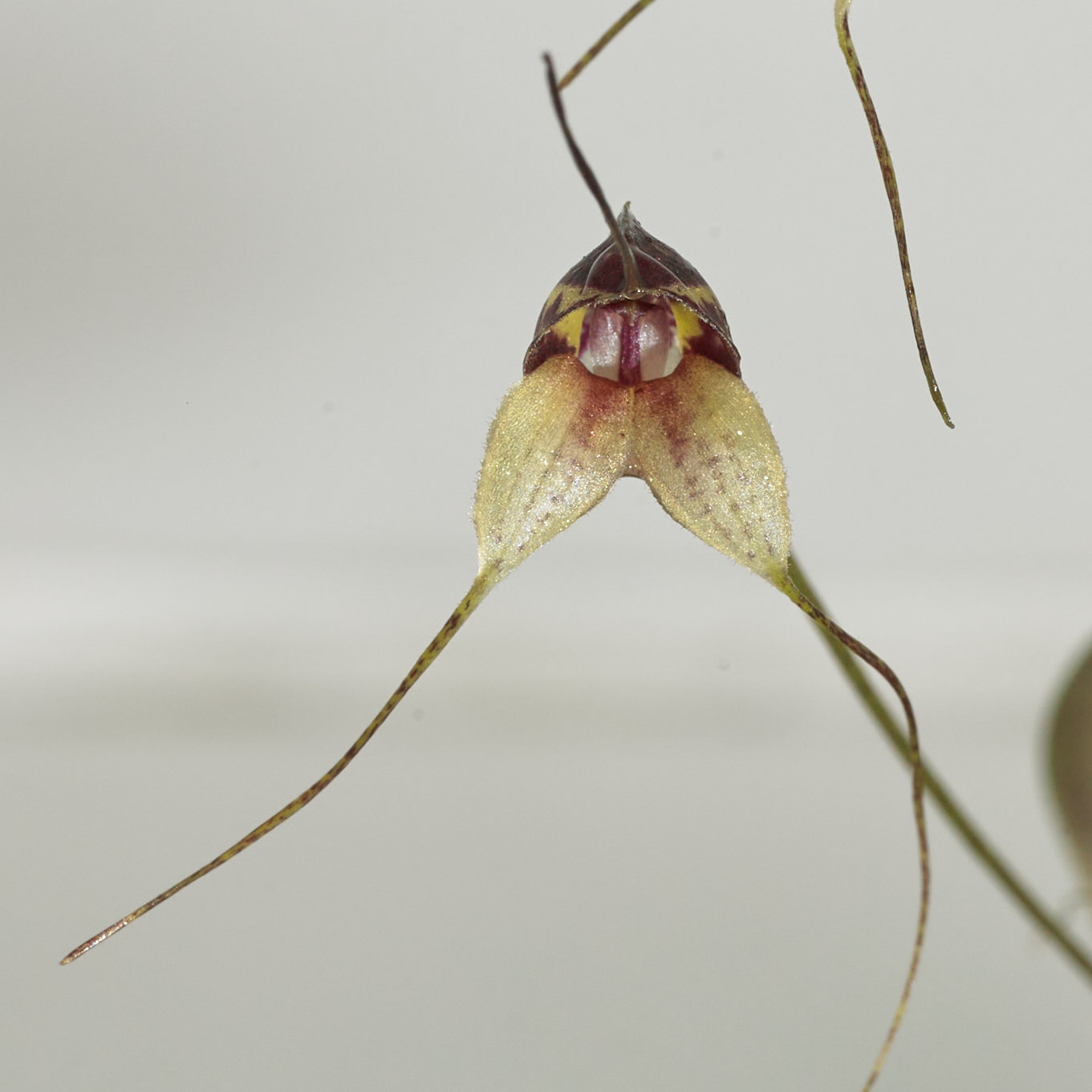

Scientific classification
- Kingdom: Plantae
- Clade: Tracheophytes
- Clade: Angiosperms
- Clade: Monocots
- Order: Asparagales
- Family: Orchidaceae
- Subfamily: Epidendroideae
- Genus: Masdevallia
- Subgenus: Masdevallia subg. Nidifica
- Species: M. nidifica

Binomial name
- Masdevallia nidifica Rchb.f. ex Kraenzl.

Synonyms
- Masdevallia ventricosa Schltr.; Masdevallia cyathogastra Schltr.; Masdevallia tenuicauda Schltr.; Masdevallia strigosa Königer

= Masdevallia nidifica =

Species of plant

Masdevallia nidifica is a species of orchid found from Central America into northern Peru.
