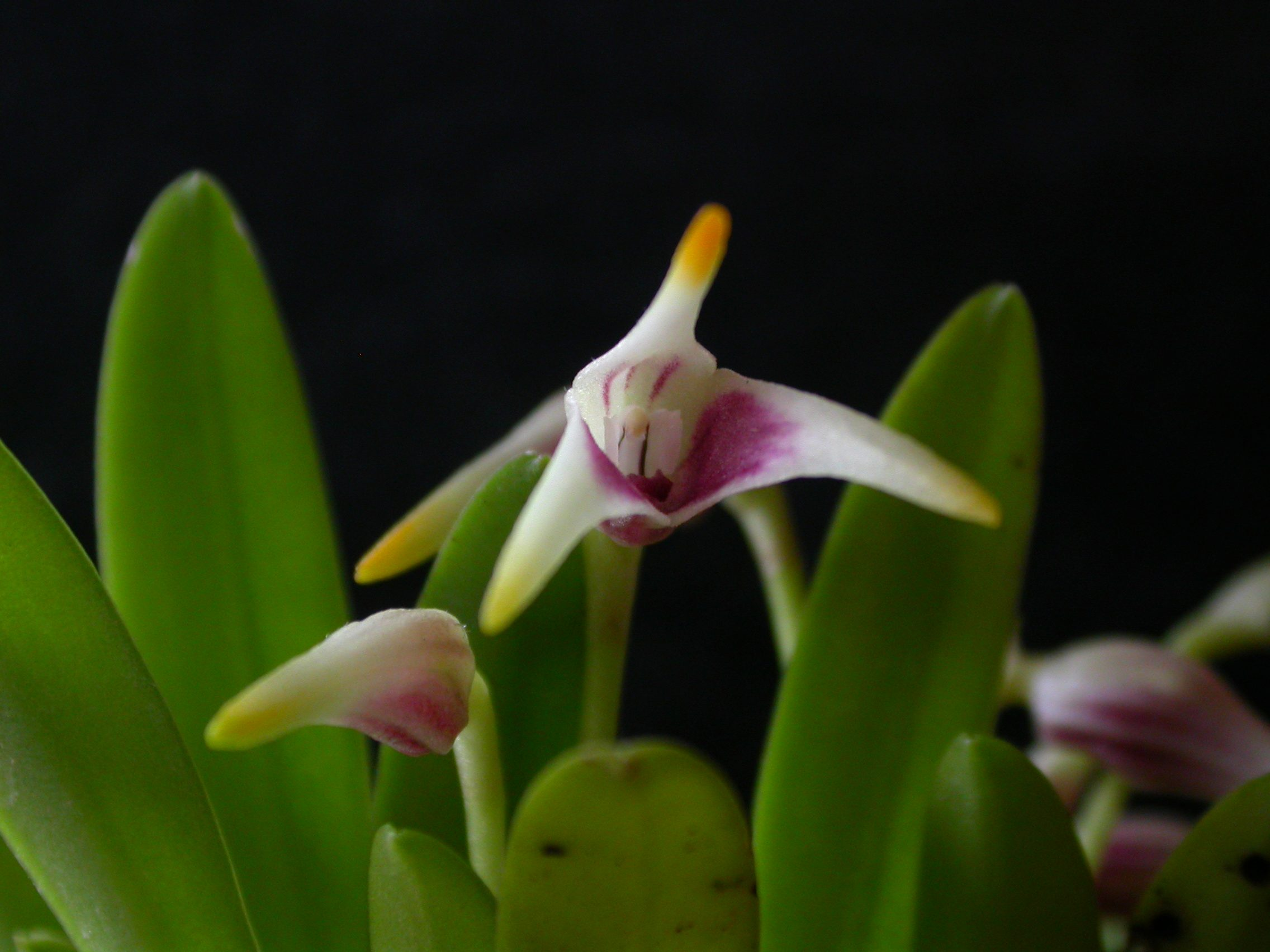

Scientific classification
- Kingdom: Plantae
- Clade: Tracheophytes
- Clade: Angiosperms
- Clade: Monocots
- Order: Asparagales
- Family: Orchidaceae
- Subfamily: Epidendroideae
- Genus: Masdevallia
- Subgenus: Masdevallia subg. Masdevallia
- Section: Masdevallia sect. Minutae
- Species: M. wendlandiana

Binomial name
- Masdevallia wendlandiana Rchb.f.

Synonyms
- Masdevallia yauaperyensis Barb.Rodr.; Masdevallia ulei Schltr.; Masdevallia rodrigueziana Mansf.; Acinopetala wendlandiana (Rchb.f.) Luer

= Masdevallia wendlandiana =

Species of orchid

Masdevallia wendlandiana is a species of orchid native to the tropical South America around Brazil and Peru.

Media related to Masdevallia wendlandiana at Wikimedia Commons
