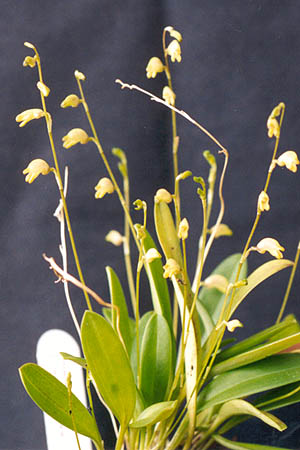

Scientific classification
- Kingdom: Plantae
- Clade: Tracheophytes
- Clade: Angiosperms
- Clade: Monocots
- Order: Asparagales
- Family: Orchidaceae
- Subfamily: Epidendroideae
- Genus: Masdevallia
- Subgenus: Masdevallia subg. Amanda
- Section: Masdevallia sect. Amandae
- Species: M. bulbophyllopsis

Binomial name
- Masdevallia bulbophyllopsis Kraenzl.

Synonyms
- Spilotantha bulbophyllopsis (Kraenzl.) Luer

= Masdevallia bulbophyllopsis =

Species of orchid

Masdevallia bulbophyllopsis is a species of orchid endemic to southwestern Ecuador.
