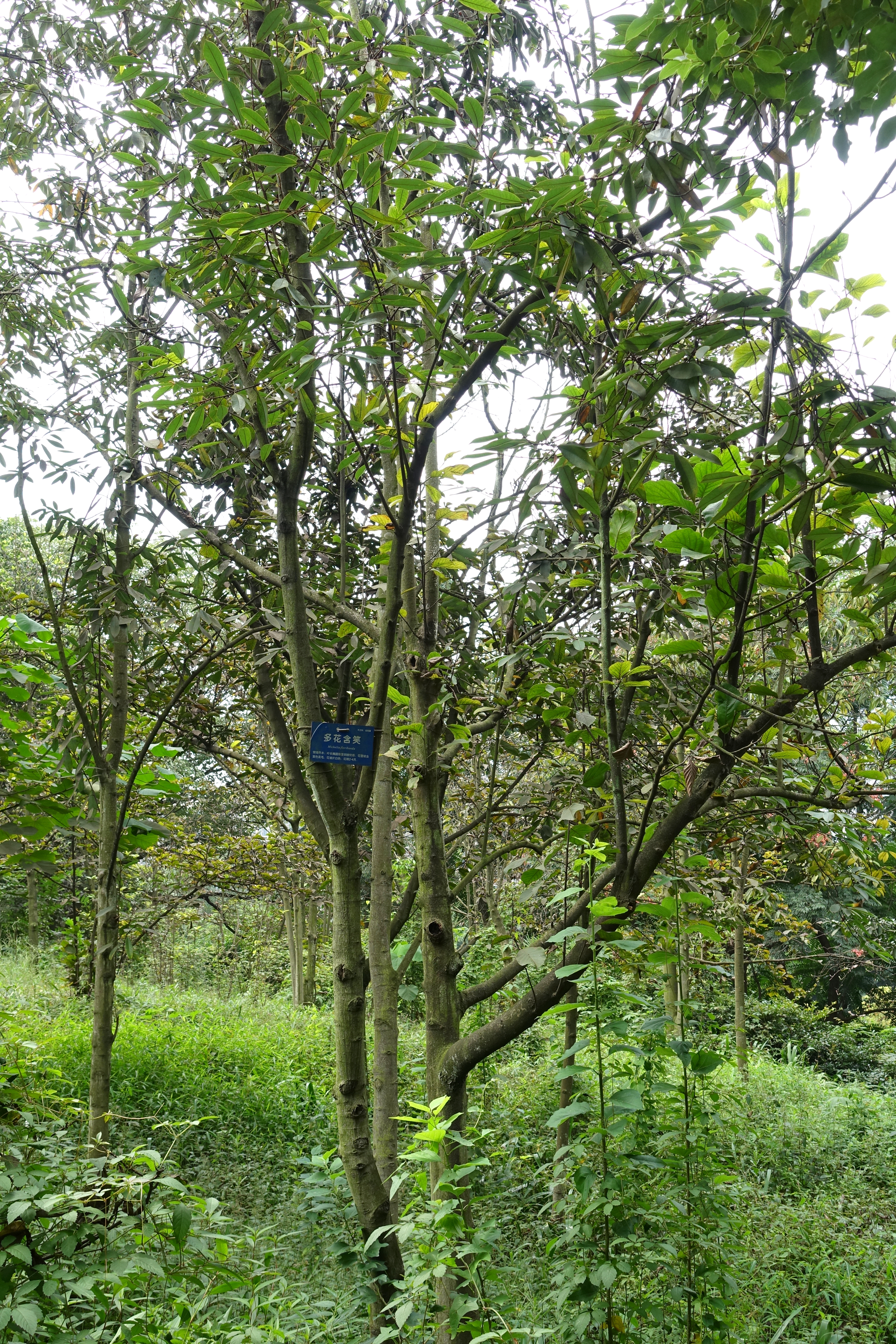
- At the Chengdu Botanical Garden

Conservation status
- Data Deficient (IUCN 3.1)

Scientific classification
- Kingdom: Plantae
- Clade: Embryophytes
- Clade: Tracheophytes
- Clade: Spermatophytes
- Clade: Angiosperms
- Clade: Magnoliids
- Order: Magnoliales
- Family: Magnoliaceae
- Genus: Magnolia
- Species: M. floribunda

Binomial name
- Magnolia floribunda (Finet & Gagnep.) Figlar

Synonyms
- Magnolia microtricha (Hand.-Mazz.) Figlar; Michelia floribunda Finet & Gagnep.; Michelia floribunda var. tongkingensis Dandy; Michelia kerrii Craib; Michelia microtricha Hand.-Mazz.

= Magnolia floribunda =

Species of plant

Magnolia floribunda (syn. Michelia floribunda) is a species of flowering plant in the family Magnoliaceae, native to southern China, Myanmar, Thailand, Laos, and Vietnam. A tree reaching 20 m (66 ft) tall, it is found in forests at elevations from 1,300 to 2,700 m (4,300 to 8,900 ft). It is used as a street tree in a number of Chinese and Australian cities.
