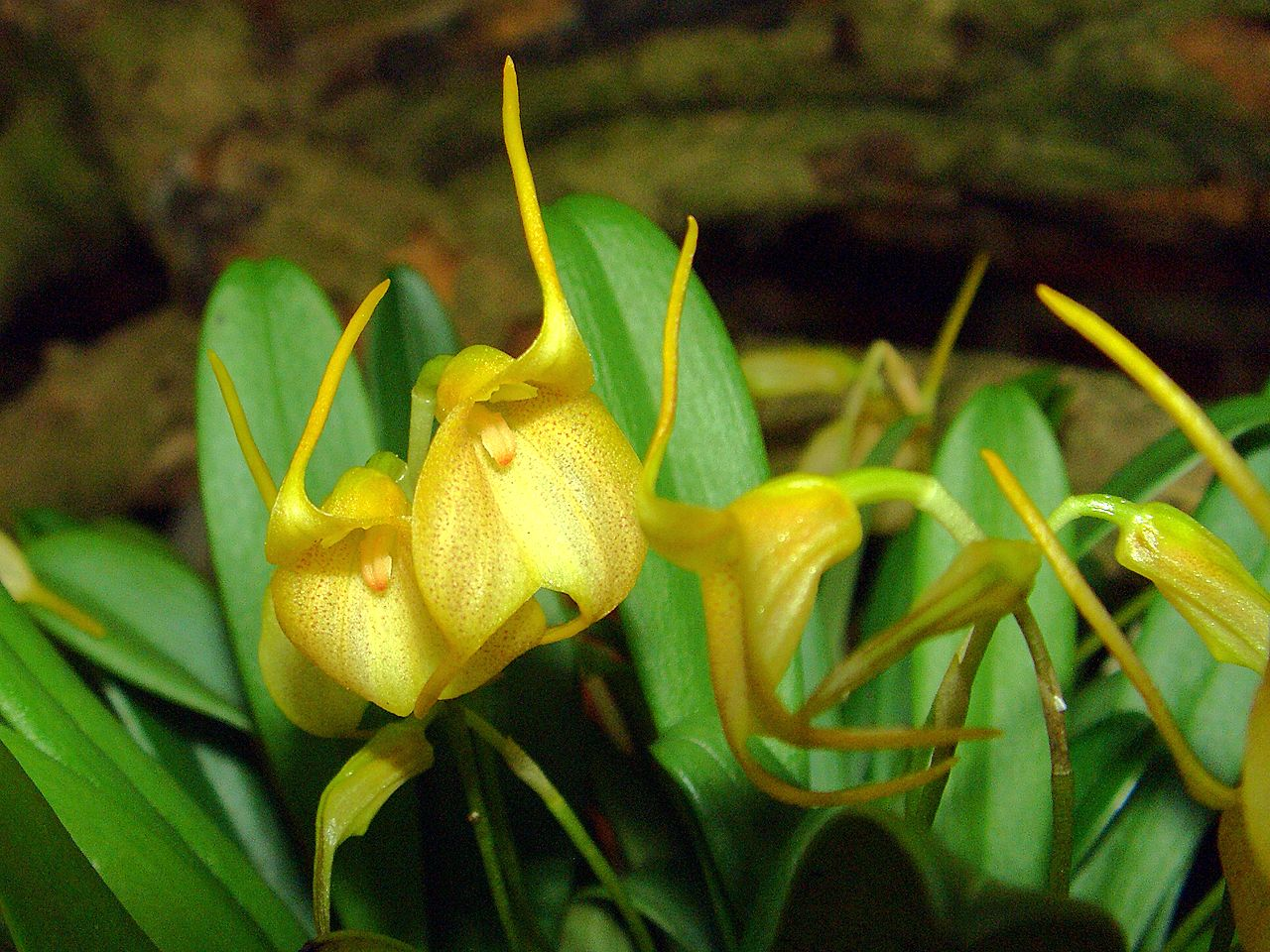

Scientific classification
- Kingdom: Plantae
- Clade: Tracheophytes
- Clade: Angiosperms
- Clade: Monocots
- Order: Asparagales
- Family: Orchidaceae
- Subfamily: Epidendroideae
- Genus: Masdevallia
- Subgenus: Masdevallia subg. Masdevallia
- Section: Masdevallia sect. Minutae
- Species: M. floribunda

Binomial name
- Masdevallia floribunda Lindl.

Synonyms
- Masdevallia galeottiana A.Rich. & Galeotti; Masdevallia lindeniana A.Rich. & Galeotti; Masdevallia myriostigma E.Morren

= Masdevallia floribunda =

Species of orchid

Masdevallia floribunda is a species of orchid found from southern Mexico to Honduras.
