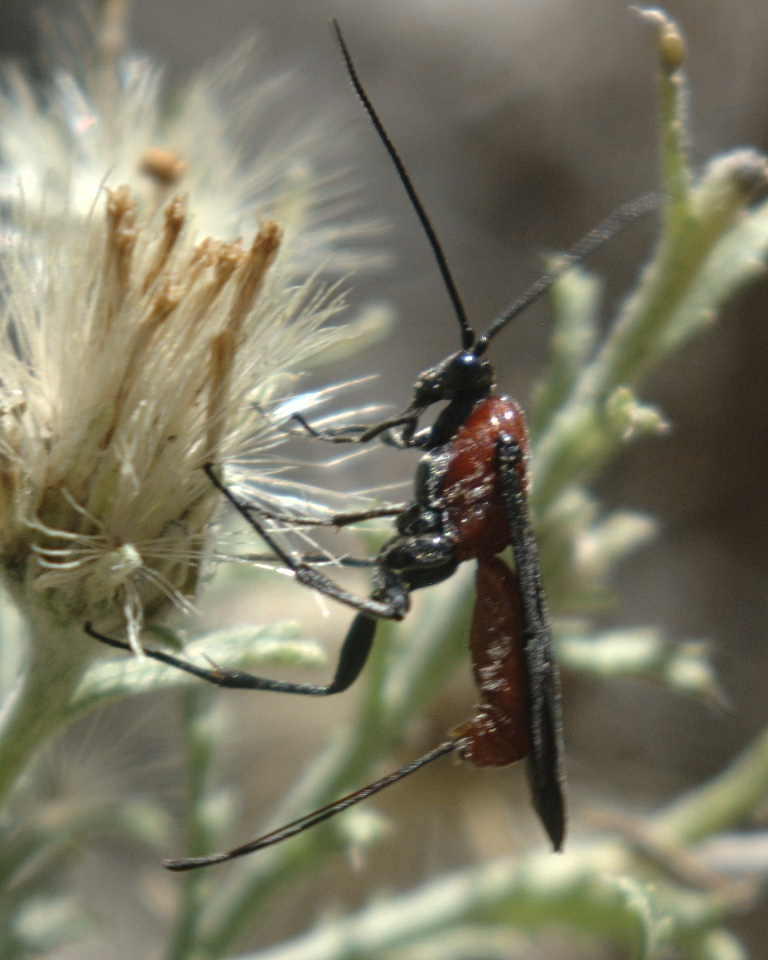
- Female of an unidentified genus with elongate gena.

Scientific classification
- Kingdom: Animalia
- Phylum: Arthropoda
- Class: Insecta
- Order: Hymenoptera
- Family: Braconidae
- Subfamily: Agathidinae

Tribes
- Agathidini; Agathirsini; Cremnoptini; Disophrini; Earinini; Lytopylini; Mesocoelini

= Agathidinae =

Subfamily of wasps

Agathidinae is a subfamily of braconid parasitoid wasps. Some species have been used in biological control programs.

== Description ==
Agathidines are among the larger braconids, and diurnal members of this subfamily are often brightly patterned. They belong to the noncyclostome group. Several genera, such as Agathis, Cremnops and Disophrys, are characterized by elongate genae.

Agithidines can be recognized by the following combinations of features: forewing veins M + CU not tubular in basal third or more, forewing vein RS complete to the wing margin (except Mesocoelus and Plesiocoelus), occipital carina absent, and second submarginal cell of forewing usually present (90% of species.)

== Distribution ==
They are found worldwide, but are more diverse in the tropics. However, some genera such as Agathis and Earinus are more speciose in temperate regions.

== Biology ==
Most Agathidines are solitary koinobiont endoparasitoids of concealed Lepidoptera larvae. However, the tribe Disophrini attacks free living Lepidoptera larvae. The tribes Agathidini and Earinini attack the first and second instar larvae of their hosts, contrasting with the Disophrini, which attack later instars, as well as the Cremnoptini, which parasitize every larval stage. Most species are diurnal, but many Disophrini are nocturnal, with pale coloration and enlarged ocelli. Most species attack semi-concealed hosts, like leaf-rollers.

Agathidines have three larval instars. They likely seek out and kill competitors as first instars. As final instars, they emerge from their host caterpillar, feed externally, then spin their cocoons. Temperate species overwinter in their hosts during their first instar.

Some species, such as Earinus elator, seek out hosts very early in the year, "about the time of bud-burst of their hosts' host plants." In relation to this, they have evolved to complete their metamorphosis before winter so they can more easily seek out hosts early. To prevent their freezing from their nitrogen-filled Meconium onward, they secrete a goo rich in glycerol and fatty acids over the waste. This reduces the freezing point of the water in the waste, preventing ice formation.

Most tropical species are brightly colored and are involved in mimicry.

Studies of the species Alabagrus texanus have found that males that arrive early to a site where females recently emerged from were often successful, but the very young and very old males were always unsuccessful. Males also had short-term memory regarding sites of female emergence.

Agathidines have been noted to be more abundant in ecosystems where fluids are harder to obtain. Many have concealed nectar extraction adaptations (CNEAs) that make them more adapted to gaining nectar from flowers, "perhaps particularly from Asteraceae." These CNEAs include elongate malar regions, galea, glossa, and maxillary palps that form a tube. These elongate mouthparts have independently evolved in the subfamily six times.

Agathis clavatus has been found to practice the mating system of males searching for females at feeding sites (SFF). This strategy is hardly found in Ichneumonoidea.

== Taxonomy and phylogeny ==
The first attempt at a tribal arrangement for Agathidinae consisted of 2 tribes, Agathidini and Microdini. Sharkey revised the tribes in 1992 and considered 5 tribes, adding Cremnoptini, Disophrini, and Earini. The Microdini, then treated as Eumicrodini, was synonymized under Agathidini by Simbolotti and van Achterberg in 1999 to render 4 tribes. Phylogenetic analysis by Sharkey and Chapman in 2017 revealed that 4 tribes were insufficient and instead divided the subfamily into 7 tribes. They further found that the genera Asperagathis, Bassus, and Zosteragathis were not monophyletic. One problematic species, the Nearctic Bassus annulipes, was found to represent a complex of species. Further, Bassus annulipes was rendered under the tribe Lytopylini while the Old World species fell under Agathidini.

== Relationship with humans ==
Agathidines have been used for biological pest control. Notable examples include Agathis pumila for the western larch case-bearer, Alabagrus stigma for the sugarcane borer, and Bassus unicoloratus and Agathis gibbosa for the potato tuberworm. Other species play important roles in their native ecosystems to suppress forestry pests, such as Bassus tumidulus which controls the population of Gypsonoma aceriana.

== Genera ==
The 63 genera placed here include:

=== Tribe Agathidini Haliday, 1833 ===
- Aerophilus Szépligeti, 1902
- Agathacrista Sharkey, 2013
- Agathigma Sharkey, 2017
- Agathis Latreille, 1804
- Alabagrus Enderlein, 1920
- Aphelagathis Sharkey, 2015
- Asperagathis Sharkey, 2017
- Bassus Fabricius, 1804 (polyphyletic)
- Braunsia Kriechbaumer, 1894
- Camptothlipsis Enderlein, 1920
- Chimaeragathis Sharkey, 2017
- Cymagathis Sharkey, 2017
- Gyragathis van Achterberg & Long, 2010
- Ischnagathis Cameron, 1909
- Leuroagathis Sharkey, 2017
- Liragathis Sharkey, 2017
- Neothlipsis Sharkey, Parys & Clutts, 2011
- Pharpa Sharkey, 1986
- Plesiocoelus van Achterberg, 1990
- Pneumagathis Sharkey, 2015
- Scabagathis Sharkey, 2017
- Trachagathis Viereck, 1913
- Trochantagathis Sharkey, 2017
- Xanthagathis Sharkey, 2017
- Zamicrodus Viereck, 1912
- Zosteragathis Sharkey, 2017

=== Tribe Agathirsini Sharkey, 2017 ===
- Agathirsia Westwood, 1882
- Crassomicrodus Ashmead, 1900
- Gelastagathis Sharkey, 2015
- Marjoriella Sharkey, 1983

=== Tribe Cremnoptini Sharkey, 1992 ===
- Cremnops Foerster, 1862
- Cremnoptoides van Achterberg & Chen, 2004
- Hyrtanommatium Enderlein, 1920
- Labagathis Enderlein, 1920
- Megalagathis Schulz, 1906
- Mesoagathis Cameron, 1905
- Zacremnops Sharkey & Wharton, 1985

=== Tribe Disophrini Sharkey, 1992 ===
- Coccygidium Saussure, 1892
- Coronagathis van Achterberg & Long, 2010
- Disophrys Förster, 1863
- Euagathis Szépligeti, 1900
- Gyrochus Enderlein, 1920
- Hemichoma Enderlein, 1920
- Hypsostypos Baltazar, 1963
- Liopisa Enderlein, 1920
- Macroagathis Szépligeti, 1908
- Monophrys van Achterberg, 1988
- Oreba Cameron, 1900
- Pelmagathis Enderlein, 1920
- Protroticus van Achterberg, 1988
- Troticus Brullé, 1846
- Zelodia van Achterberg, 2010
- Zelomorpha Ashmead, 1900

=== Tribe Earinini Sharkey, 1992 ===
- Chilearinus Sharkey, 2022
- Earinus Wesmael, 1837

=== Tribe Lytopylini Sharkey, 2017 ===
- Amputoearinus Sharkey, 2006
- Austroearinus Sharkey, 2006
- Lytopylus Förster, 1862
- Sesioctonus Viereck, 1912
- Smithagathis Sharkey, 2017

=== Tribe Mesocoelini Achterberg, 1990 ===
- Aneurobracon Brues, 1930 (formerly in Orgilinae)
- Mesocoelus Schulz, 1911 (formerly in Orgilinae)
- Therophilus Wesmael, 1837
- Undescribed genus (former Bassus annulipes group)

== Gallery ==
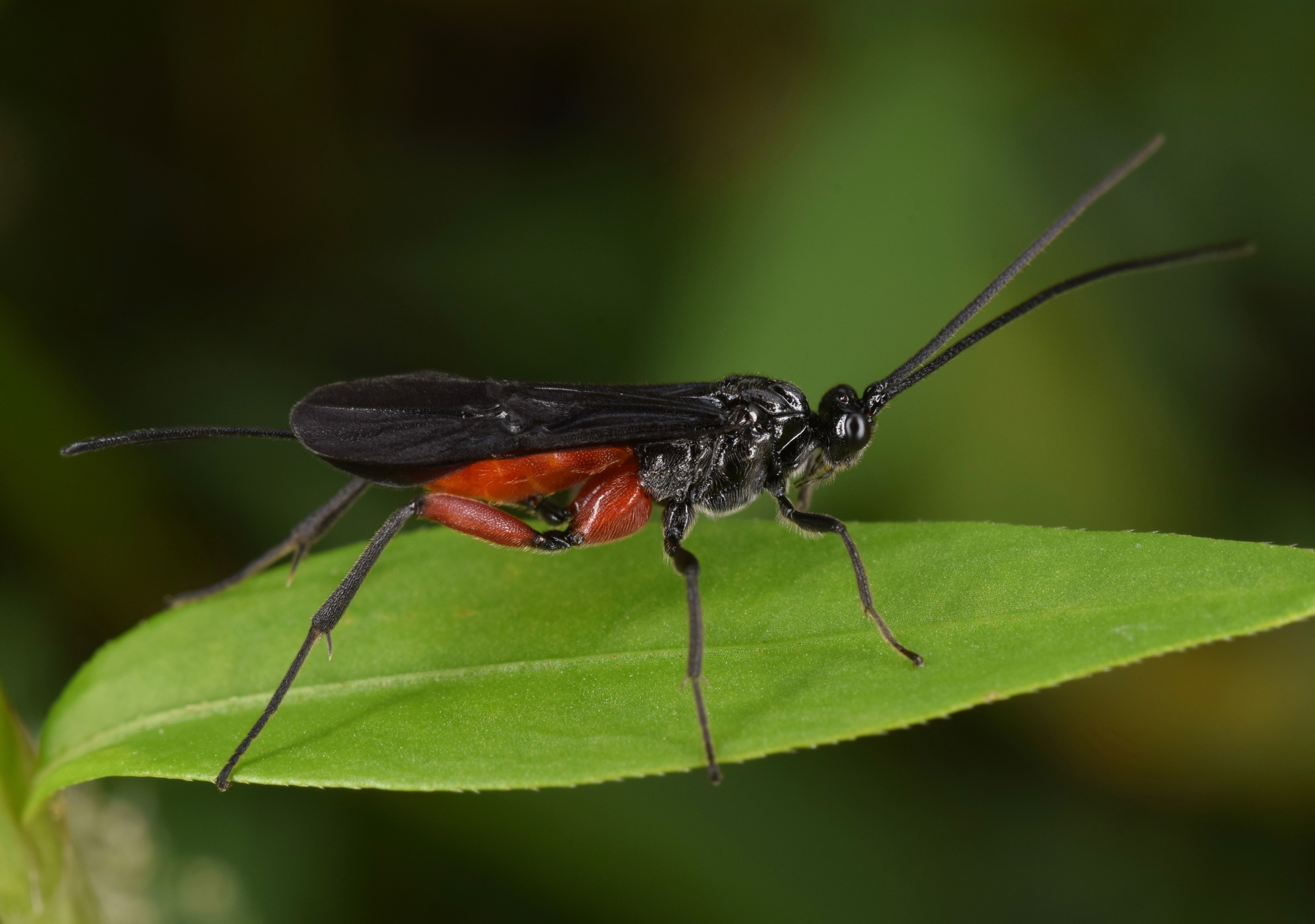
Agathidini - Alabagrus texanus

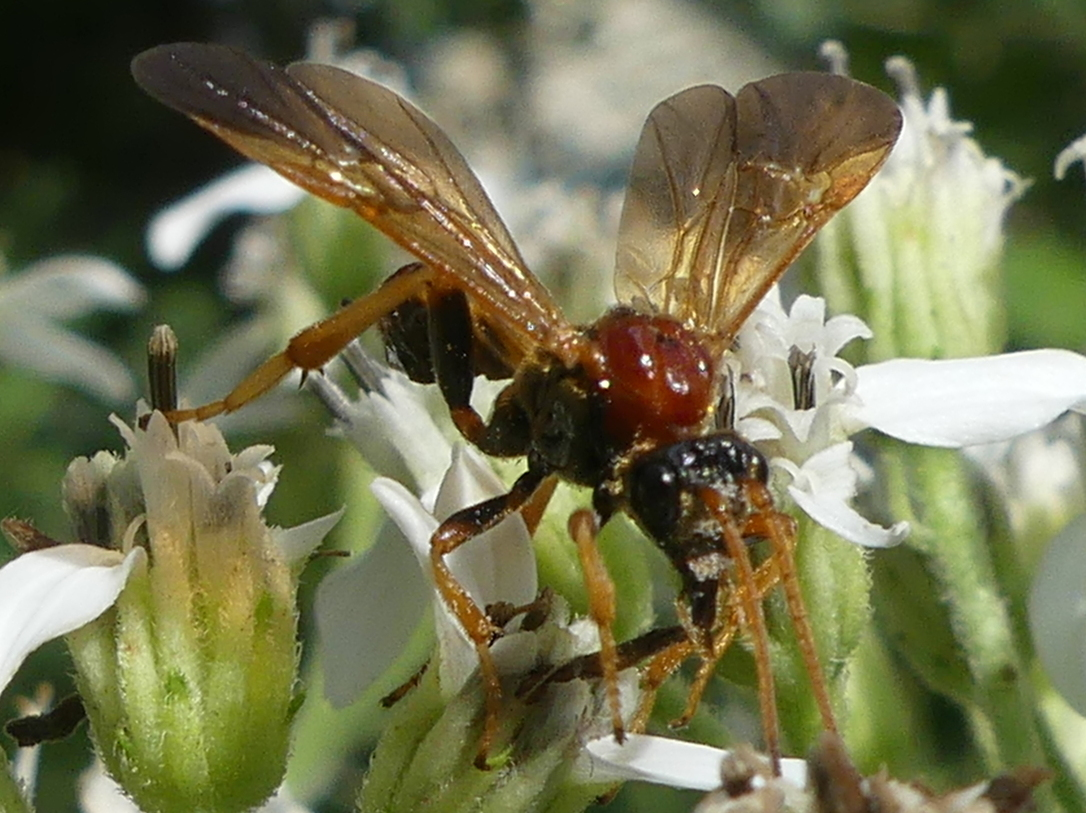
Agathirsini - Agathirsia sp.

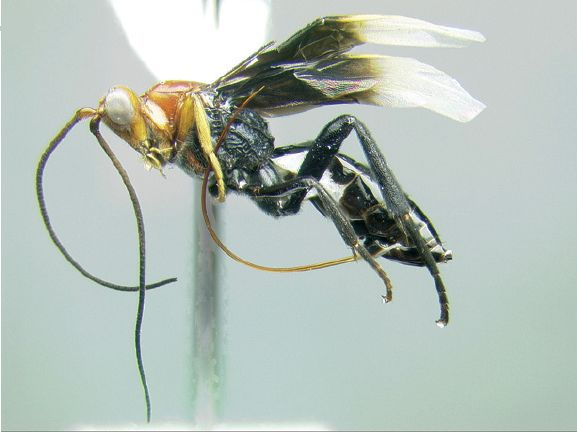
Cremnoptini - Megalagathis sp.

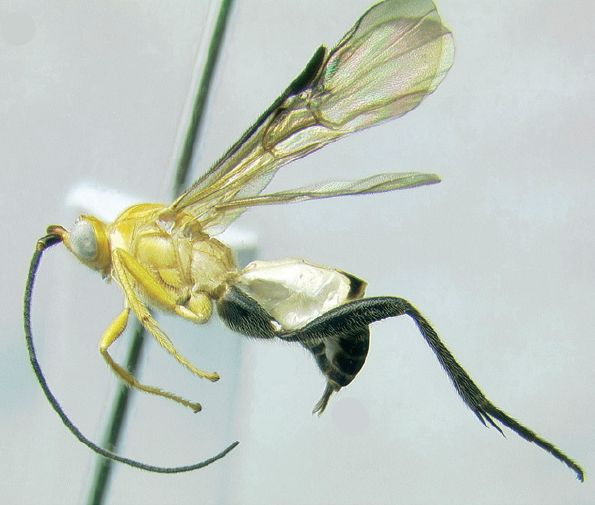
Disophrini - Coccygidium sp.

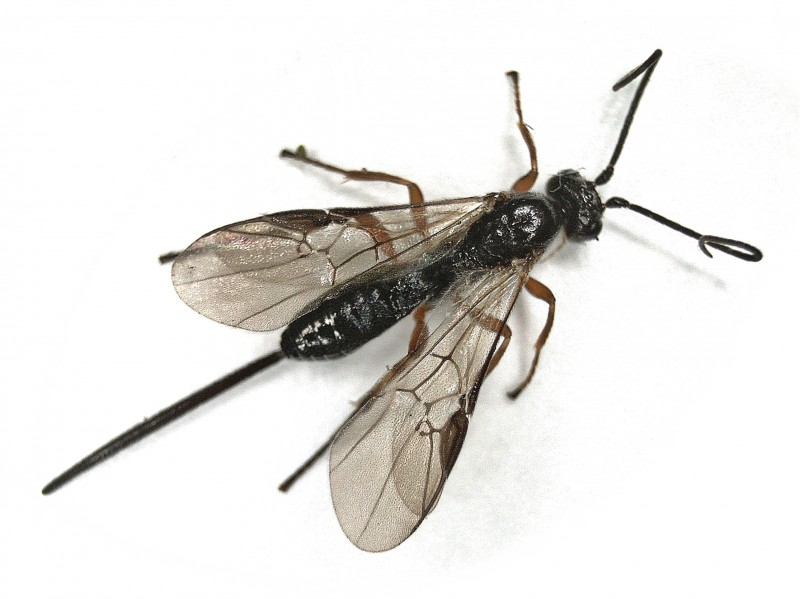
Earini - Earinus elator

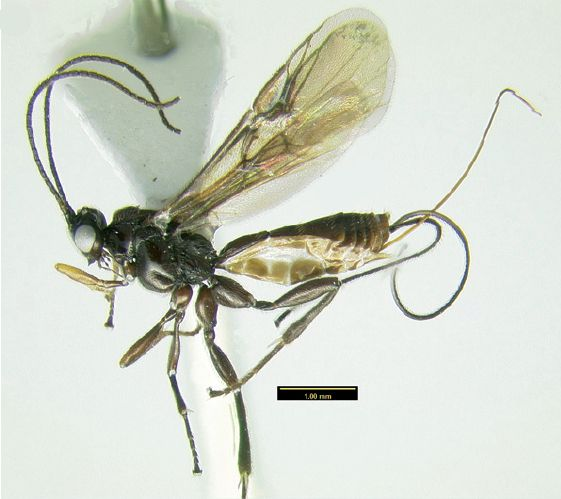
Lytopylini - Lytopylus sp.

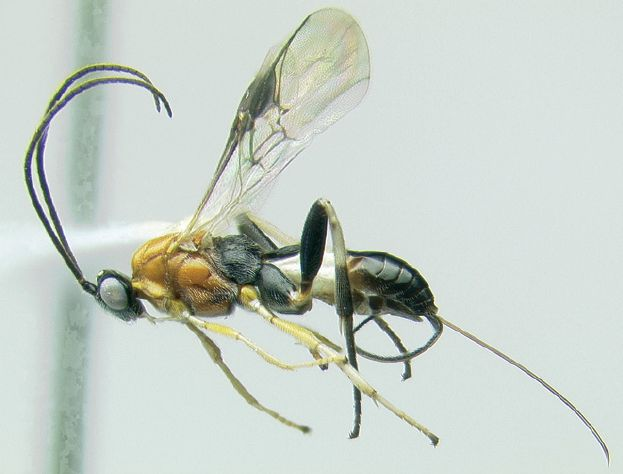
Mesocoelini - Therophilus sp.
