= Braunsia =

Braunsia may refer to:

- Braunsia (plant), a plant genus in the family Aizoaceae
- Braunsia (wasp), an insect genus in the family Braconidae
