= Aporomicrodus =

Aporomicrodus Temporal range: Triassic

Scientific classification
- Kingdom: Animalia
- Phylum: Chordata
- Class: ?Reptilia
- Genus: †Aporomicrodus Fowler, 1958

Type species
- †Aporomicrodus laevis (Emmons, 1857)

Synonyms
- Genus synonymy: Microdus Emmons, 1857 (preoccupied by Microdus Nees, 1814); Species synonymy: Microdus laevis Emmons, 1857

Extinct genus of reptiles

Aporomicrodus is an extinct genus of possible reptiles that lived during the Triassic. It contains one species, A. laevis, which has been found in North Carolina.

== Taxonomy and classification ==
Microdus laevis was named by Ebenezer Emmons in 1857 for a tooth from Triassic sediments in North Carolina. The original genus name was preoccupied by the wasp Microdus. In 1958, Henry W. Fowler proposed Aporomicrodus as a replacement.

Emmons initially identified A. laevis as a shark and assigned it to the family Squalidae. Fowler also thought it was a shark, though he referred it to Galeorhinidae instead. However, Henri Cappetta reidentified it as a potential reptile based on the tooth morphology.
