= Agathis (disambiguation) =

Agathis is a genus of evergreen trees.

Agathis may also refer to:

- Agathis (wasp), a genus of braconid wasps
- Agathis, a character in the 1776 opera Les mariages samnites
