= Euproctis fraterna =

Scientific classification
- Domain: Eukaryota
- Kingdom: Animalia
- Phylum: Arthropoda
- Class: Insecta
- Order: Lepidoptera
- Superfamily: Noctuoidea
- Family: Erebidae
- Genus: Euproctis
- Species: E. fraterna

Binomial name
- Euproctis fraterna Moore, 1883

Species of moth

Euproctis fraterna is a moth of the family Erebidae first described by Frederic Moore in 1883. It is found in the Maldives, India, Sri Lanka and the Seychelles.

== Description ==
The adult is yellowish with pale transverse lines and black spots on the forewing. Larvae are hairy and reddish brown. Head reddish with white hairs.

The caterpillar is major pest on several agricultural crops such as Ziziphus mauritiana, Ziziphus xylopyra, Ziziphus jujuba, Terminalia catappa, Ricinus communis, Pyrus communis, Quisqualis indica, Sesamum indicum, Shorea robusta, Solanum melongena, Tectona grandis, Rosa, Rubus, Toxicodendron succedaneum, Trewia nudiflora, Tylophora asthmatica, Vigna unguiculata, Punica granatum, Codiaeum, Coffea, Dalbergia sissoo, Desmodium oojeinense, Gossypium, Grewia asiatica, Helianthus annuus, Hibiscus rosa-sinensis, Limonia elephantum, Malus pumila, Mangifera indica, Manihot esculenta, Manilkara zapota, Musa, Pelargonium, Persea bombycina, Plantago, Prunus persica, Psidium, Punica granatum, Abelmoschus esculentus, Aleurites fordii, Aleurites montana, Artocarpus heterophyllus, Bauhinia variegate, Bombax, Cajanus cajan, Camellia sinensis, Cinnamomum and Citrus.

The first sign of the attack is defoliation. Caterpillars can be controlled by the spraying of neem oil or chlorpyrifos and quinolphos. Caterpillars can also be controlled by mechanical methods or biological predators such as the parasitoids Helicospilus merdarius, Helicospilus horsefieldi, Apanteles species, Disophrys species.
