= List of Alabagrus species =

This is a list of 109 species in Alabagrus, a genus of wasp in the family Braconidae.

== Alabagrus species ==
- Alabagrus albispina (Cameron, 1887)^{c g}
- Alabagrus alixa Sharkey, 1988^{c g}
- Alabagrus arawak Sharkey, 1988^{c g}
- Alabagrus arua Sharkey, 1988^{c g}
- Alabagrus aymara Sharkey, 1988^{c g}
- Alabagrus botocudo Sharkey, 1988^{c g}
- Alabagrus caingang Sharkey, 1988^{c g}
- Alabagrus calibi Sharkey, 1988^{c g}
- Alabagrus caquetio Sharkey, 1988^{c g}
- Alabagrus cara Sharkey, 1988^{c g}
- Alabagrus carib Sharkey, 1988^{c g}
- Alabagrus caudatus (Szepligeti, 1904)^{c}
- Alabagrus chimu Sharkey, 1988^{c g}
- Alabagrus coatlicue Sharkey, 1988^{c g}
- Alabagrus cocto Sharkey, 1988^{c g}
- Alabagrus combos Leathers & Sharkey, 2003^{c g}
- Alabagrus cora Sharkey, 1988^{c g}
- Alabagrus cuna Sharkey, 1988^{c g}
- Alabagrus derailersi Leathers & Sharkey, 2003^{c g}
- Alabagrus diegeli Sharkey, 1988^{c g}
- Alabagrus donnai Leathers & Sharkey, 2003^{c g}
- Alabagrus ekchuah Sharkey, 1988^{c g}
- Alabagrus elatoscutum Sharkey, 1988^{c g}
- Alabagrus englishi Leathers & Sharkey, 2003^{c g}
- Alabagrus erythromelas (Brulle, 1846)^{c}
- Alabagrus esenbeckii (Spinola, 1840)^{c}
- Alabagrus festivus (Enderlein, 1920)^{c g}
- Alabagrus fuscistigma Enderlein, 1920^{c g}
- Alabagrus guayaki Sharkey, 1988^{c g}
- Alabagrus haenschi (Enderlein, 1920)^{c g}
- Alabagrus imitatus (Cresson, 1873)^{c g}
- Alabagrus intimapa Sharkey, 1988^{c g}
- Alabagrus ixtilton Sharkey, 1988^{c g}
- Alabagrus janzeni Sharkey, 1988^{c g}
- Alabagrus jatunqepi Sharkey, 1988^{c g}
- Alabagrus juchuy Sharkey, 1988^{c g}
- Alabagrus kagaba Sharkey, 1988^{c g}
- Alabagrus kiska Sharkey, 1988^{c g}
- Alabagrus laevis (Enderlein, 1920)^{c g}
- Alabagrus latisoma Sharkey, 1988^{c g}
- Alabagrus latreillei (Spinola, 1840)^{c g}
- Alabagrus leptosoma Sharkey, 1988^{c g}
- Alabagrus levipodeum Sharkey, 1988^{c g}
- Alabagrus llampu Sharkey, 1988^{c g}
- Alabagrus lokono Sharkey, 1988^{c g}
- Alabagrus maculipes (Cameron, 1887)^{c g}
- Alabagrus marginatifrons (Muesebeck, 1927)^{c g}
- Alabagrus masneri Sharkey, 1988^{c g}
- Alabagrus masoni Sharkey, 1988^{c g}
- Alabagrus mataco Sharkey, 1988^{c g}
- Alabagrus maue Sharkey, 1988^{c g}
- Alabagrus maya Sharkey, 1988^{c g}
- Alabagrus miqa Sharkey, 1988^{c g}
- Alabagrus misa Sharkey, 1988^{c g}
- Alabagrus mixcoatl Sharkey, 1988^{c g}
- Alabagrus mocovi Sharkey, 1988^{c g}
- Alabagrus mojos Sharkey, 1988^{c g}
- Alabagrus muisca Sharkey, 1988^{c g}
- Alabagrus nahuatl Sharkey, 1988^{c g}
- Alabagrus nicoya Sharkey, 1988^{c g}
- Alabagrus nigritulus (Szepligeti, 1902)^{c g}
- Alabagrus nio Sharkey, 1988^{c g}
- Alabagrus olmec Sharkey, 1988^{c g}
- Alabagrus oyana Sharkey, 1988^{c g}
- Alabagrus pachamama Sharkey, 1988^{c g}
- Alabagrus paqo Sharkey, 1988^{c g}
- Alabagrus parunaupi Sharkey, 1988^{c g}
- Alabagrus parusimi Sharkey, 1988^{c g}
- Alabagrus paruyana Sharkey, 1988^{c g}
- Alabagrus parvifaciatus (Cameron, 1911)^{c g}
- Alabagrus pecki Sharkey, 1988^{c g}
- Alabagrus pisipuka Sharkey, 1988^{c g}
- Alabagrus plaumanni Sharkey, 1988^{c g}
- Alabagrus porteri Sharkey, 1988^{c g}
- Alabagrus puri Sharkey, 1988^{c g}
- Alabagrus roibasi Sharkey, 1988^{c g}
- Alabagrus sanctus (Say, 1836)^{c g}
- Alabagrus sarapiqui Leathers & Sharkey, 2003^{c g}
- Alabagrus semialbus (Szepligeti, 1902)^{c g}
- Alabagrus shorteri Sharkey, 1988^{c g}
- Alabagrus sispacara Sharkey, 1988^{c g}
- Alabagrus sispalatreillei Sharkey, 1988^{c g}
- Alabagrus solox (Enderlein, 1920)^{c g}
- Alabagrus stigma (Brulle, 1846)^{c b}
- Alabagrus suni Sharkey, 1988^{c g}
- Alabagrus testaceus (Szepligeti, 1902)^{c g}
- Alabagrus texanus (Cresson, 1872)^{c g b}
- Alabagrus triangulifer (Enderlein, 1920)^{c g}
- Alabagrus tricarinatus (Cameron, 1905)^{c g}
- Alabagrus tripartitus (Brulle, 1846)^{c g}
- Alabagrus tupinamba Sharkey, 1988^{c g}
- Alabagrus uchuk Sharkey, 1988^{c g}
- Alabagrus uchukqepi Sharkey, 1988^{c g}
- Alabagrus uru Sharkey, 1988^{c g}
- Alabagrus variegatus (Brulle, 1846)^{c g}
- Alabagrus varipes (Cresson, 1865)^{c g}
- Alabagrus varius (Enderlein, 1920)^{c g}
- Alabagrus versicolor (Brèthes, 1909)^{c g}
- Alabagrus voto Sharkey, 1988^{c g}
- Alabagrus wachapu Sharkey, 1988^{c g}
- Alabagrus waiwai Sharkey, 1988^{c g}
- Alabagrus waorani Sharkey, 1988^{c g}
- Alabagrus warrau Sharkey, 1988^{c g}
- Alabagrus watachupa Sharkey, 1988^{c g}
- Alabagrus watsoni Leathers & Sharkey, 2003^{c g}
- Alabagrus xipe Sharkey, 1988^{c g}
- Alabagrus xoloti Sharkey, 1988^{c g}
- Alabagrus yanamapa Sharkey, 1988^{c g}
- Alabagrus yaruro Sharkey, 1988^{c g}

Data sources: i = ITIS, c = Catalogue of Life, g = GBIF, b = Bugguide.net
