= Homonym (biology) =

Scientific name that is identical in spelling to a name with a different type

In biology, a homonym is a name for a taxon that is identical in spelling (or effectively identical; see below) to another such name, that belongs to a different taxon.

The Principle of homonymy in the International Code of Zoological Nomenclature, coordinate with the principle of priority, is that the first such name to be published is the senior homonym and is to be used (it is "valid"); any others are junior homonyms and must be replaced with new names.

For example:
- Cuvier proposed the genus Echidna in 1797 for the spiny anteater.
- However, Forster had already published the name Echidna in 1777 for a genus of moray eels.
- Forster's use thus has priority, with Cuvier's being a junior homonym.
- Illiger published the replacement name Tachyglossus in 1811.

It is, however, possible that if a senior homonym is archaic, and not in "prevailing usage," it may be declared a nomen oblitum and rendered permanently invalid, while the junior homonym is valid as a nomen protectum.

For example:
- Agassiz proposed the name Bucardium in 1848 as an emendation of the genus name Buccardium Megerle, 1811 (now considered a synonym of Glossus).
- Later, Gray used the name Bucardium in 1853 for a genus of cockles.
- Even though Agassiz' name has priority, it was not used as a valid name after 1899, while Gray's name was widely accepted (and is still in use).
- Under ICZN Article 23.9, the junior homonym is protected from being replaced, and the senior homonym is considered permanently invalid.

Similarly, the International Code of Nomenclature for algae, fungi, and plants (ICN) specifies that the first published of two or more homonyms is to be used: a later homonym is "illegitimate" and is not to be used unless conserved (or sanctioned, in the case of fungi).

Example: the later homonym Myroxylon L.f. (1782), in the family Leguminosae, is conserved against the earlier homonym Myroxylon J.R.Forst. & G.Forst. (1775) (now called Xylosma, in the family Salicaceae).

== Limits and exceptions ==
Under the zoological code, homonymy can only occur within each of the three nomenclatural ranks (family-rank, genus-rank, and species-rank) but not between them; there are thousands of cases where a species epithet is identical to a genus name but not a homonym (sometimes even occurring in the genus it is identical to, such as Gorilla gorilla, termed a "tautonym"), and there are some rare cases where a family-rank name and a genus-rank name are identical (e.g., the superfamily name Ranoidea and the genus name Ranoidea are not homonyms). Unavailable names do not compete for homonymy. The botanical code is generally similar, but prohibits tautonyms.

=== Parahomonyms ===
Under the botanical code, names that are similar enough that they are likely to be confused are also considered to be homonymous (article 53.3). For example, Astrostemma Benth. (1880) is an illegitimate homonym of Asterostemma Decne. (1838). The zoological code considers even a single letter difference to be sufficient to render family-rank and genus-rank names distinct (Article 56.2), though for species names, the ICZN specifies a number of spelling variations (Article 58) that are considered to be identical, such as names that have grammatically acceptable alternative spellings or terminations (e.g., caeruleus and coeruleus are homonyms, as are smithi and smithii).

=== Hemihomonyms ===
Both codes only consider taxa that are in their respective scope (animals for the ICZN; primarily plants for the ICN). Therefore, if an animal taxon has the same name as a plant taxon, both names are valid. Such names are called hemihomonyms.

For example, the name Erica has been given to both a genus of spiders, Erica Peckham & Peckham, 1892, and to a genus of heaths, Erica L.

Another example is Cyanea, applied to the lion's mane jellyfish Cyanea Péron and Lesueur and to the Hawaiian lobelioid Cyanea Gaudich.

An example involving a fungus rather than a plant is Strobilurus, which is given to both a genus of saprobic fungi Strobilurus Singer, 1962 and a monotypic genus of lizard Strobilurus Wiegmann, 1834.

Hemihomonyms are possible at the species level as well, with organisms in different kingdoms sharing the same binomial nomenclature. For instance, Orestias elegans denotes both a species of fish (kingdom Animalia) and a species of orchid (kingdom Plantae). Such duplication of binomials occurs in at least nine instances.

Animal	Plant
Adesmia muricata (Linnaeus, 1758) (a beetle)	Adesmia muricata (Jacq.) DC. (a legume)
Agathis montana Shestakov, 1932 (a wasp)	Agathis montana de Laub. (the Mount Panié kauri, a conifer)
Baileya australis (Grote, 1881) (the small baileya moth)	Baileya australis Rydb. syn. B. multiradiata (a desert marigold)
Centropogon australis (White, 1790) (the fortescue, a waspfish)	Centropogon australis Gleason (a bellflower)
Cuspidaria cuspidata (Olivi, 1792) (a bivalve)	Cuspidaria cuspidata (M. Bieb.) Takht. syn. Erysimum cuspidatum (a wallflower)
Ficus variegata Röding, 1798 (the true fig shell, a sea snail)	Ficus variegata Blume (the common red-stem fig)
Gaussia princeps (T. Scott, 1894) (a copepod)	Gaussia princeps H.Wendl. (a palm)
Orestias elegans Garman, 1895 (a pupfish)	Orestias elegans Ridl. (an orchid)
Tritonia pallida Stimpson, 1855 (a nudibranch)	Tritonia pallida Ker Gawl. (an iris)

== See also ==
- Glossary of scientific naming
- Isonym – Term in botanical nomenclature. Isonyms have no nomenclatural status (they are not validly published).
- Priority (biology) – Principle of biological nomenclature
