= Strobilurus =

Strobilurus may refer to either of two different genera of organisms:

- Strobilurus (fungus), a genus of fungus
- Strobilurus (lizard), a genus of lizard containing the single species S. torquatus
