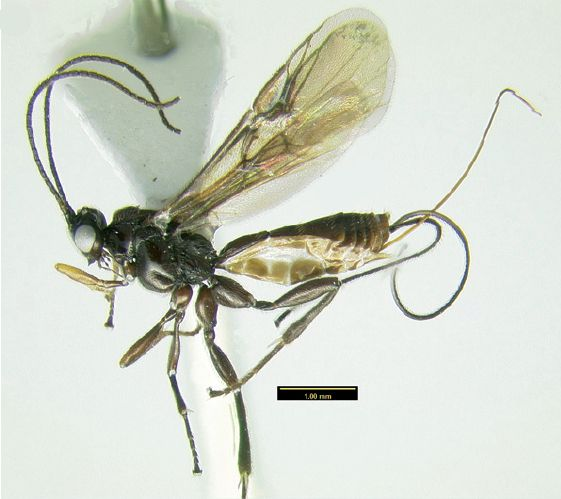
- Lytopylus sp.

Scientific classification
- Kingdom: Animalia
- Phylum: Arthropoda
- Class: Insecta
- Order: Hymenoptera
- Family: Braconidae
- Subfamily: Agathidinae
- Tribe: Lytopylini
- Genus: Lytopylus; Föster, 1862

= Lytopylus =

Genus of wasps

Lytopylus is a genus of parasitoid wasps in the family Braconidae. As members of the subfamily Agathidinae, they are koinobiont endoparasitoids of caterpillars. This genus is primarily found in the neotropics, but ranges from the northeastern United States to Argentina. It is also found in the Middle East and Asia. There are 39 species of Lytopylus, and many more undescribed.

== Species ==
- Lytopylus alejandromasisi
- Lytopylus alfredomainieri
- Lytopylus anamariamongeae
- Lytopylus angelgonzalezae
- Lytopylus bradzlotnicki
- Lytopylus brevitarsis
- Lytopylus cesarmorai
- Lytopylus chrysokeras
- Lytopylus colleenhitchcockae
- Lytopylus eddysanchezi
- Lytopylus eliethcantillanoae
- Lytopylus ericchapmani
- Lytopylus flavicalcar
- Lytopylus gahyunae
- Lytopylus gisukae
- Lytopylus gregburtoni
- Lytopylus guillermopereirai
- Lytopylus gustavoindunii
- Lytopylus hartmanguidoi
- Lytopylus hernanbravoi
- Lytopylus hokwoni
- Lytopylus ivanniasandovalae
- Lytopylus jessicadimauroae
- Lytopylus jessiehillae
- Lytopylus johanvalerioi
- Lytopylus josecortesi
- Lytopylus lamelliger
- Lytopylus lucidus
- Lytopylus luisgaritai
- Lytopylus macadamiae
- Lytopylus mariamartachavarriae
- Lytopylus miguelviquezi
- Lytopylus mingfangi
- Lytopylus motohasegawai
- Lytopylus okchunae
- Lytopylus pablocobbi
- Lytopylus rebeccashapleyae
- Lytopylus robertofernandezi
- Lytopylus robpringlei
- Lytopylus rogerblacoi
- Lytopylus romani
- Lytopylus rufipes
- Lytopylus rufus
- Lytopylus sandraberriosae
- Lytopylus sangyeoni
- Lytopylus sarahmeierottoae
- Lytopylus sergiobermudezi
- Lytopylus sigifredomarini
- Lytopylus speciosicornis
- Lytopylus sulcatus
- Lytopylus vaughntani
- Lytopylus youngcheae
