= Therophilus =

Scientific classification
- Kingdom: Animalia
- Phylum: Arthropoda
- Class: Insecta
- Order: Hymenoptera
- Family: Braconidae
- Subfamily: Agathidinae
- Genus: Therophilus; Wesmael, 1837

Genus of wasps

Therophilus is a genus of parasitoid wasp in the family Braconidae.

== Species ==
- Therophilus agilis Cresson, 1873
- Therophilus annuliferus van Achterberg & Long, 2010
- Therophilus anuchati Sharkey, 2012
- Therophilus apichati Sharkey, 2012
- Therophilus arcuatus Reinhard, 1867
- Therophilus areeluckae Sharkey, 2012
- Therophilus bobwhartoni Sharkey, 2017
- Therophilus boonthami Sharkey, 2012
- Therophilus breviscutum van Achterberg, 2011
- Therophilus calcaratus Cresson, 1873
- Therophilus cattienensis van Achterberg & Long, 2010
- Therophilus chiangmaiensis Sharkey, 2012
- Therophilus cingulipes Nees von Esenbeck, 1812
- Therophilus clausthalianus Ratzeburg, 1844
- Therophilus conspicuus Wesmael, 1837
- Therophilus contrastus van Achterberg & Long, 2010
- Therophilus cornutus Granger, 1949
- Therophilus crenulisulcatus van Achterberg & Long, 2010
- Therophilus curvabilis Bhat & Gupta, 1977
- Therophilus cymocles Nixon, 1950
- Therophilus depressiferus van Achterberg & Long, 2010
- Therophilus dimidiator Nees von Esenbeck, 1834
- Therophilus donaldquickei Sharkey, 2017
- Therophilus elongator van Achterberg & Long, 2010
- Therophilus epinotiae van Achterberg, 1992
- Therophilus festivus Muesebeck, 1953
- Therophilus flavus Bhat & Gupta, 1977
- Therophillus gracewoodae Sharkey, 2017
- Therophilus graecus Simbolotti & van Achterberg, 1992
- Therophilus hyalinis Bhat & Gupta, 1977
- Therophilus javanus Bhat & Gupta, 1977
- Therophilus kwanuiae Sharkey, 2012
- Therophilus levisoma van Achterberg & Long, 2010
- Therophilus lienhoachihensis Chou & Sharkey, 1989
- Therophilus linguarius Nees von Esenbeck, 1812
- Therophilus longiscutum van Achterberg, 2011
- Therophilus maetoiSharkey, 2017
- Therophilus marshi Bhat & Gupta, 1977
- Therophilus marucae van Achterberg & Long, 2010
- Therophilus mediator Nees, 1814
- Therophilus mellisoma van Achterberg & Long, 2010
- Therophilus montywoodi Sharkey, 2017
- Therophilus nigrator van Achterberg, 2011
- Therophilus nigrolineatus van Achterberg & Long, 2010
- Therophilus nugax Reinhard, 1867
- Therophilus nuichuaensis van Achterberg & Long, 2010
- Therophilus onodyi Iza-Campos & Penteado-Dias 2021
- Therophilus parasper van Achterberg & Long, 2010
- Therophilus penteadodiasae Sharkey, 2017
- Therophilus perforator Provancher, 1880
- Therophilus planifrons van Achterberg & Long, 2010
- Therophilus pumilus Ratzeburg, 1844
- Therophilus punctiscutum van Achterberg & Long, 2010
- Therophilus robustus van Achterberg & Long, 2010
- Therophilus rugosiferus van Achterberg & Long, 2010
- Therophilus rugulosus Nees von Esenbeck, 1834
- Therophilus scutellatus van Achterberg & Long, 2010
- Therophilus shimborii Iza-Campos & Penteado-Dias 2021
- Therophilus simillimus Cresson, 1873
- Therophilus songrani Sharkey, 2012
- Therophilus sukpengae Sharkey, 2012
- Therophilus sulciferus van Achterberg, 2011
- Therophilus tegularis Thomson, 1895
- Therophilus tumidulus Nees von Esenbeck, 1812
- Therophilus unimaculatus Turner
- Therophilus wannai Sharkey, 2012
- Therophilus wongchaii Sharkey, 2012
- Therophilus wongwani Sharkey, 2012
- Therophilus zaykovi Nixon, 1986
