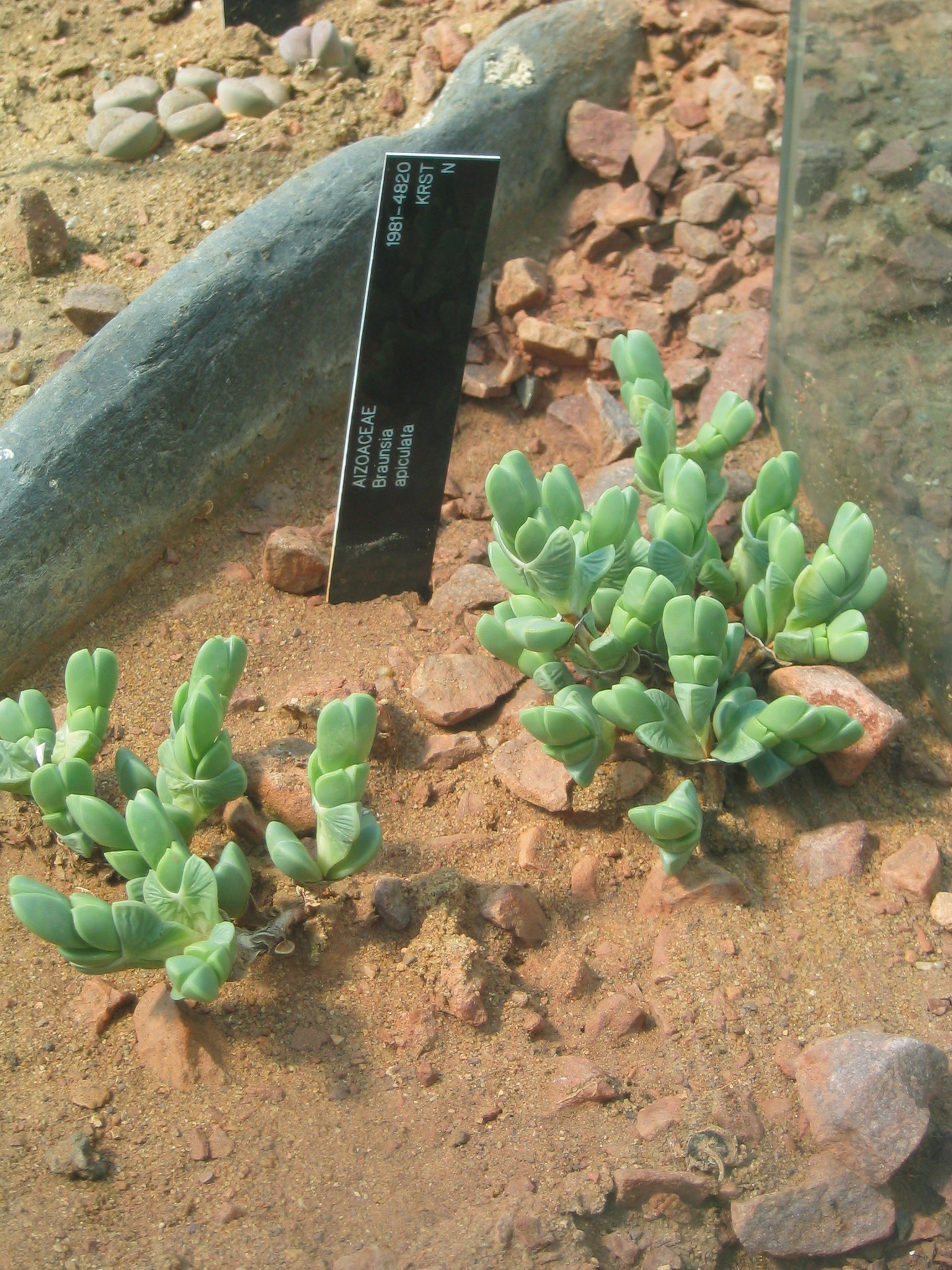

Scientific classification
- Kingdom: Plantae
- Clade: Tracheophytes
- Clade: Angiosperms
- Clade: Eudicots
- Order: Caryophyllales
- Family: Aizoaceae
- Genus: Braunsia
- Species: B. apiculata

Binomial name
- Braunsia apiculata (Kensit) L.Bolus

Synonyms
- Echinus apiculatus (Kensit) L.Bolus; Mesembryanthemum apiculatum Kensit (1909) (basionym)

= Braunsia apiculata =

Species of succulent

Braunsia apiculata is a perennial succulent plant belonging to the ice plant family (Aizoaceae). It is a succulent subshrub native to the Cape Provinces of South Africa. It has been introduced elsewhere.

The magenta flowers open in early spring. It silvery green leaves grow in pairs, stacking one pair of leaves on top of the other.
