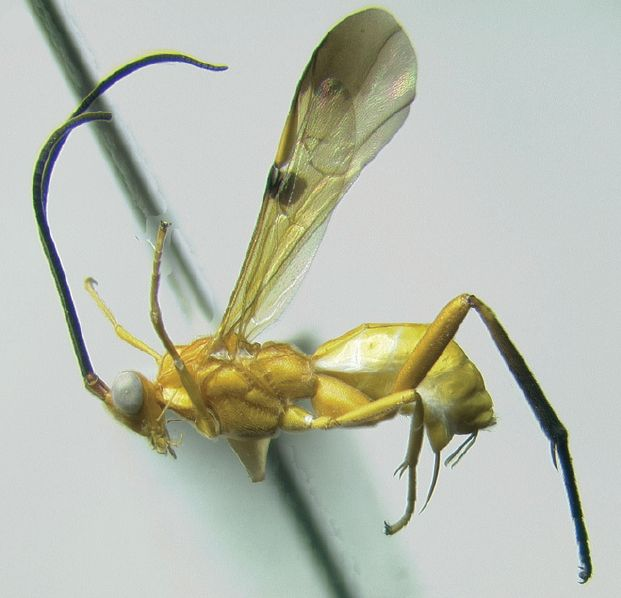
- Euagathis specimen

Scientific classification
- Kingdom: Animalia
- Phylum: Arthropoda
- Class: Insecta
- Order: Hymenoptera
- Family: Braconidae
- Subfamily: Agathidinae
- Tribe: Disophrini
- Genus: Euagathis; Szépligeti, 1900

= Euagathis =

Genus of wasps

Euagathis is a genus of parasitoid wasp in the family Braconidae.

== Species ==
- Euagathis abbotti
- Euagathis albotarsus
- Euagathis alluaudi
- Euagathis annulitarsis
- Euagathis argentosa
- Euagathis atripennis
- Euagathis aurea
- Euagathis bifasciata
- Euagathis bifoveolata
- Euagathis bipartita
- Euagathis borneoensis
- Euagathis breviantennata
- Euagathis brevitibialis
- Euagathis chinensis
- Euagathis chromoptera
- Euagathis clathrata
- Euagathis crenata
- Euagathis decorsei
- Euagathis dejongi
- Euagathis dravida
- Euagathis eburnea
- Euagathis ecostata
- Euagathis elevata
- Euagathis ephippium
- Euagathis flava
- Euagathis flavicornis
- Euagathis flavida
- Euagathis flavominuta
- Euagathis flavosoma
- Euagathis forticarinata
- Euagathis fortipes
- Euagathis fulvipennis
- Euagathis fuscinervis
- Euagathis fuscinotum
- Euagathis fuscipennis
- Euagathis fuscistigma
- Euagathis gracilitarsis
- Euagathis guangxiensis
- Euagathis hemixanthoptera
- Euagathis henseni
- Euagathis indica
- Euagathis interdicta
- Euagathis intermedia
- Euagathis japonica
- Euagathis javana
- Euagathis kapili
- Euagathis kendariensis
- Euagathis khasiana
- Euagathis leptoptera
- Euagathis levis
- Euagathis longicollis
- Euagathis lorensis
- Euagathis maculata
- Euagathis maculipennis
- Euagathis maculipennoides
- Euagathis magnifica
- Euagathis malayensis
- Euagathis maxichora
- Euagathis mayunae
- Euagathis mellifacies
- Euagathis mellisoma
- Euagathis minuta
- Euagathis minutoides
- Euagathis nigriceps
- Euagathis nigris
- Euagathis nigrisoma
- Euagathis novabritanica
- Euagathis novaguineensis
- Euagathis ophippium
- Euagathis pallidipes
- Euagathis pallitarsis
- Euagathis parallela
- Euagathis paraminuta
- Euagathis philippinensis
- Euagathis polita
- Euagathis pubescens
- Euagathis pulcha
- Euagathis punctata
- Euagathis raymondi
- Euagathis robusta
- Euagathis rotunda
- Euagathis ruficollis
- Euagathis rufithorax
- Euagathis rufonigra
- Euagathis rufoscapa
- Euagathis scutellata
- Euagathis semifusca
- Euagathis seminovi
- Euagathis semperi
- Euagathis sentosa
- Euagathis serena
- Euagathis setosimaculata
- Euagathis similis
- Euagathis subpilosa
- Euagathis suturalis
- Euagathis tambora
- Euagathis tobiasi
- Euagathis toxopeusi
- Euagathis transitor
- Euagathis vechti
- Euagathis vermiculata
