= Cremnops wileycoyotius =

Scientific classification
- Kingdom: Animalia
- Phylum: Arthropoda
- Clade: Pancrustacea
- Class: Insecta
- Order: Hymenoptera
- Family: Braconidae
- Genus: Cremnops
- Species: C. wileycoyotius

Binomial name
- Cremnops wileycoyotius Tucker, Chapman & Sharkey, 2015

Genus of wasps

Cremnops wileycoyotius is a species of parasitoid wasp belonging to the family Braconidae. It was first described and formally classified in 2015 by entomologists Erika M. Tucker, Eric G. Chapman, and Michael J. Sharkey.

== Etymology ==
The specific epithet wileycoyotius serves a dual purpose. It honors J. Wiley, who originally collected the holotype specimen in 1975 for the Florida State Collection of Arthropods. Additionally, the authors used his surname to create a pun referencing the Warner Bros. Looney Tunes character Wile E. Coyote. The authors humorously noted that, much like the cartoon character, the species had managed to remain "crafty" and avoid formal description for forty years.

== Distribution ==
The species is native to North America. The holotype and known specimens were collected in Florida, United States.
