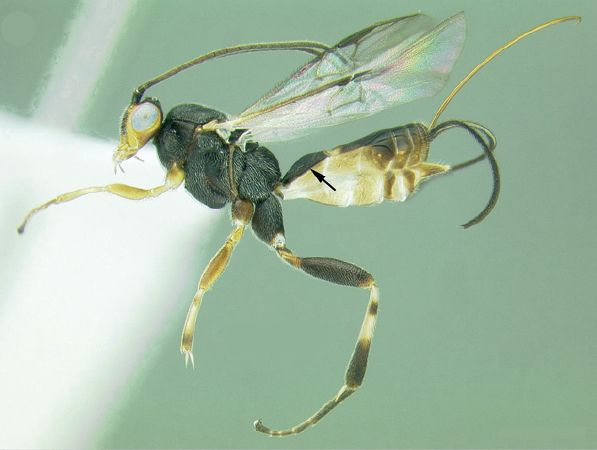
- Image of Camptothlipsis specimen

Scientific classification
- Kingdom: Animalia
- Phylum: Arthropoda
- Class: Insecta
- Order: Hymenoptera
- Family: Braconidae
- Subfamily: Agathidinae
- Tribe: Agathidini
- Genus: Camptothlipsis; Enderlein, 1920

= Camptothlipsis =

Genus of parasitic wasp

Camptothlipsis is a genus of insects belonging to the family Braconidae.

== Species ==
- Camptothlipsis aagota
- Camptothlipsis albinpennis
- Camptothlipsis annemariae
- Camptothlipsis arabica
- Camptothlipsis armeniaca
- Camptothlipsis breviantennalis
- Camptothlipsis curticornis
- Camptothlipsis fuscistigmalis
- Camptothlipsis hanoiensis
- Camptothlipsis inertusursus
- Camptothlipsis lingualongis
- Camptothlipsis luteostigmalis
- Camptothlipsis ruficornis
- Camptothlipsis rufithorax
- Camptothlipsis sheilae
- Camptothlipsis stenoradialis
- Camptothlipsis sublevis
