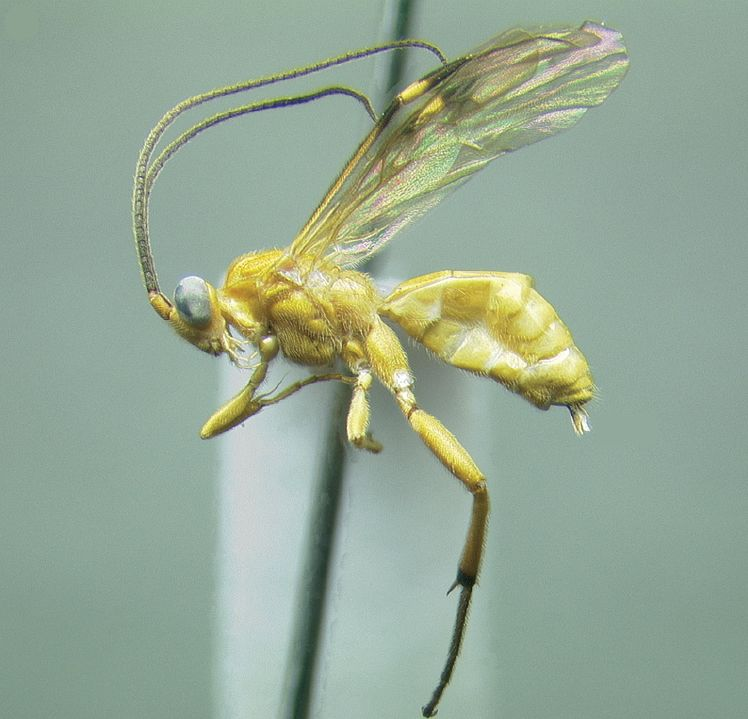
- Coccygidium specimen

Scientific classification
- Kingdom: Animalia
- Phylum: Arthropoda
- Class: Insecta
- Order: Hymenoptera
- Family: Braconidae
- Subfamily: Agathidinae
- Tribe: Disophrini
- Genus: Coccygidium; Saussure, 1892

= Coccygidium =

Genus of parasitic wasp

Coccygidium is a genus of parasitoid wasp in the family Braconidae.

== Species ==
- Coccygidium absolutum Chen & Yang, 1998
- Coccygidium amplarga Gupta & Bhat, 1972
- Coccygidium anator Fabricius, 1804
- Coccygidium angostura Bhhat & Gupta, 1977
- Coccygidium arabicum Ghramh, 2011
- Coccygidium areolare Szépligeti, 1908
- Coccygidium brasiliense Szépligeti, 1908
- Coccygidium concolor Szépligeti, 1908
- Coccygidium demerarus Enderlein, 1920
- Coccygidium divisum Enderlein, 1920
- Coccygidium dravida Bhat & Gupta 1977
- Coccygidium dubiosum Szépligeti, 1908
- Coccygidium erythrocephalum Cameron, 1905
- Coccygidium evanescens Enderlein, 1920
- Coccygidium exile Enderlein, 1920
- Coccygidium fuscipenne Szépligeti, 1902
- Coccygidium gregarium Sarmiento & Sharkey 2004
- Coccygidium hebabi Ghramh, 2013
- Coccygidium hospitator Febricius, 1775
- Coccygidium intermedium Szépligeti, 1908
- Coccygidium iridipenne Cameron, 1904
- Coccygidium luteum Brullé, 1846
- Coccygidium maculatum van Achterberg, 2011
- Coccygidium malayensis Bhat & Gupta, 1977
- Coccygidium mastigion Sharkey, 2011
- Coccygidium melanotum Viereck, 1912
- Coccygidium melleum Roman, 1910
- Coccygidium nigriceps Cameron, 1905
- Coccygidium nigricorne Cameron, 1904
- Coccygidium nigricrum Sharkey, 1998
- Coccygidium nigrum Sharkey, 1998
- Coccygidium nihonense Sharkey, 1996
- Coccygidium opacum Shestakov, 1928
- Coccygidium ornator Fabricius, 1787
- Coccygidium pallidum Kriechbaumer, 1894
- Coccygidium pellator Thunberg, 1822
- Coccygidium pennator Fabricius, 1804
- Coccygidium peruensis Szépligeti, 1902
- Coccygidium phaeoscapos Sharkey, 2011
- Coccygidium rugiferum van Achterberg, 2011
- Coccygidium ruidum Sharkey, 1996
- Coccygidium sissoo Wilkinson, 1929
- Coccygidium snyderi Ashmead, 1900
- Coccygidium speciosissimum Granger, 1949
- Coccygidium sudanense Gahan, 1915
- Coccygidium surinamense Szépligeti, 1908
- Coccygidium tarsale Szépligeti, 1902
- Coccygidium triste Granger, 1949
- Coccygidium transcaspicum Kokujev, 1902
- Coccygidium varipes Sharkey, 1996
