= Aerophilus =

Scientific classification
- Kingdom: Animalia
- Phylum: Arthropoda
- Class: Insecta
- Order: Hymenoptera
- Family: Braconidae
- Subfamily: Agathidinae
- Tribe: Agathidini
- Genus: Aerophilus; Szepligeti, 1902

Species
- Many, see text

Genus of wasps

Aerophilus is a genus of parasitoid wasps belonging to the family Braconidae. As members of the subfamily Agathidinae, they are koinobiont endoparasitoids of caterpillars. The host is attacked as an early instar, but not consumed and killed until the host is about to pupate. Nearly all species of Aerophilus have a narrow host range, attacking only one caterpillar species. However, the host range of the genus as a whole is quite broad, including many families of Lepidoptera.

Several species have been used in biological control programs, but with minimal success. Aerophilus has a world-wide distribution. Thirty-five species have been described from the United States and Canada.

== Species ==
- Aerophilus abdominalis
- Aerophilus aciculatus
- Aerophilus acrobasidis
- Aerophilus areolatus
- Aerophilus astioles
- Aerophilus arthurevansi
- Aerophilus bakeri
- Aerophilus barbieri
- Aerophilus bicarinatum
- Aerophilus bicristata
- Aerophilus binominatus
- Aerophilus boliviensis
- Aerophilus bradzlotnicki
- Aerophilus brasiliense
- Aerophilus brevitarsus
- Aerophilus brullei
- Aerophilus buttricki
- Aerophilus calcaratus
- Aerophilus chapmani
- Aerophilus colleenhitchcockae
- Aerophilus crassicornis
- Aerophilus davidsmithi
- Aerophilus davidwagneri
- Aerophilus difficillis
- Aerophilus ebulus
- Aerophilus erythrogaster
- Aerophilus facetus
- Aerophilus femoratus
- Aerophilus flavicalcar
- Aerophilus fortipes
- Aerophilus fundacionbandorum
- Aerophilus gregburtoni
- Aerophilus hopkinsensis
- Aerophilus infumatus
- Aerophilus jdherndoni
- Aerophilus jessicadimauroae
- Aerophilus jessiehillae
- Aerophilus klastos
- Aerophilus kowlesae
- Aerophilus lamelliger
- Aerophilus leucotretae
- Aerophilus lucidus
- Aerophilus macadamiae
- Aerophilus malus
- Aerophilus melanocephalus
- Aerophilus melleus
- Aerophilus mingfangi
- Aerophilus minys
- Aerophilus nicklaphani
- Aerophilus niger
- Aerophilus nigripes
- Aerophilus nigrobalteatus
- Aerophilus ninanae
- Aerophilus nucicola
- Aerophilus pastranai
- Aerophilus paulmarshi
- Aerophilus perforator
- Aerophilus persicus
- Aerophilus philippinensis
- Aerophilus pilosus
- Aerophilus pookae
- Aerophilus rayfisheri
- Aerophilus rebeccashapleyae
- Aerophilus reginae
- Aerophilus reticulatus
- Aerophilus robertcourtneyi
- Aerophilus robpringlei
- Aerophilus romani
- Aerophilus rufipes
- Aerophilus rufus
- Aerophilus rugulosus
- Aerophilus sandraberriosae
- Aerophilus scuptilis
- Aerophilus speciosicornis
- Aerophilus spinulatus
- Aerophilus stoelbae
- Aerophilus sulcatus
- Aerophilus tayrona
- Aerophilus tenuiceps
- Aerophilus terrymoyeri
- Aerophilus tommurrayi
- Aerophilus usitatus
- Aerophilus vaughntani
- Aerophilus wyomingensis
