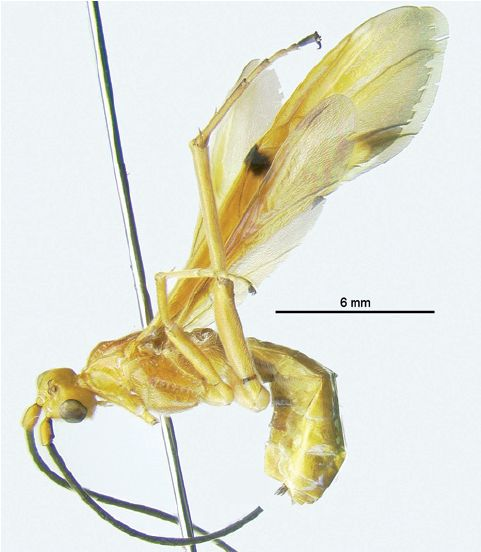
- Troticus specimen

Scientific classification
- Kingdom: Animalia
- Phylum: Arthropoda
- Class: Insecta
- Order: Hymenoptera
- Family: Braconidae
- Subfamily: Agathidinae
- Tribe: Disophrini
- Genus: Troticus; Brullé, 1846

= Troticus =

Genus of wasps

Troticus is a genus of parasitoid wasps in the family Braconidae.

== Species ==
- Troticus alloflavus
- Troticus alluaudi
- Troticus bredoi
- Troticus cryptus
- Troticus dewittei
- Troticus fasciatus
- Troticus fortipes
- Troticus flaviscapus
- Troticus giganteus
- Troticus latiabdominalis
- Troticus louwpenrithi
- Troticus mitra
- Troticus ocularis
- Troticus ovalis (host: Streblote repanda aegyptiaca)
- Troticus ovatus
- Troticus partitus
- Troticus segetophilus
- Troticus sharkeyi
- Troticus spatulatus
- Troticus tricortus
