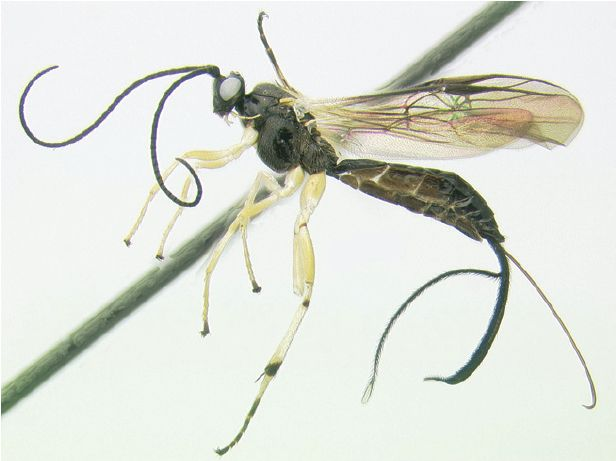

Scientific classification
- Kingdom: Animalia
- Phylum: Arthropoda
- Class: Insecta
- Order: Hymenoptera
- Family: Braconidae
- Genus: Earinus; Wesmael, 1837

= Earinus =

Genus of wasps

Earinus is a genus of parasitoid wasps belonging to the family Braconidae.

The species of this genus are found in Europe, America, and the Middle East.

== Species ==
- Earinus aurantius Achterberg & Long, 2010
- Earinus austinbakeri Sharkey, 2022
- Earinus bicolor Chou & Sharkey, 1989
- Earinus bourguignoni
- Earinus brevistigmus
- Earinus burmensis
- Earinus chubuquensis
- Earinus elator (Fabricius, 1804)
- Earinus erythropoda
- Earnius gloriatorius Pazner, 1809
- Earinus hubrechtae
- Earinus jezoensis
- Earinus limitaris
- Earinus longensis
- Earinus scitus
- Earinus transversus
- Earinus walleyi Sharkey, 2022
- Earinus wuyiensis
- Earinus zeirapherae
