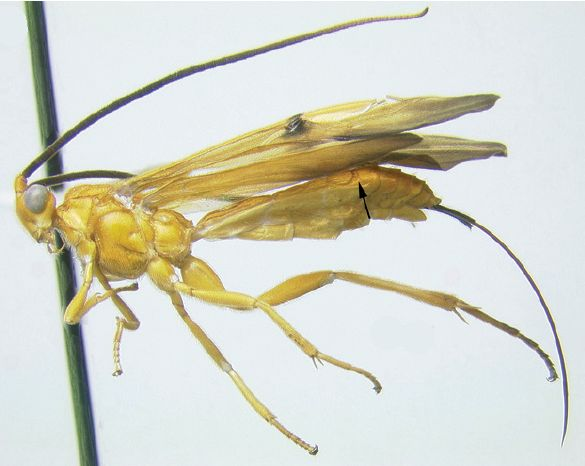

Scientific classification
- Kingdom: Animalia
- Phylum: Arthropoda
- Class: Insecta
- Order: Hymenoptera
- Family: Braconidae
- Subfamily: Agathidinae
- Tribe: Agathidini
- Genus: Braunsia; Kriechbaumer, 1894

= Braunsia (wasp) =

Genus of wasps

Braunsia is a genus of insects belonging to the family Braconidae.

The species of this genus are found in Europe, Far East, Africa and Australia.

It contains 70 species:

- Braunsia analis Kriechbaumer, 1894
- Braunsia angulosa Bhat & Gupta, 1977
- Braunsia bicolorata van Achterberg & Long, 2010
- Braunsia devriesivan Achterberg & Long, 2010
- Braunsia fumipennis (Cameron, 1899)
- Braunsia guangdongensis Tang, van Achterberg & Chen, 2017
- Braunsia maculiferavan Achterberg & Long, 2010
- Braunsia nigrapiculatavan Achterberg & Long, 2010
- Braunsia pilosa Belokobylskij, 1986
- Braunsia postfurcalis Watanabe, 1937
- Braunsia shenyangensis Tang, van Achterberg & Chen, 2017
- Braunsia smithii (Dalla Torre, 1898)
- Braunsia pumaticavan Achterberg & Long, 2010
