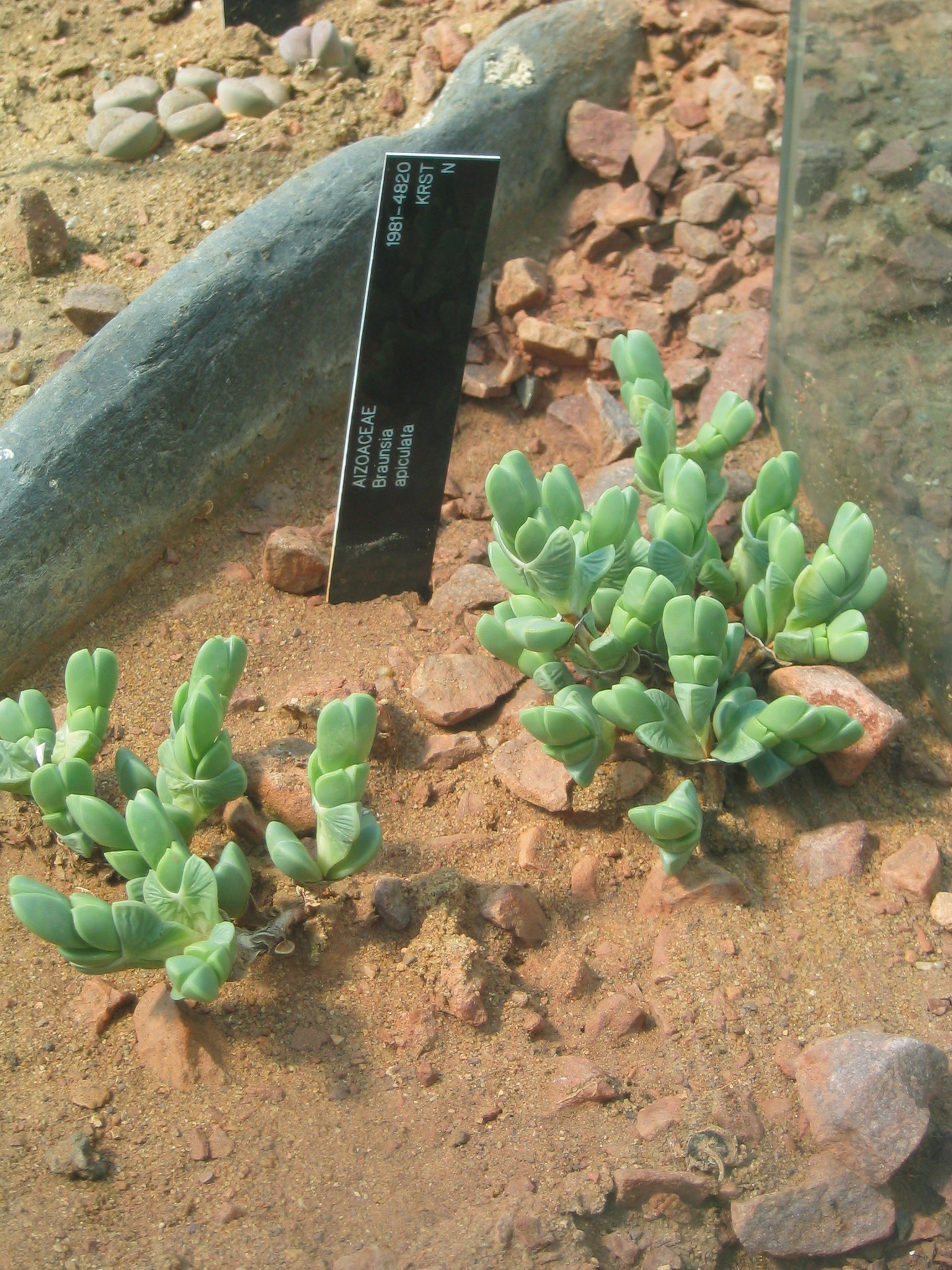
- Braunsia apiculata

Scientific classification
- Kingdom: Plantae
- Clade: Tracheophytes
- Clade: Angiosperms
- Clade: Eudicots
- Order: Caryophyllales
- Family: Aizoaceae
- Subfamily: Ruschioideae
- Tribe: Ruschieae
- Genus: Braunsia; Schwantes

Species
- 7; see text

Synonyms
- Echinus L.Bolus

= Braunsia (plant) =

Genus of succulents

Braunsia is a genus of succulent plants in the family Aizoaceae, indigenous to the Western Cape province in South Africa.

The plant only grows to 20 cm (8 inches), its opposite leaves grow in pairs, its flowers are either pink or magenta. The plant grows slowly so it only needs water in late fall to early spring. In other seasons its preferable for it to be kept dry.

== Species ==
Seven species are accepted.

- Braunsia apiculata (Kensit) L.Bolus
- Braunsia bina (N.E.Br.) Schwantes
- Braunsia geminata (Haw.) L.Bolus
- Braunsia maximilianii (Schltr. & A.Berger) Schwantes
- Braunsia nelii Schwantes
- Braunsia stayneri (L.Bolus) L.Bolus
- Braunsia vanrensburgii (L.Bolus) L.Bolus
