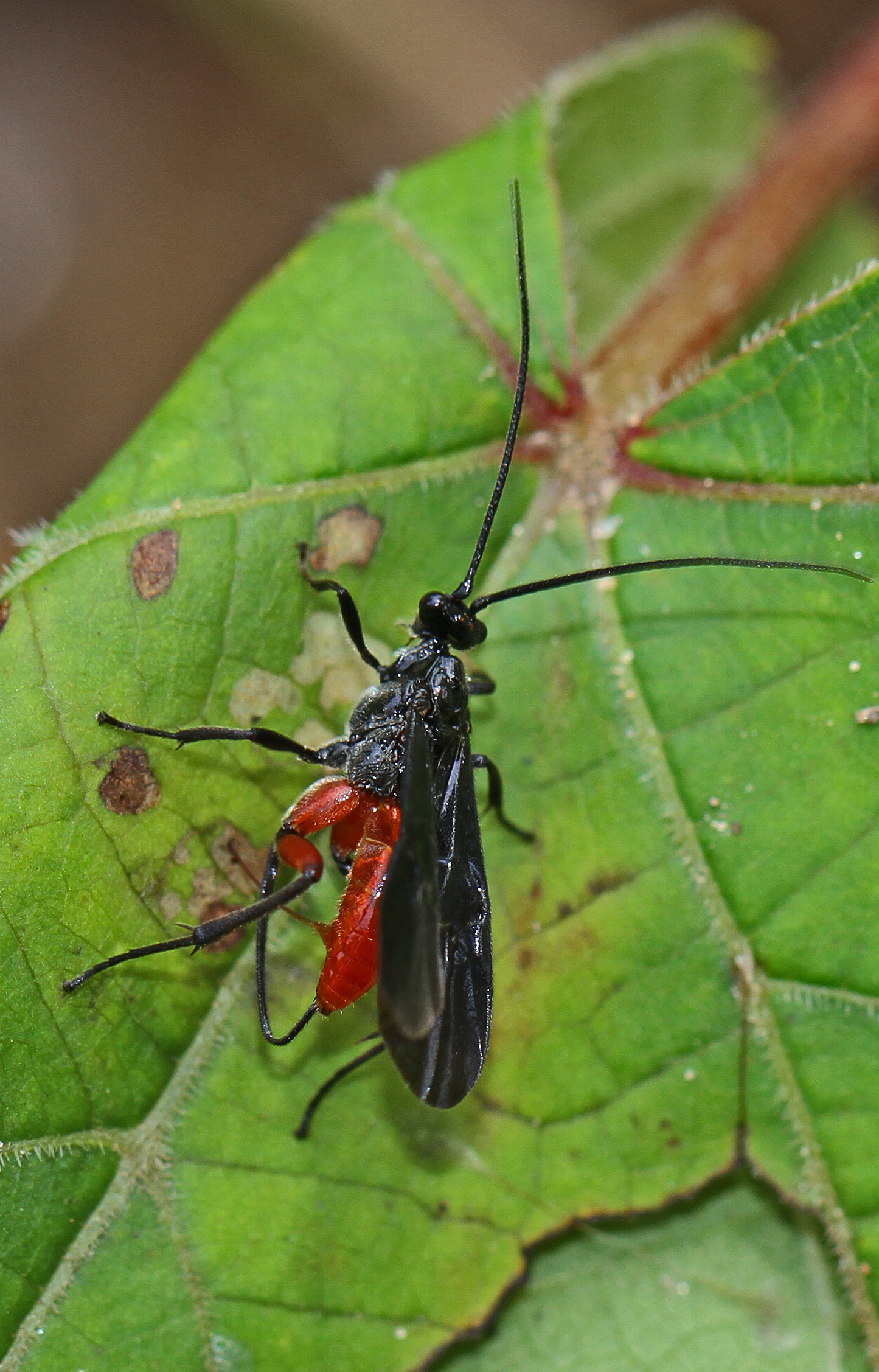
- Alabagrus texanus

Scientific classification
- Kingdom: Animalia
- Phylum: Arthropoda
- Clade: Pancrustacea
- Class: Insecta
- Order: Hymenoptera
- Family: Braconidae
- Subfamily: Agathidinae
- Tribe: Agathidini
- Genus: Alabagrus; Enderlein, 1920

= Alabagrus =

Genus of wasps

Alabagrus is a genus of wasps in the family Braconidae. There are at least 100 described species in Alabagrus.

== See also ==
- List of Alabagrus species
