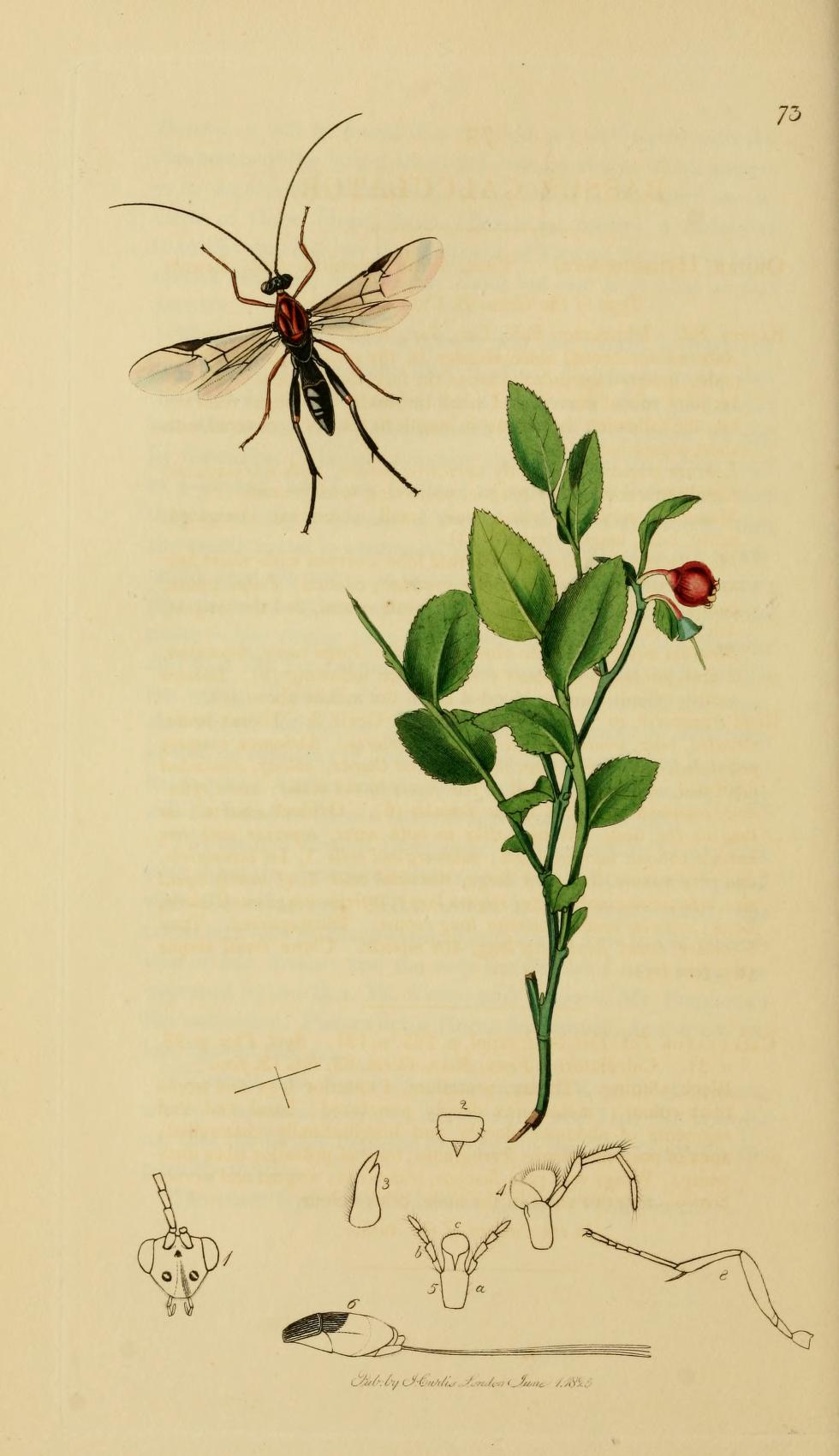
- An illustration from British Entomology by John Curtis

Scientific classification
- Kingdom: Animalia
- Phylum: Arthropoda
- Class: Insecta
- Order: Hymenoptera
- Family: Braconidae
- Subfamily: Agathidinae
- Tribe: Agathidini
- Genus: Bassus; Fabricius, 1804

= Bassus (wasp) =

Genus of wasps

Bassus is a genus of insects belonging to the family Braconidae.

The genus has almost cosmopolitan distribution.

== Species ==
- Bassus abdominalis Muesebeck, 1927
- Bassus aciculatus (Ashmead, 1889)
- Bassus acrobasidis
- Bassus agathoides
- Bassus agilis
- Bassus albifasciatus
- Bassus albipennis
- Bassus albozonatus
- Bassus annulipes
- Bassus annulus
- Bassus antefurcalis
- Bassus antigastrae
- Bassus arcuatus
- Bassus armenicus
- Bassus arthurellus
- Bassus asper
- Bassus atripes
- Bassus azygos
- Bassus babiyi
- Bassus bakeri
- Bassus barbieri
- Bassus belokobylskiji
- Bassus beyarslani Çetin Erdoğan, 2005
- Bassus bicristatus
- Bassus binominatus
- Bassus bishopi
- Bassus boliviensis
- Bassus brevicauda
- Bassus brevicaudis
- Bassus brooksi
- Bassus bruesi
- Bassus brullei
- Bassus buttricki
- Bassus calcaratus
- Bassus calculator Fabricius, 1789
- Bassus californicus
- Bassus canariensis
- Bassus cancellatus
- Bassus chibcha
- Bassus cinctus
- Bassus cingulipes
- Bassus clausiellus
- Bassus clausthalianus
- Bassus coleophorae
- Bassus columbianus
- Bassus conspicuus
- Bassus coriarius
- Bassus cornutus
- Bassus costalis
- Bassus crassicornis
- Bassus cryptophlebiae
- Bassus cupressi
- Bassus curticornis
- Bassus depressus
- Bassus difficilis
- Bassus dimidiator
- Bassus discolor
- Bassus dravida
- Bassus epinotiae
- Bassus eriphyle
- Bassus erythrogaster
- Bassus facetus
- Bassus festinatus
- Bassus festivoides
- Bassus festivus
- Bassus filipalpis
- Bassus flavidus
- Bassus formosanus
- Bassus fortipes
- Bassus furtificus
- Bassus gossypiella
- Bassus gracilis
- Bassus graecus
- Bassus guangxiensis
- Bassus helvenacus
- Bassus immaculatus
- Bassus incompletus
- Bassus infumatus
- Bassus inopinatae
- Bassus javanus
- Bassus laevis
- Bassus lamelliger
- Bassus lanyuensis
- Bassus laticeps
- Bassus leucotretae
- Bassus lienhuachihensis
- Bassus lineaticollis
- Bassus linguarius
- Bassus levisulcus
- Bassus lini
- Bassus liogaster
- Bassus lucidus
- Bassus luzonicus
- Bassus macadamiae
- Bassus macrocentroides
- Bassus macronura
- Bassus malignus
- Bassus marshi
- Bassus mediator
- Bassus melleus
- Bassus meridionalis
- Bassus merkli
- Bassus mesoxantha
- Bassus minimus
- Bassus minor
- Bassus mongolicus
- Bassus muesebecki
- Bassus niger
- Bassus nigricoxus
- Bassus nigripes
- Bassus nigrisoma
- Bassus nigriventris
- Bassus ninanae
- Bassus nucicola
- Bassus nugax
- Bassus ochrosus
- Bassus parallelus
- Bassus pedunculatus
- Bassus peniculus
- Bassus perforator
- Bassus perula
- Bassus petiolatus
- Bassus philippinensis
- Bassus pilosus
- Bassus pini
- Bassus postfurcalis
- Bassus pulcher
- Bassus pumilus
- Bassus punctiventris
- Bassus quebecensis
- Bassus reductus
- Bassus relativus
- Bassus reticulatus
- Bassus robustus
- Bassus romani
- Bassus rudimentarius
- Bassus ruficeps
- Bassus ruficornis
- Bassus rufipes
- Bassus rufithorax
- Bassus rufus
- Bassus rugareolatus
- Bassus rugosus
- Bassus rugulosus
- Bassus sculptilis
- Bassus semiruber
- Bassus semistriatus
- Bassus seyrigi
- Bassus similis
- Bassus simillimus
- Bassus speciosicornis
- Bassus spinosus
- Bassus spinulatus
- Bassus spiracularis
- Bassus stenoradialis
- Bassus strigatus
- Bassus striogranulatus
- Bassus sublevis
- Bassus sulcatus
- Bassus sungkangensis
- Bassus szepligetii
- Bassus taichungensis
- Bassus tayrona
- Bassus tayulingensis
- Bassus tegularis
- Bassus tenuiceps
- Bassus tenuissimus
- Bassus tergalis Alexeev, 1971
- Bassus terminatus
- Bassus tobiasi
- Bassus transversus
- Bassus triangularis
- Bassus triangulus
- Bassus tricolor
- Bassus tsuifengensis
- Bassus tumidulus
- Bassus unimaculatus
- Bassus usitatus
- Bassus ussuriensis
- Bassus verticalis
- Bassus wufengensis
- Bassus zaykovi
