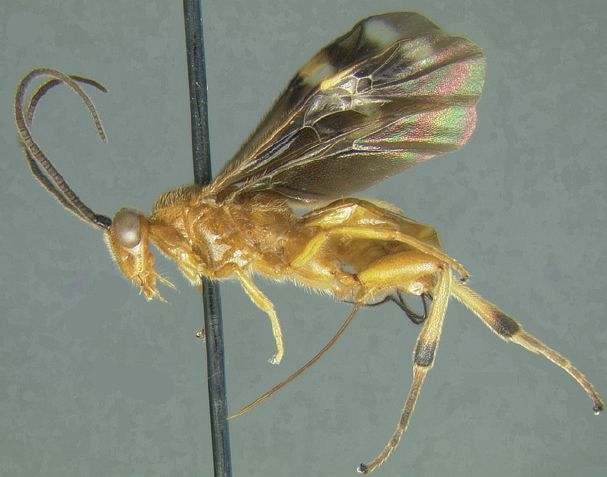

Scientific classification
- Domain: Eukaryota
- Kingdom: Animalia
- Phylum: Arthropoda
- Class: Insecta
- Order: Hymenoptera
- Family: Braconidae
- Genus: Cremnops; Förster, 1862

= Cremnops =

Genus of wasps

Cremnops is a genus of insects belonging to the family Braconidae.

The species of this genus are found in North America, Europe and Japan, and the Middle East.

== Species ==
- Cremnops apicalipennis Berta, 1998
- Cremnops ashmeadi Morrison, 1917
- Cremnops atripennis
- Cremnops bertae
- Cremnops bicolor
- Cremnops bispinosus
- Cremnops boliviensis Berta, 1988
- Cremnops borealis
- Cremnops borneanus
- Cremnops californicus Morrison, 1917
- Cremnops cameronii Dalla Torre, 1898
- Cremnops caribensis
- Cremnops cluttsis
- Cremnops collaris
- Cremnops commutator
- Cremnops comstocki Morrison, 1917
- Cremnops crassifemur Muesebeck, 1927
- Cremnops cubensis Cresson, 1865
- Cremnops desertor Linnaeus, 1758
- Cremnops dissimilis
- Cremnops elegantissimus
- Cremnops ferrugineus Cameron, 1887
- Cremnops florissanticola
- Cremnops frustalis
- Cremnops fulgidipennis
- Cremnops fuscipennis
- Cremnops guanicanus Wolcott, 1924
- Cremnops haematodes Brulle, 1846
- Cremnops hedini
- Cremnops indicus
- Cremnops insulcatus
- Cremnops kapilli
- Cremnops kelloggii Morrison, 1917
- Cremnops malayensis
- Cremnops marginipennis
- Cremnops marshi Berta, 1998
- Cremnops meabilis Cresson, 1872
- Cremnops mekongensis
- Cremnops melanopterus Ashmead, 1894
- Cremnops melanoptera
- Cremnops misionensis
- Cremnops monochroa
- Cremnops montrealensis Morrison, 1917
- Cremnops nigrosternum
- Cremnops nymphius Tucker, Chapman & Sharkey, 2015
- Cremnops obsolescens
- Cremnops papuanus
- Cremnops pectoralis Ashmead, 1894
- Cremnops philippinensis
- Cremnops plesiopectoralis Berta, 1998
- Cremnops posticeniger
- Cremnops pulchripennis
- Cremnops punctatus
- Cremnops richteri
- Cremnops rubrigaster
- Cremnops ruficeps
- Cremnops rufitarsis
- Cremnops salomonis
- Cremnops schubotzi
- Cremnops sculpturalis
- Cremnops sharkei
- Cremnops shenefelti Marsh, 1961
- Cremnops similis
- Cremnops slossonae Morrison, 1917
- Cremnops testaceus
- Cremnops tibiomaculatus Berta, 1998
- Cremnops turrialbae
- Cremnops variceps
- Cremnops varipilosella
- Cremnops violaceipennis Cameron, 1887
- Cremnops virginiensis Morrison, 1917
- Cremnops vulgaris Cresson, 1865
- Cremnops washingtonensis
- Cremnops willinki Berta, 1998
- Cremnops wileycoyotius
- Cremnops witkopegasus
- Cremnops xanthostigma
- Cremnops yucatanus Berta, 1998
- Cremnops zululandensis
