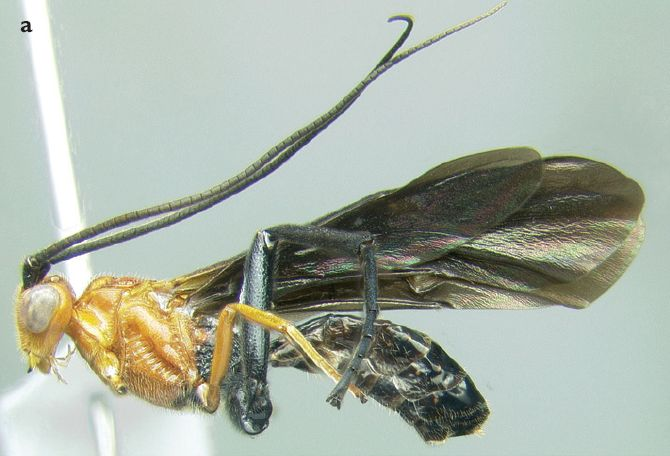
- Disophrys specimen

Scientific classification
- Kingdom: Animalia
- Phylum: Arthropoda
- Class: Insecta
- Order: Hymenoptera
- Family: Braconidae
- Subfamily: Agathidinae
- Tribe: Disophrini
- Genus: Disophrys; Förster, 1863

= Disophrys =

Genus of parasitoid wasp

Disophrys is a genus of parasitoid wasps in the family Braconidae.

== Species ==
- Disophrys albopilosella
- Disophrys angitemporalis
- Disophrys atripennis
- Disophrys atrocarpa
- Disophrys atrocephala
- Disophrys blandula
- Disophrys caesa
- Disophrys calabarica
- Disophrys calcaratrix
- Disophrys capensis
- Disophrys ceylonica
- Disophrys chinensis
- Disophrys coelaspis
- Disophrys conjungens
- Disophrys conspicua
- Disophrys cramptoni
- Disophrys cucullifera
- Disophrys dehraensis
- Disophrys dichroa
- Disophrys diluta
- Disophrys dissors
- Disophrys diversipes
- Disophrys elegans
- Disophrys erythrocephala
- Disophrys erythropa
- Disophrys evanescens
- Disophrys exilis
- Disophrys exornata
- Disophrys flaviceps
- Disophrys flavifemur
- Disophrys flavipes
- Disophrys fraudator
- Disophrys fumipennis
- Disophrys guineensis
- Disophrys hyalipennis
- Disophrys imperfecta
- Disophrys inculcatrix
- Disophrys indica
- Disophrys insidiator
- Disophrys insidiosa
- Disophrys insignis
- Disophrys intermedia
- Disophrys kandyensis
- Disophrys latiabdominalis
- Disophrys laticeps
- Disophrys lutea
- Disophrys madagascariensis
- Disophrys maculifera
- Disophrys major
- Disophrys melanogaster
- Disophrys mellea
- Disophrys minor
- Disophrys mitra
- Disophrys molukkensis
- Disophrys natalensis
- Disophrys nigra
- Disophrys nigriceps
- Disophrys nigricepsibol
- Disophrys nigricornis
- Disophrys nigrivertex
- Disophrys nigronotata
- Disophrys nigropectus
- Disophrys oculata
- Disophrys ophthalmica
- Disophrys ornatipennis
- Disophrys pedalis
- Disophrys philippensis
- Disophrys picturata
- Disophrys pilipes
- Disophrys pulchricornis
- Disophrys punctata
- Disophrys punctifera
- Disophrys quadrifossulata
- Disophrys quymanhi
- Disophrys rhinoides
- Disophrys ruberrima
- Disophrys rufa
- Disophrys rufifrons
- Disophrys rufoplagiata
- Disophrys scita
- Disophrys sculpturalis
- Disophrys seminigra
- Disophrys severini
- Disophrys signatipennis
- Disophrys similipicta
- Disophrys sissoo
- Disophrys sogdiana
- Disophrys speciosissima
- Disophrys striata
- Disophrys strigata
- Disophrys subfasciata
- Disophrys testacea
- Disophrys tinctipennis
- Disophrys tristis
- Disophrys variegata
- Disophrys variegatenda
- Disophrys xanthocephala
- Disophrys xanthostigma
