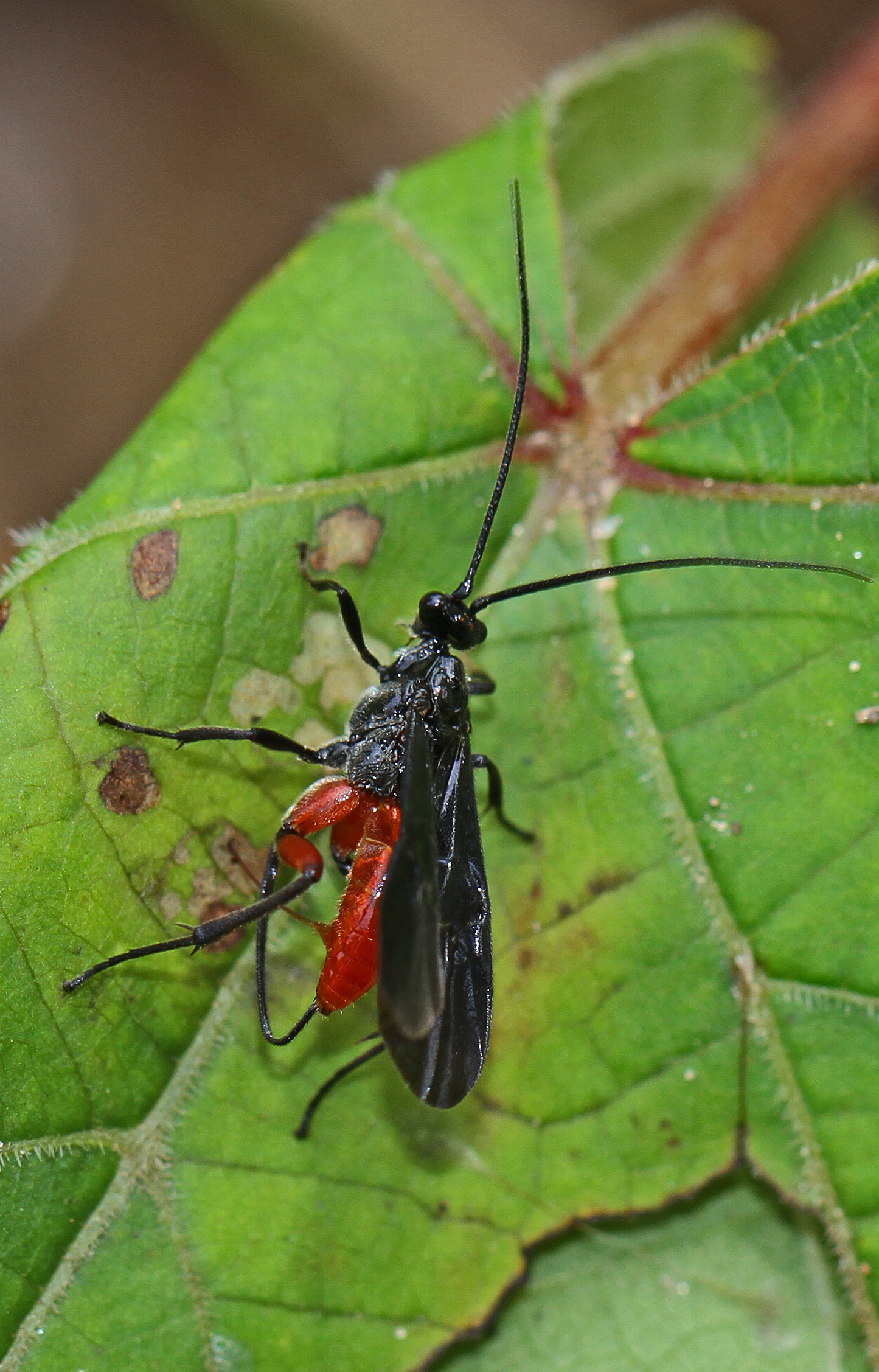

Scientific classification
- Kingdom: Animalia
- Phylum: Arthropoda
- Class: Insecta
- Order: Hymenoptera
- Family: Braconidae
- Genus: Alabagrus
- Species: A. texanus

Binomial name
- Alabagrus texanus (Cresson, 1872)

= Alabagrus texanus =

Species of wasp

Alabagrus texanus is a species of braconid wasp in the family Braconidae. It develops within the larvae of Herpetogramma theseusalis. Males emerge from pupation earlier than females. Females typically only mate once, whereas males mate more than once.

Studies have found that the males that arrive early to a site where females recently emerged from were often successful, but the very young and very old males were always unsuccessful. Males also had short-term memory regarding sites of female emergence.
