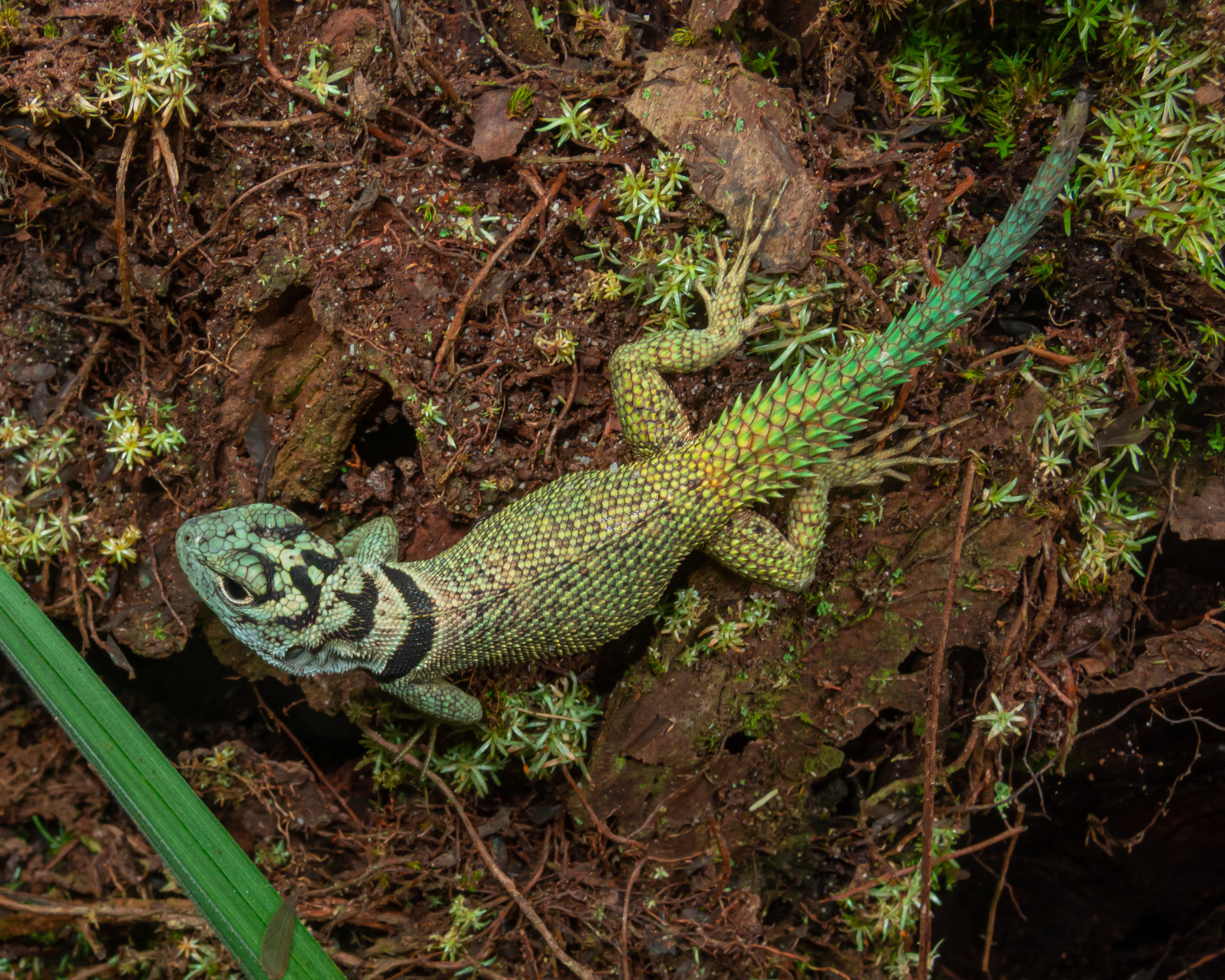

Conservation status
- Least Concern (IUCN 3.1)

Scientific classification
- Kingdom: Animalia
- Phylum: Chordata
- Class: Reptilia
- Order: Squamata
- Suborder: Iguania
- Family: Tropiduridae
- Genus: Strobilurus; Wiegmann, 1834
- Species: S. torquatus

Binomial name
- Strobilurus torquatus Wiegmann, 1834

Synonyms
- Doryphorus spinosus Guichenot 1855; Tropidurus strobilurus Frost 1992

= Strobilurus torquatus =

Species of lizard

Strobilurus torquatus is a species of lizard in the family Tropiduridae and the only member of the genus Strobilurus. This arboreal lizard is found in the Atlantic Forest in eastern Brazil, ranging from Rio de Janeiro to Ceará.
