= Agathis (wasp) =

Scientific classification
- Kingdom: Animalia
- Phylum: Arthropoda
- Class: Insecta
- Order: Hymenoptera
- Family: Braconidae
- Subfamily: Agathidinae
- Tribe: Agathidini
- Genus: Agathis; Latreille, 1804

Genus of wasps

Agathis is a genus of braconid parasitoid wasps. This genus was established by Latreille in 1804, and the type species is Agathis malvacearum Latreille, 1805. There are at least forty six species of Agathis in the western palearctic region.

== Selected species ==
- Agathis achterbergi
- Agathis aequoreticulata
- Agathis albitarsis
- Agathis albolineata
- Agathis alvarengai
- Agathis amboinensis
- Agathis amoena
- Agathis anceps
- Agathis anglica
- Agathis areolaris
- Agathis areolata
- Agathis arida
- Agathis assimilis
- Agathis asteris
- Agathis asternaula
- Agathis astioles
- Agathis berkei
- Agathis bischoffi
- Agathis brevigenis
- Agathis brevis
- Agathis breviseta
- Agathis budha
- Agathis burmensis
- Agathis calcarata
- Agathis cama
- Agathis capensis
- Agathis carinata
- Agathis championi
- Agathis citrinisoma
- Agathis confertipunctata
- Agathis conformis
- Agathis coryphe
- Agathis costata
- Agathis coxalicus
- Agathis coxalis
- Agathis curvabilis
- Agathis cylasovora
- Agathis cymocles
- Agathis debilis
- Agathis dichroptera
- Agathis discolorides
- Agathis distincta
- Agathis dravida
- Agathis duplicata
- Agathis dzulphensis
- Agathis erythrogastra
- Agathis erythrothorax
- Agathis extinctor
- Agathis fabiae
- Agathis femorata
- Agathis ferrugator
- Agathis ferulae
- Agathis fischeri
- Agathis ferulae
- Agathis fischeri
- Agathis flaccistriata
- Agathis flaccisulcata
- Agathis flava
- Agathis flavipennis
- Agathis fuscipennis
- Agathis genalis
- Agathis gibbosa
- Agathis glaucoptera
- Agathis glycinivorellae
- Agathis glyphodis
- Agathis gracilenta
- Agathis gracilipes
- Agathis gracilis
- Agathis griseifrons
- Agathis guyanensis
- Agathis hawaiicola
- Agathis haywardi
- Agathis hemirufa
- Agathis hyalinis
- Agathis icarus
- Agathis icarus
- Agathis indica
- Agathis inedia
- Agathis insularica
- Agathis jordanicola
- Agathis juvenilis
- Agathis kerzhneri
- Agathis kozlovi
- Agathis kumatai
- Agathis laevis
- Agathis laevithorax
- Agathis latibalteata
- Agathis latisulcata
- Agathis leucogaster
- Agathis levis
- Agathis longiabdominalis
- Agathis longipalpa
- Agathis lugubris
- Agathis luteotegula
- Agathis luzonica
- Agathis maetoi
- Agathis malayensis
- Agathis malvacearum Latreille, 1805 (parasitoid of the burdock seedhead moth)
- Agathis mandarina
- Agathis martialis
- Agathis masoni
- Agathis matangensis
- Agathis mediator
- Agathis medinai
- Agathis melanocephala
- Agathis melanopleura
- Agathis melanotegula
- Agathis melpomene
- Agathis miocenica
- Agathis mongolica
- Agathis mongolorum
- Agathis montana
- Agathis montivaga
- Agathis nachitshevanica
- Agathis nachitshevanica
- Agathis nasicornis
- Agathis nepalensis
- Agathis nigra
- Agathis nigrobalteata
- Agathis orchestidis
- Agathis ornaticeps
- Agathis ornaticornis
- Agathis pappei
- Agathis pastranai
- Agathis pedias
- Agathis peronata
- Agathis persephone
- Agathis philippinensis
- Agathis polita
- Agathis pubescens
- Agathis pumila
- Agathis punctatosulcata
- Agathis punctatovertex
- Agathis purgator
- Agathis pygmaea
- Agathis quadrangularis
- Agathis rostrata
- Agathis rubens
- Agathis rubricata
- Agathis rubripes
- Agathis rubriventris
- Agathis rufipalpis
- Agathis rufithorax
- Agathis rufobrunnea
- Agathis sabahensis
- Agathis saxatilis
- Agathis sculpturata
- Agathis semiaciculata
- Agathis syngenesiae
- Agathis seminigra
- Agathis shiva
- Agathis sibiricana
- Agathis smithii
- Agathis syngenesiae
- Agathis taeniativentris
- Agathis tatarica
- Agathis taurica
- Agathis tautirae
- Agathis thompsoni
- Agathis tibialis
- Agathis tibiator
- Agathis townesi
- Agathis trailii
- Agathis transcaucasica
- Agathis transtriata
- Agathis trifasciata
- Agathis turanica
- Agathis umbellatarum
- Agathis unicincta
- Agathis unicolor
- Agathis variegata
- Agathis varipes
- Agathis velata
- Agathis verae
- Agathis virendrai
- Agathis watanabei
- Agathis xanthopsis
- Agathis yui
- Agathis zaisanica
